= May Qoqah =

River in the Tembien highlands of Ethiopia

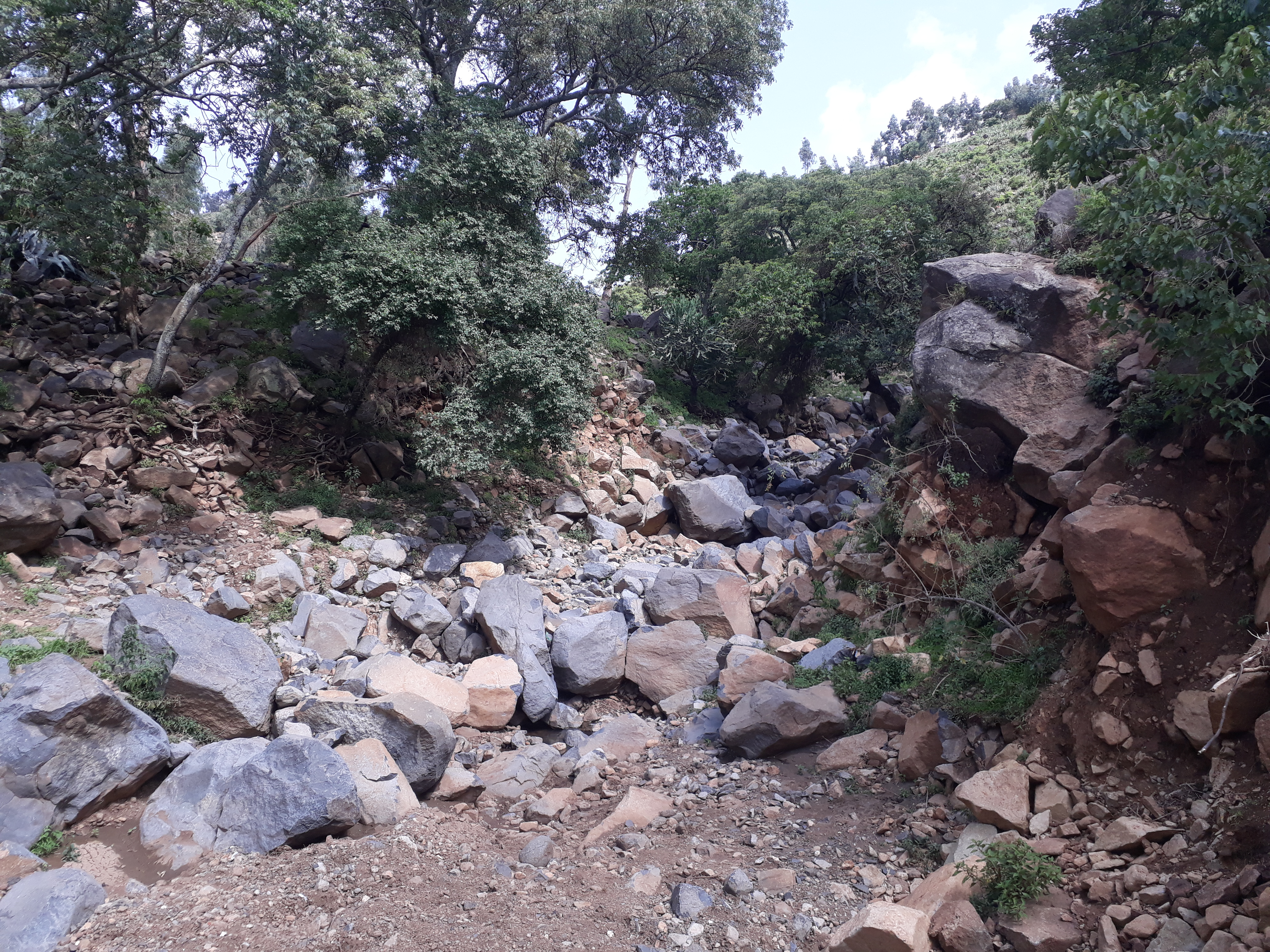
- The May Qoqah River at Hamute

- May Qoqah River in Dogu’a Tembien

Location
- Country: Ethiopia
- Region: Tigray Region
- District (woreda): Dogu’a Tembien

Physical characteristics
- Source: Ts’ats’en plateau
  - location: Agerbi’a in Lim'at municipality
  - elevation: 2,640 m (8,660 ft)
- Mouth: Zelekwa or upper Tanqwa River
  - location: Hamute in Lim'at municipality
  - coordinates: 13.63°N 39.137°E
  - elevation: 2,370 m (7,780 ft)
- Length: 3 km (1.9 mi)
- Width
  - average: 8 m (26 ft)

Basin features
- Progression: Tanqwa→ Giba→ Tekezé→ Atbarah→ Nile→ Mediterranean Sea
- River system: Permanent river
- Landmarks: Basalt cliffs with eucalypts
- Waterbodies: Ketin Kalay bedrock basins
- Waterfalls: Rapids
- Bridges: On main road Mek'ele-Abiy Addi
- Topography: Mountains and gorges

The May Qoqah is a river of the Nile basin. Rising on the Ts’ats’en plateau of Dogu’a Tembien in northern Ethiopia, it flows northward to empty finally in the Giba and Tekezé River.

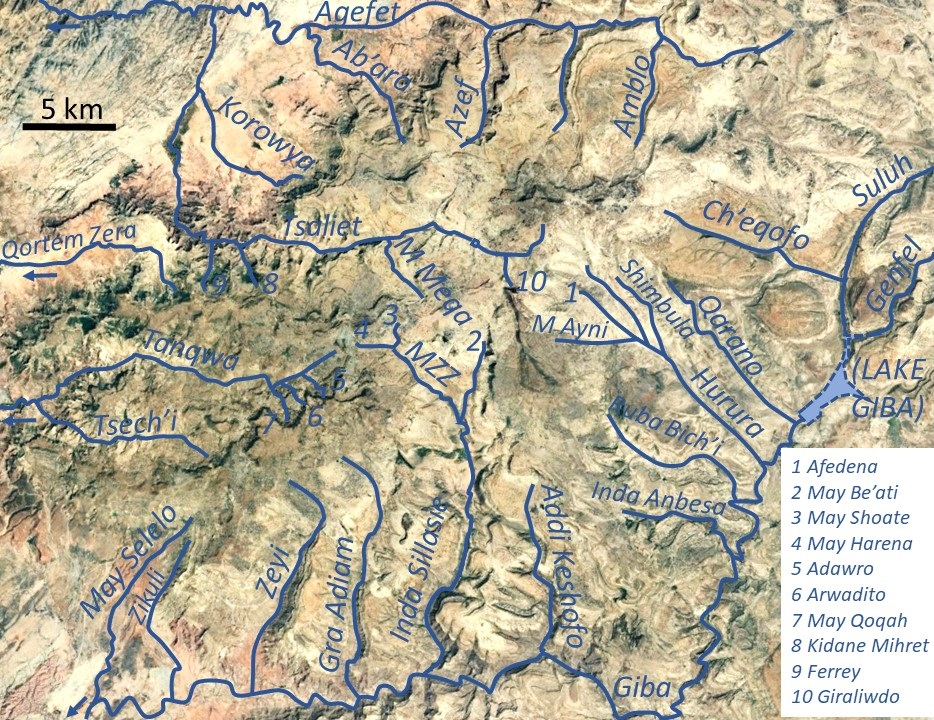
The river in the radial drainage network of Dogu’a Tembien

== Characteristics ==
It is a confined bedrock river, with an average slope gradient of 90 metres per kilometre. The river has cut a gorge in the surrounding basalt.

== Flash floods and flood buffering ==
Runoff mostly happens in the form of high runoff discharge events that occur in a very short period (called flash floods). These are related to the steep topography, often little vegetation cover and intense convective rainfall. The peaks of such flash floods have often a 50 to 100 times larger discharge than the preceding baseflow. The magnitude of floods in this river has however been decreased due to interventions in the catchment. Physical conservation structures such as stone bunds and check dams also intercept runoff.

Observing that, in rivers with coarse bedload, gabion check dams were destroyed by abrasion, boulder-faced log dams were installed transversally across this torrent. They were embedded in the banks of torrent, 0.5–1 m above the bed, and their upstream sides were faced with large rocks. Such dams lead to temporary water ponding, spreading of peak flow over the entire channel width, and sediment deposition. After testing under extreme flow conditions (including two heavy storms) it appeared that 60% of the dams resisted strong floods, particularly in the upper segment of the river. Neighbouring farmers appreciate such structures to control first-order torrents with coarse bed load because the technique is cheap and can be easily installed.

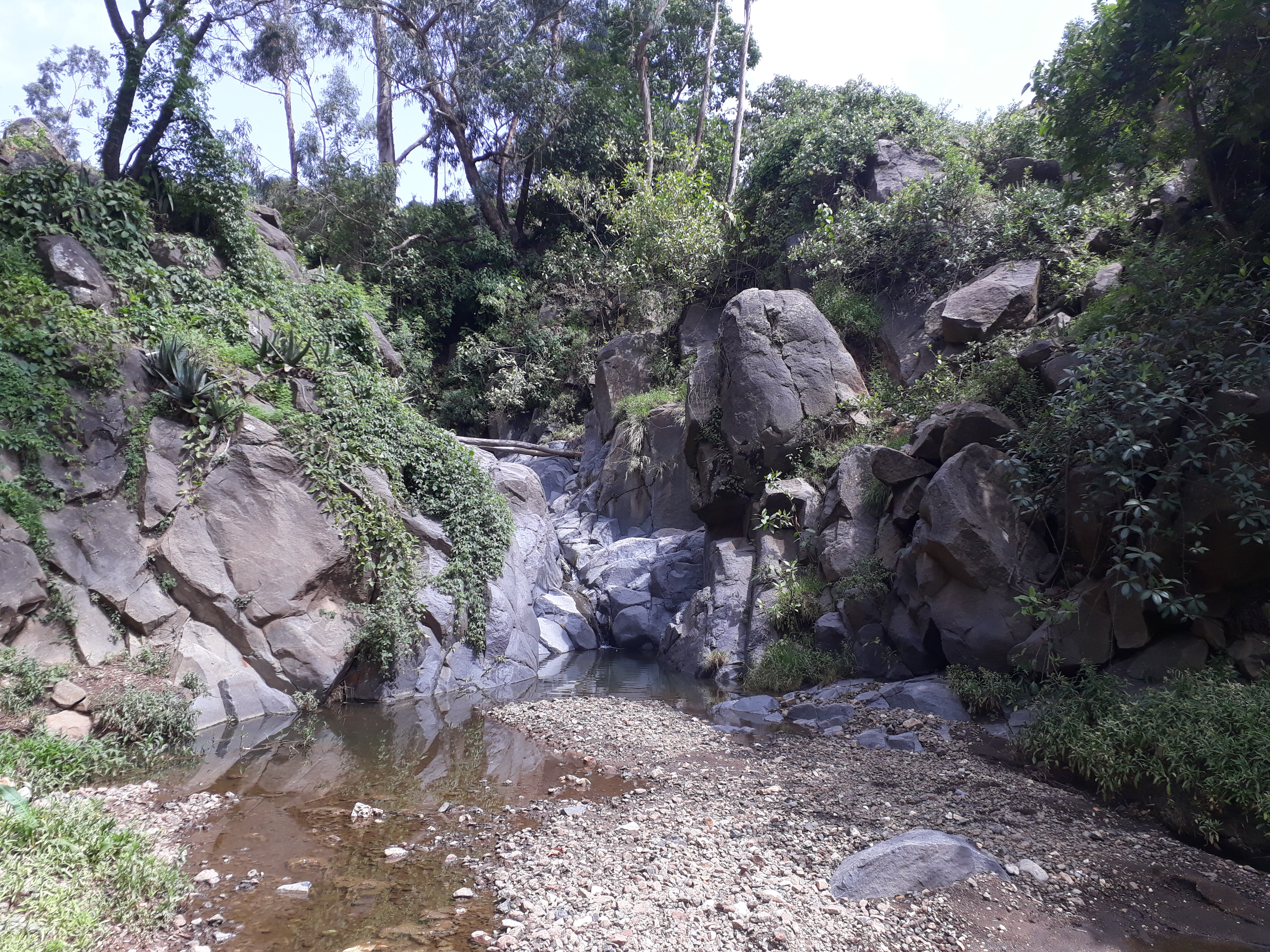
Ketin Kalay, permanent ponds in the May Qoqah stream bed

== Irrigated agriculture in Hamute ==
Besides springs and reservoirs, irrigation is strongly dependent on the river's baseflow. Such irrigated agriculture is important in meeting the demands for food security and poverty reduction. Irrigated lands are established at the outlet of the gorge in Hamute.

== Boulders and pebbles in the river bed ==
Boulders and pebbles encountered in the river bed can originate from any location higher up in the catchment. In the uppermost stretches of the river, only rock fragments of the upper lithological units will be present in the river bed, whereas more downstream one may find a more comprehensive mix of all lithologies crossed by the river. From upstream to downstream, the following lithological units occur in the catchment.

- Upper basalt
- Interbedded lacustrine deposits
- Lower basalt
- Amba Aradam Formation

== Trekking along the river ==
Trekking routes have been established across and along this river. The tracks are not marked on the ground but can be followed using downloaded .GPX files. Trek 7 partly follows the river and allows visiting the log dams.

== See also ==
- List of Ethiopian rivers
