= Tanqwa =

River in the Tigray highlands of Ethiopia

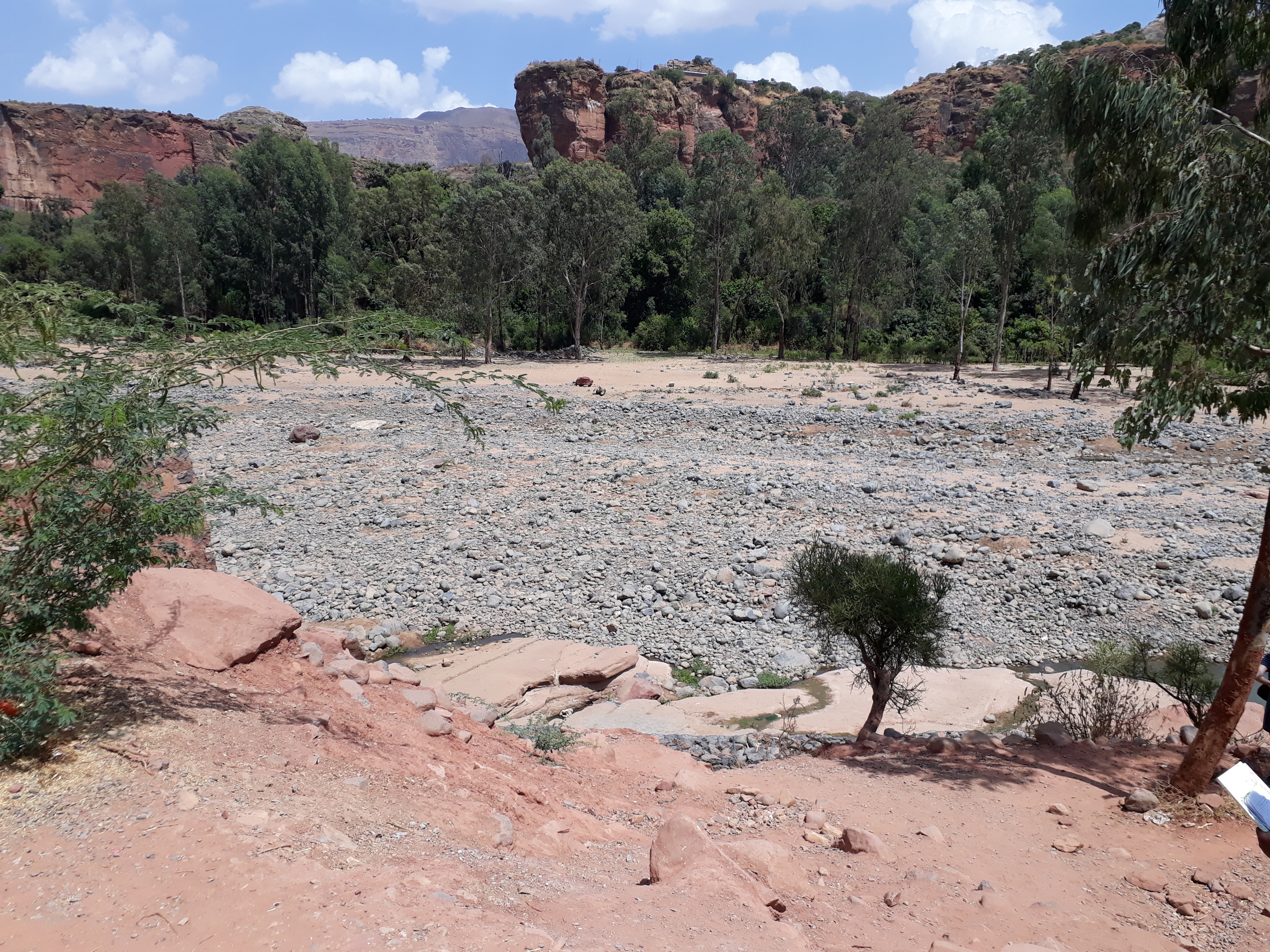
- The Tanqwa River near Abiy Addi

- Tanqwa River in Tigray Region

Location
- Country: Ethiopia
- Region: Tigray Region
- Districts (woreda): Dogu’a Tembien, Kola Tembien, Abergele

Physical characteristics
- Source: Addi Selam
  - location: Hagere Selam municipality
  - elevation: 2,510 m (8,230 ft)
- Mouth: Giba River
  - location: Barashuwa in Abergele (woreda)
  - coordinates: 13.528°N 39.878°E
  - elevation: 1,266 m (4,154 ft)
- Length: 50 km (31 mi)
- Basin size: 216 km^{2} (83 mi^{2})
- Width
  - average: 40 m (130 ft)
- Discharge
  - location: Abiy Addi bridge
  - maximum: 270 m^{3}/s (9,500 cu ft/s)
- Discharge
  - location: Confluence with Giba
  - maximum: 543 m^{3}/s (19,200 cu ft/s)

Basin features
- Progression: Giba→ Tekezé→ Atbarah→ Nile→ Mediterranean Sea
- River system: Permanent river
- Landmarks: Abiy Addi
- Tributaries
  - left: Adawro River, Arwadito, May Qoqah, Tsech'i River
- Waterbodies: Chini (reservoir)
- Waterfalls: Rapids
- Bridges: Abiy Addi
- Topography: Mountains and deep gorges

The Tanqwa is a river of northern Ethiopia. Rising in the mountains of Dogu’a Tembien (2510 metres above sea level), it flows westward to Giba River which empties finally in the Tekezé River.

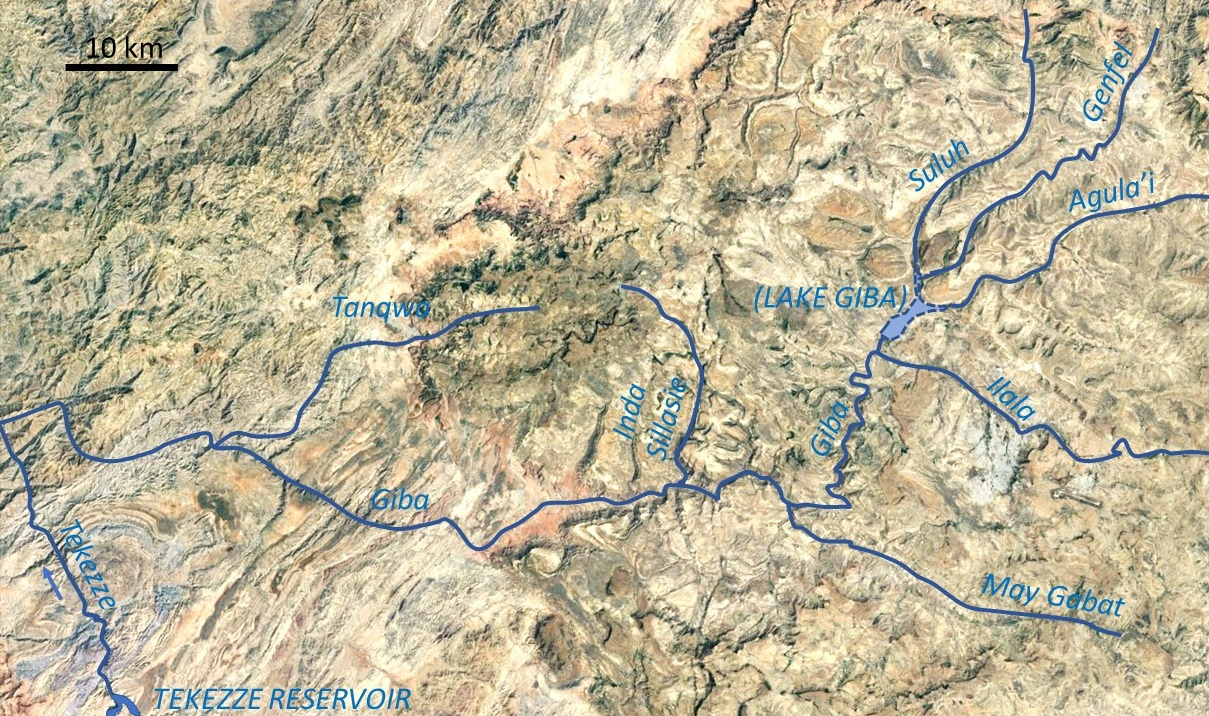
Giba drainage network

== Hydrography ==
It is a confined river, locally meandering in its narrow alluvial plain, with a slope gradient of 25 metres per kilometre. With its tributaries, the river has cut a deep gorge.

=== Tributaries ===
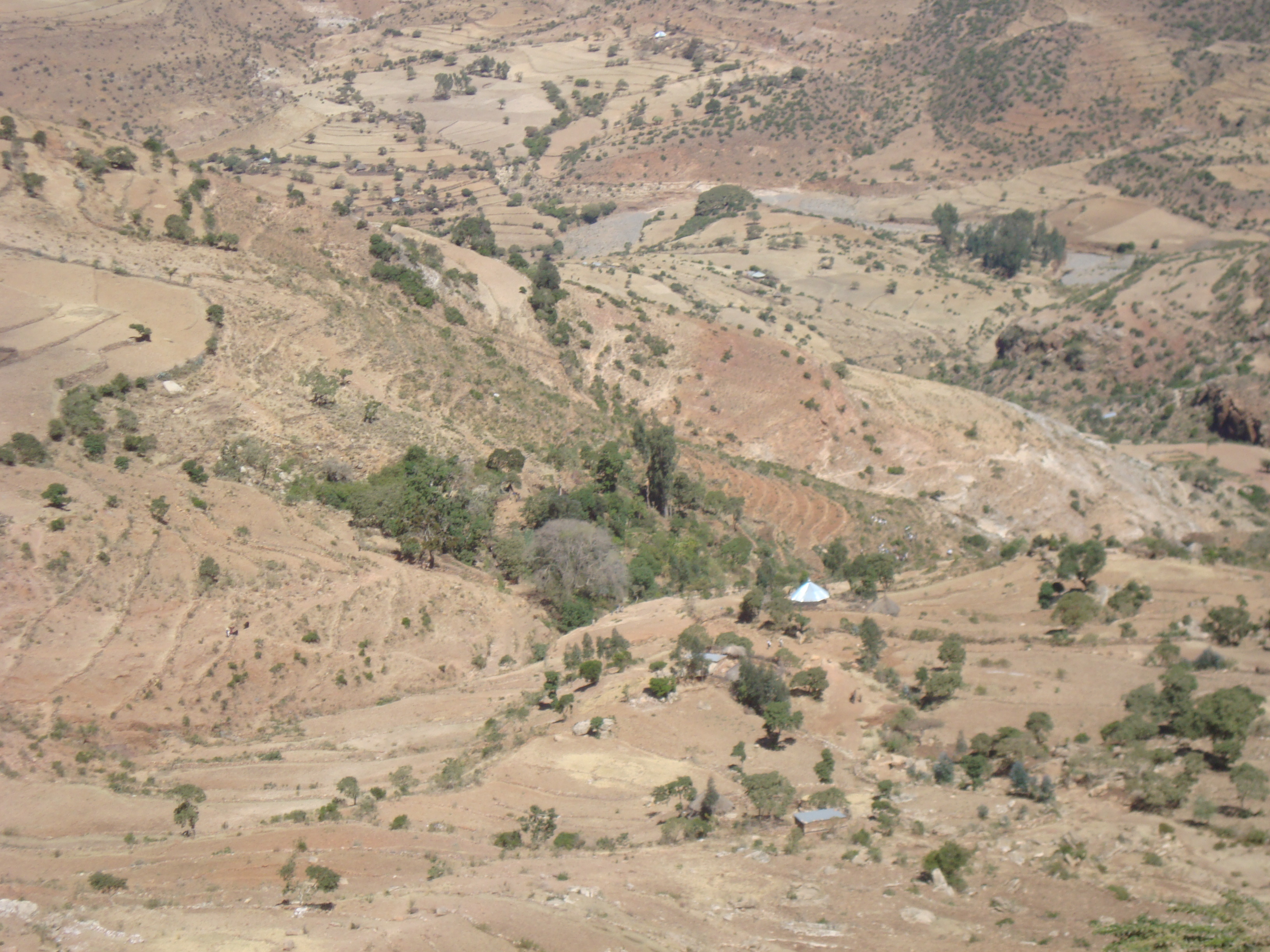
Upper Tanqwa

Tributaries, upstream from Abiy Addi, include

- Tsech'i River
- May Qoqah
- Arwadito
- Adawro River

== Hydrology ==
=== Hydrological characteristics ===
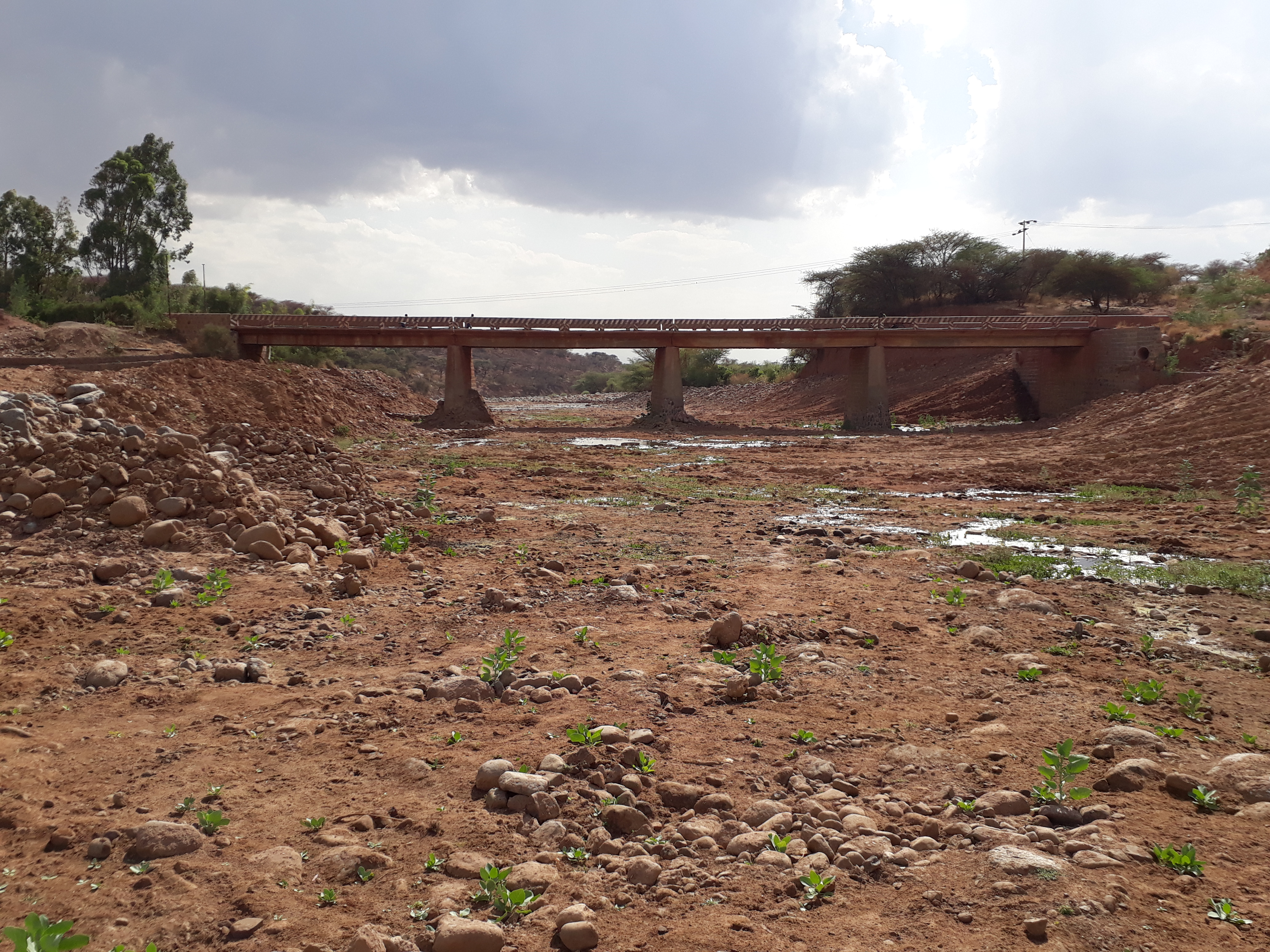
Tanqwa bridge at Abiy Addi

The runoff footprint or annual total runoff volume is 41 million m³ at the bridge in Abiy Addi and 79 million m³ at the confluence with Giba River at Barashuwa. Peak discharges up to 543 m³ per second occur in the second part of the rainy season (month of August) when there are strong rains and the soils are saturated with water in many places. The percentage of total rainfall that directly leaves the catchment as storm runoff (also called runoff coefficient) is 23%. This is high, in comparison to other rivers of the Giba River basin, and has been explained by the fact that the larger part of the Tanqwa basin is composed of impervious rocks, particularly Ashangi Basalts, Alaji Basalts and Precambrian basement rocks. The total amount of sediment that is transported by this river amounts to 596,000 tonnes per year. Median sediment concentration in the river water is 3.95 grammes per litre, but may go up to 68 g/L. The highest sediment concentrations occur at the beginning of the rainy season, when loose soil and dust is washed away by overland flow and ends up in the river. As such water contains many nutrients (locally it is called "aygi"), farmers estimate that it strengthens their cattle, which they will bring to the river. All in all, average sediment yield is 3627 tonnes per km^{2} and per year. All measurements were done at purposively installed stations, in the years 2006–2007.

=== Flash floods ===
Runoff mostly occurs in the form of high runoff discharge events that occur in a very short period (called flash floods). These are related to the steep topography, often little vegetation cover and intense convective rainfall. The peaks of such flash floods have often a 50 to 100 times larger discharge than the preceding baseflow. These flash floods mostly occur during the evening or night, because the convective rain showers occur in the afternoon.

=== Changes over time ===
Evidence given by Italian aerial photographs of the catchment, taken in the 1930s show that 63% of the catchment was covered with woody vegetation (against 32% in 2014). This vegetation could slow down runoff and the runoff coefficient was smaller (13% in 1935 against 23% in 2014). As a consequence, discharges in the river were less and the river was narrower than today. Up to the 1980s, there was strong pressure on the environment, and much vegetation disappeared. This river had its greatest discharges and width in that period. The magnitude of floods in this river has however been decreased in recent years due to interventions in the catchment. On other steep slopes, exclosures have been established; the dense vegetation largely contributes to enhanced infiltration, less flooding and better baseflow. Physical conservation structures such as stone bunds and check dams also intercept runoff.

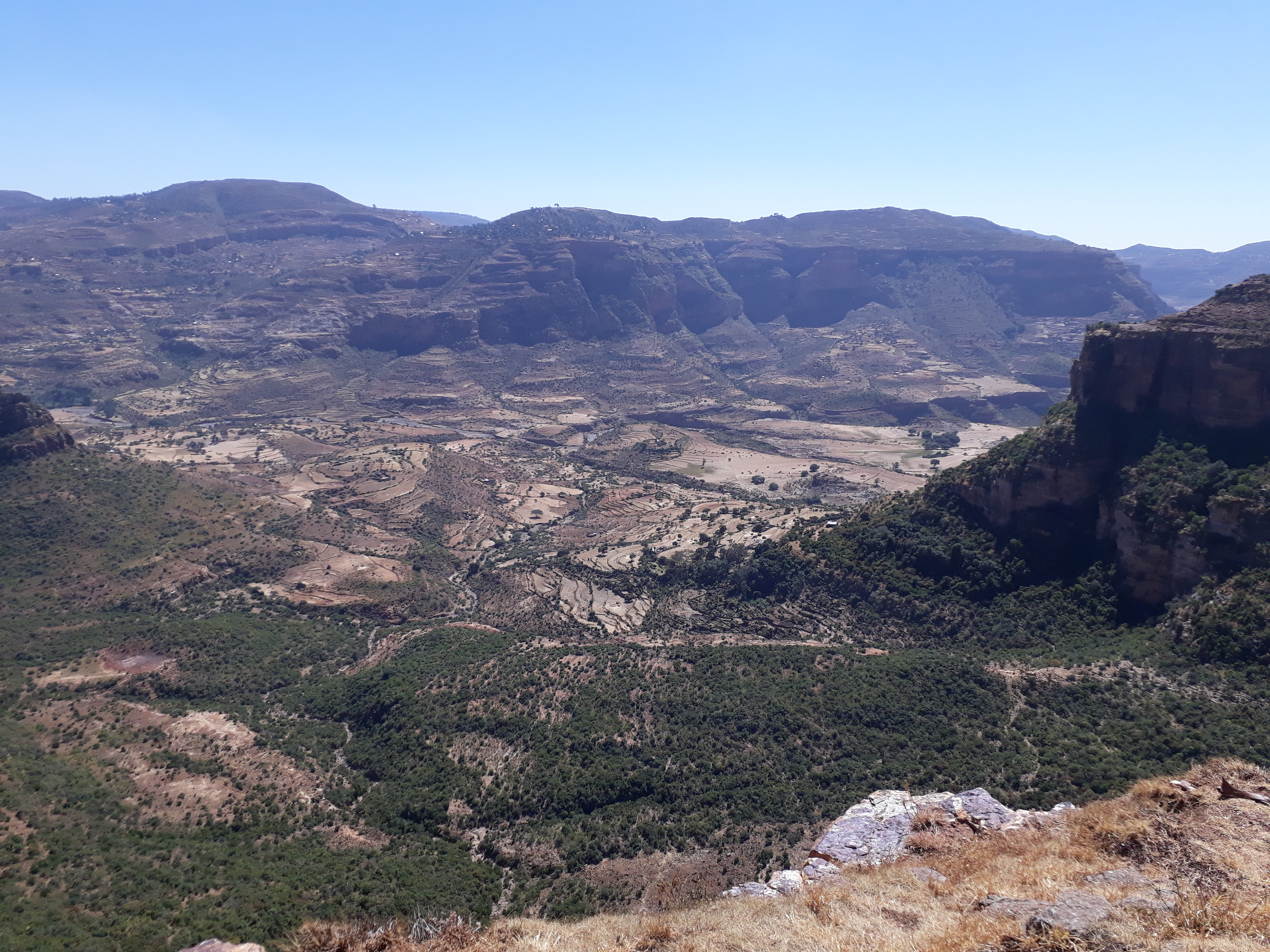
Tanqwa gorge at Ruba Dirho

== Transhumance towards the river gorge ==
The valley bottoms in the gorges of this river have been identified as a transhumance destination zone. Transhumance takes place in the summer rainy season, when the lands near the villages are occupied by crops. Young shepherds will take the village cattle down to the gorge and overnight in small caves. The gorges are particularly attractive as a transhumance destination zone, because there is water and good growth of semi-natural vegetation.

== Boulders and pebbles in the river bed ==
Boulders and pebbles encountered in the river bed can originate from any location higher up in the catchment. In the uppermost stretches of the river, only rock fragments of the upper lithological units will be present in the river bed, whereas more downstream one may find a more comprehensive mix of all lithologies crossed by the river. From upstream to downstream, the following lithological units occur in the catchment.

- Phonolite plugs
- Upper basalt
- Interbedded lacustrine deposits
- Lower basalt
- Amba Aradam Formation
- Antalo Limestone
- Adigrat Sandstone
- Edaga Arbi Glacials
- Precambrian basement rocks

== Natural boundary ==
During its course, this river passes through nine municipalities and three woredas and constitutes six different borders. From upstream to downstream:

- Border between Hagere Selam and Melfa, both in Dogu’a Tembien
- Border between Lim'at and Melfa, both in Dogu’a Tembien
- Border between Aregen and Melfa, both in Dogu’a Tembien
- Border between Aregen and Degol Woyane, both in Dogu’a Tembien
- Border between Aregen (Dogu’a Tembien) and Geramba (Kola Tembien)
- Crosses the town of Abiy Addi
- Border between Kola Tembien and Abergele (woreda)

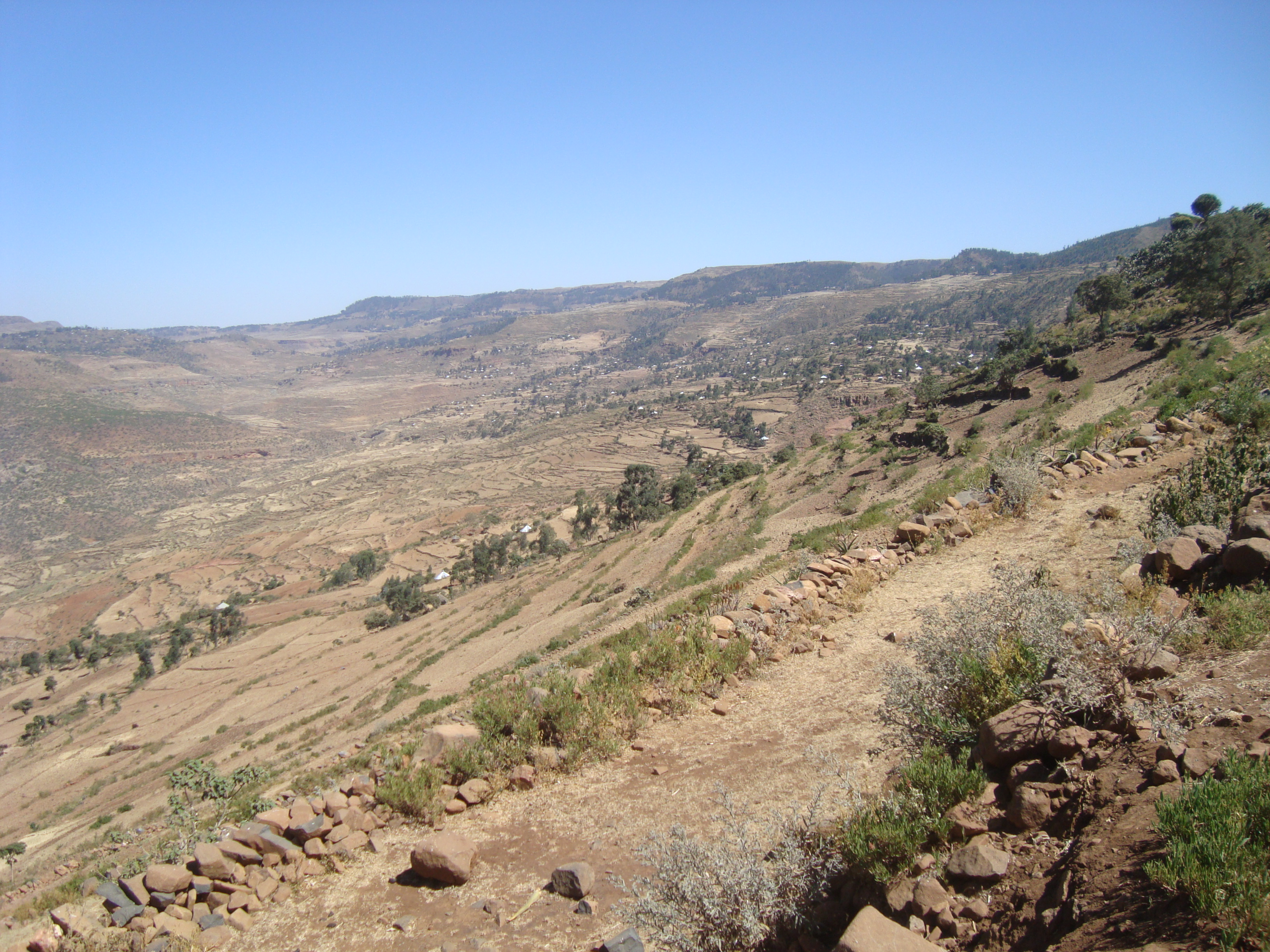
Upper Tanqwa valley

== Trekking along the river ==
Trekking routes have been established across and along this river. The tracks are not marked on the ground but can be followed using downloaded .GPX files.

- Trek 6, along the middle Tanqwa course
- Trek 20, along the upper Tanqwa course

In the rainy season, flash floods may occur and it is advised not to follow the river bed. Frequently, it is then also impossible to wade across the river.

== See also ==
- List of Ethiopian rivers
