= Shenbagavalli Dam =

- Country: India
- Location: Kerala(previously in Tamilnadu)
- Purpose: irrigation
- Status: Damaged
- Construction began: 1873

Shenbagavalli Dam is a check dam built across the Shenbagavalli River at Kerala. It was used for irrigation around 36,000 acres in districts Tirunelveli, Virudhunagar and Tuticorin. A section of the dam was damaged and was rectified in 1955. In 1967, due to flood 1,480-metre-long channel was damaged and then reconstruction was not held. Sivagiri Farmers Association had filed a petition in the Madras High Court demanding the renovation of the dam. The court gave a direction to Kerala government to renovate the dam. But, Kerala government doesn't take any action.

== History ==
Sivagiri Zamin entered into an agreement with the Kingdom of Travancore in 1873 for constructing a dam.
