= Liman irrigation system =

Desert irrigation by floodwater dam

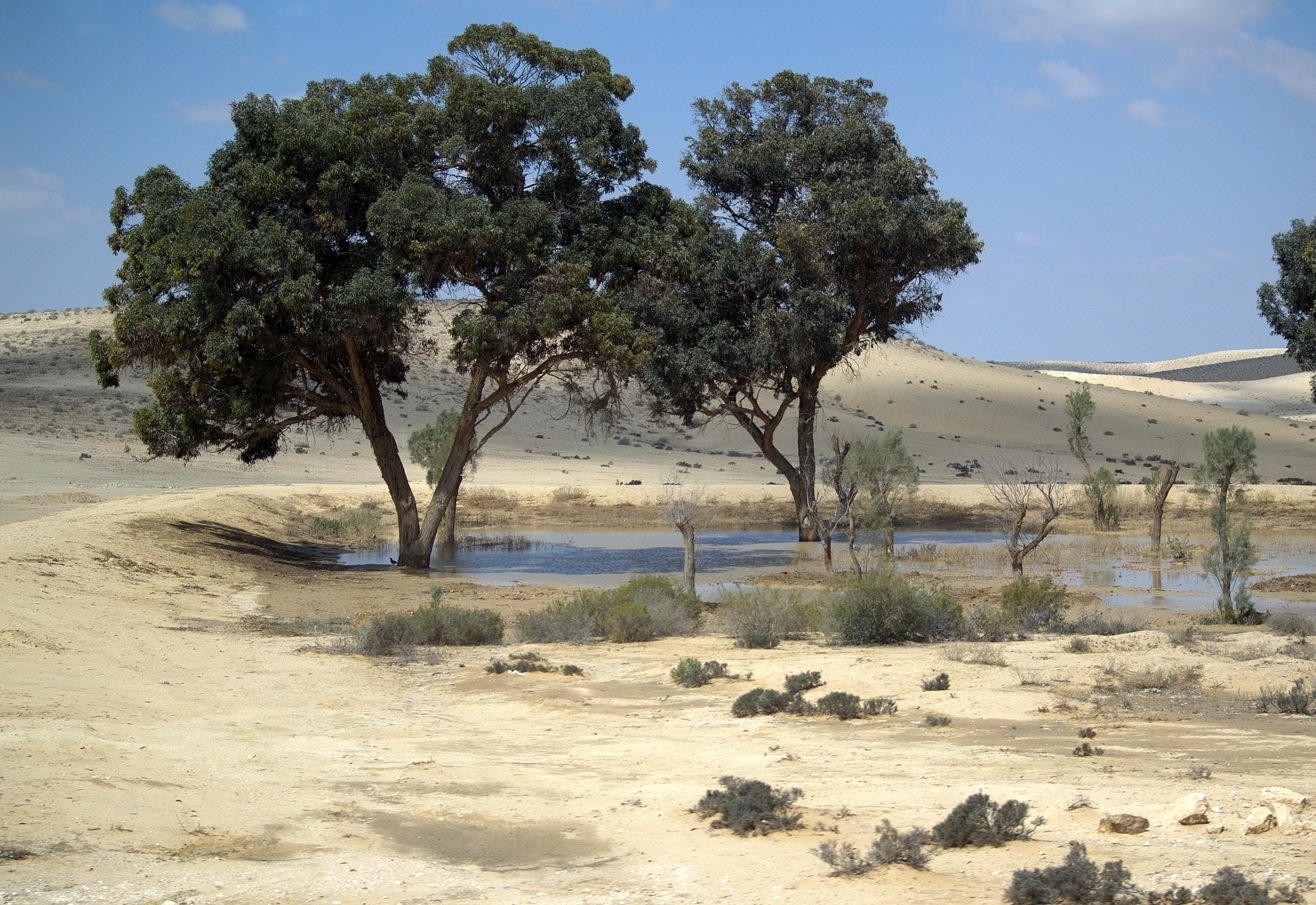
A liman created by the JNF in the Negev Desert.

A Liman (from Greek λιμήν) in Israel is the name for an artificial earthen construction used to collect floodwater by damming a desert wadi. The runoff water is slowed by the dam, thus flooding a small area and allowing the water to infiltrate into the soil. This way, a small groves of trees can be sustained in the desert. The JNF-KKL has been funding the construction of limans in the Negev Desert.

== Introduction ==
Limans were built in order to fight desertification without depleting groundwater resources, which are becoming increasingly rare in arid ecosystems. Remaining soil humidity can be found in dry river beds (wadis) after rains occur, but these wadis are prone to flash floods. The result is massive soil erosion and the destruction of infrastructure. Also, the infiltration is insufficient because of the water's velocity, even though the runoff would be able to allow for the growth of trees in appropriate places. The aim of building limans is to stop flash floods and to increase water infiltration, thus sustaining the growth of drought-hardy tree species and vegetation underneath them.

== Design ==
Limans are structures with small dams which catch runoff from a wadi to hold about 400-600mm of water, which suffices for the growth of drought-hardy tree species. Limans can be built wherever tributary wadis [...] widen or come onto a large plain with potential arable land [...]. A check-dam [...] is built to retain runoff waters [...]. A spillway regulates the level of the water [...] to prevent the destruction of the check-dam.. The embankment height should be 3–4 times the designed water depth, and the outlet should be to the side of the main flow to prevent direct through flow. Also, grazers should be excluded from the site to prevent soil compaction which would in turn decrease water infiltration.

== Suitable tree species ==
Because of its fast growth, Eucalyptus occidentalis was mostly used in the past. However, some scientific studies have had better results with Eucalyptus sargentii. Overall, any drought-hardy species are suitable, such as tamarind, acacia, prosopis, pistachio, eucalyptus, date palm and carob.

== Effects ==
Before the invention of Limans, their creators as well as scientists expected several positive and/or negative impacts:

- They expected a negative soil salinisation due to salt deposition and/or high evaporation rates. This was not the case.
- Carbon sequestration: Because of the biomass increase, a CO_{2} uptake is expected.
- Scientists were hoping for a methane uptake, but it could not be measured in limans. Instead, they found a shallow zone of methane production.
- Because desert crusts prevent rainwater from infiltrating the ground, they generate surface run-off that can lead to flash floods and to top-soil erosion. Limans prevent both the loss of surface runoff and of topsoil, as well as plant nutrients. On top of that, they provide a controlled place to deposit these resources.
- So far, no ecological research has been conducted on biodiversity within limans.

== See also ==
- Check dam
- Johad
- Taanka
- Tank cascade system
