= Lim'at =

Municipality in Ethiopia

Lim'at Maygwa
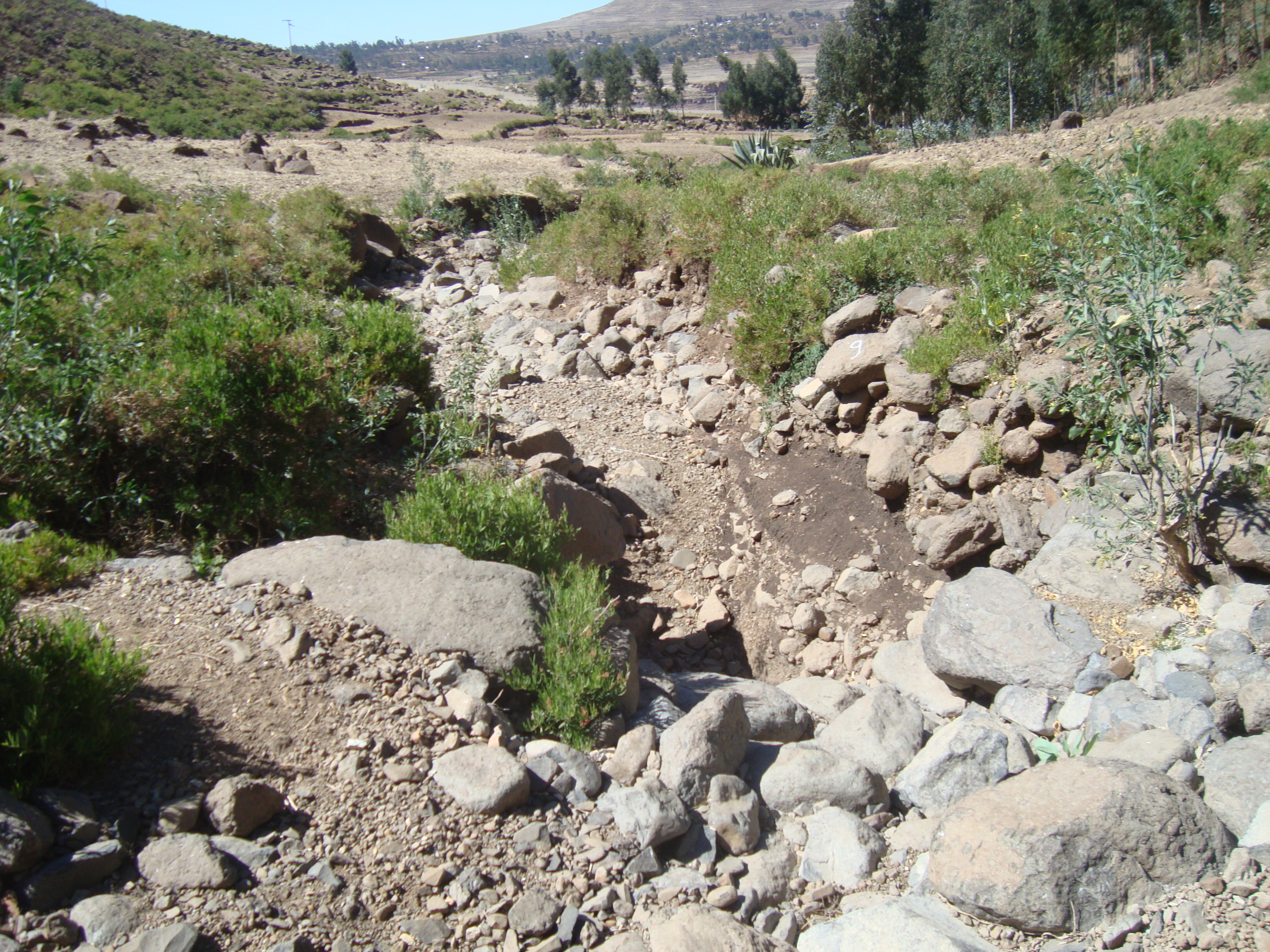
- Farmlands in Lim'at

- Location within Ethiopia
- Coordinates: 13°37′N 39°8′E
- Country: Ethiopia
- Region: Tigray
- Zone: Debub Misraqawi (Southeastern)
- Woreda: Dogu'a Tembien

Area
  - Total: 17.90 km^{2} (6.91 sq mi)
- Elevation: 2,620 m (8,600 ft)

Population (2007)
  - Total: 5,362
  - Density: 299/km^{2} (770/sq mi)
- Time zone: UTC+3 (EAT)

Lim'at is a tabia in the Dogu'a Tembien district of the Tigray Region of Ethiopia. The tabia centre is in Maygwa village, located approximately 8 km to the southwest of the woreda town Hagere Selam.

== Geography ==
The tabia stretches down from the Tsatsen plateau (2810 m a.s.l.), across the main road towards Zeleqwa (Upper Tanqwa) river (2270 m a.s.l.).

=== Geology ===
From the higher to the lower locations, the following geological formations are present:

- Upper basalt
- Interbedded lacustrine deposits
- Lower basalt
- Amba Aradam Formation
- Antalo Limestone
- Quaternary alluvium and freshwater tufa

=== Geomorphology and soils ===
The main geomorphic unit is the Hagere Selam Highlands. Corresponding soil types are:

- Associated soil types
  - shallow soils with high stone contents (Skeletic Cambisol, Leptic Cambisol, Skeletic Regosol)
  - moderately deep dark stony clays with good natural fertility (Vertic Cambisol)
  - deep, dark cracking clays, temporarily waterlogged during the wet season (Pellic Vertisol)
- Inclusions
  - Rock outcrops and very shallow soils (Lithic Leptosol)
  - Rock outcrops and very shallow soils on limestone (Calcaric Leptosol)
  - Deep dark cracking clays with very good natural fertility, waterlogged during the wet season (Chromic Vertisol, Pellic Vertisol)
  - Shallow stony dark loams on calcaric material (Calcaric Regosol, Calcaric Cambisol)
  - Brown loamy soils on basalt with good natural fertility (Luvisol)

=== Climate and hydrology ===
==== Climate and meteorology ====
The rainfall pattern shows a very high seasonality with 70 to 80% of the annual rain falling in July and August. Mean temperature in Maygwa is 17 °C, oscillating between average daily minimum of 9.4 °C and maximum of 24.4 °C. The contrasts between day and night air temperatures are much larger than seasonal contrasts.

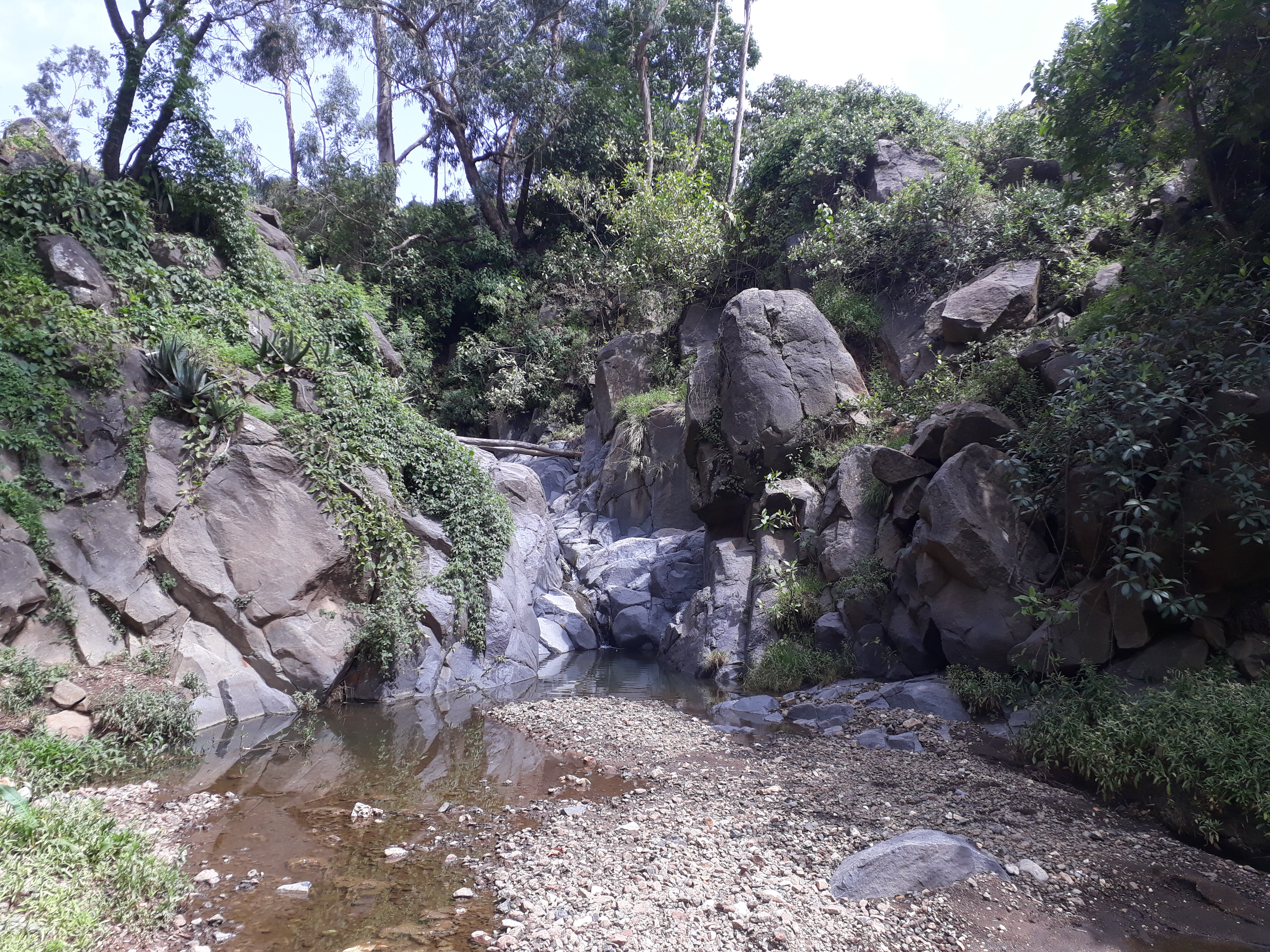
May Qoqah

==== Rivers ====
The Giba River's tributary, the Tanqwa is the most important river in the surroundings of the tabia. It flows towards Tekezze River and further on to the Nile. The rivers have incised deep gorges which characterise the landscape. The drainage network of the tabia is organised as follows:

- Giba River
  - Zeleqwa River, in tabias Melfa and Lim'at, which becomes Ruba Dirho in Aregen and Degol Woyane, and Tanqwa River, in the woredas Kola Tembien and Abergele (woreda)
    - Adawro River, in tabia Lim'at
    - Arwadito River, in tabia Lim'at
    - May Qoqah, in tabia Lim'at

Whereas they are (nearly) dry during most of the year, during the main rainy season, these rivers carry high runoff discharges, sometimes in the form of flash floods. Especially at the begin of the rainy season they are brown-coloured, evidencing high soil erosion rates.

==== Springs ====
As there are no permanent rivers, the presence of springs is of utmost importance for the local people. The main springs in the tabia are:

- Mhtsab Alabu in Adawro
- Hamute

==== Water harvesting ====
In this area with rains that last only for a couple of months per year, reservoirs of different sizes allow harvesting runoff from the rainy season for further use in the dry season.

- Traditional surface water harvesting ponds, particularly in places without permanent springs, called rahaya
- Horoyo, household ponds, recently constructed through campaigns

=== Settlements ===
The tabia centre Maygwa holds a few administrative offices, a health post, a primary school, and some small shops. Saturday is the market day. There are a few more primary schools across the tabia. The main other populated places are:

- Addi Gerahti
- Hahawti
- Agerbi'a
- Adawro
- Ksad Adawro

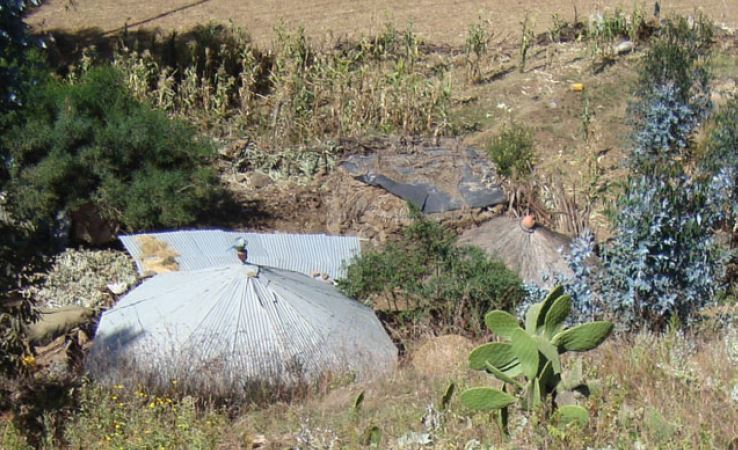
Homestead in Adawro

=== Vegetation and exclosures ===
The tabia holds several exclosures, areas that are set aside for regreening, such as Adawro exclosure. Wood harvesting and livestock range are not allowed there. Besides effects on biodiversity, water infiltration, protection from flooding, sediment deposition, carbon sequestration, people commonly have economic benefits from these exclosures through grass harvesting, beekeeping and other non-timber forest products. The local inhabitants also consider it as "land set aside for future generations".

== Agriculture and livelihood ==
The population lives essentially from crop farming, supplemented with off-season work in nearby towns. The land is dominated by farmlands which are clearly demarcated and are cropped every year. Hence the agricultural system is a permanent upland farming system. The farmers have adapted their cropping systems to the spatio-temporal variability in rainfall.

== History and culture ==
=== History ===
The history of the tabia is strongly confounded with the history of Tembien.

=== Religion ===
Most inhabitants are Orthodox Christians.

=== Inda Siwa, the local beer houses ===
In the main villages, there are traditional beer houses (Inda Siwa), often in unique settings, where people socialise. Well known in the tabia are

- Amete Kiros at Agerbi'a
- Tekien Gebresellasie at Maygua
- Tekien Alemayehu at Maygua

== Roads and communication ==
The main road Mekelle – Hagere Selam – Abiy Addi runs across the tabia. There are regular bus services to these towns.

== Tourism ==
Its mountainous nature and proximity to Mekelle make the tabia fit for tourism. As compared to many other mountain areas in Ethiopia the villages are quite accessible, and during walks visitors may be invited for coffee, lunch or even for an overnight stay in a rural homestead.

=== Geotouristic sites ===
The high variability of geological formations and the rugged topography invite for geological and geographic tourism or "geotourism". Geosites in the tabia include:

- May Qoqah river with permanent baseflow and gully control structures (log dams and check dams)
- Views on Melfa, with debris flows
- Adawro Ch'erkos church forest, dominated by Euphorbia candelabra
- Views from Tsatsen plateau to the wider surroundings

=== Trekking routes ===
Trekking routes have been established in this tabia. The tracks are not marked on the ground but can be followed using downloaded .GPX files.

- Trek 7, across the tabia to Debre Sema'it rock church, and on to Abiy Addi
- Trek 8, at the southeastern edge of the tabia over the Tsatsen plateau through Inda Maryam Qorar to Zeyi cave and on the Giba River gorge
- Trek 20 follows May Qoqah River and then the deep Zeleqwa gorge

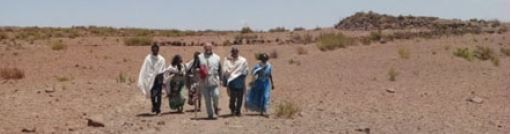
Along trek 8 on Tsatsen plateau

== See also ==
- Dogu'a Tembien district.
