= Adawro exclosure =

Exclosure for woodland restoration in Ethiopia

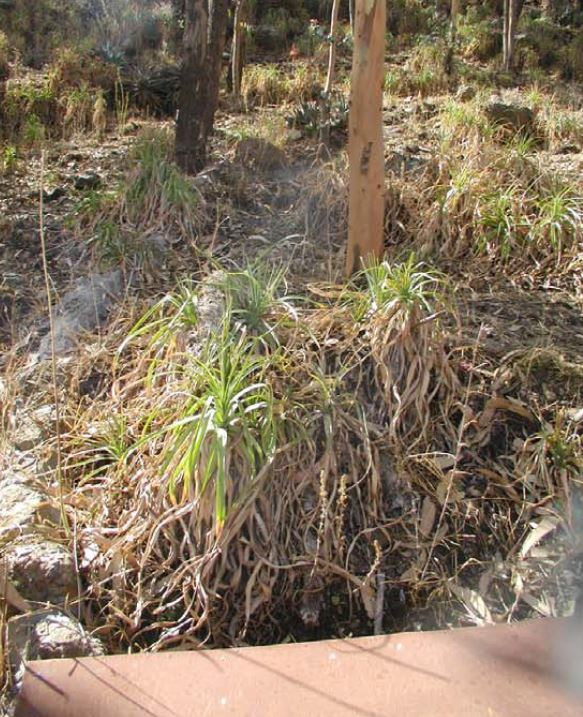
- Adawro exclosure, here with eucalypts

- Location within Ethiopia
- Location: Lim'at municipality, in Dogu'a Tembien district, Ethiopia
- Nearest city: Hagere Selam
- Coordinates: 13.622°N 39.154°E
- Established: 1999

Adawro is an exclosure located in the Dogu'a Tembien woreda of the Tigray Region in Ethiopia. The area has been protected by the local community since 1994.

== Environmental characteristics ==
- Average slope gradient: 70%
- Aspect: the exclosure is oriented towards the northeast
- Minimum altitude: 2,635 metres
- Maximum altitude: 2,705 metres
- Lithology: Basalt

== Management ==
As a general rule, cattle ranging and wood harvesting are not allowed. The grasses are harvested once yearly and taken to the homesteads of the village to feed livestock. Physical soil and water conservation has been implemented to enhance infiltration, and vegetation growth.

== Benefits for the community ==
Setting aside such areas fits with the long-term vision of the communities were hiza'iti lands are set aside for use by the future generations. It has also direct benefits for the community:

- improved infiltration
- improved ground water availability
- honey production
- climate ameliorator (temperature, moisture)
- carbon sequestration, dominantly sequestered in the soil, and additionally in the woody vegetation)

== Water conservation ==
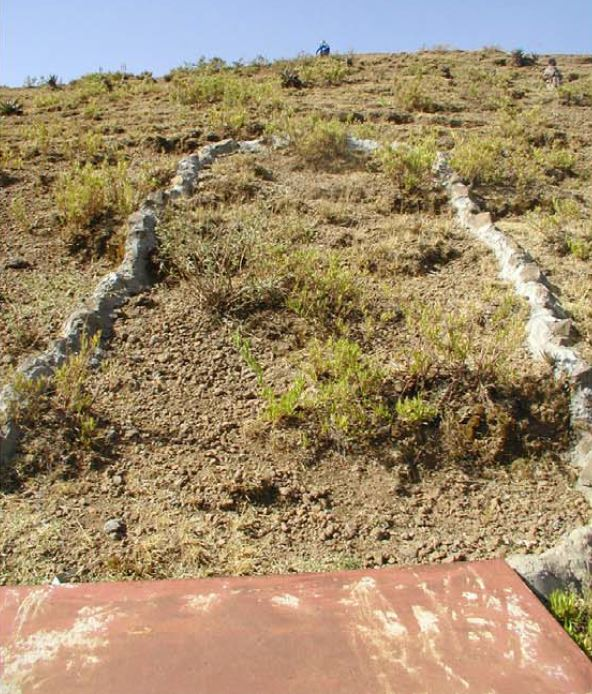
In contrast: the adjacent rangeland

In the Adawro exclosure, more than 800 precise measurements were done in 2003 and 2004, using five runoff plots, where the volume of runoff was measured daily. The rock type (basalt), slope gradient and slope aspect were the same, the only difference was the land management and vegetation density. Whereas in degraded rangeland, 11.4% of the rainfall flows directly away to the river (runoff coefficient), this happens only for 2.5% of the rain in a recent exclosure and 3.2% in a eucalyptus forest. In 2003, the soils of the then young exclosure could hold 280 litres of water per m^{3}, similar to the adjacent rangeland.

== Improved ecosystem ==
With vegetation growth, biodiversity in this exclosure has strongly improved: there is more varied vegetation and wildlife.

=== Trees ===
The main tree species found in the exclosure are:

- Flat top acacia (Acacia abyssinica, renamed as Vachellia abyssinica)
- Golden wattle (Acacia saligna)
- Rumex nervosus, a woody sorrel species
- Aloe macrocarpa

=== Soils ===
Main soil type in the exclosure is Phaeozems formed in sediment that has been trapped by the vegetation of the exclosure, and as a remnant of the original situation before deforestation. Remarkably, also in the well-protected eucalypt plantation there is some undergrowth and soil development.
