= Check dam =

Small dam to counteract erosion

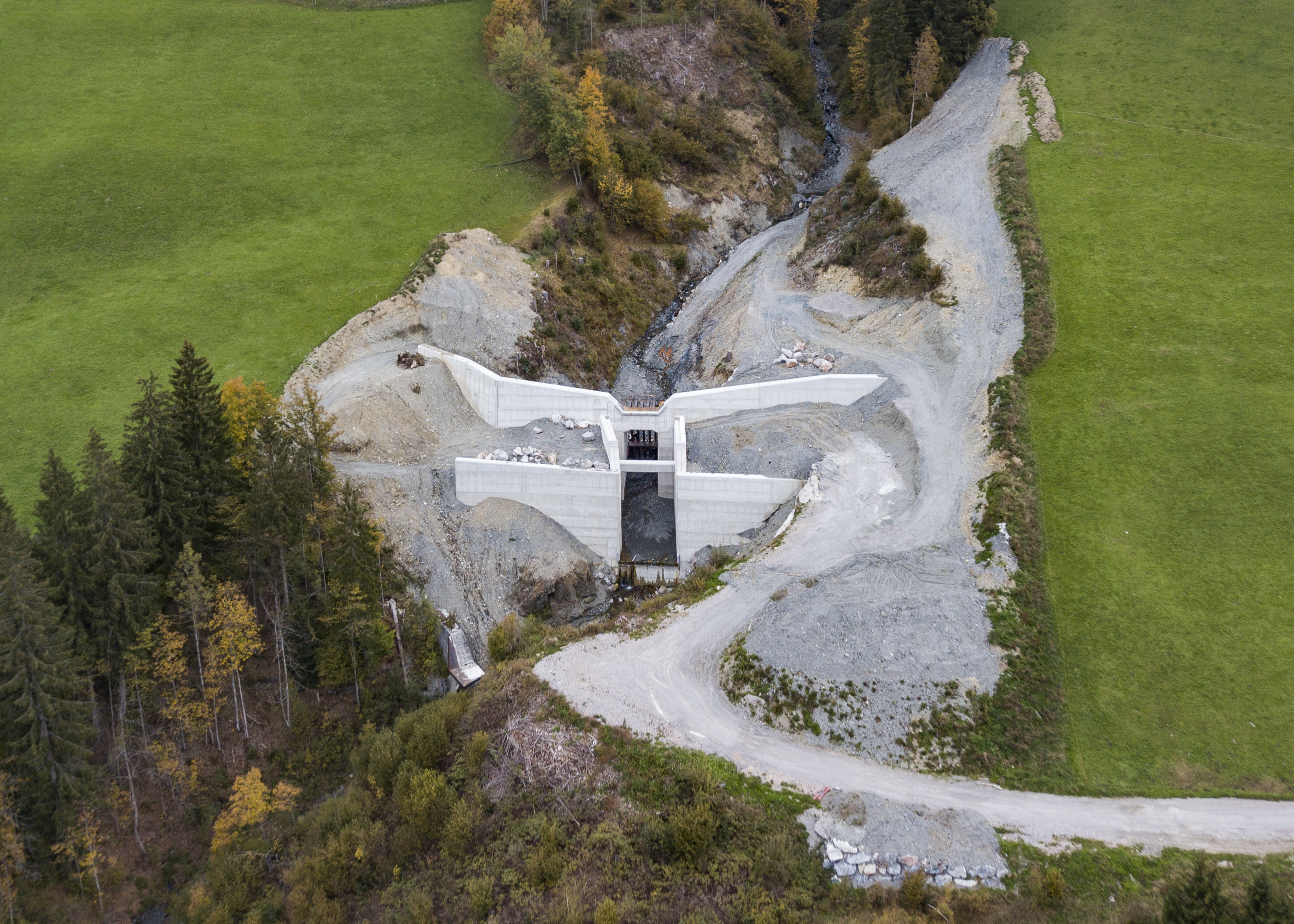
Concrete check dams in Austria

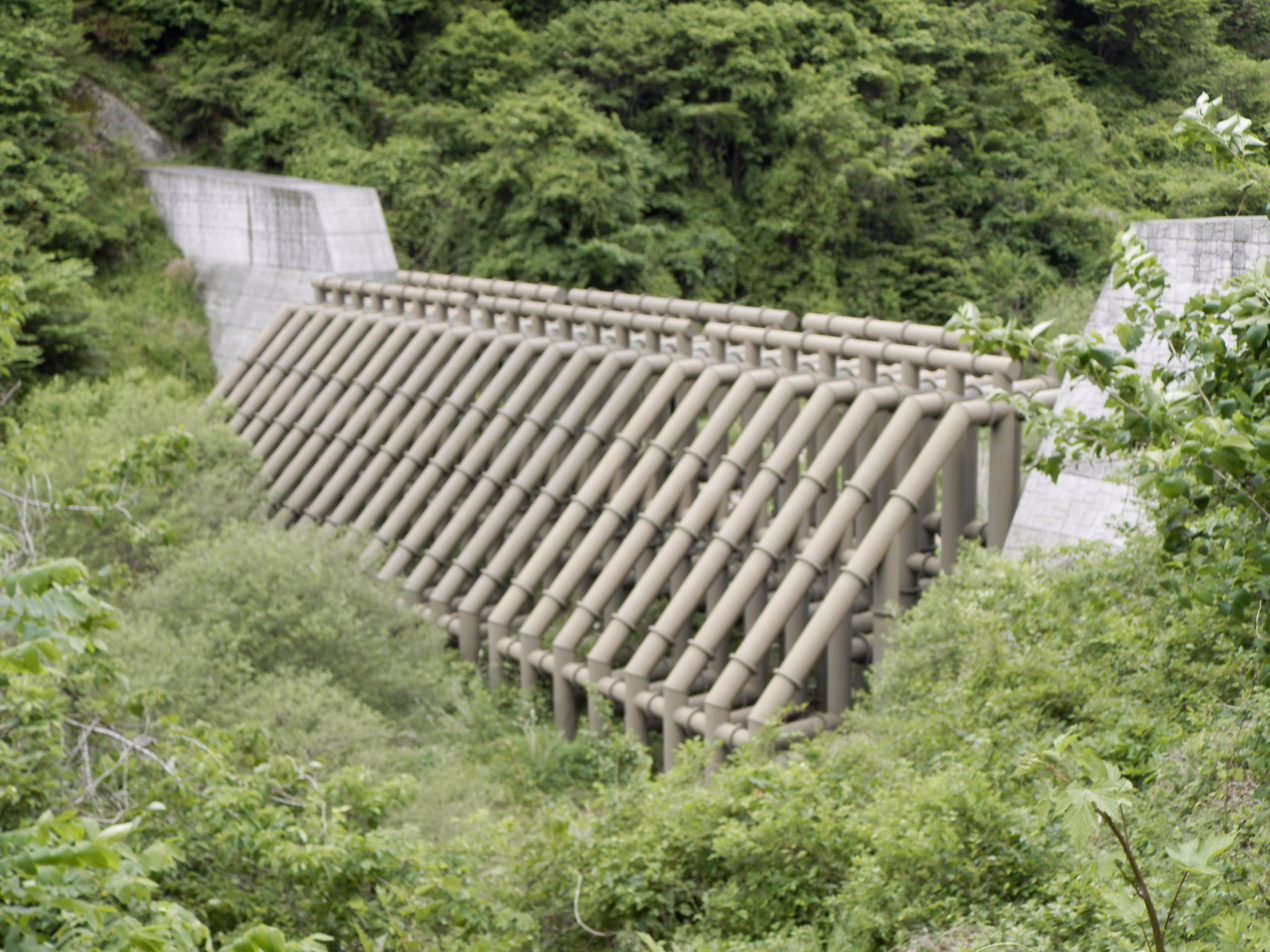
A steel check dam

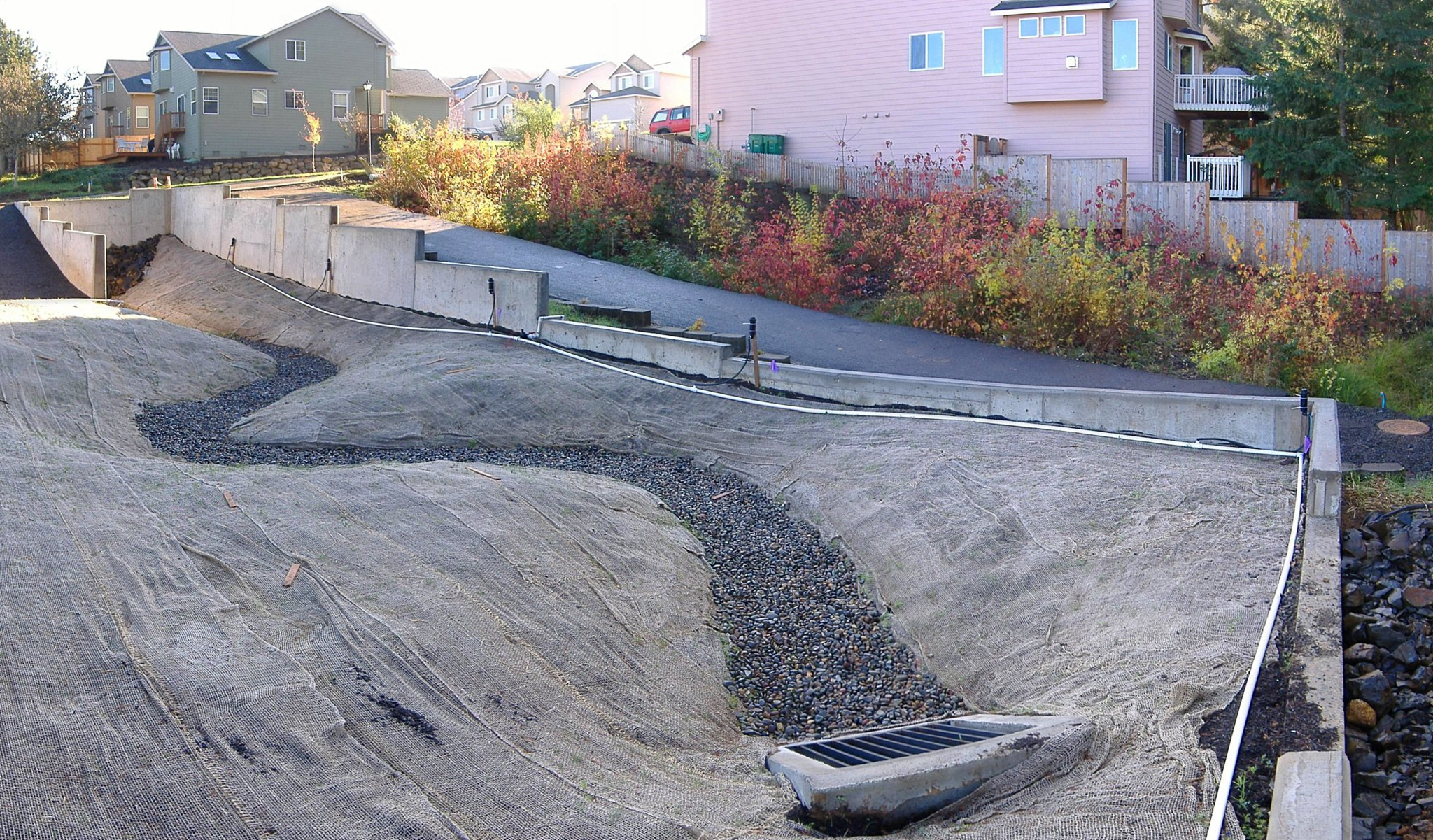
A common application of check dams is in bioswales, which are artificial drainage channels that are designed to remove silt and pollution from runoff.

A check dam is a small, sometimes temporary, dam constructed across a swale, drainage ditch, or waterway to counteract erosion by reducing water flow velocity. Check dams themselves are not a type of new technology; rather, they are an ancient technique dating from the second century AD. Check dams are typically, though not always, implemented in a system of several dams situated at regular intervals across the area of interest.

== Types of Check Dams ==
There are two main categories of check dams. They are:

1) Closed-type check dams. Closed-type check dams have been used commonly for hundreds of years and are constructed without openings to block water and sediment flow. However, closed-type check dams may disrupt natural ecosystems through impeding the natural flow of water and sediment.

2) Open-type check dams. Open-type check dams are likewise constructed across a waterway but have openings to allow for water and sediment to flow more freely. Openings can be created by implementing spaced trusses or beams into the design of the dam. The distance between these openings, based on whether trusses or beams were used in construction, can be designed to achieve a desired rate of sediment passthrough at the check dam. Furthermore, open-type check dams can be constructed to be modifiable, granting communities or governments the ability to better manage sediment and water flow by adding or removing modular sections of the dam.

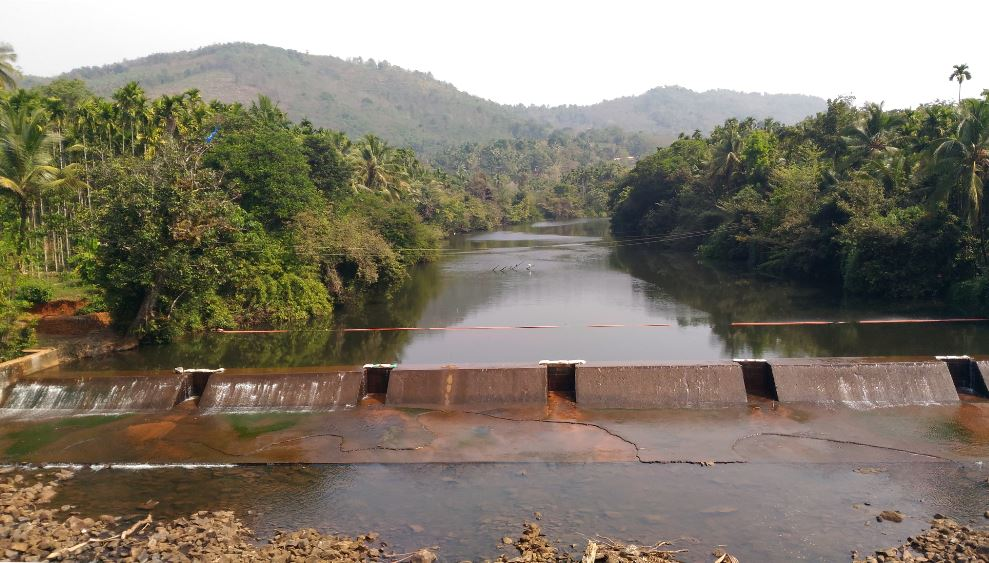
A check dam across the Kudumbur River, in Kerala, India

== Function ==
A check dam placed in a ditch, swale, or channel interrupts the flow of water and flattens the gradient of the channel, thereby reducing the velocity. In turn, this obstruction induces infiltration and reduces erosion. They can be used not only to slow flow velocity but also to distribute flows across a swale to avoid preferential paths and guide flows toward vegetation. Although some sedimentation may result behind the dam, check dams do not primarily function as sediment-trapping devices.

For instance, on the Graliwdo River in Ethiopia, an increase of hydraulic roughness by check dams and water transmission losses in deposited sediments is responsible for the delay of runoff to reach the lower part of the river channels. The reduction of peak runoff discharge was larger in the river segment with check dams and vegetation (minus 12%) than in segment without treatment (minus 5.5%). Reduction of total runoff volume was also larger in the river with check dams than in the untreated river. The implementation of check dams combined with vegetation reduced peak flow discharge and total runoff volume as large parts of runoff infiltrated in the sediments deposited behind the check dams. As gully check dams are implemented in a large areas of northern Ethiopia, this contributes to groundwater recharge and increased river base flow.

== Applications ==
=== Grade control mechanism ===
Check dams have traditionally been implemented in two environments: across channel bottoms and on hilly slopes. Check dams are used primarily to control water velocity, conserve soil, and improve land. They are used when other flow-control practices, such as lining the channel or creating bioswales, are impractical. Accordingly, they are commonly used in degrading temporary channels, in which permanent stabilization is impractical and infeasible in terms of resource allocation and funding due to the short life period. They are also used when construction delays and weather conditions prevent timely installation of other erosion control practices. This is typically seen during the construction process of large-scale permanent dams or erosion control. As such, check dams serve as temporary grade-control mechanisms along waterways until resolute stabilization is established or along permanent swales that need protection prior to installation of a non-erodible lining.

=== Water quality control mechanism ===
Many check dams tend to form stream pools. Under low-flow circumstances, water infiltrates into the ground, evaporates, or seeps through or under the dam. Under high flow – flood – conditions, water flows over or through the structure. Coarse and medium-grained sediment from runoff tends to be deposited behind check dams, while finer grains flow through. Floating garbage is also trapped by check dams, increasing their effectiveness as water quality control measures. In addition to overall water quality, check dams have positive effects on biodiversity both in the water and in the surrounding area. In a study of check dams in the Andes Mountains, check dams were found to be effective in this way by both increasing the mass of organic matter within trapped sediments and the amount of macroinvertebrate individuals found near the dam. These trapped sediments also work as carbon capture. However, these effects may only apply in conditions or environments that are similar to mountainous streams. Additionally, riparian vegetation has been found to increase in the presence of check dams, in turn increasing biodiversity and stabilizing the land with root systems. This has the effect of further reducing erosion, which can contribute to the check dam's overall effectiveness in protecting against disaster. Check dams may be implemented with bioswales to manage stormwater runoff, and those structures together have been shown to be effective in facilitating runoff drainage into the surrounding soil.

=== Arid regions ===
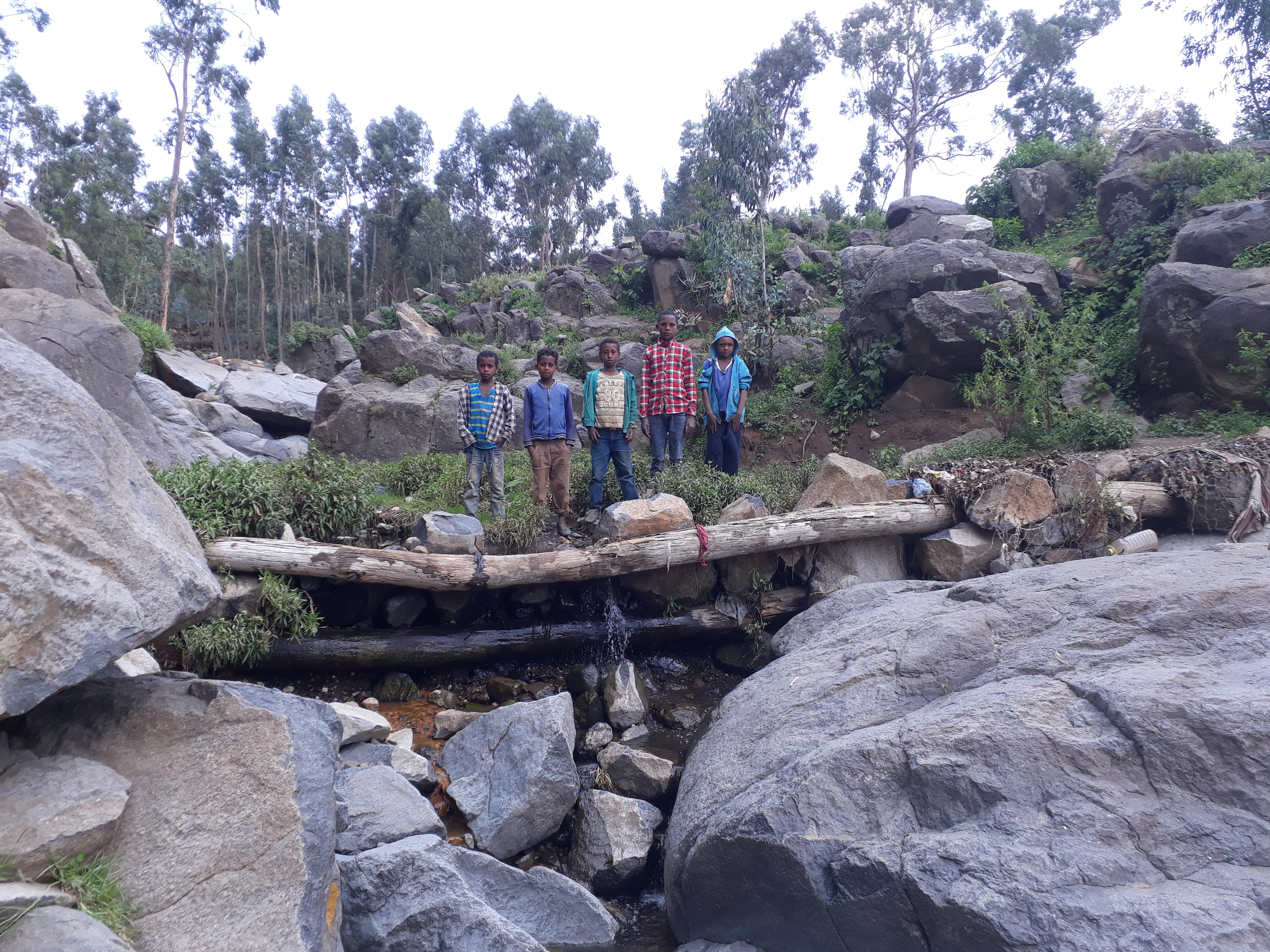
Boulder-faced log dam in Maygwa, Ethiopia

In arid areas, check dams are often built to increase groundwater recharge in a process called managed aquifer recharge. Winter runoff thus can be stored in aquifers, from which the water can be withdrawn during the dry season for irrigation, livestock watering, and drinking water. This is particularly useful for small settlements located far from a large urban center as check dams require less reliance on machinery, funding, or advanced knowledge compared to large-scale dam implementation. Additionally, local civilians can easily monitor and maintain these check dams to ensure optimal groundwater recharge. In one such study in India, it was found that check dams were highly effective when used and maintained for managed aquifer recharge, and the water collected by the dam was used to support around 16 percent of agricultural activity in the surrounding communities being served by the aquifers.

Check dams can be used in combination with limans to stop and collect surface runoff water.

=== Mountainous regions ===
As a strategy to stabilize mountain streams, the construction of check dams has a long tradition in many mountainous regions dating back to the 19th century in Europe. Steep slopes impede access by heavy construction machinery to mountain streams, so check dams have been built in place of larger dams. Because the typical high slope causes high flow velocity, a terraced system of multiple closely spaced check dams is typically necessary to reduce velocity and thereby counteract erosion. Such consolidation check dams, built in terraces, attempt to prevent both headward and downward cutting into channel beds while also stabilizing adjacent hill slopes. They are further used to mitigate flood and debris flow hazards.

Case studies validate the effectiveness of these check dam systems. On the Guerbe River in Switzerland, where a series of over 100 check dams had been implemented to control landslides and other natural debris flow disasters, it was found that the check dams reduced the amount of sediment being carried by the river. The dams did so by flattening out the riverbed and retaining an initial amount of sediment, although the main impact came from the gradient change. However, the benefits of these dams are often erased in the event of a failure, which releases trapped sediment and destabilizes both the riverbed and surrounding land, increasing the risk of disaster.

=== Temporary Test Dams TTDs ===
In the UK planning laws, applications and restrictions delay flood mitigation work. This can be counteracted by setting up Temporary Test Dams in watercourses that can then be monitored and valued. This does however require the landowners support. TTDs have proven to be a great way to get rapid action following a flood event and a way to get communities involved in the defence against future flood events.

== Design considerations ==
=== Site ===
Before installing a check dam, engineers inspect the site. Standard practices call for the drainage area to be ten acres or less. The waterway should be on a slope of no more than 50% and should have a minimum depth to bedrock of 2 ft (0.61 m). Check dams are often used in natural or constructed channels or swales. They should never be placed in live streams unless approved by appropriate local, state and/or federal authorities.

=== Materials ===
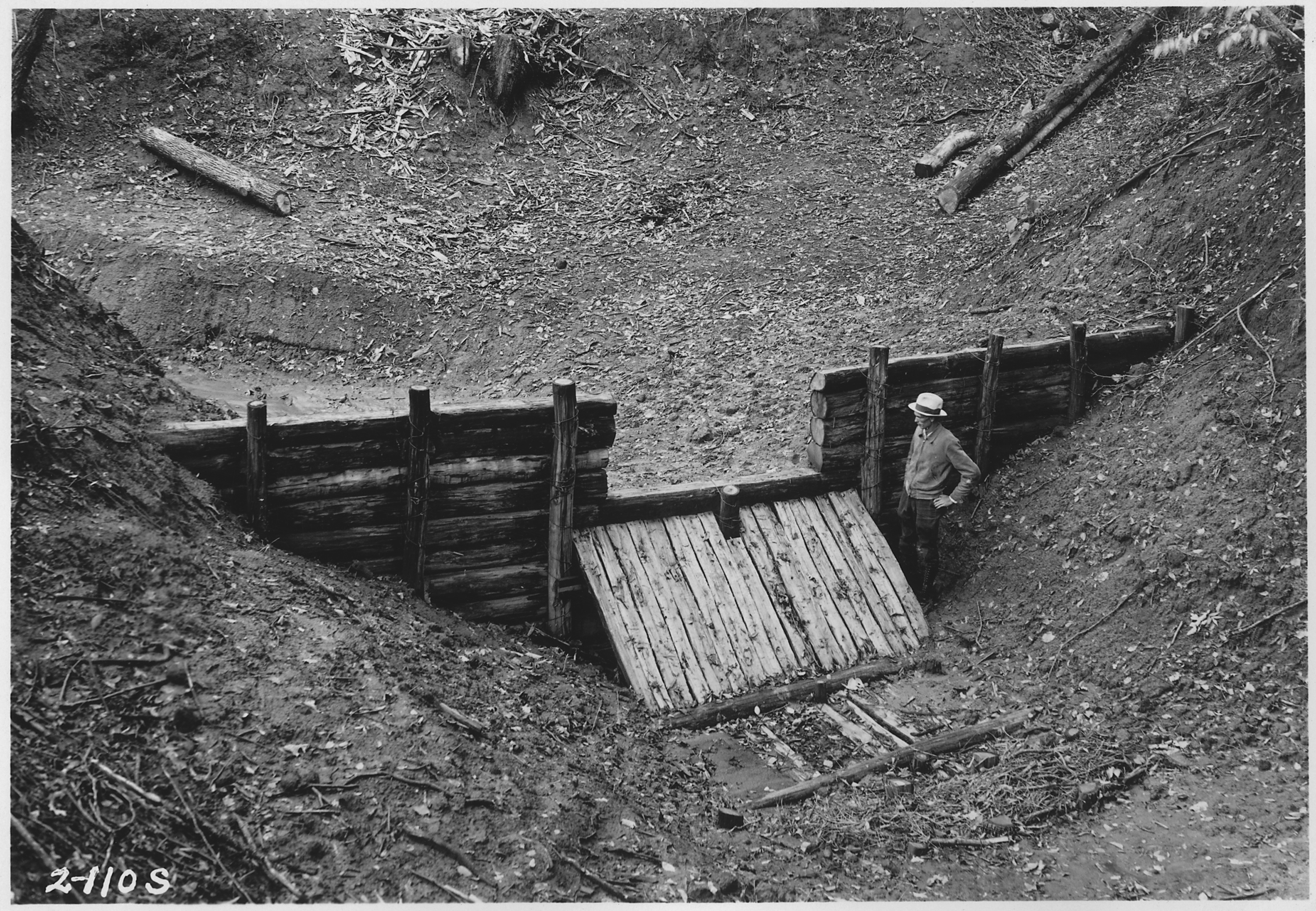
Log dam in a gully, circa 1935, Missouri, US

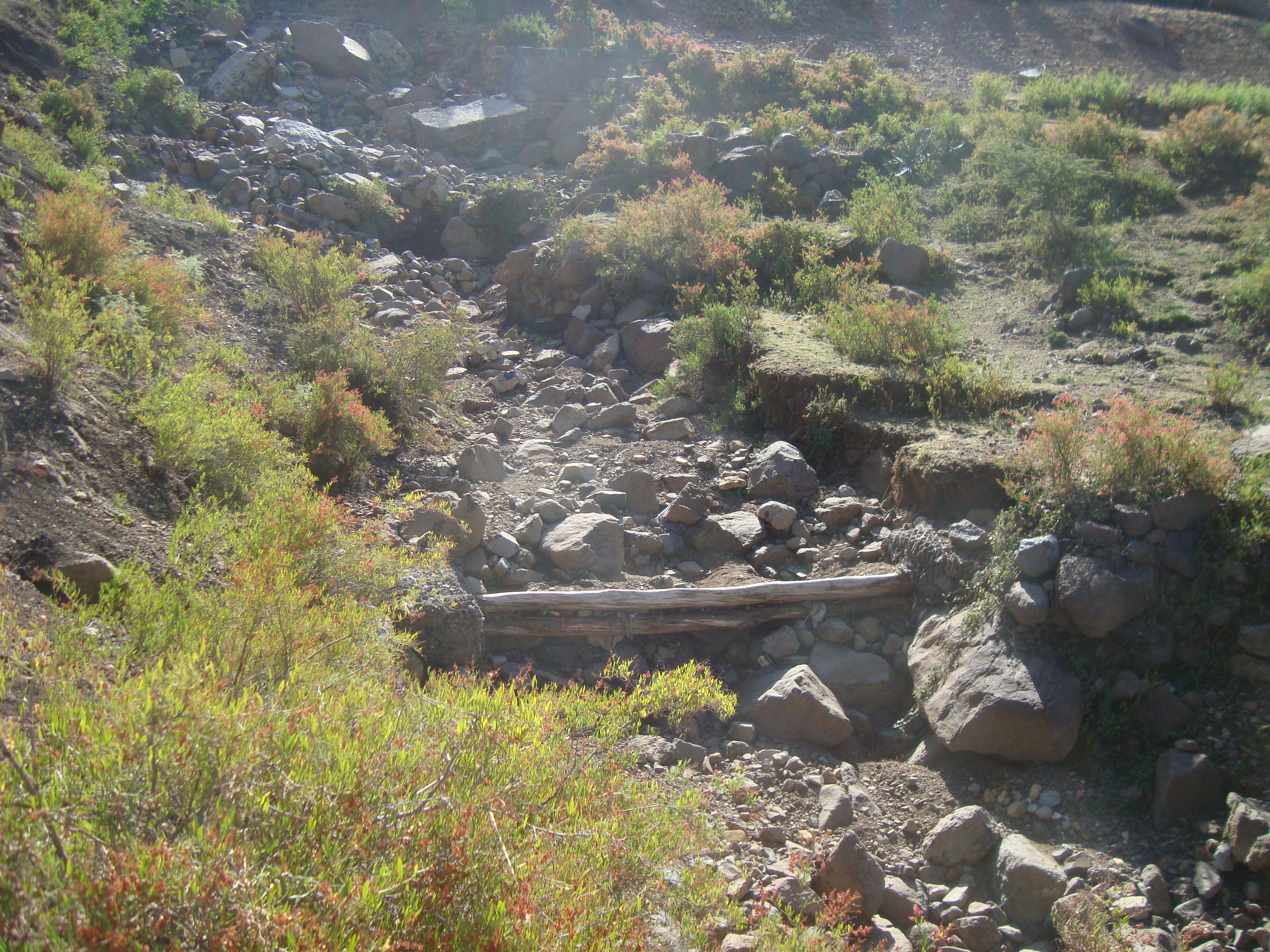
Log dam in Adawro river, Ethiopia

Check dams are made of a variety of materials. Because they are typically used as temporary structures, they are often made of cheap and accessible materials such as rocks, gravel, logs, hay bales, and sandbags. Of these, logs and rock check dams are usually permanent or semi-permanent, and sandbag check dams are built primarily for temporary purposes. Also, there are check dams that are constructed with rockfill or wooden boards. These dams are usually implemented only in small, open channels that drain 10 acres (0.04 km^{2}) or less; and usually do not exceed 2 ft (0.61 m) high. Woven wire can be used to construct check dams in order to hold fine material in a gully. It is typically used in environments where the gully has a moderate slope (less than 10%), small drainage area, and in regions where flood flows do not typically carry large rocks or boulders. In nearly all instances, erosion control blankets, which are biodegradable open-weave blankets, are used in conjunction with check dams. These blankets help encourage vegetation growth on the slopes, shorelines and ditch bottoms.

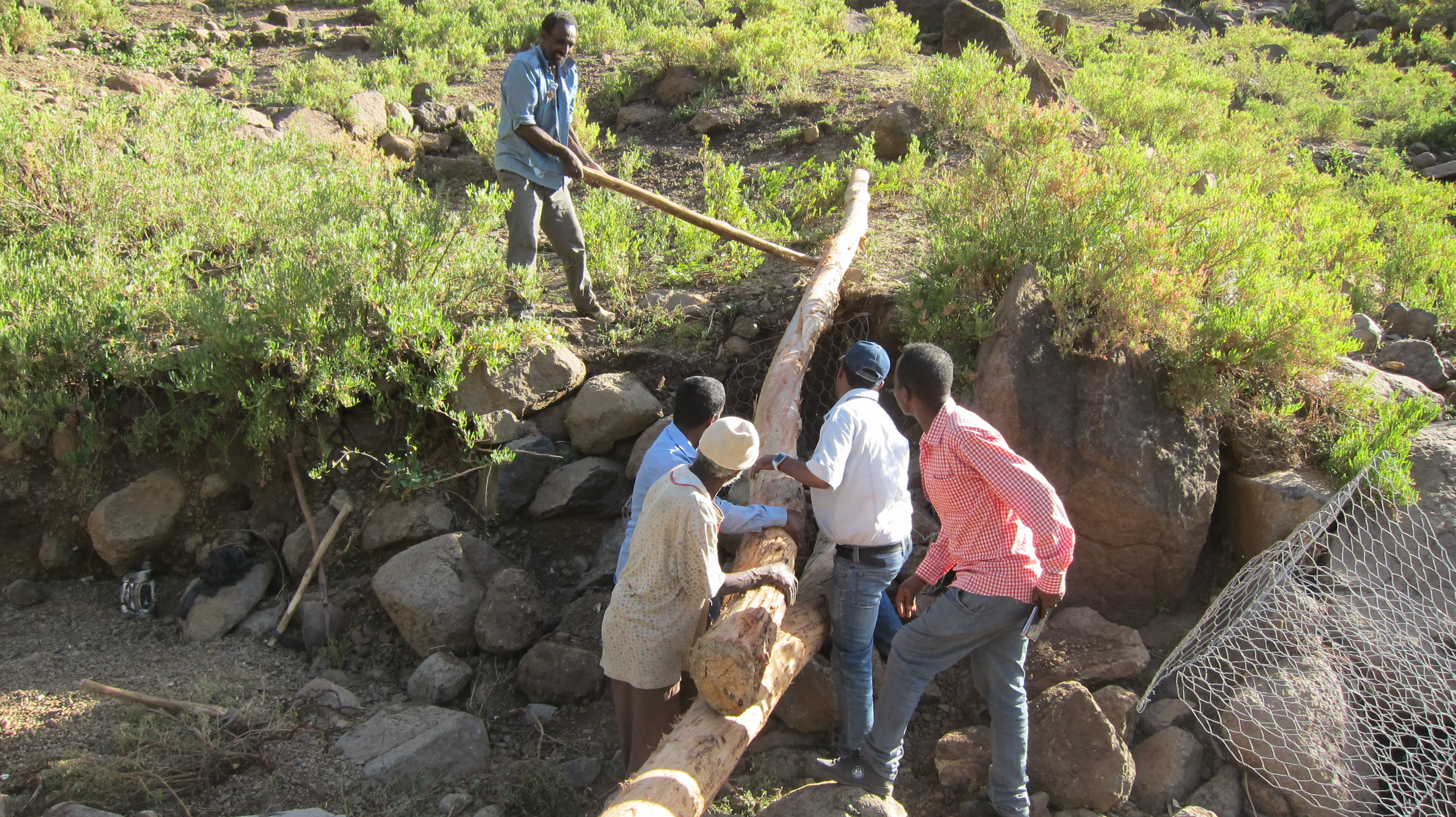
Log dam building in Adawro

=== Size ===
Check dams are usually less than 2 to 3 feet (0.61 to 0.91 m) high. and the center of the dam should be at least 6 in (0.15 m) lower than its edges. This criterion induces a weir effect, resulting in increased water surface level upstream for some, if not all flow conditions.

=== Spacing ===
In order to effectively slow water velocity to reduce erosion and to protect the channel between dams in a larger system, spacing must be designed properly. Check dams should be spaced such that the toe of the upstream check dam is equal to the elevation of the downstream check dam's crest. This allows water to pond between dams and substantially slows the flow's velocity.

=== Effects on Sediment Control ===
While sediment control is often not the explicit main purpose of a check dam, check dams do have a large impact on how sediment moves through a waterway. Check dams are shown to reduce channel gradient upstream, but may not have the same effect downstream. In fact, while the channel gradient upstream may be completely inverted, a check dam acting as a sediment barrier will first form a scour pit at its foot, then cause sediment to accumulate in such a way that channel gradient is increased downstream. Thus, when check dams are implemented in a series, height and spacing of the dams must be optimized to account for both upstream and downstream effects of the check dams. Check dams can also stabilize the sides of a channel, as well as trap an initial amount of sediment that will be retained as long as the dam is operational. Sediment retention by check dams is well documented and varies from site to site as environmental conditions and characteristics change.

== Advantages ==
Check dams are a highly effective practice to reduce flow velocities in channels and waterways. In contrast to big dams, check dams are implemented faster, are cost-effective, and are smaller in scope. Because of this, their implementation does not typically displace people and communities nor do they destroy natural resources if designed correctly. Moreover, the dams are simple to construct and do not rely on advanced technologies, allowing their use in rural communities with fewer resources or access to technical expertise, as they have been in India's drylands for some time now.

== Limitations ==
Check dams still require maintenance and sediment-removal practices. They become more difficult to implement on steep slopes, as water velocity is higher and the distance between dams must be shortened. Check dams, depending on the material used, can have a limited life span but if implemented correctly can be considered permanent.

Check dams can and do fail, either from a structural breach or collapse, or not functioning in the way they were intended to. However, studies suggest that failure events can cause increases in flood discharge, but may not have a significant impact on overall flooding downstream. While check dam failure is not shown to have catastrophic consequences for the most part, some cascading failure instances, particularly in mountainous regions, can lead to loss of life and other destruction, as exemplified by a 1996 flooding event on the Aras River in Spain that killed 87 people, due in part to a cascading check dam system failure. Regular maintenance of check dams can help prevent failure.

== Maintenance ==
Check dams require regular maintenance as typically temporary structures not designed to withstand long-term use. Dams should be inspected every week and after heavy rainfall. It is important that rubble, litter, and leaves are removed from the upstream side of the dam. This is typically done when the sediment has reached a height of one-half the original height of the dam.

When the site is permanently stabilized and the check dam is no longer needed, it is fully removed, including components washed downstream, and bare spots are stabilized.

== See also ==
- Water conservation structures
- Drop structure
- Gabion
- Groyne
- Flexible debris-resisting barrier
