= Abiy Addi =

Place in Tigray Region, Ethiopia

Abiy Addi ዓብዪ ዓዲ
- Town
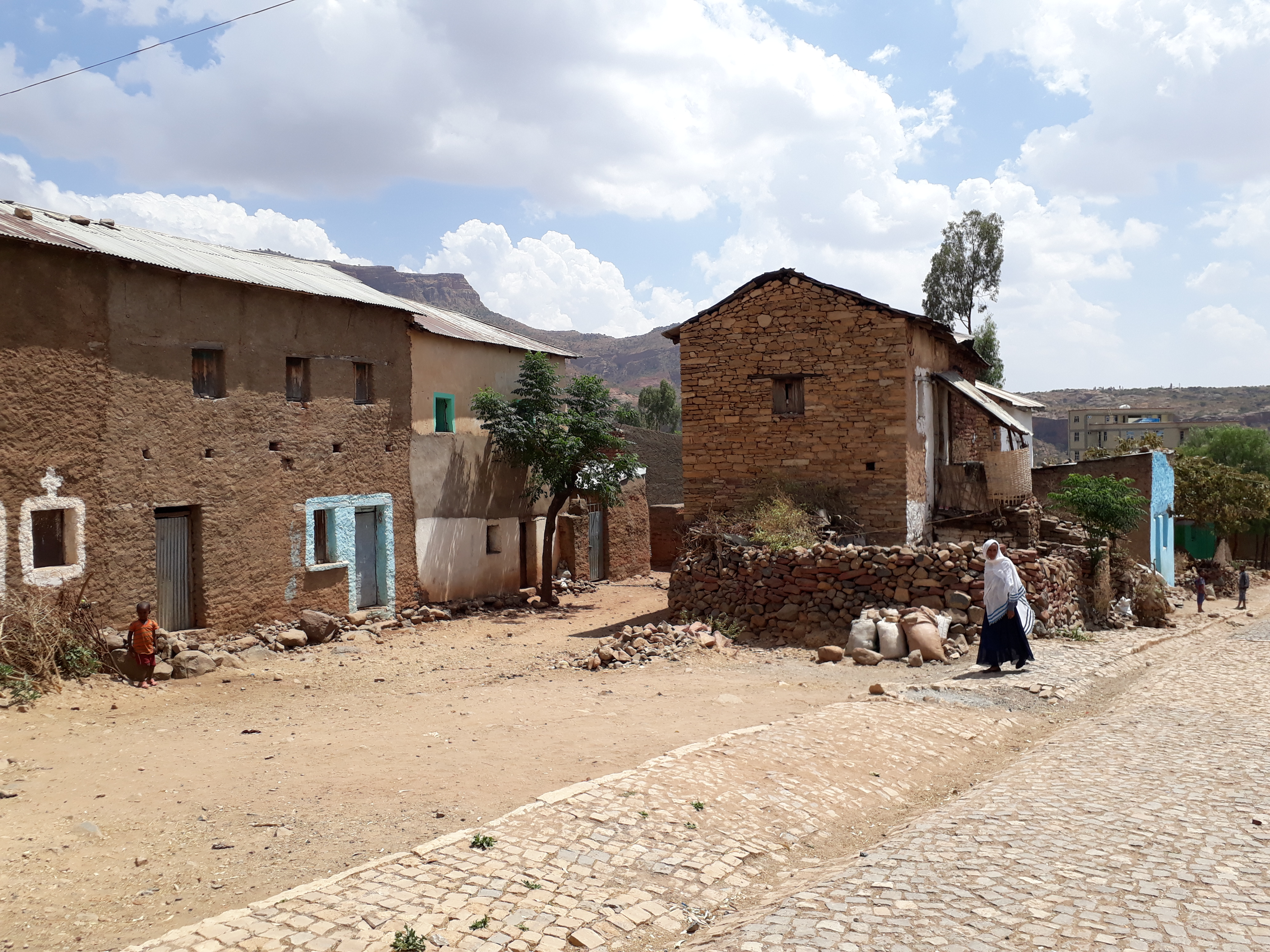
- Older houses in Abiy Addi

- Location within Ethiopia
- Coordinates: 13°37′23″N 39°00′06″E
- Country: Ethiopia
- Region: Tigray
- Zone: Maekelay (Central)
- Elevation: 1,950 m (6,400 ft)

Population (2007)
  - Total: 16,115
  - Estimate (2022): 34,176
- Time zone: UTC+3 (EAT)

Abiy Addi (also spelled Abi Addi; Tigrigna ዓብዪ ዓዲ "Big town") is a town in central Tigray Region, Ethiopia. Abiy Addi is at the southeastern edge of the Kola Tembien woreda, of which it is the capital.

== Overview ==
The town is divided into two parts by the Tanqwa River, the lower part being the more 'respectable' part while the upper part "is where you'll find the marketplace ... and the seedier bars in which you're most likely to see Awri dancing as the tej hits the mark." Briggs notes that Abiy Addi is known in Tigray for the frenetic style of dancing called "Awri", as well as the quality of its honey.

Having visited Abiy Abbi in the mid-1940s, David Buxton thought that "perhaps the best thing about Abbi Addi was the panorama of the Simien mountains standing to the west beyond the deep valley of the Tekezé." Buxton notes that the entire height of that mountain range was visible, from the southern foothills to the summit. "And round about the lower slopes, dimly seen through the haze, were many fantastic outlying peaks, square or spiky, like the mountains of a child's imagination." As for the town itself, Philip Briggs describes it as "a reasonably substantial settlement, set in a dusty valley below an impressive cliff."

Abiy Addi is connected to Mekelle to the east in 90 km and Adwa to the north-northwest in 90 km by asphalt roads.

== History ==
Abiy Addi owed its importance in the 19th century due to its location on the "King's Road", at the point where the road south from Adwa split, one branch taking travellers to Debre Tabor and the other to the Lake Ashenge region. The British explorer Charles Beke passed through this town (which he called "A'biyad") 15 April 1843, and described it later as "the principal place of Tembien, and a large market-town." However, in later years the fortunes of the town varied. By 1890, visitors described Abiy Addi as a small market town which handled various imported goods, such as mirrors made in France, cotton cloth from Manchester and Mumbai, as well as the usual local produce. Writing a few years later, Augustus B. Wylde described the Abiy Addi market, held on Saturdays, as of medium size.

On 5 December 1935, during the Second Italo-Ethiopian War, Abiy Addi was occupied by the Italian Eritrean Corps. the town was evacuated later that month. Then, after having been headquarters of Ras Kassa Haile Darge and Ras Seyoum Mengesha, it was definitely reoccupied by the Italians on 28 February 1936. A rock-hewn church served as the shelter of Ras Kassa. Subsequently, many inhabitants deserted the town partly to engage in guerilla fighting lower in the Tekezé Valley.

In 1938, there were shops and restaurants in Abiy Addi, a telephone and telegraph office, a health post and a school. There was also an important market. At May Lomin, there were gardens with bananas, coffee and lemons.

The Derg attacked the town twice in 1988, once with helicopters, killing and wounding 48 people.

== Demographics ==
In 1867, Abiy Addi was described as a "Mahomedan place" with, on market days, "about 2,000 people assembled in the market place". In 1938, the town counted approximately 20,000 inhabitants (which was very large for that time).

Based on the 2007 national census conducted by the Central Statistical Agency of Ethiopia (CSA), this town has a total population of 16,115, of whom 7,826 are men and 8,289 women. The majority of the inhabitants said they practiced Ethiopian Orthodox Christianity, with 88.59% reporting that as their religion, while 11.31% of the population were Muslim. The 1994 census reported it had a total population of 7,884 of whom 3,545 were men and 4,339 were women.

== Geology ==
Abiy Addi has an elevation ranging from 1917 to 2275 meters above sea level. From the higher to the lower locations, the following geological formations are present: Ashangi Basalts, Amba Aradam Formation, Adigrat Sandstone, and Edaga Arbi Glacials.

== Tourism ==
Its mountainous nature and proximity to Mekelle makes Abiy Addi fit for tourism. The high variability of geological formations and the rugged topography invite for geological and geographic tourism or "geotourism". Geosites in the tabia include:

- Geramba Sillasie, rock-hewn church
- Chege forest
- May Lomin gorge and springs
- Arefa, reputedly birthplace of the Queen of Sheba

== See also ==
- History of Tembien
- First Battle of Tembien
- Second Battle of Tembien
