= Soil in Tanqwa Abergele =

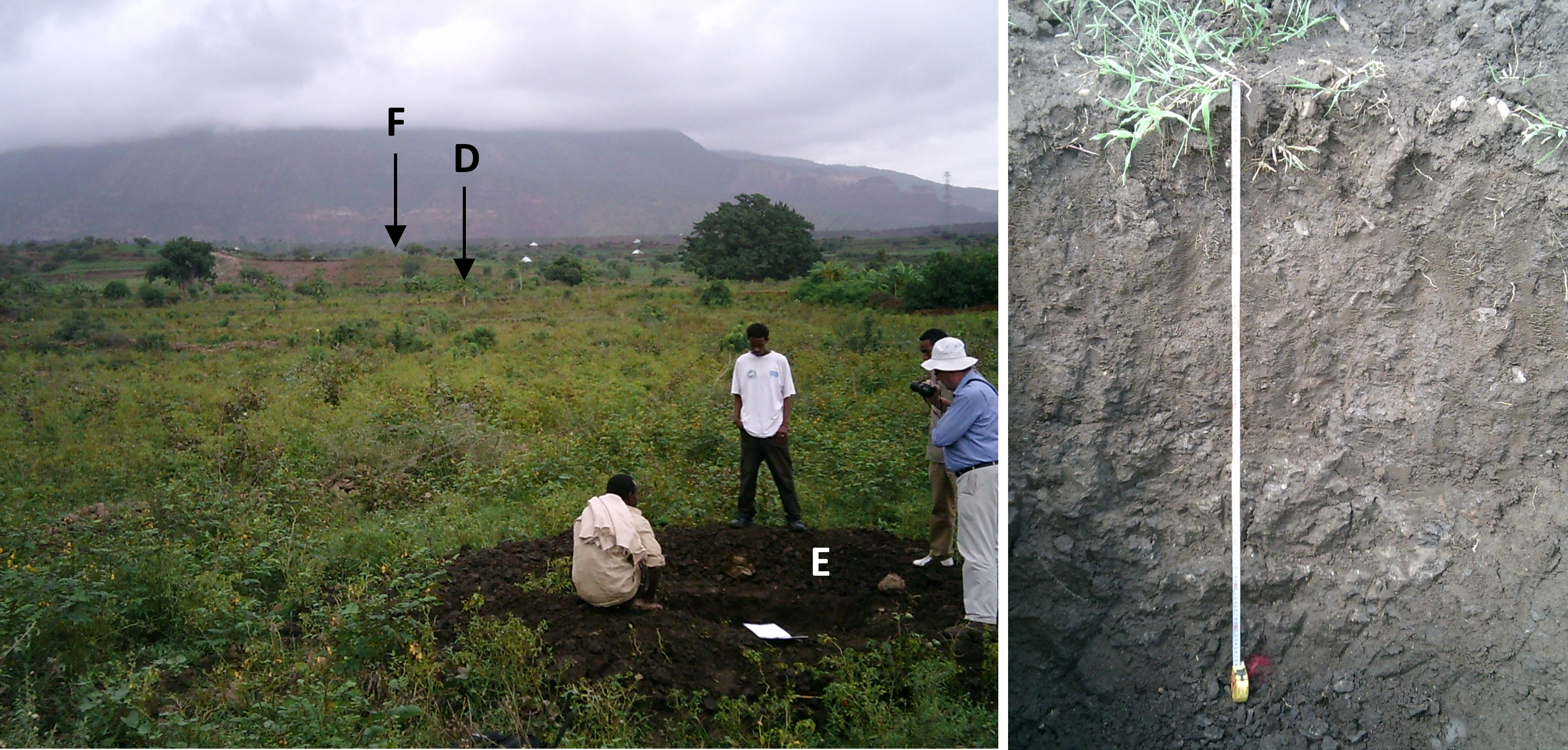
Chromic Vertisol in Agbe (D is location of Colluvic Calcic Luvisol F Lithic Leptosol)

The soils of the Tanqwa Abergele woreda (district) in Tigray (Ethiopia) reflect its longstanding agricultural history, highly seasonal rainfall regime, relatively high temperatures, overall dominance of Precambrian metamorphic rocks and steep slopes.

== Factors contributing to soil diversity ==
=== Climate ===
Annual rainfall depth is very variable with an average of around 600–800 mm. Most rains fall during the main rainy season, which typically extends from June to September. Mean temperature in woreda town Yechila is 25.4 °C, oscillating between average daily minimum of 14.6 °C and maximum of 35.6 °C. The contrasts between day and night air temperatures are much larger than seasonal contrasts.

=== Geology ===
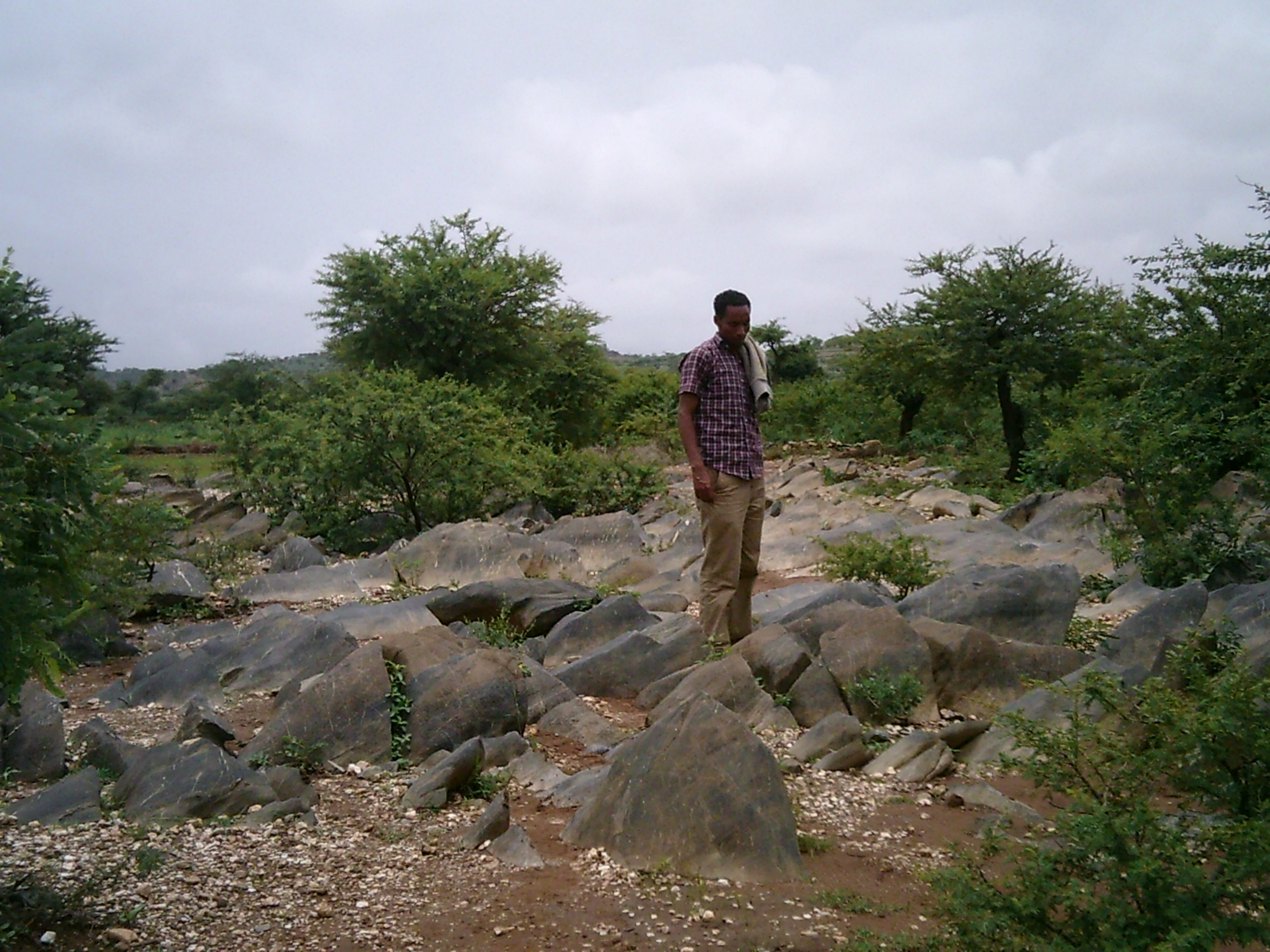
Black meta-limestone outcropping near Taget

From the higher to the lower locations, the following geological formations are present:

- Adigrat Sandstone
- Edaga Arbi Glacials
- Precambrian metamorphic rocks
- Quaternary alluvium and freshwater tufa

=== Topography ===
As part of the Ethiopian Highlands the land has undergone a rapid tectonic uplift, leading the occurrence of mountain peaks, plateaus, valleys and gorges.

=== Land use ===
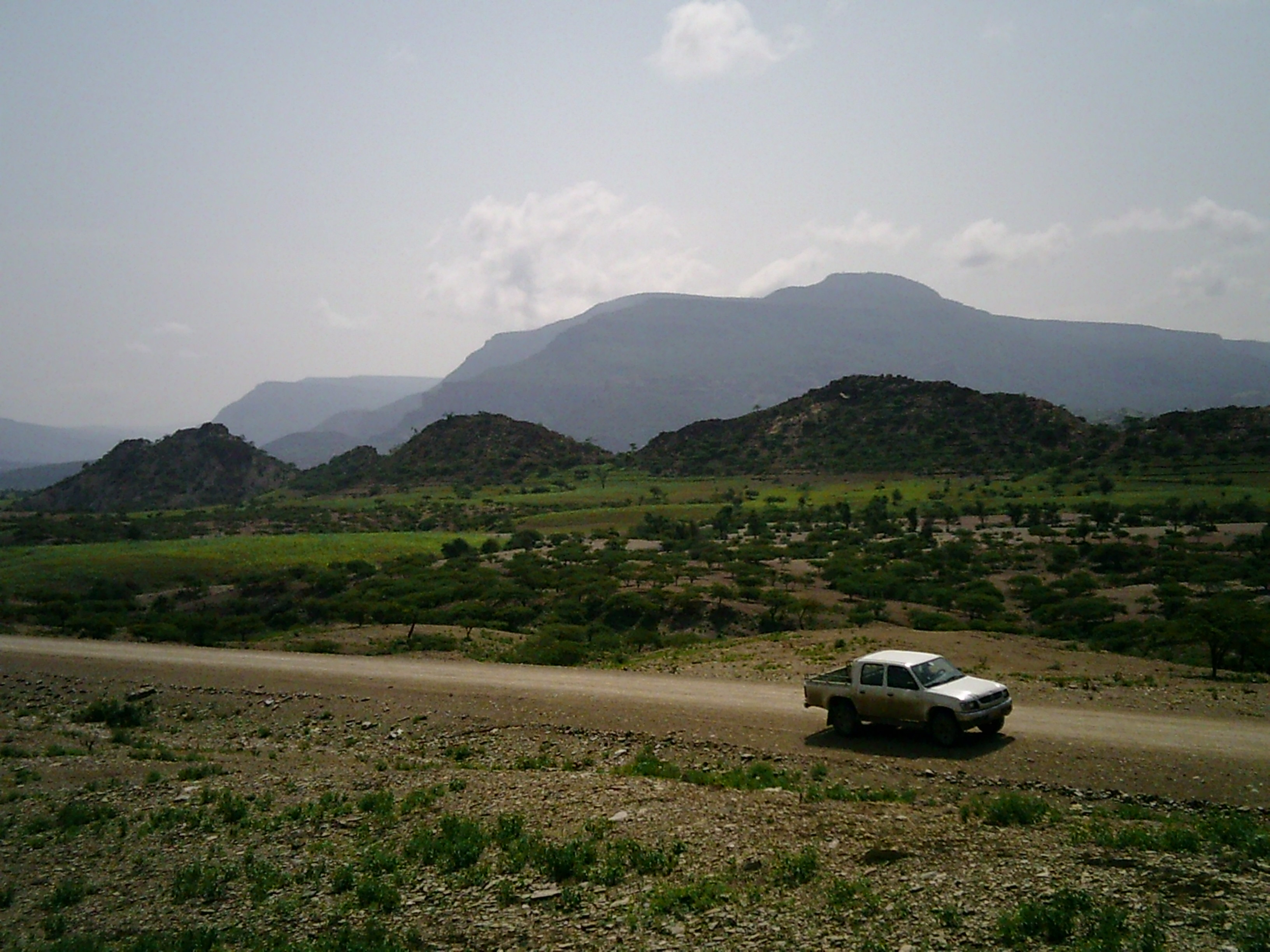
Meta limestone hills at Sho'ate Hegum

Generally speaking the level lands and intermediate slopes are occupied by cropland, while there is rangeland and shrubs on the steeper slopes. Remnant forests occur around Orthodox Christian churches and a few inaccessible places. A recent trend is the widespread planting of eucalyptus trees.

=== Environmental changes ===
Soil degradation in this district became important when humans started deforestation almost 5000 years ago. Depending on land use history, locations have been exposed in varying degrees to such land degradation.

== Geomorphic regions and soil units ==
Given the complex geology and topography of the district, it has been organised into land systems - areas with specific and unique geomorphic and geological characteristics, characterised by a particular soil distribution along the soil catena. Soil types are classified in line with World Reference Base for Soil Resources and reference made to main characteristics that can be observed in the field.

=== Adigrat Sandstone cliff and footslope ===
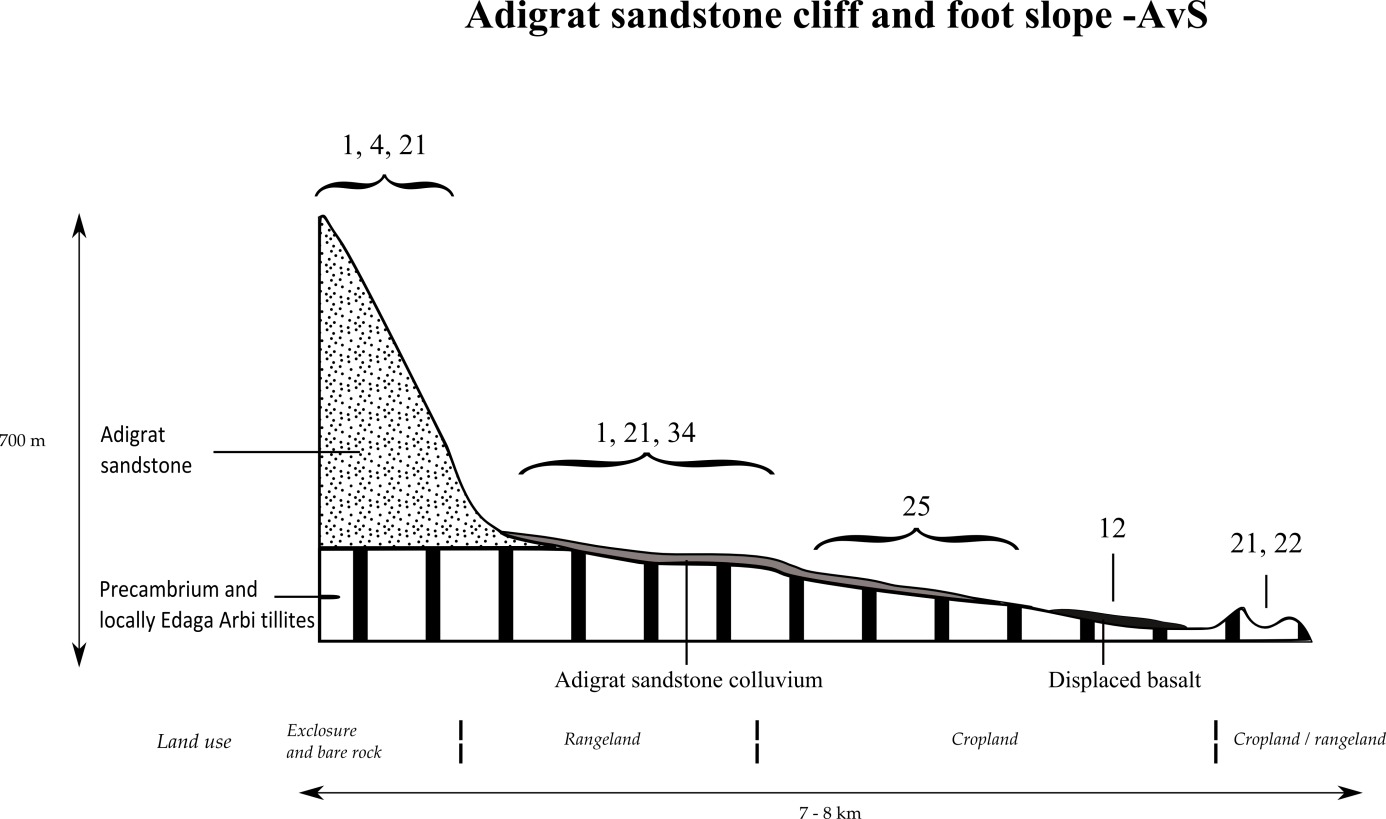
Typical catena on the Adigrat Sandstone cliff and footslope in and near Abergele

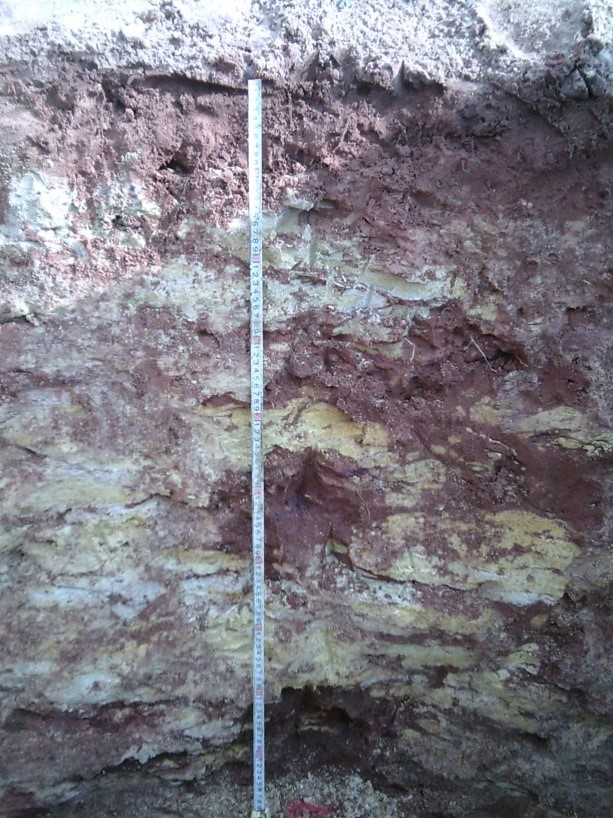
Lithic Leptosol profile

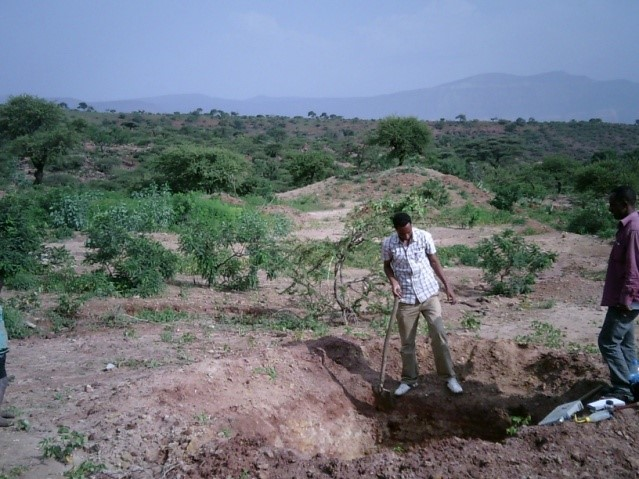
Lithic Leptosol in Agbe

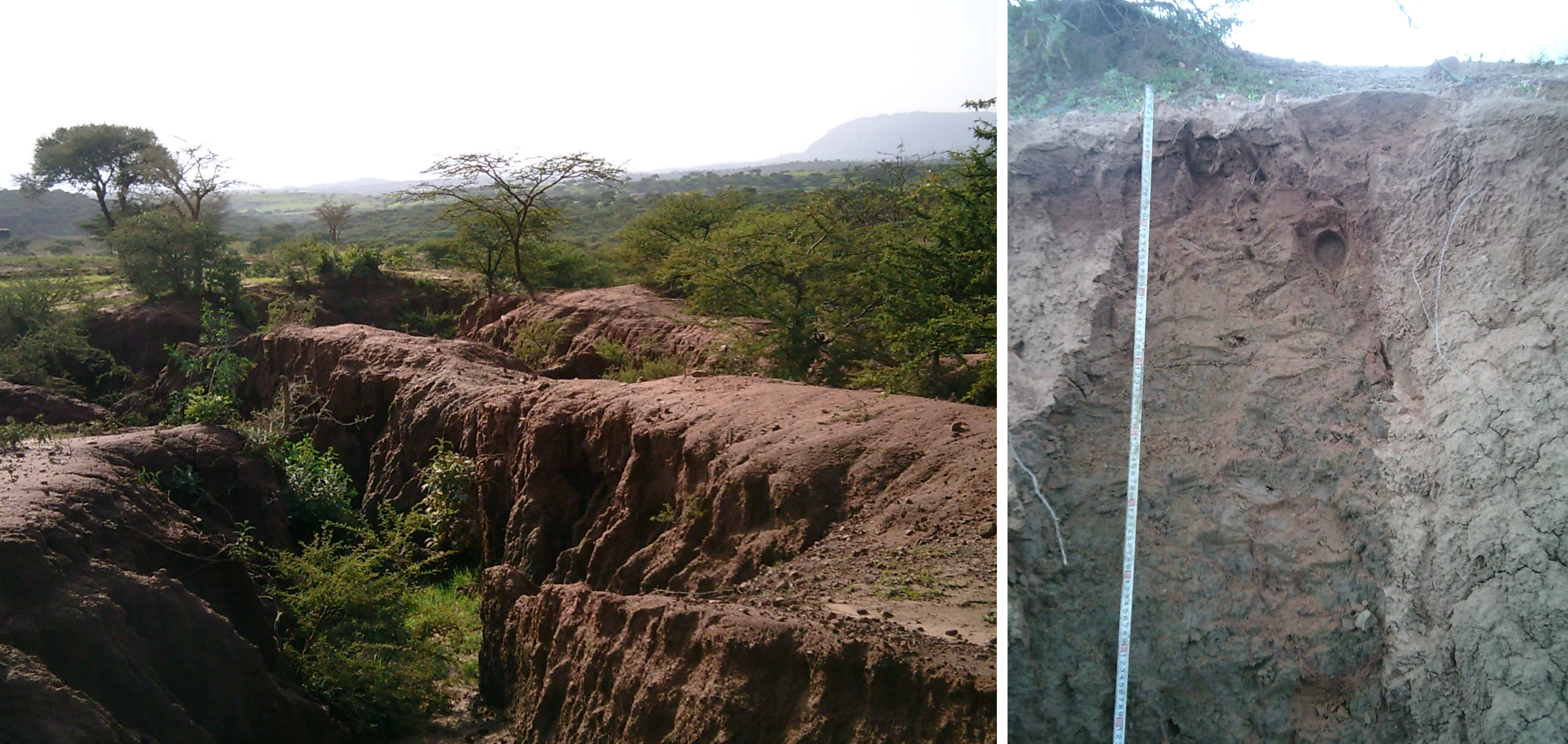
Haplic Planosol along the road to Abiy Addi

- Associated soil types
  - complex of rock outcrops, very stony and very shallow soils ((Lithic) Leptosol) (1)
  - shallow, stony sandy [[loam soils (Eutric Regosol and Cambisol) (21)
- Inclusions
  - shallow, dry soils with very high amounts of stones (Leptic and Skeletic Cambisol and Regosol) (4)
  - deep, dark cracking clays with good fertility, but problems of waterlogging (Chromic and Pellic Vertisol) (12)
  - soils with stagnating water due to an abrupt textural change such as sand over clay (Haplic Planosol]]) (34)

=== Alluvial plain of Giba River in Abergele ===
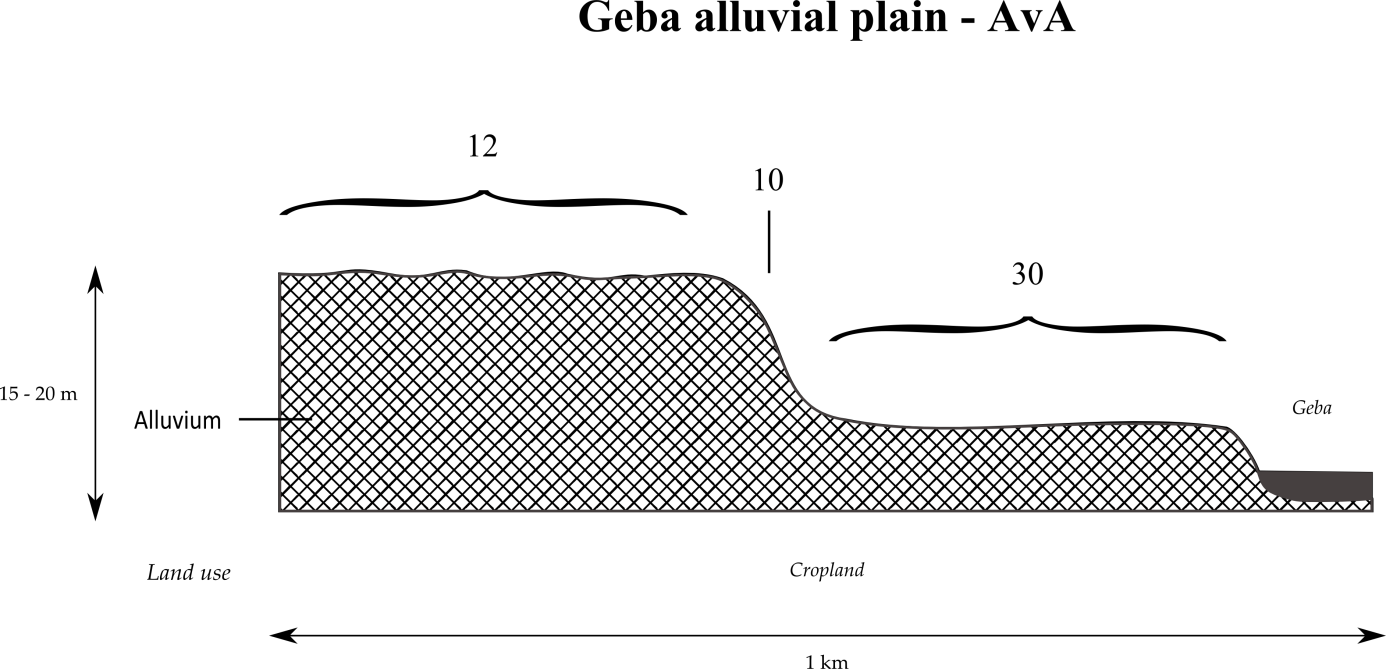
Typical catena in the alluvial plain of Giba River in Abergele

- Associated soil types
  - deep dark cracking clays with very good natural fertility, waterlogged during the wet season (Chromic Vertisol, Pellic Vertisol) (12)
  - brown loamy sands developed on alluvium along Giba River (Fluvisol) (30)
- Inclusion: stony, dark cracking clays with good natural fertility (Vertic Cambisol) (10)

=== Gallery: soils in Tanqwa Abergele ===
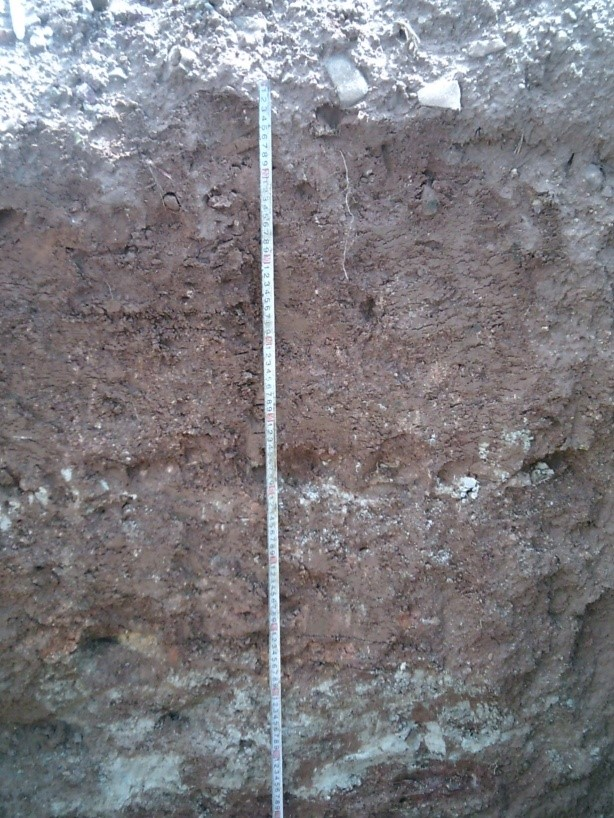
Colluvic Calcic Luvisol profile

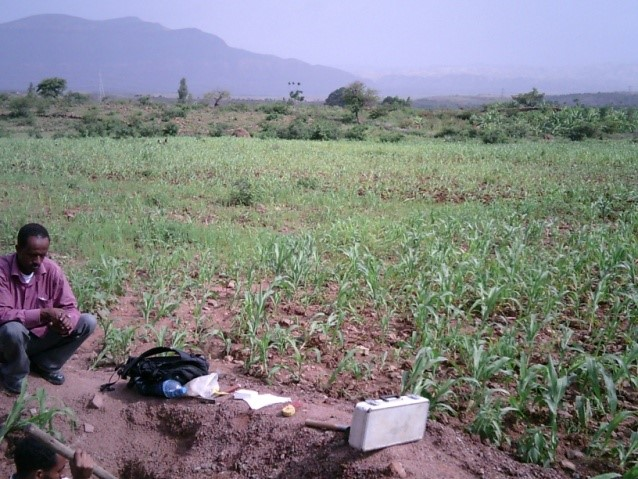
Colluvic Calcic Luvisol in Agbe

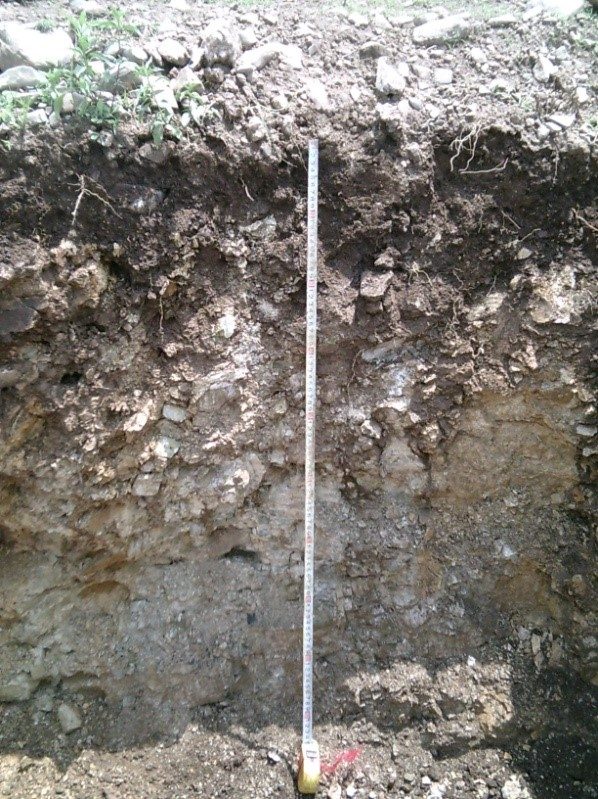
Calcaric Rendzic Leptosol profile

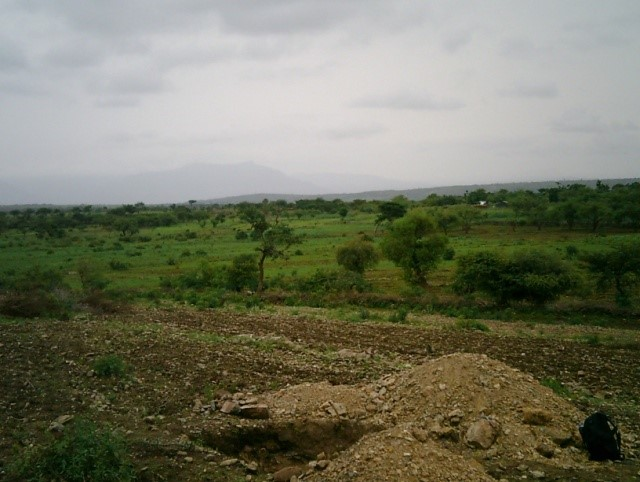
Calcaric Rendzic Leptosol in Taget

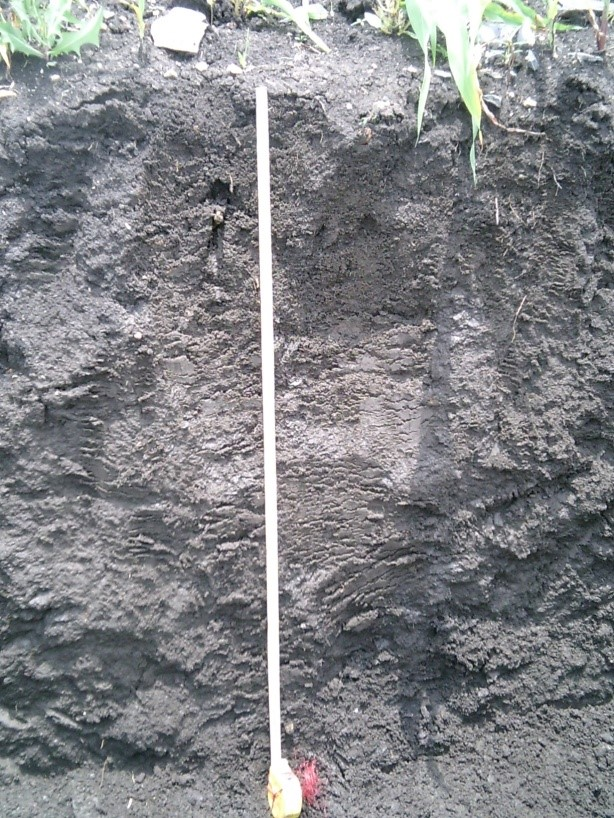
Pellic Vertisol profile

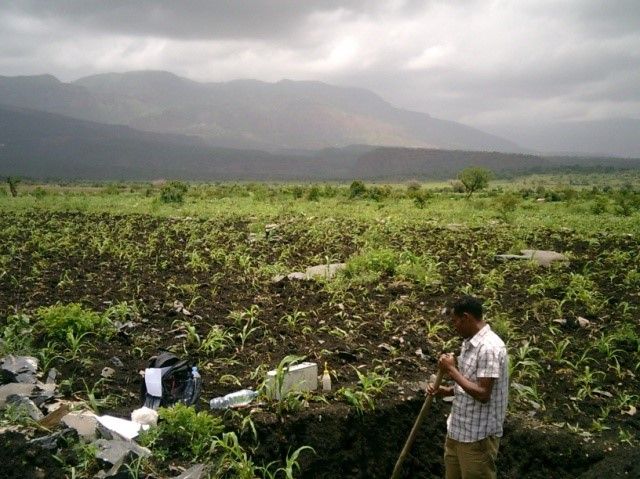
Pellic Vertisol in Taget

=== Catena on metamorphic limestone in Abergele ===
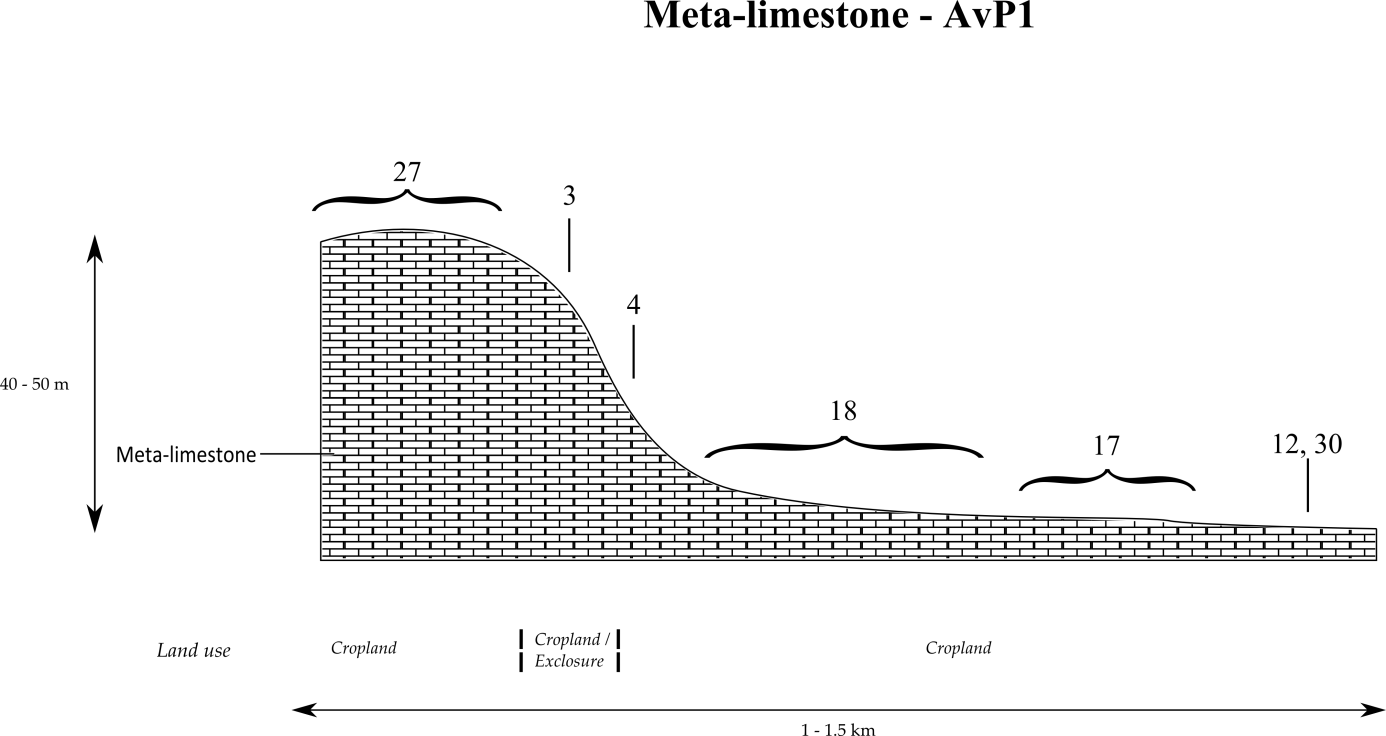
Metamorphic limestone catena in Abergele

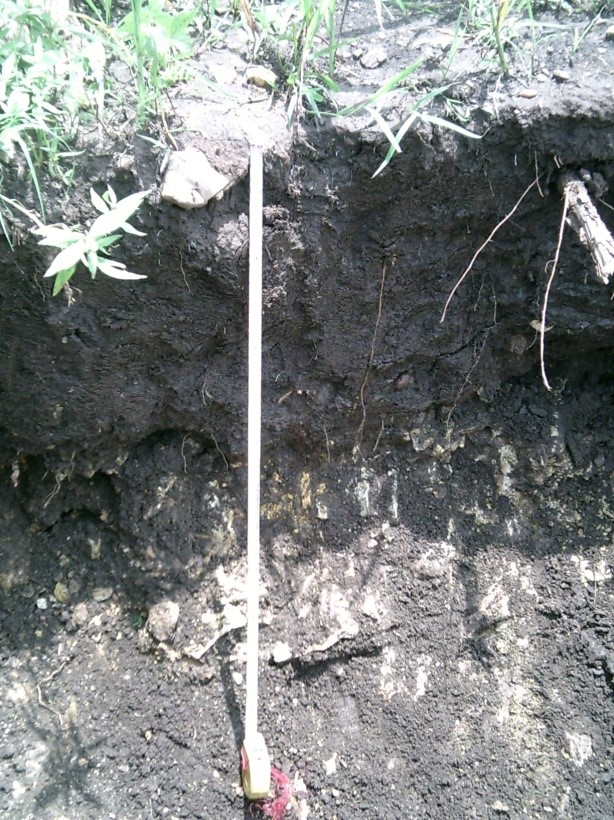
Epileptic Protovertic Cambisol profile

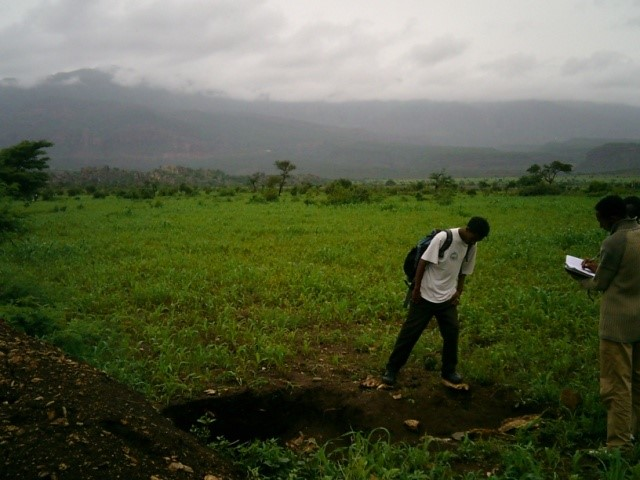
Epileptic Protovertic Cambisol in Taget

- Associated soil types
  - moderately deep, stony, dark cracking clays on calcaric material (Calcaric Vertic Cambisol) (17)
  - shallow, stony, dark clay loamy soils (Epileptic Protovertic Cambisol) (18)
  - imperfectly to poorly drained, shallow to very shallow, dark soils developed on calcaric material with a moderate natural fertility (Vertic Endoleptic Calcisol) (27)
- Inclusions
  - shallow, stony, dark, loamy soils on calcaric material (Rendzic Leptosol) (3)
  - shallow, very stony, silt loamy to loamy soils (Skeletic Cambisol, Leptic Cambisol, Skeletic Regosol) (4)
  - deep dark cracking clays with very good natural fertility, waterlogged during the wet season (Chromic Vertisol, Pellic Vertisol) (12)
  - Brown to dark, silty clay loams to loamy sands developed on alluvium, with good natural fertility (Fluvisol) (30)

=== Catena on metamorphic sedimentary rock in Abergele ===
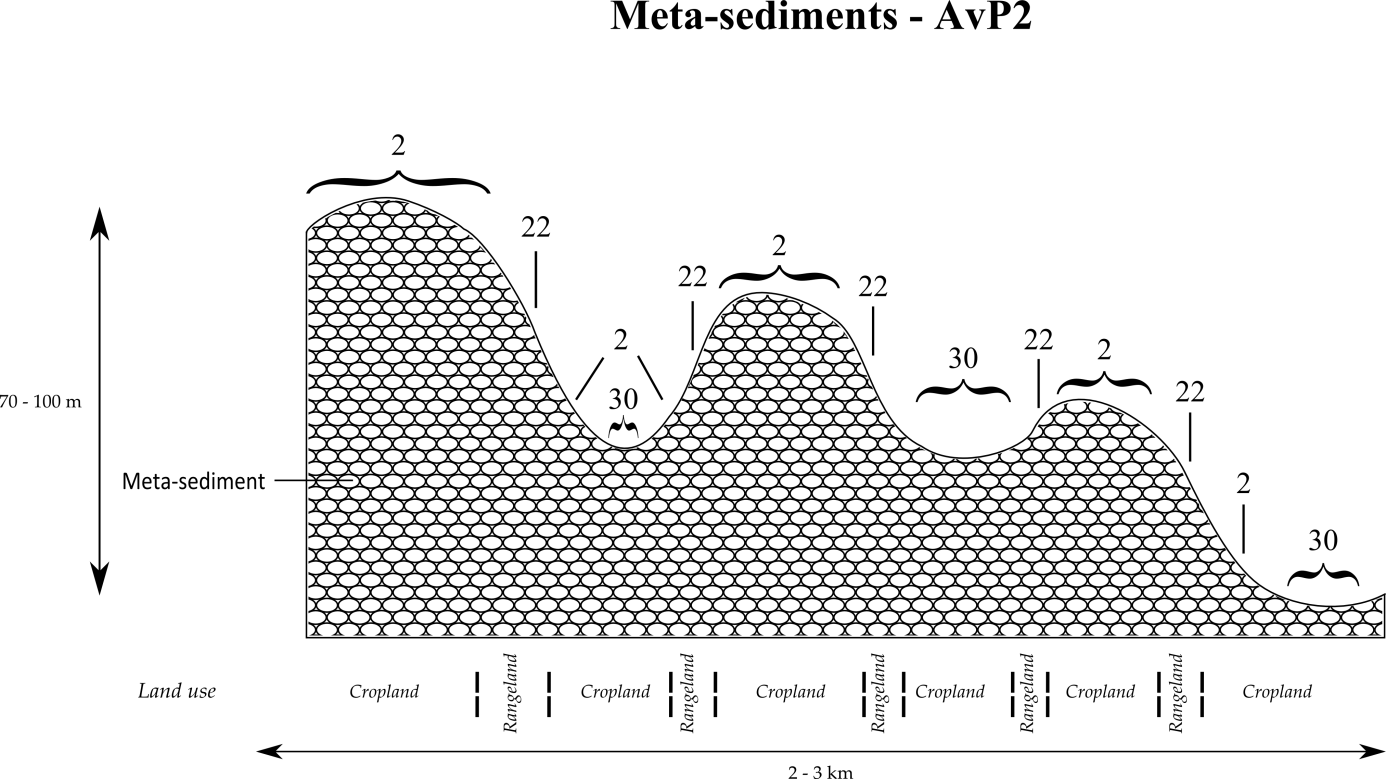
Metamorphic sedimentary rock catena in Abergele

- Associated soil types
  - Rock outcrops and very shallow soils on limestone (Calcaric Leptosol) (2)
  - Shallow stony dark loams on calcaric material (Calcaric Regosol, Calcaric Cambisol) (22)
- Inclusions
  - Brown to dark, silty clay loams to loamy sands developed on alluvium, with good natural fertility (Fluvisol) (30)

=== Severely incised granite near Giba mouth ===
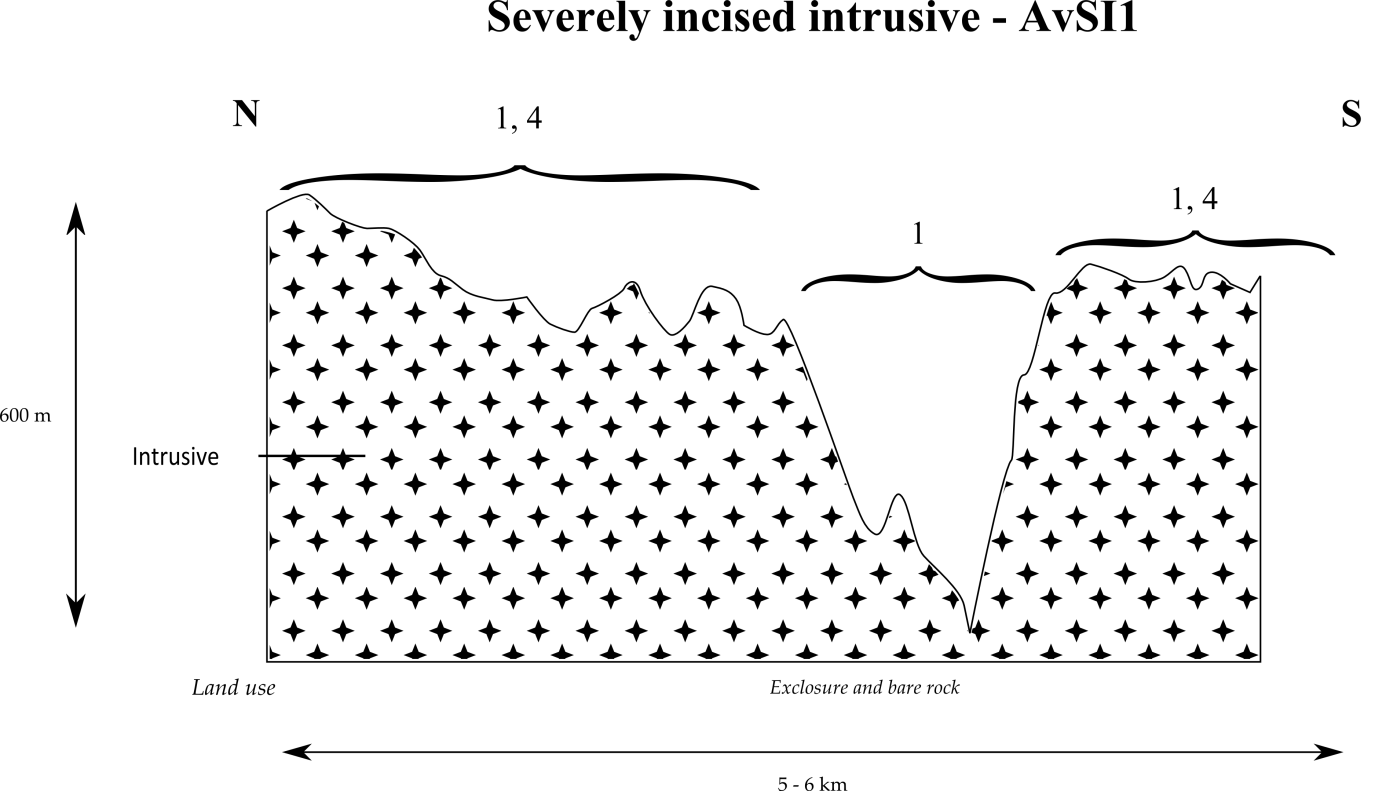
Typical catena on severely incised granite near Giba mouth

- Dominant soil type: rock outcrops and very shallow soils (Lithic Leptosol) (1)
- Associated soil type: shallow, very stony, silt loamy to loamy soils (Skeletic Cambisol, Leptic Cambisol, Skeletic Regosol) (4)

=== Severely incised metamorphic sedimentary rock ===
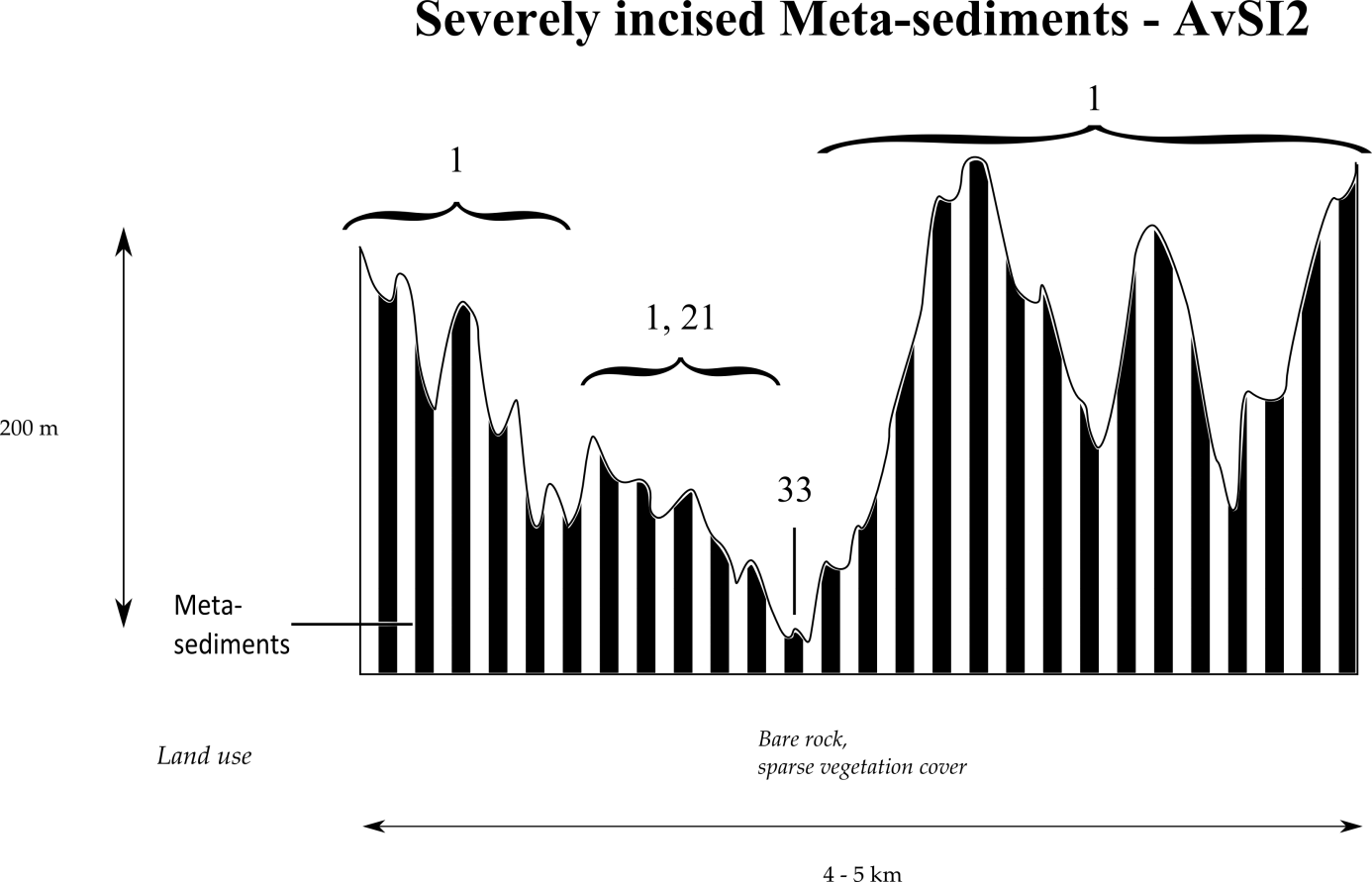
Severely incised metamorphic sedimentary rock in Abergele

- Dominant soil type: rock outcrops and very shallow soils (Lithic Leptosol) (1)
- Associated soil type: shallow, stony loam soils (Eutric Regosol and Cambisol) (21)
- Inclusion: clays of floodplains with very high watertable with moderate to good natural fertility (Eutric Gleysol, Gleyic Cambisol) (33)

=== Metamorphic volcanic rock in Abergele ===
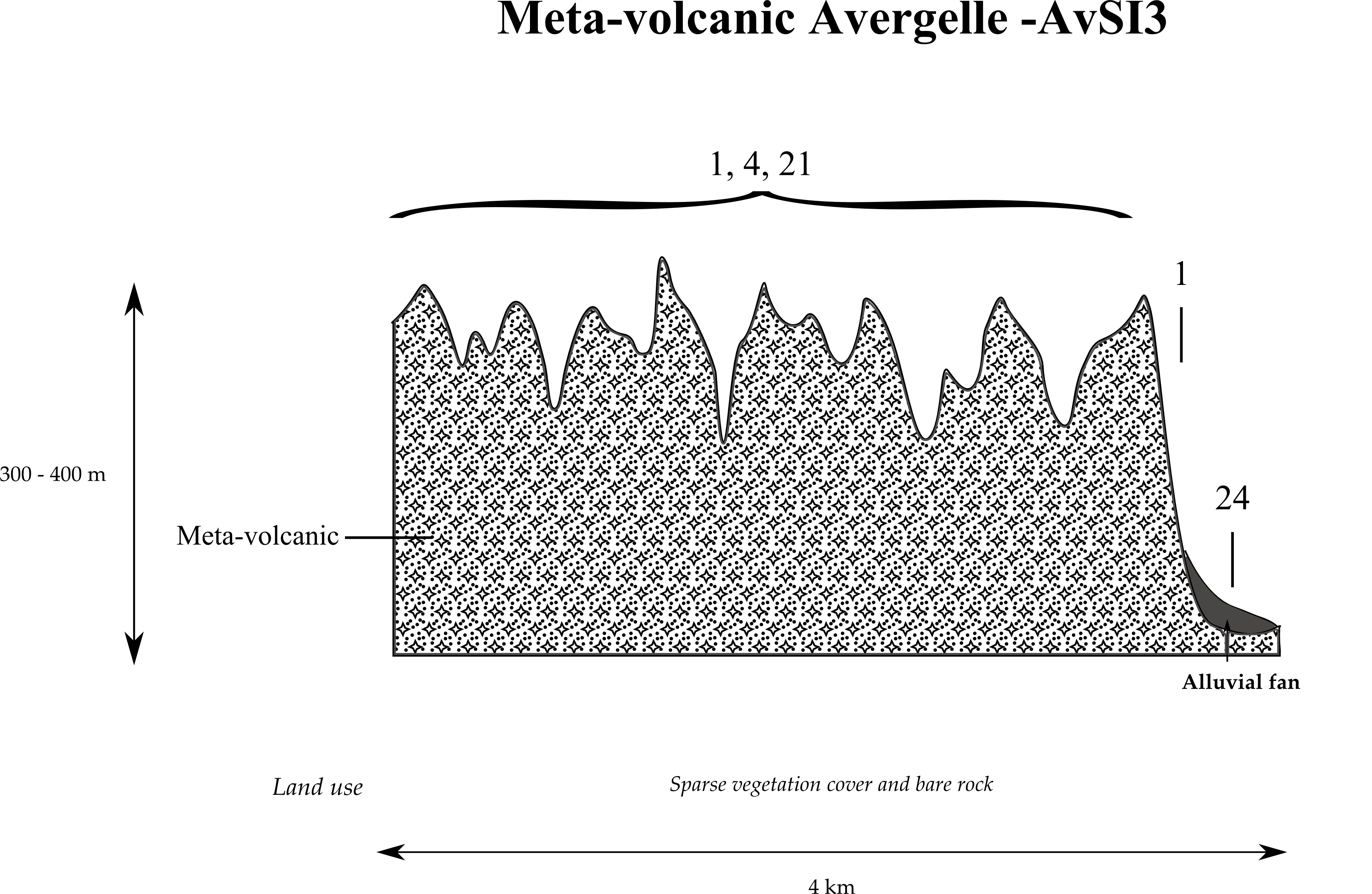
Typical catena on metamorphic volcanic rock in Abergele

- Dominant soil type: rock outcrops and very shallow soils (Lithic Leptosol) (1)
- Associated soil types
  - shallow, very stony, silt loamy to loamy soils (Skeletic Cambisol, Leptic Cambisol, Skeletic Regosol) (4)
  - shallow, stony loam soils (Eutric Regosol and Cambisol) (21)
- Inclusion: sandy clay loams to sands developed on sandy colluvium (Eutric Arenosol, Regosol, Cambisol) (24)
