= Menachek =

Municipality in Ethiopia

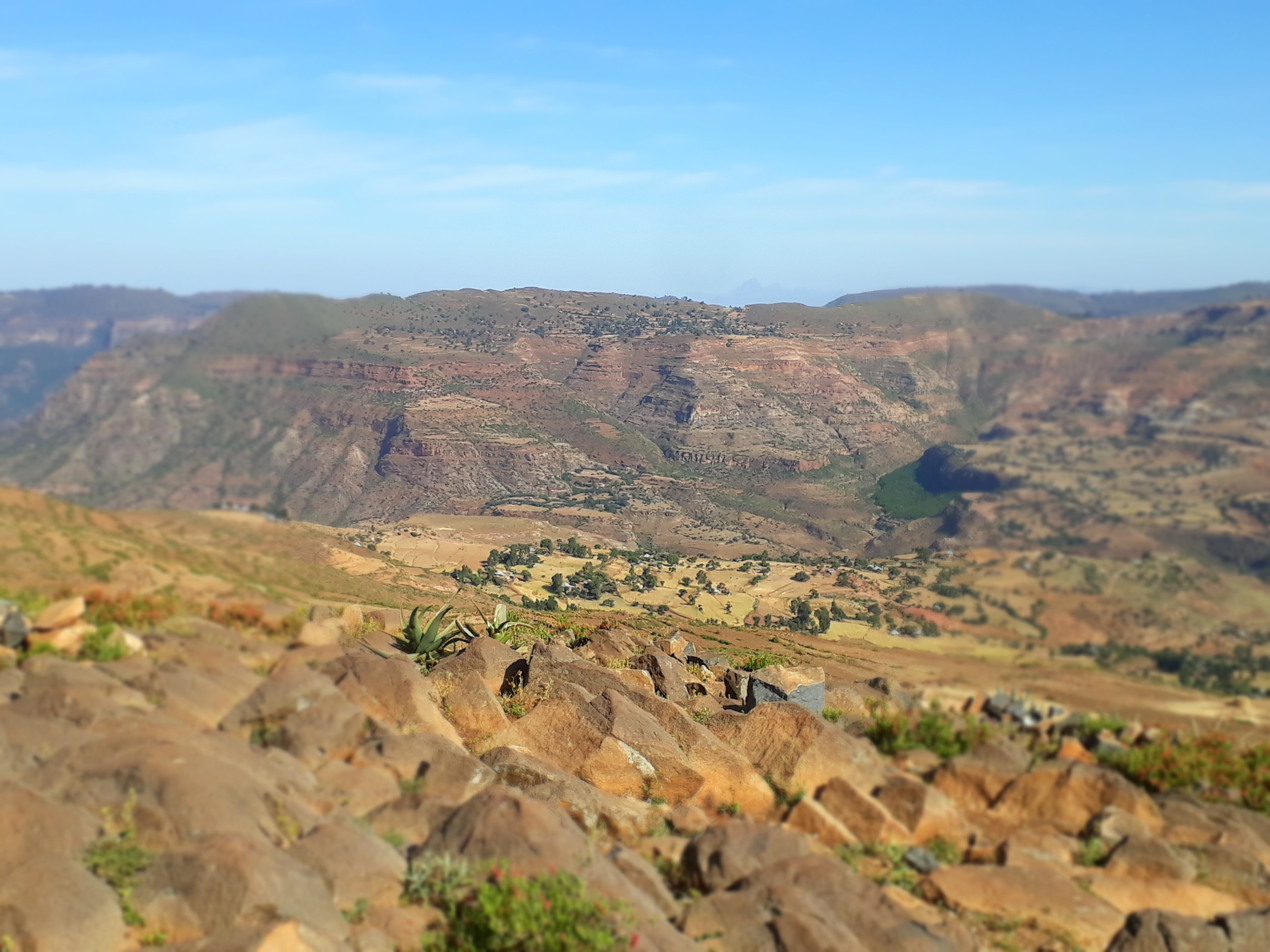

- Location within Ethiopia
- Coordinates: 13°35′N 39°5′E
- Country: Ethiopia
- Region: Tigray
- Zone: Debub Misraqawi (Southeastern)
- Woreda: Dogu'a Tembien

Area
  - Total: 16.32 km^{2} (6.30 sq mi)
- Elevation: 2,580 m (8,460 ft)
- Time zone: UTC+3 (EAT)

Menachek is a tabia or municipality in the Tanqua Millash district of the Tigray Region of Ethiopia. The tabia centre is in Addi Bayro village (also called "Debre Birhan"). Until January 2020 it belonged to the Dogu'a Tembien district.

== Geography ==
The tabia occupies the flanks of the valley of the Tsech'i River that drains Dogu'a Tembien to the west. The highest peak is near Welekhlekha (almost 2700 m a.s.l.) and the lowest place in the lower Tsech'i gorge (1920 m a.s.l.).

=== Geology ===
From the higher to the lower locations, the following geological formations are present:

- Upper basalt
- Interbedded lacustrine deposits
- Lower basalt
- Amba Aradam Formation
- Adigrat Sandstone

=== Geomorphology and soils ===
The main geomorphic units, with corresponding soil types are:

- Hagere Selam Highlands, along the central basalt and sandstone ridge
  - Associated soil types
    - shallow soils with high stone contents (Skeletic Cambisol, Leptic Cambisol, Skeletic Regosol)
    - moderately deep dark stony clays with good natural fertility (Vertic Cambisol)
    - deep, dark cracking clays, temporarily waterlogged during the wet season (Pellic Vertisol)
  - Inclusions
    - Rock outcrops and very shallow soils (Lithic Leptosol)
    - Rock outcrops and very shallow soils on limestone (Calcaric Leptosol)
    - Deep dark cracking clays with very good natural fertility, waterlogged during the wet season (Chromic Vertisol, Pellic Vertisol)
    - Shallow stony dark loams on calcaric material (Calcaric Regosol, Calcaric Cambisol)
    - Brown loamy soils on basalt with good natural fertility (Luvisol)
- Adigrat Sandstone cliff and footslope
  - Associated soil types
    - complex of rock outcrops, very stony and very shallow soils ((Lithic) Leptosol)
    - shallow, stony sandy [[loam soils (Eutric Regosol and Cambisol)
  - Inclusions
    - shallow, dry soils with very high amounts of stones (Leptic and Skeletic Cambisol and Regosol)
    - deep, dark cracking clays with good fertility, but problems of waterlogging (Chromic and Pellic Vertisol)
    - soils with stagnating water due to an abrupt textural change such as sand over clay (Haplic Planosol]])

=== Climate ===
The rainfall pattern shows a very high seasonality with 70 to 80% of the annual rain falling in July and August. Mean temperature in xxx is 17.4 °C, oscillating between average daily minimum of 9.6 °C and maximum of 24.8 °C. The contrasts between day and night air temperatures are much larger than seasonal contrasts.

=== Springs ===
As there are no permanent rivers, the presence of springs is of utmost importance for the local people. The main springs in the tabia are:

- May Gfay
- May Tsechi
- Gigbana

=== Reservoirs ===
In this area with rains that last only for a couple of months per year, reservoirs of different sizes allow harvesting runoff from the rainy season for further use in the dry season.

- Traditional surface water harvesting ponds, particularly in places without permanent springs, called rahaya
- Horoyo, household ponds, recently constructed through campaigns

=== Settlements ===
The tabia centre Addi Bayro holds a few administrative offices, a health post, a primary school, and some small shops. There are a few more primary schools across the tabia. The main other populated places are:

- Welekhlekha
- Tsech'i
- Gulha

== Agriculture and livelihood ==
The population lives essentially from crop farming, supplemented with off-season work in nearby towns. The land is dominated by farmlands which are clearly demarcated and are cropped every year. Hence the agricultural system is a permanent upland farming system. The farmers have adapted their cropping systems to the spatio-temporal variability in rainfall. An elongated rugged landscape extends to the west of the tabia, which is used for transhumance.

== History and culture ==
=== Caves and archaeological sites ===
The Danei Kawlos cave in the Tsech'i gorge at the west of Menachek at an elevation of about 2020 metres, is some 13.5 metres long (13.621862°N 39.033077°E). It contains lithic tools, potsherds, and faunal remains of Pastoral Neolithic age. Further down, the May Ila open-air site in the Tsech'i gorge at the extreme west of Menachek at a height of about 1990 metres (13.609826°N 39.028260°E) contains blades, blade cores, and a few potsherds of Pastoral Neolithic age.

=== History ===
The history of the tabia is strongly confounded with the history of Tembien.

=== Religion and churches ===
Most inhabitants are Orthodox Christians. The Gulha Maryam church with its large forest is located in the tabia.

=== Inda Siwa, the local beer houses ===
In the main villages, there are traditional beer houses (Inda Siwa).

== Roads and communication ==
The main road Mekelle – Hagere Selam – Abiy Addi runs 2 to 5 km south and east of the tabia. There are regular bus services to these towns. Further, a rural access road links Addi Bayro and Welekhlekha to the main asphalt road.

== Tourism ==
Its mountainous nature and proximity to Mekelle makes the tabia fit for tourism. The high variability of geological formations and the rugged topography invites for geological and geographic tourism or "geotourism". Trekking routes 7 and 19 pass along the southern ridge in this tabia. The tracks are not marked on the ground but can be followed using downloaded .GPX files. They link Inda Maryam Qorar to Debre Sema'it rock church. Facilities in Menachek are very basic.

== See also ==
- Dogu'a Tembien district.
