= Aregen =

Municipality in Tigray Region, Ethiopia

- Municipality
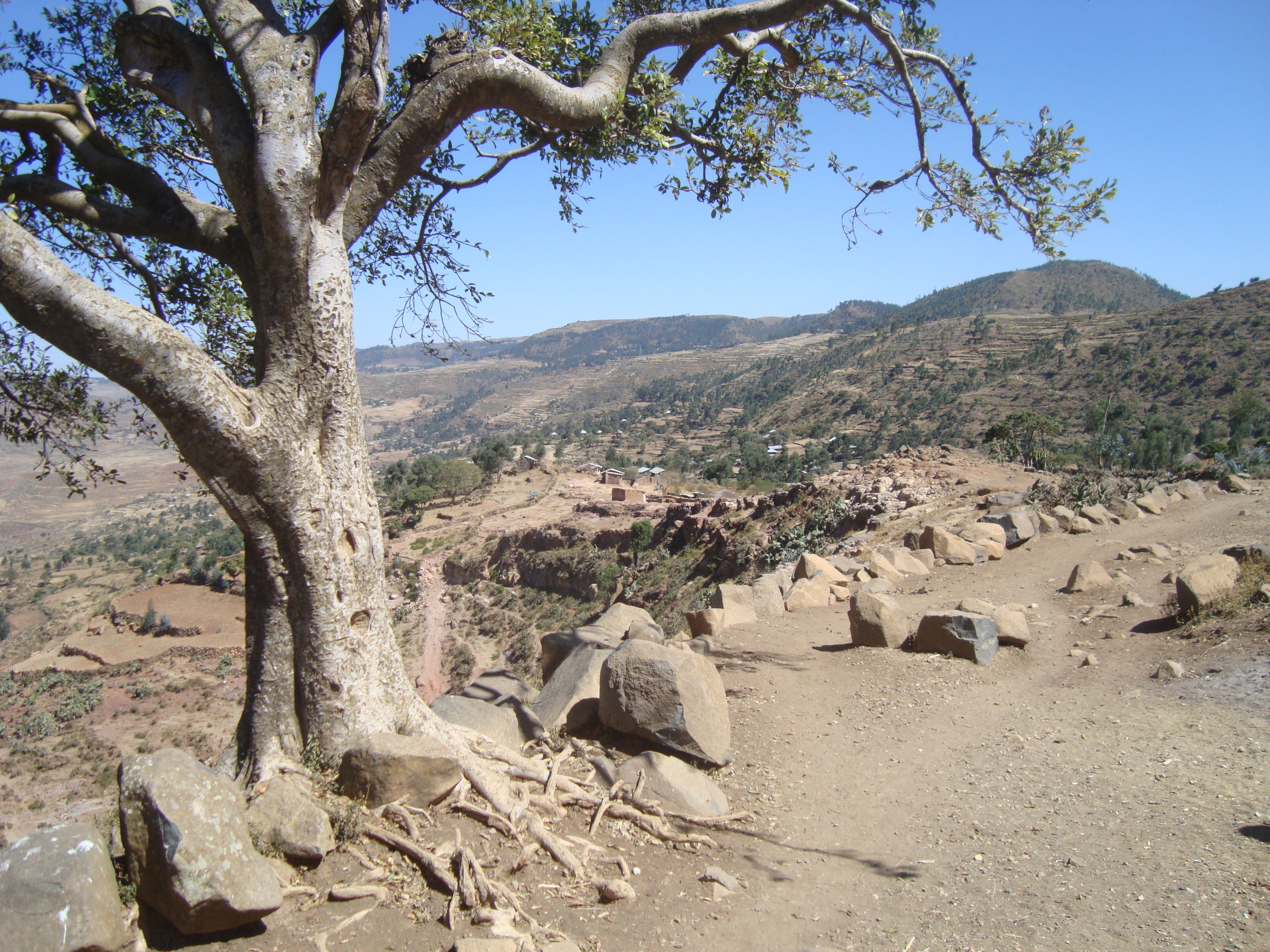
- View on Addi Gotet village

- Location within Ethiopia
- Coordinates: 13°37′N 39°6′E
- Country: Ethiopia
- Region: Tigray
- Zone: Debub Misraqawi (Southeastern)
- Woreda: Dogu'a Tembien

Area
  - Total: 28.48 km^{2} (11.00 sq mi)
- Elevation: 2,500 m (8,200 ft)

Population (2007)
  - Total: 4,497
  - Density: 158/km^{2} (410/sq mi)
- Time zone: UTC+3 (EAT)

Aregen is a tabia or municipality in the Dogu'a Tembien district of the Tigray Region of Ethiopia. The tabia centre is in Addi Gotet village, located approximately 11 km (6.8 mi) to the west-southwest of the woreda town Hagere Selam.

== Geography ==
The tabia occupies an elongated ridge between the gorges of Upper Tanqwa and Tsech'i Rivers. The highest peak is near Aregen village (2,660 m (8,730 ft) a.s.l.) and the lowest place at the confluence of the two rivers (1,897 m (6,224 ft) a.s.l.).

=== Geology ===
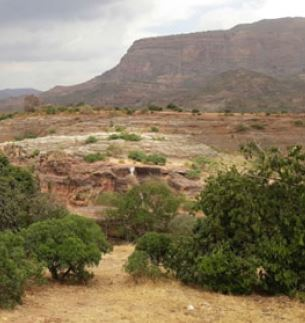
View towards Aregen from the west - visible rock is Adigrat Sandstone

From the higher to the lower locations, the following geological formations are present:

- Lower basalt
- Amba Aradam Formation
- Antalo Limestone
- Adigrat Sandstone

=== Geomorphology and soils ===
The main geomorphic units, with corresponding soil types are:

- Hagere Selam Highlands, along the central basalt and sandstone ridge
  - Associated soil types
    - shallow soils with high stone contents (Skeletic Cambisol, Leptic Cambisol, Skeletic Regosol)
    - moderately deep dark stony clays with good natural fertility (Vertic Cambisol)
    - deep, dark cracking clays, temporarily waterlogged during the wet season (Pellic Vertisol)
  - Inclusions
    - Rock outcrops and very shallow soils (Lithic Leptosol)
    - Rock outcrops and very shallow soils on limestone (Calcaric Leptosol)
    - Deep dark cracking clays with very good natural fertility, waterlogged during the wet season (Chromic Vertisol, Pellic Vertisol)
    - Shallow stony dark loams on calcaric material (Calcaric Regosol, Calcaric Cambisol)
    - Brown loamy soils on basalt with good natural fertility (Luvisol)
- Adigrat Sandstone cliff and footslope
  - Associated soil types
    - complex of rock outcrops, very stony and very shallow soils ((Lithic) Leptosol)
    - shallow, stony sandy [[loam soils (Eutric Regosol and Cambisol)
  - Inclusions
    - shallow, dry soils with very high amounts of stones (Leptic and Skeletic Cambisol and Regosol)
    - deep, dark cracking clays with good fertility, but problems of waterlogging (Chromic and Pellic Vertisol)
    - soils with stagnating water due to an abrupt textural change such as sand over clay (Haplic Planosol]])

=== Climate ===
The rainfall pattern shows a very high seasonality with 70 to 80% of the annual rain falling in July and August. Mean temperature in Addi Gotet is 18 °C, oscillating between average daily minimum of 10 °C and maximum of 25.7 °C. The contrasts between day and night air temperatures are much larger than seasonal contrasts.

=== Springs ===
As there are no permanent rivers, the presence of springs is of utmost importance for the local people. The main spring in the tabia is Gubarne in Kelkelay.

=== Reservoirs ===
In this area with rains that last only for a couple of months per year, reservoirs of different sizes allow harvesting runoff from the rainy season for further use in the dry season.

- Traditional surface water harvesting ponds, particularly in places without permanent springs, called rahaya
- Horoyo, household ponds, recently constructed through campaigns

=== Settlements ===
The tabia centre Addi Gotet holds a few administrative offices, a health post, a primary school, and some small shops. There are a few more primary schools across the tabia. The main other populated places are:

- Kelkelay
- Mahba
- Geshere
- Aregen
- Tsadqane

== Agriculture and livelihood ==
The population lives essentially from crop farming, supplemented with off-season work in nearby towns. The land is dominated by farmlands which are clearly demarcated and are cropped every year. Hence the agricultural system is a permanent upland farming system. The farmers have adapted their cropping systems to the spatio-temporal variability in rainfall.

== History and culture ==
=== Caves and archaeological sites ===
The Dabo Zellelew cave at the west of Aregen at a height of about 2000 metres, has been explored over 14.4 m but its distance is claimed to be way longer (13.621862°N 39.033077°E). It contains lithic tools, potsherds, engravings and paintings of Pastoral Neolithic age.

The Mihdar Ab'ur cave in the village of Mahba at a height of about 2500 metres, is some 64 m long (13.620592°N 39.051313°E). It contains engravings and paintings of Pastoral Neolithic age.

=== History ===
The history of the tabia is strongly confounded with the history of Tembien.

=== Religion and churches ===
Most inhabitants are Orthodox Christians. The following churches are located in the tabia:

- Mahba Mika'el
- Aregen Maryam
- Medhanie Alem
- Tsadqane Maryam

=== Inda Siwa, the local beer houses ===
In the main villages, there are traditional beer houses (Inda Siwa), often in unique settings, which are a good place for resting and chatting with the local people. Most renown in the tabia are

- Mebrahten Gebremeskel at Aregen
- Letebrhan Gebrekidan at Kelkelay

== Roads and communication ==
The main road Mekelle – Hagere Selam – Abiy Addi runs just east of the tabia. In Maygua there are regular bus services to these towns. Further, a rural access road links Addi Gotet to the main asphalt road.

== Tourism ==
Its mountainous nature and proximity to Mekelle makes the tabia fit for tourism.

=== Geotouristic sites ===
The high variability of geological formations and the rugged topography invites for geological and geographic tourism or "geotourism". Geosites in the tabia include:

- the "vase cave" in the gorge down from Tsadqane
- the wider Ruba Dirho area, densely vegetated in the valley bottom

=== Trekking routes ===
Trekking routes have been established in this tabia. The tracks are not marked on the ground but can be followed using downloaded .GPX files.

- Trek 6, follows the Ruba Dirho/Upper Tanqwa gorge, along the northern side of Aregen
- Trek 7, allows to visit the eastern part of Aregen
- Trek 20, in the Zeleqwa gorge, passes by the "vase" cave

=== Accommodation and facilities ===
The facilities are very basic. One may be invited to spend the night in a rural homestead or ask permission to pitch a tent. Hotels are available in Hagere Selam and Mekelle.

== See also ==
- Dogu'a Tembien district.
