= Melfa (Dogu'a Tembien) =

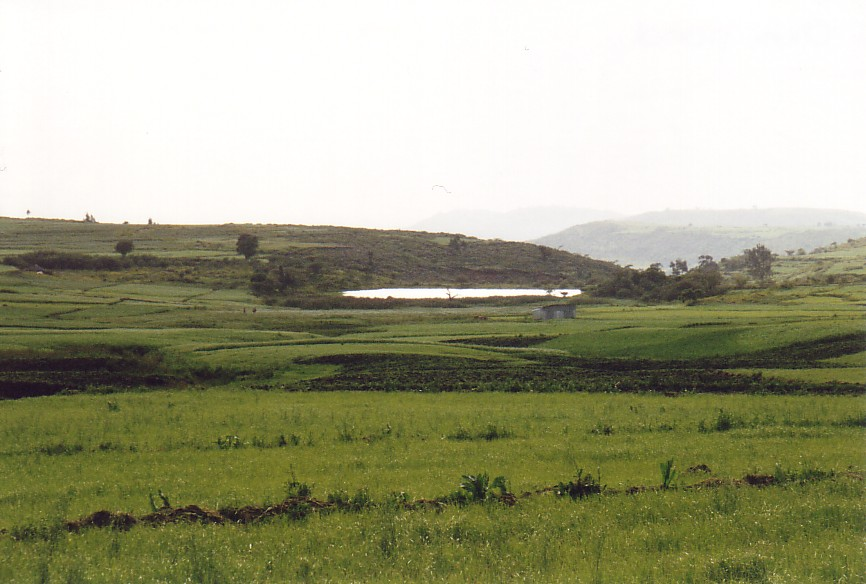
- The fertile lands of Melfa with Chini pond

- Location within Ethiopia
- Coordinates: 13.640395°N 39.13218°E
- Country: Ethiopia
- Region: Tigray
- Zone: Debub Misraqawi (Southeastern)
- Woreda: Dogu'a Tembien

Area
  - Total: 20.5 km^{2} (7.9 sq mi)
- Elevation: 2,500 m (8,200 ft)
- Time zone: UTC+3 (EAT)

Melfa is a tabiya or municipality in the Dogu'a Tembien district of the Tigray Region of Ethiopia and ancient capital of Tembien. The tabia centre is Melfa village itself, located approximately 3 km to the west of the woreda town Hagere Selam.

== Geography ==
The tabia stretches down from the ridge at 2700 m a.s.l. towards Zelekwa/Ruba Dirho River (2150 m a.s.l.).

=== Geology ===
From the higher to the lower locations, the following geological formations are present:

- Upper basalt
- Interbedded lacustrine deposits
- Lower basalt
- Amba Aradam Formation
- Antalo Limestone

=== Geomorphology and soils ===
The main geomorphic unit is the Hagere Selam Highlands. Corresponding soil types are:

- Associated soil types
  - shallow soils with high stone contents (Skeletic Cambisol, Leptic Cambisol, Skeletic Regosol)
  - moderately deep dark stony clays with good natural fertility (Vertic Cambisol)
  - deep, dark cracking clays, temporarily waterlogged during the wet season (Pellic Vertisol)
- Inclusions
  - Rock outcrops and very shallow soils (Lithic Leptosol)
  - Rock outcrops and very shallow soils on limestone (Calcaric Leptosol)
  - Deep dark cracking clays with very good natural fertility, waterlogged during the wet season (Chromic Vertisol, Pellic Vertisol)
  - Shallow stony dark loams on calcaric material (Calcaric Regosol, Calcaric Cambisol)
  - Brown loamy soils on basalt with good natural fertility (Luvisol)

=== Springs ===
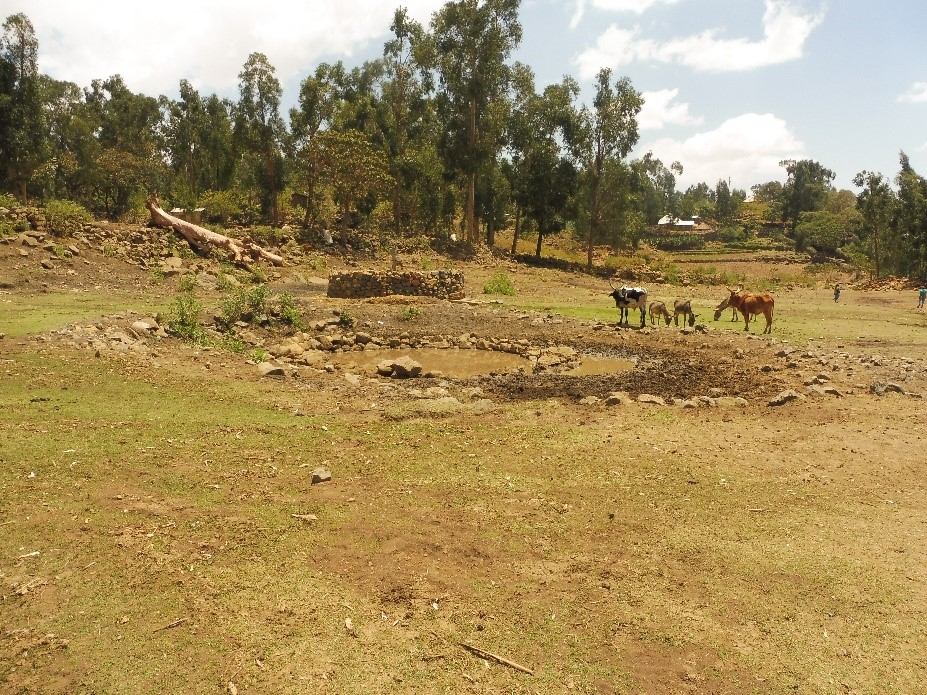
May Sa'iri water point

As there are no permanent rivers, the presence of springs is of utmost importance for the local people. The following are the springs in the tabia:

- May Ayni in Maekhel Gaza
- Shafahambar in May Sa'iri
- May Dera in May Krawa

=== Reservoirs ===
In this area with rains that last only for a couple of months per year, reservoirs of different sizes allow harvesting runoff from the rainy season for further use in the dry season. Overall they suffer from siltation. Yet, they strongly contribute to greening the landscape, either through irrigation or seepage water. In Melfa there is:

- Chini (reservoir), constructed in 1993
- Horoyo, household ponds, recently constructed through campaigns

=== Livelihood ===
The population lives essentially from crop farming, supplemented with off-season work in nearby towns. The land is dominated by farmlands which are clearly demarcated and are cropped every year. Hence the agricultural system is a permanent upland farming system.

Melfa, and more precisely the May Sa'iri school is one of the first places in Ethiopia where Ecosan toilets were built.

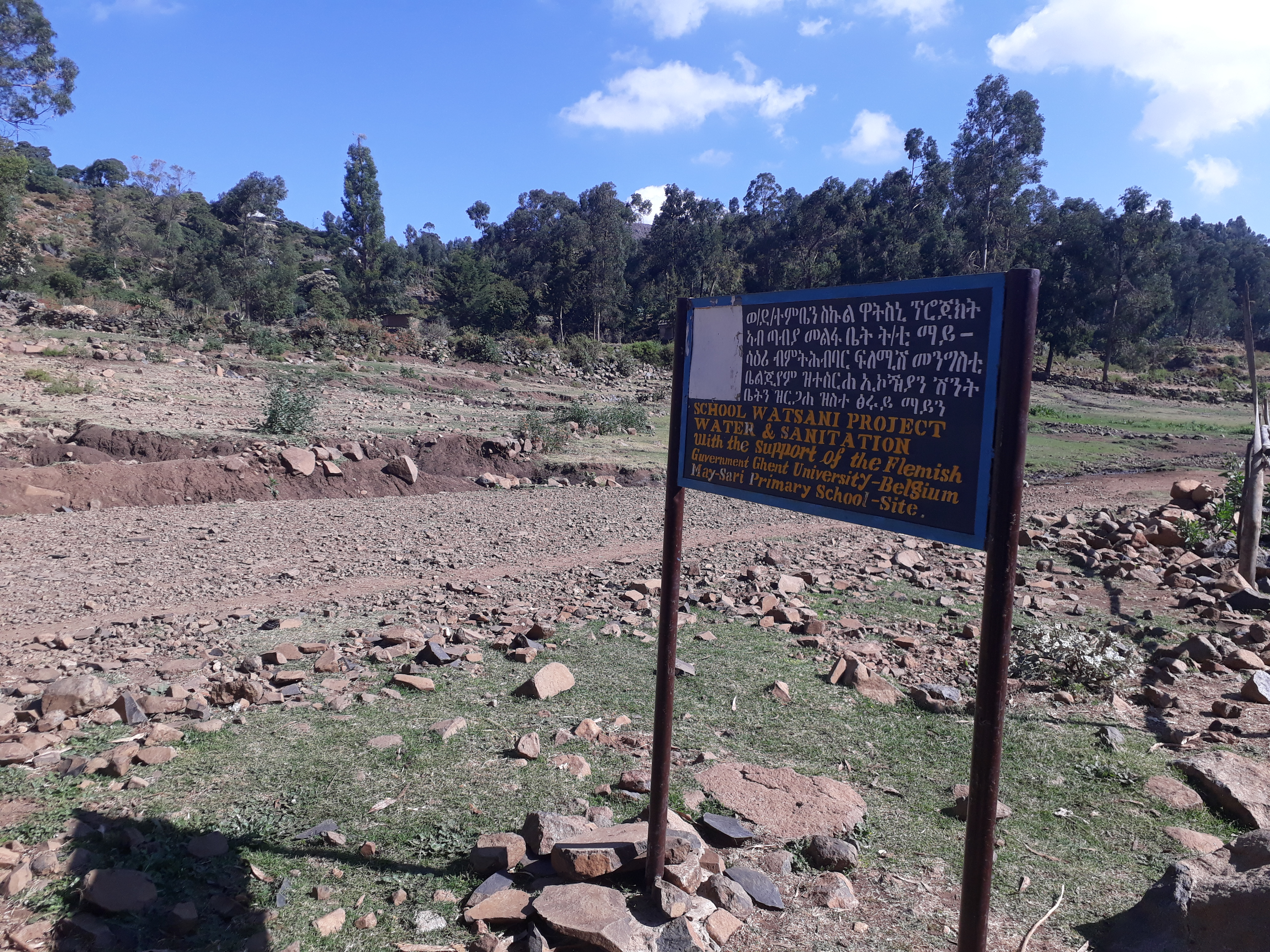
Signboard for Melfa School WatSani

=== Population ===
The tabia centre of Melfa holds a few administrative offices and some small shops. The main other populated places in the tabia are:

- Maekhel Gaza
- May Sa'iri

- May Krawa
- Sewhi Tekkay

=== Religion and church ===
Most inhabitants are Orthodox Christians. Most important church in the tabia is Melfa Maryam.

== History ==
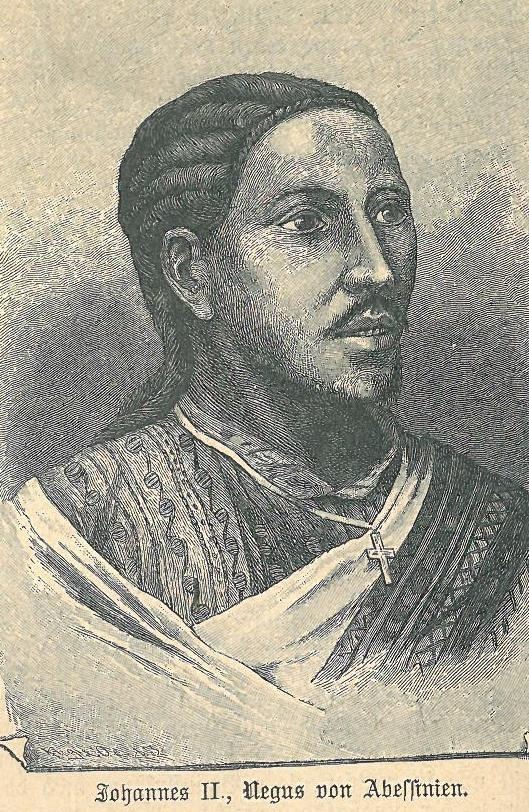
Emperor Yohannes

The history of the tabia is strongly confounded with the history of Tembien. As of the 19th Century, both oral traditions and written documents mention that the rulers of Tembien were based in Melfa. Best known is Emperor Yohannes IV, born in Melfa, and whose forefathers had managed to gain power through marriage with all the surrounding ruling families. Kassa (the future emperor Yohannes) controlled the Tembien highlands and later the whole of Tigray; ultimately he crowned himself king of kings of Ethiopia in 1872. However, Emperor Yohannes IV did not establish his capital in Melfa (due to relative inaccessibility), but in Mekelle and Adwa - these towns were well connected to the Red Sea and to inner Ethiopia. Yet, Yohannes kept strong links with Tembien, as indicated by the establishment of a (locally paved) horse-track between Melfa and Mekelle. In 1951, Gebru Gebrehiwot, the new governor, decided to create a new capital of Tembien. First the location of Melfa was chosen. As the inhabitants of Melfa rejected the idea, Hagere Selam was created as a new town. In the 1980s, the area became again a temporary capital in war-faring Ethiopia: the TPLF party established its HQ in a cave in nearby Mahbere Sillasie, whereas the EPDM used a cave in Melfa.

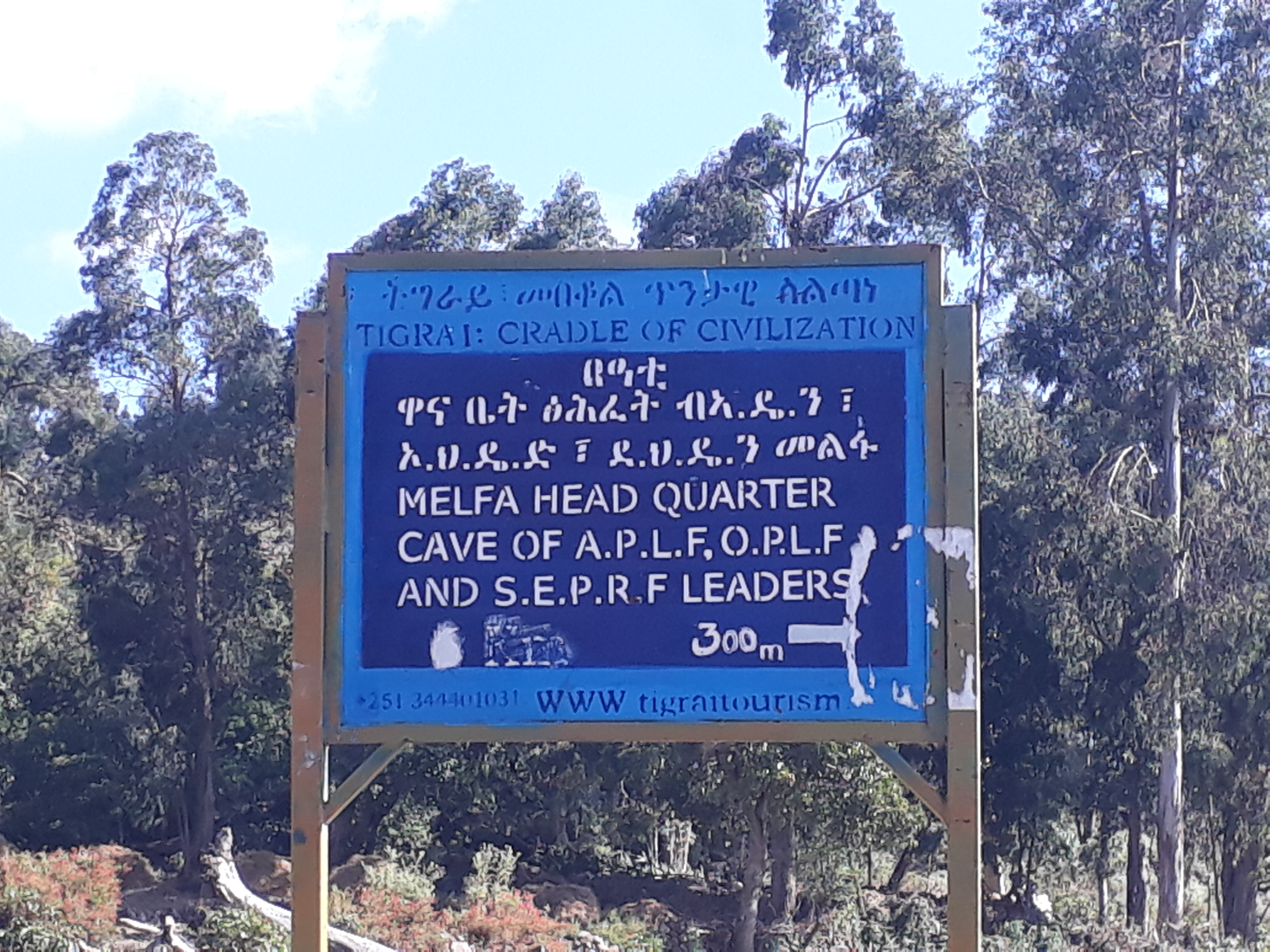
Signboard for EPDM/ANLF headquarters in Melfa during the Ethiopian Civil War

== Roads and communication ==
A rural access road links Melfa to the main asphalt road in Hagere Selam.

== Schools ==
Almost all children of the tabia are schooled, though in some schools there is lack of classrooms, directly related to the large intake in primary schools over the last decades. Schools in the tabia include May Sa'iri school.

== Tourism ==
Its mountainous nature and proximity to Mekelle makes the tabia fit for tourism.

=== Touristic attractions ===
- Historic birthplace of Emperor Yohannes
- Headquarters (caves) of the Amhara liberation movement (Ethiopian People's Democratic Movement) during the Ethiopian civil war

=== Geotouristic sites ===
The high variability of geological formations and the rugged topography invites for geological and geographic tourism or "geotourism". Geosites in the tabia include:

- Addi Selam soil catena
- Melfa dagets
- Chini (reservoir)

- Zeleqwa "vase" cave
- Melfa debris flow

=== Trekking routes ===
Trekking routes have been established in this tabia. The tracks are not marked on the ground but can be followed using downloaded .GPX files.

- Route 5 follows the upper ridge, north of Melfa
- Route 6 comes from Hagere Selam, and crosses Melfa diagonally towards the lower Ruba Dorho river
- Route 20 follows the Ruba Dorho and Zeleqwa rivers, at the southern side of Melfa

=== Inda Siwa, the local beer houses ===
In the main villages, there are traditional beer houses (Inda Siwa), often in unique settings, which are a good place for resting and chatting with the local people. Most renown in the tabia are

- Medhin Kassa at Maekhel Gaza
- Tsedal Girmay at Maekhel Gaza
- Gebregziabher Hagos at Maekhel Gaza

=== Accommodation and facilities ===
The facilities are very basic. One may be invited to spend the night in a rural homestead or ask permission to pitch a tent. Hotels are available in Hagere Selam and Mekelle.

== More detailed information ==
For more details on environment, agriculture, rural sociology, hydrology, ecology, culture, etc., see the overall page on the Dogu'a Tembien district.

== Gallery ==
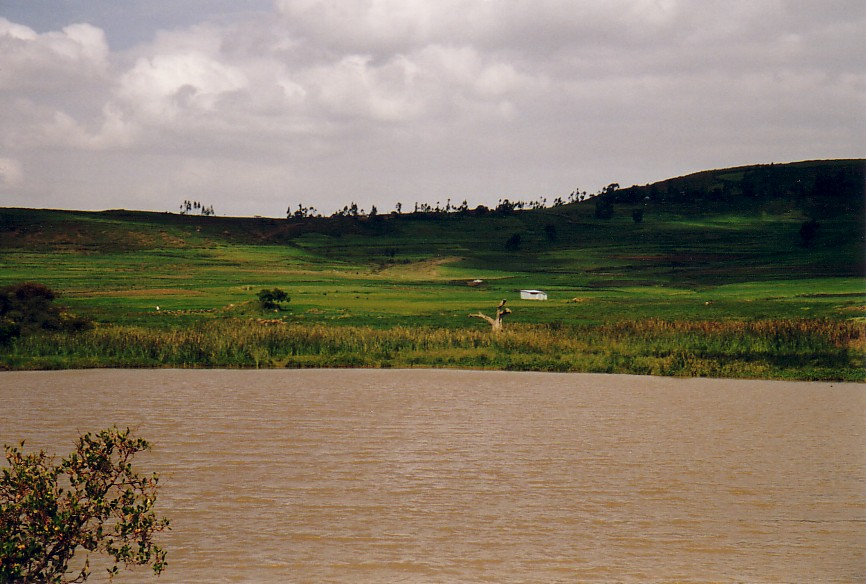
View on Chini (reservoir)

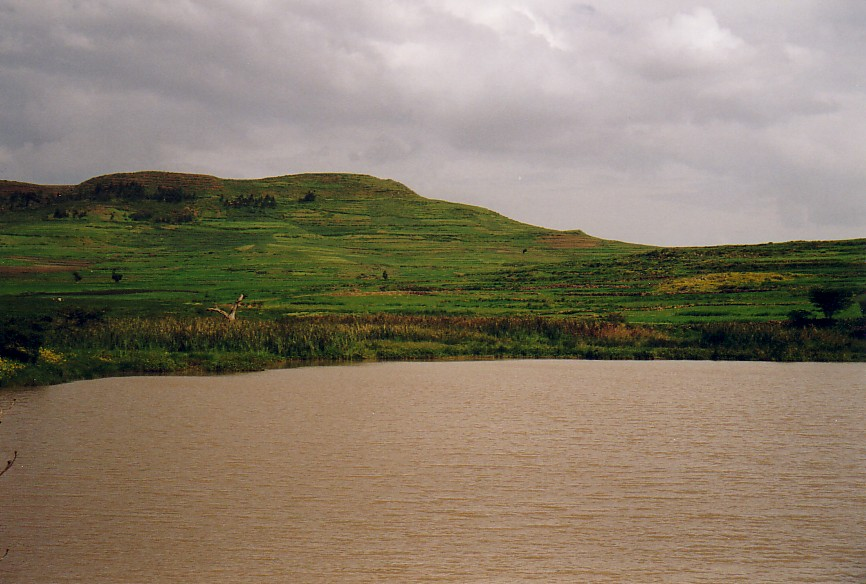
Another view on Chini
