= Tembien =

Historical region and province in Tigray Region, Ethiopia

Tembien (Tigrigna: ተምቤን) is a historic region in Tigray Region and former provinces of Ethiopia. It is a mountainous area of that country. During the reforms in 1994–95, the old provinces were replaced with regions, zones and woredas. The area of the former province is now split over the woredas of Dogua Tembien and Kola Tembien.

It was located east of the Semien Province, north of Abergele, and on the east, it was bordered by the Enderta Province.

The original capital of the province was Melfa, west of the current town of Hagere Selam; later on Abiy Addi, nowadays located in Kola Tembien (Lower Tembien), became the capital. The region reached a highpoint in the Tsatsen mountains at 2828 meters above sea level, just south of Hagere Selam.

== Prehistory ==
Tembien holds numerous prehistoric sites, which have been dated to the Middle Stone Age in Ayninbirkekin, or Pastoral Neolithic in Aregen and Menachek.

The Dabo Zellelew cave in Aregen at a height of about 2000 metres, has been explored over 14.4 m but its distance is claimed to be way longer (13.621862°N 39.033077°E). It contains lithic tools, potsherds, engravings and paintings of Pastoral Neolithic age.

The Mihdar Ab’ur cave in the village of Mahba in Aregen at a height of about 2500 metres, is some 64 m long (13.620592°N 39.051313°E). It contains engravings and paintings of Pastoral Neolithic age.

The Danei Kawlos cave in the Tsech'i gorge at the west of Menachek at a height of about 2020 metres, is some 13.5 metres long (13.621862°N 39.033077°E). It contains lithic tools, potsherds, and faunal remains of Pastoral Neolithic age.

Further down, the May Ila open-air site in the Tsech'i gorge at the extreme west of Menachek at a height of about 1990 metres (13.609826°N 39.028260°E). It contains blades, blade cores, and a few potsherds of Pastoral Neolithic age.

These sites are found on the routes that lead from the northwestern lowlands of Ethiopia to the northern highlands via Tembien that holds a large number of distributions of rock art sites.

== Historical geography ==
Tembien in the past was at least partially inhabited by Agew people and there are still Agew communities south of Tembien, in Abergele. The border between Tigray proper (area surrounding Aksum and Adwa) and Tembien traditionally was the Wer’i river. This is why Tembien was also called “Wer’i Mellash” (‘beyond the Wer’i’). Whereas several other Tigrinya-speaking provinces were less linked with the centre, Tembien was often linked with Tigray proper (Adwa) in a dynamic way. In the rainy season, Tembien became full autonomous because the Wer’i river was an unpassable border. However, during dry seasons Tembien accepted the authority of Tigray proper. Tembien appears on indigenous maps of the northern Horn of Africa in the 15th Century.

== A history linked to ecology and seasonality ==
In Tembien's history, the farmers’ culture, life cycle and livelihood linked with the land are important.

=== Political ecology ===
There were hierarchical structures in which the large landowners owned most of the land, assumed positions and controlled the peasants. It was common that half of the crop yield needed to be given to the lord what led to great misery in the villages.

=== Importance of seasons ===
The seasons organised also the (political) life: after the harvest, young men often migrated seasonally to

- Wer’i valley for gold panning and incense harvesting
- Bigger courts such as the Ethiopian ruler's court
- Such migrations could lead to permanent establishment in other areas such as the numerous Tembienot established in Hamasien, around Asmara in Eritrea

=== War cycles ===
Young farmers, at the slack season, and in need of additional income, were often enrolled in armies, where they hoped to get noticed and receive a position. Hence, the war cycle followed the seasons. In the rainy seasons, when warfare was difficult anyway, the farmers were back on their land to plough and harvest.

== Christianity in Tembien ==
As evidenced by the numerous monolithic churches in Tembien, the socio-political organisation is based on Oriental Orthodox Christianity since ancient times. There are even manuscripts referring to a mediaeval monastic movement, in which the leaders originated from Tembien. There is an important pilgrimage every year to the Abba Selama monastery, situated on an almost inaccessible rock that can only be reached at the peril of one's life. After Aksum, this would be the oldest church of Ethiopia, established by the first Syrian missionary, Frumentius, commonly named “Abba Selama”. The monastery was even represented on a 17th-century map of Ethiopia. Like Mount Athos in Greece, the local monks do not recognise the state authority over the monastery. Emperor Yohannes IV was baptised at the St. Mary church of Melfa. It is painted with scenes of his reign, and there are numerous gifts of the Emperor present in the church. Nowadays, every church serves also as a meeting place for the community. On Sundays, the villagers meet in the church compound after church service around a cup of blessed siwa (beer). This and other informal traditional meetings and associations allow self-organisation of the peasant communities.

== The Tembien dynasty ==
=== Early rulers of Tembien ===
The first written source that mentions Tembien is about a war expedition of one of its late-Aksumite rulers against the Nubian Alodia kingdom. Written sources particularly about “princes of Tembien” became more dense starting from the 14th C. Starting from the 17th century the title of lord of Tembien was transmitted in the same family, while also getting approval from the Ethiopian Emperor. Hence, the degree of autonomy could vary. We know that, in the 17th C., Tembien was part of the larger Agame, led by Kiflewahid, but after his death, Tembien became autonomous.

=== Emperor Yohannes IV ===
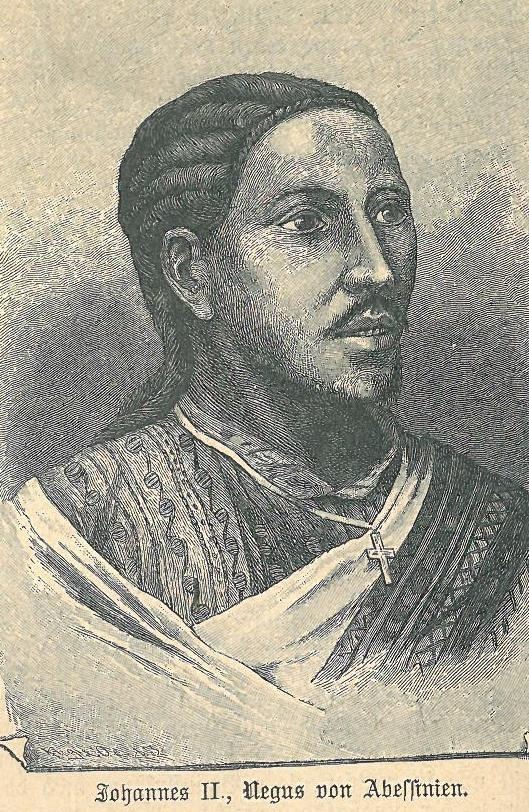
Emperor Yohannes

As of the 19th Century, both oral traditions and written documents mention that the rulers of Tembien were based in Melfa. Best known is Emperor Yohannes IV, whose forefathers had managed to gain power through marriage with all the surrounding ruling families. Kassa (the future emperor Yohannes) controlled the Tembien highlands and later the whole of Tigray; ultimately he crowned himself king of kings of Ethiopia in 1872.

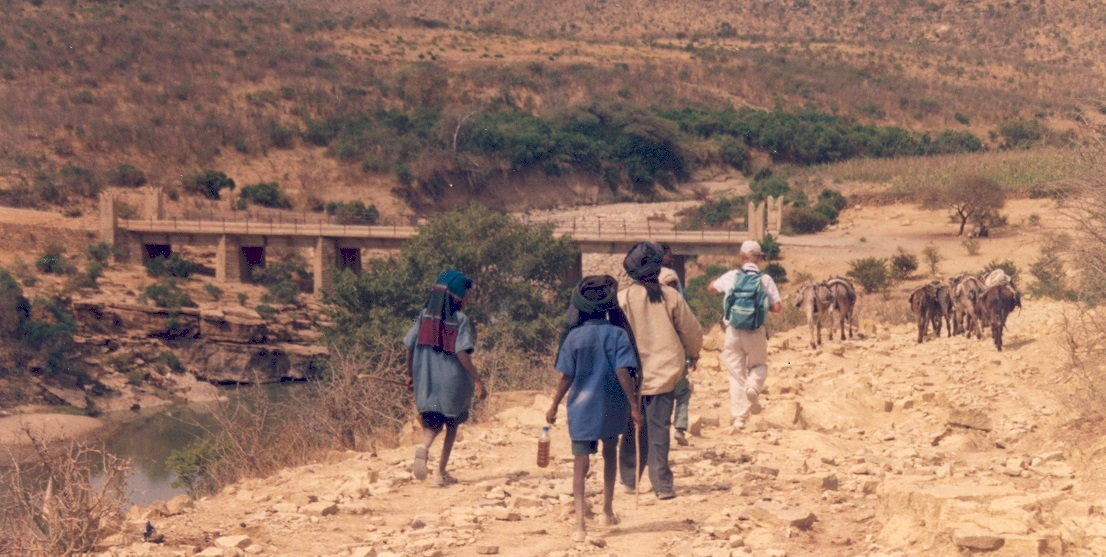
Bridge over Giba river, built by order of Mengesha Seyoum in the 1960s

However, Emperor Yohannes IV did not establish his capital in Tembien (due to relative inaccessibility), but in Mekelle and Adwa - these towns were well connected to the Red Sea and to inner Ethiopia. However Yohannes’ kept strong links with Tembien, as indicated by the establishment of a (locally paved) horse-track between Melfa and Mekelle, passing through the V-notched Ksad Mederbai. He also ordered to build the Abune Aregawi church in Zeyi, after being informed about the discovery of a large cave there. Also his successors kept connections with Tembien:

- His grandson Seyoum Mengesha was based in Abiy Addi, from where he also fought against the Italian invasion in 1935.
- His grand-grandson Mengesha Seyoum, governor of Tigray after the Second World War participated yearly in the annual patron's day at Abune Aregawi church in Zeyi which Yohannes had built. He also ordered to build a road and a bridge linking Dogu'a Tembien and Inderta.

=== The dynasty in Tembien ===
There were complex succession rules in Tembien, including transfer of positions through female lines. Some of the better-known 19th century higher ranked leaders of Tembien were:

- Shum Tembien Weldekirkos
- Shum Tembien Weldemikael Weldekirkos
- Shum Tembien Weldekidan Weldemikael
- Shum Tembien Mircha Weldekidan and his brother Dejazmatch Whade Weldekidan
- Imebet Wiba
- Tigrayan politician Bejirond Lawt’e
- Deggiyat Wehade, governor of Upper Tembien. His descendants still live in Hagere Selam
- Alula Qubbi, a peasant-warrior from Mennawe in Dogu’a Tembien. He rose to position of general and fought the Italians in Adwa in 1896

== 1930s and 1940s ==
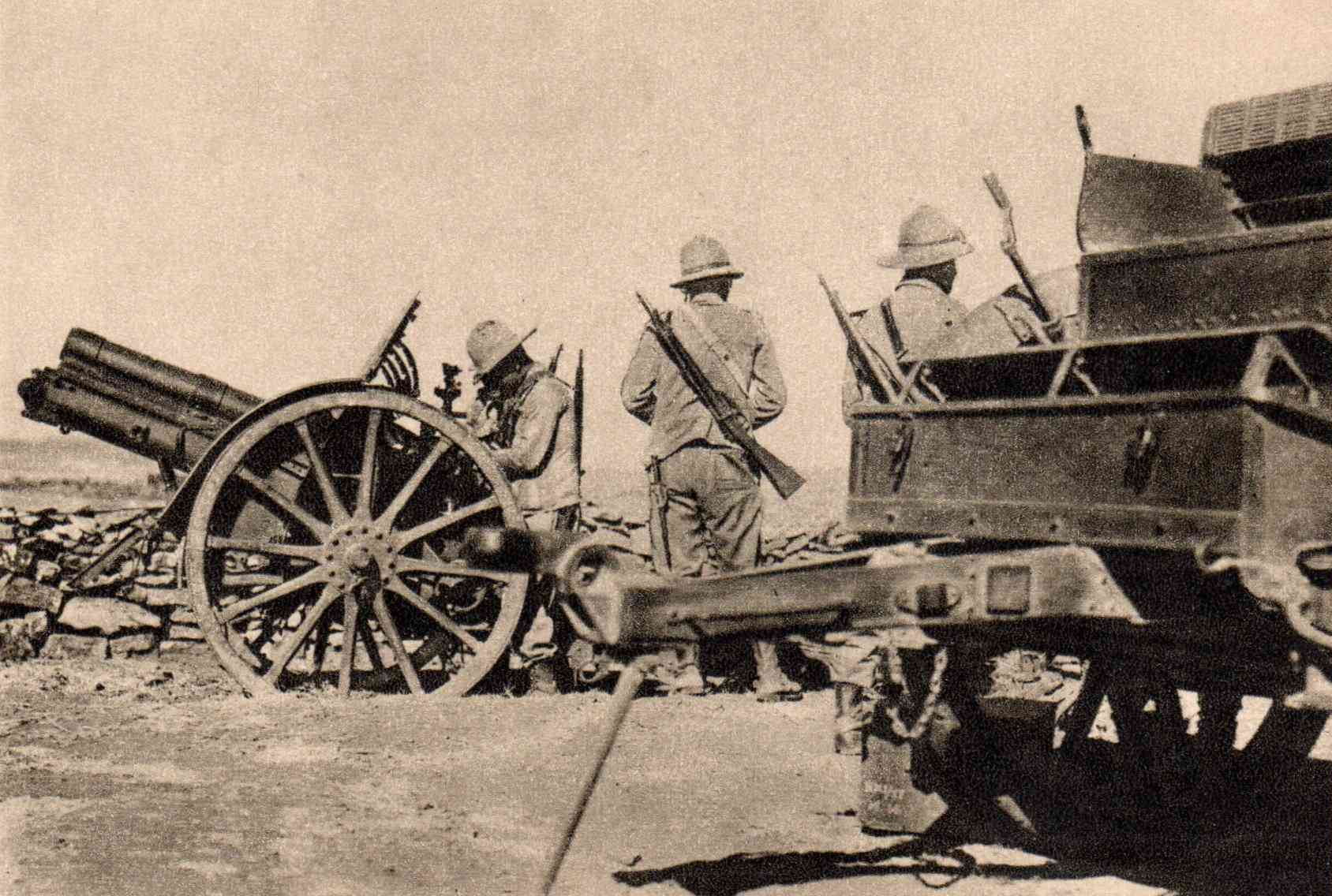
Italian artillery in Tembien

=== First battle of Tembien ===
In 1935 and 1936, the Italians invaded Ethiopia, coming from the north (Eritrea). Tembien with its mountains and river gorges was a major obstacle on their way south. For instance, the armies of Seyoum Mengesha and Kassa Hailu regrouped there, and in January 1936, they caused important losses to the Italian army in the four-days First Battle of Tembien.

=== War crimes and suffering ===
During the Italian bombings of early 1936, the population tried to hide, for instance in caves. The soot on the ceiling of the (now abandoned) Mika'el rock church in Dogu'a Tembien evidences this

However, at the end of February, a turning point came when the Italians targeted the counterattacking Tembien troops from the north and the south, with air force support and large-scale use of mustard gas. This Second Battle of Tembien led to the Italians capturing the Tembien highlands and the final retreat of ras Siyyum and ras Kasa to the south. Souvenirs of this period are still vivid, and particularly the people know the caves and other places where their grandparents went hiding for the Italian bomb and gas attacks.

=== Strategic places, battle fields, and war crime scenes in Tembien ===
Many strategic places, battle fields, and locations of mustard gas bombings during the Italian wars are located in Tembien. In history books, they are commonly named by their Italian transliteration of the original Tigrinya name. This inventory provides the list of warfare sites with the (current) place name in Tigrinya, and their location.

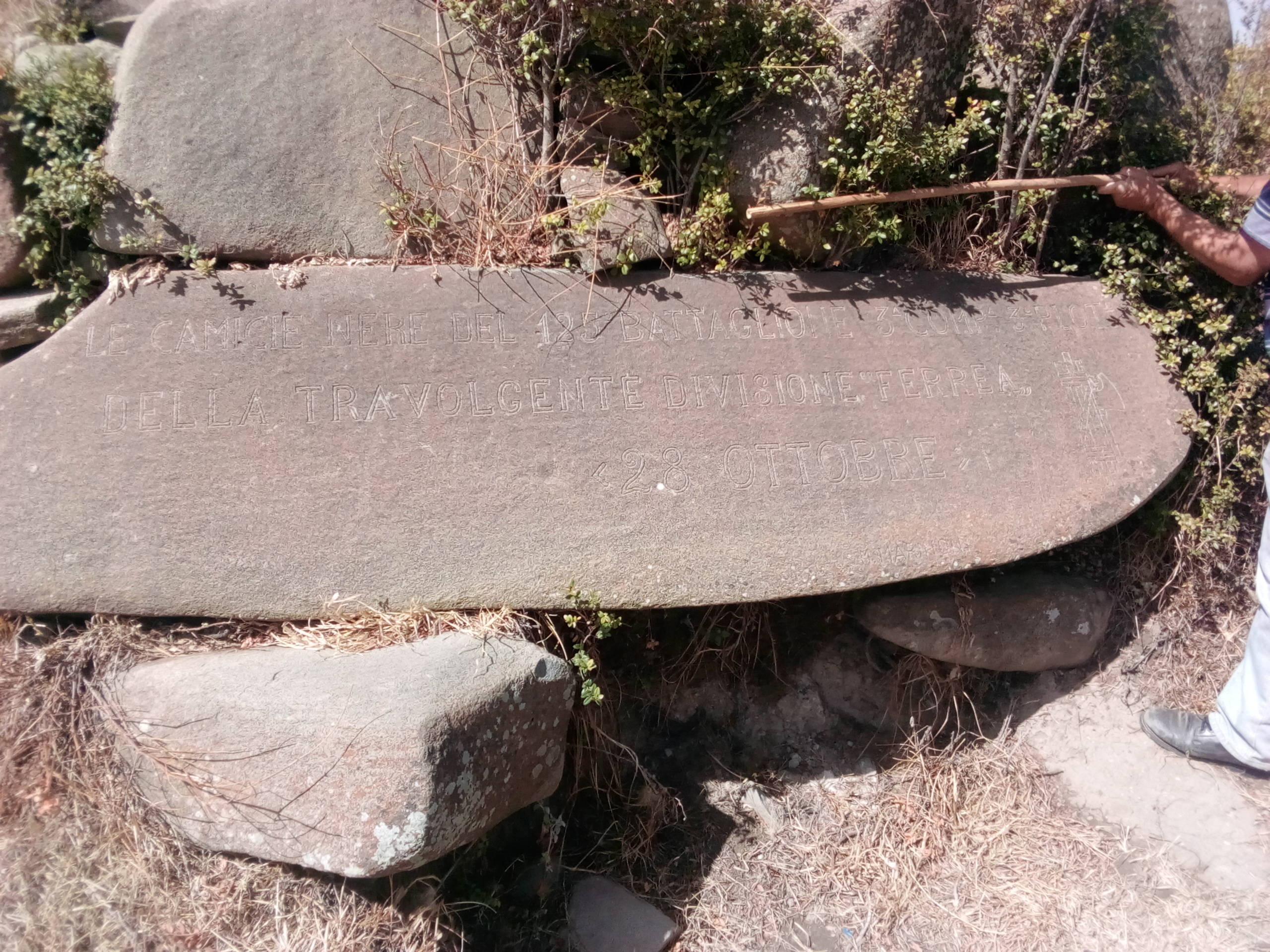
Italian memorial stone on the top of Dabba Selama Mountain

- Passo Abaro, or Ksad Azef in Haddinnet where a heavy battle was fought. Italian soldiers installed a memorial stone on the top of the nearby Dabba Selama Mountain
- Passo Mederbay
- Uarieu
- Andino
- Amba Uorc

=== Italian investments and retreat ===
As the Italians anticipated to stay for many years, they invested in road and other infrastructure projects, which also furthered some urbanisation along the roads, such as in Abiy Addi, which attracted settlers. Nevertheless, there was a centre of local resistance in Tembien, what greatly hindered a stable Italian presence. The Italians retreated in 1941.

=== First Woyane rebellion ===
The traditions of autonomy, the historical role in Tigrayan politics, and relative isolation on top of a massif made Tembien a centre of resistance after the Italian retreat. Tembien participated actively in the Woyane rebellion in 1943 that could only be put down with the help of the British Royal Air Force.

== Capitals ==
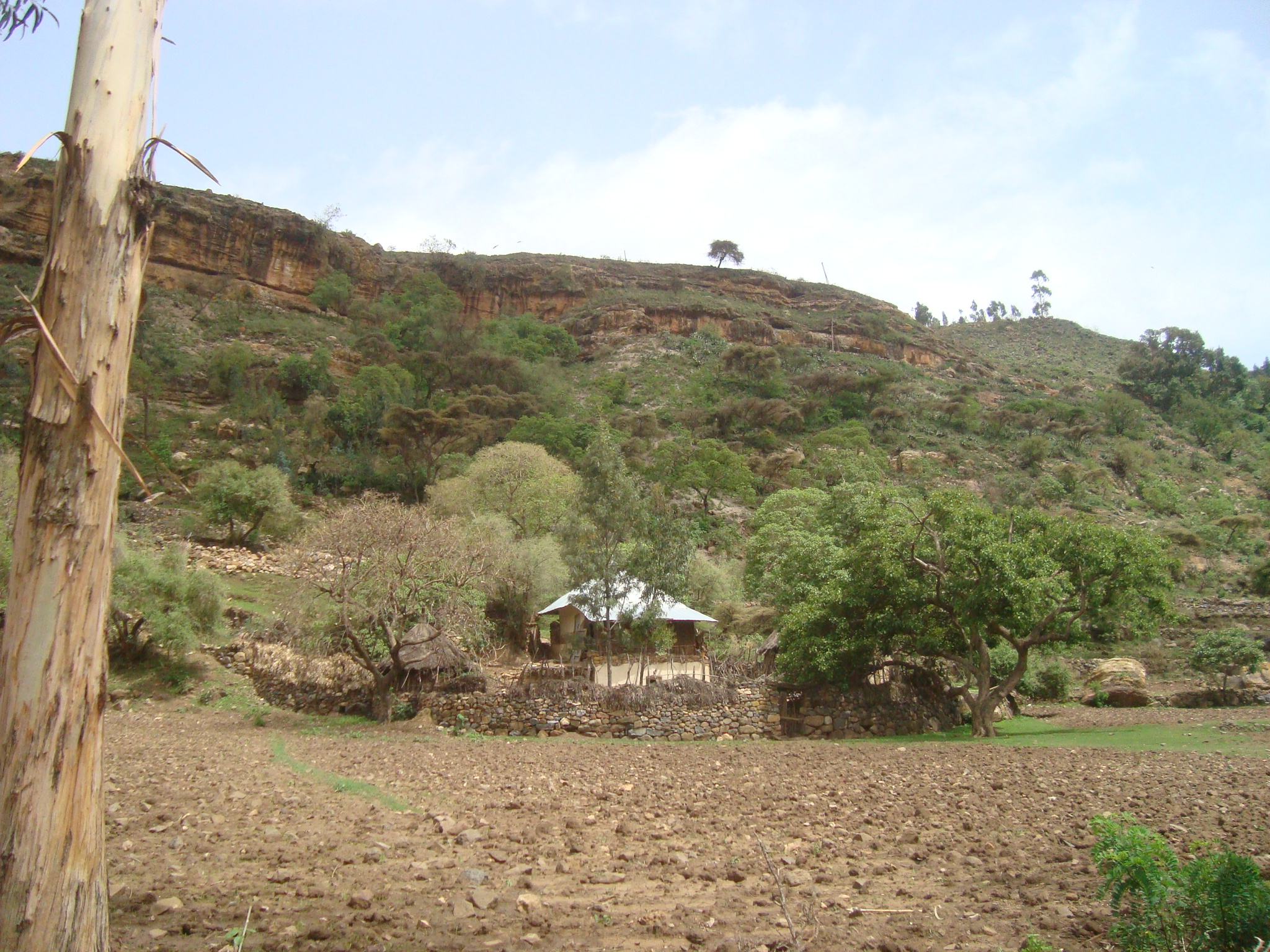
Cliff in Amba Aradam Sandstone at Addi Geza'iti; the TPLF headquarters are located in this cliff, at right under the tree

For a long time, Melfa, west of Hagere Selam, was the capital of Tembien; later on, the administration was established in Abiy Addi, as it was easier of access.

In 1951, Gebru Gebrehiwot, the new governor, decided to create a new capital of Tembien. First the location of Melfa was chosen. As the inhabitants of Melfa rejected the idea, Hagere Selam was created as a new town. It used already to be an open-air market place (hence the name "Idaga Hamus" or Thursday market) – the place was a strategically located mountain saddle, also called "May Aleqti". In practice, the capital remained in Abiy Addi. It was only after the district of Dogu’a Tembien was created that Hagere Selam started to grow. Basic modern infrastructure (electricity, tap water) came only in the early years 2000.

== Civil War ==
Both during the reign of Emperor Haile Sillasie and that of the military Derg regime, Tembien was marginalised, despite its closeness to Mekelle. In the 1980s, the TPLF, established its headquarters in a cave, again near Melfa, more particularly in Addi Geza'iti. From these underground rooms and offices cut out in sandstone cliffs, the TPLF carried out its political activities, including a major land reform; it was from here that the offensives were organised till the conquest of Addis Ababa in 1991.
