= Operation Alula =

2021 counter-offensive during Tigray War in Ethiopia

Operation Alula Aba Nega
- Part of Tigray War
Date	11 June 2021 – 6 July 2021
Location	Tigray Region, Ethiopia
Status	Tigrayan victory

Belligerents
Tigray	Ethiopia; Eritrea

Commanders and leaders
(Tigray Region) Tsadkan Gebretensae	(Ethiopia) Birhanu Jula (Eritrea) Filipos Woldeyohannes

Units involved
(Tigray Region) Tigray Defense Forces	Ethiopian divisions: (Ethiopia) Ethiopian infantry divisions; 11th infantry division; 20th infantry division; 21st infantry division; 24th infantry division; 25th infantry division; 31st infantry division; 32nd infantry division; Eritrean divisions: (Eritrea) Eritrean infantry divisions; 21st infantry division; 32nd infantry division

Strength
80,000	50,000

Casualties and losses
Unknown	18,000+ killed (TDF claim); 6,600 captured (TDF claim); 1 Lockheed C-130 Hercules
- At least 64 civilians killed

Operation Alula Aba Nega (Tigrinya: ወፍሪ አሉላ አባ ነጋ), commonly shortened to Operation Alula (Tigrinya: ወፍሪ አሉላ), was a counter-offensive during the Tigray War by the Tigray Defense Forces against the Ethiopian military and its allies in Tigray. The operation was named after Ethiopian general Ras Alula Aba Nega, who was of Tigrayan descent. The offensive was launched on 11 June 2021 and recaptured vast swaths of territory across central and eastern Tigray, including the regional capital of Mekelle.

== Battle ==
On June 11, the Tigray Defense Forces (TDF) launched a series of offensives against the isolated Ethiopian 11th division in Yechila, forcing it to retreat to Shewate Higum. The TDF simultaneously sent detachments to block Ethiopian reinforcements from rescuing the 11th. The Ethiopian 21st division was dispatched from Mekelle, but was ambushed in Addi Esher near Gijet. Similarly, the 31st division, also sent to the rescue, was intercepted by Tigrayan forces around Agbe.

The Ethiopians attempted to respond with overwhelming force, deploying the 20th, 23rd, 24th and 25th. They advanced from Abiy Addi towards Shewate Higum, but once they moved past Shewate Higum towards Dawsira, they faced an onslaught as nearly all Tigrayan fighters in the region were mobilized and engaged in a series of attacks from all directions against the Ethiopians. Over three days of intense fighting ensured, where the Ethiopian units managed to initially repel the attacks and advance towards Yechila. However, before the Ethiopians reached the town of Yechila, Tigrayan fighters shot down an Ethiopian Air Force Lockheed C-130 Hercules plane carrying vital supplies and ammunition. This boosted the morale of the Tigrayan forces and the Ethiopian units began to falter under intense multipronged Tigrayan attacks. The Ethiopian forces soon began to disintegrate and retreat in disarray back to Mekelle, a Tigrayan detachment was sent to block the A2 highway leading south of Mekelle and captured Wukro, which left a brigade sized Ethiopian force trapped in Negash. On June 28, Tigrayan fighters captured the regional capital Mekelle after the remnants of the Ethiopian army withdrew, the next day Abiy Ahmed declared a "unilateral ceasefire". The TDF paraded thousands of captured Ethiopian soldiers through the streets of Mekelle as crowds cheered. Some Ethiopian units attempted to retreat into the Afar Region, Tigrayan troops caught up with them at Amentila near Abala, inflicting further losses.

According to Tigrayan sources, the Eritrean army situated around Shire Inda Selassie attempted to assist the Ethiopian army by deploying a few brigades of the 21st and 32nd infantry divisions, but were intercepted in Medebay Zana, where they faced devastating casualties. Fearing defeat, the Eritrean army withdrew from Shire, allowing the TDF to move in. Amhara Regional Forces stationed around Inda Aba Guna managed to withdraw across the Tekeze River without taking serious losses, but not before they destroyed the Tekeze bridge to prevent Tigrayan forces from advancing.
