= Melfa (disambiguation) =

The Melfa is a river in Lazio, Italy.

Melfa may also refer to:

- Melfa (Dogu'a Tembien), Ethiopia
- Melfa, Virginia, United States
