= Chini (reservoir) =

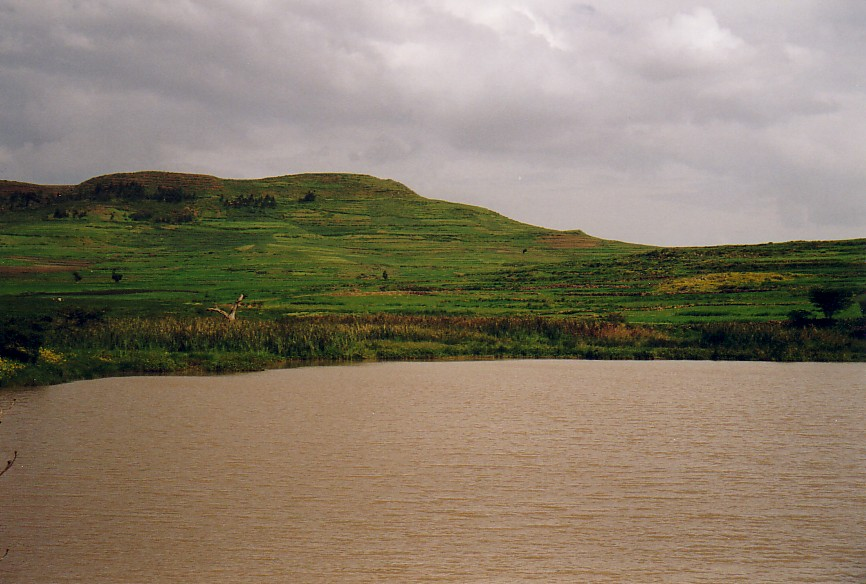

- Location within Ethiopia
- Coordinates: 13.655626°N 39.124926°E
- Type: Freshwater artificial lake
- Basin countries: Ethiopia
- Surface elevation: 2,580 m (8,460 ft)
- Settlements: Melfa

Chini is a small reservoir located in Melfa (Dogu’a Tembien woreda, Tigray Region, Ethiopia). The 151-metres long earthen dam that holds the reservoir was built in 1993 by the Relief Society of Tigray. It was mainly constructed for purpose of livestock watering. The catchment of the reservoir is 1.86 km² large, with a perimeter of 5.15 km and a length of 1800 metres. The reservoir suffers from rapid siltation. The lithology of the catchment is composed of Ashangi Basalts. Part of the water that could be used for irrigation is lost through seepage; the positive side-effect is that this contributes to groundwater recharge. Actually, in the wider surrounding of the reservoir, both upstream and downstream the level of the watertable has strongly raised, and the area has become remarkably greener.
