= Yechila =

Yechila Yech'ila, Yechilay, Yetchila, Yerhilay, Chilay
- Town
- Location in Ethiopia
- Coordinates: 13°17′N 39°0′E
- Country: Ethiopia
- Region: Tigray
- Zone: Maekelay Zone
- Woreda: Abergele
- Elevation: 1,571 m (5,154 ft)

Population (2005)
  - Total: 2,833 (est.)
- Time zone: UTC+3 (EAT)

Yechila (also Yechilay or Chilay) is a town in northern Ethiopia. Located in the Maekelay Zone of the Tigray Region, this town has a latitude and longitude of 13°17′N 39°00′E with an elevation of 1571 meters above sea level. It is located in the Mearey-tabia and is the administrative center of Abergele woreda.

Records provided at the Nordic Africa Institute website mention a rock-hewn church dedicated to Abuna Aregawi in the town. The British explorer Henry Salt camped overnight outside this town during his second journey through Ethiopia in 1809. Salt (who calls the settlement "Shela") records entering the province of Abergele the next day -- apparently the town was not part of the province at the time -- as well as finding a species of water cress growing in the area.

Based on figures from the Central Statistical Agency in 2005, Yechila has an estimated total population of 2,833 of whom 1,371 are men and 1,462 are women. The 1994 census reported it had a total population of 1,556 of whom 697 were men and 859 were women.
