= Regosol =

Reference Soil Group in the sWorld Reference Based for Soil Resources

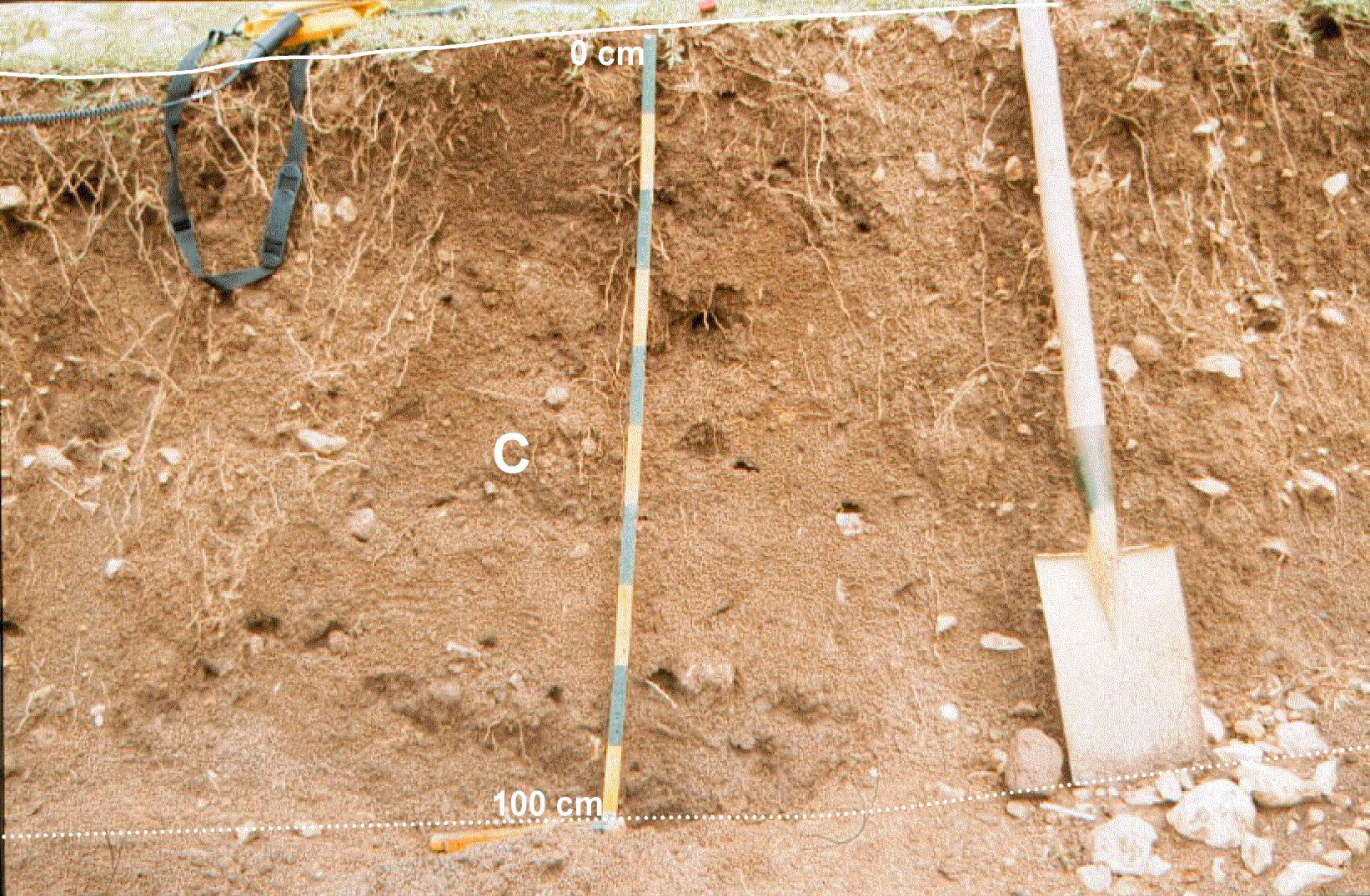
Calcaric Solimovic Regosol (Humic) in Degua Tembien, Ethiopia

A Regosol in the World Reference Base for Soil Resources (WRB) is very weakly developed mineral soil in unconsolidated materials. Regosols are extensive in eroding lands, in particular in arid and semi-arid areas and in mountain regions. Internationally, Regosols correlate with soil taxa that are marked by incipient soil formation such as Entisols in the USDA soil taxonomy or Rudosols and possibly some Tenosols in the Australian Soil Classification.

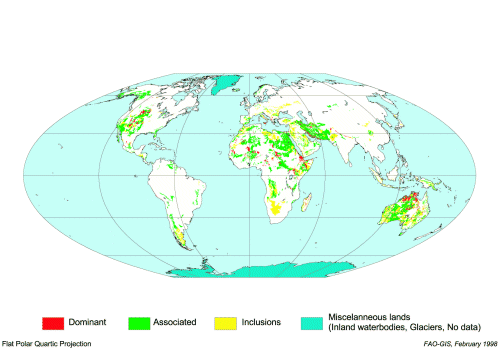
Distribution of Regosols

The group of Regosols is a taxonomic rest group containing all soils that could not be accommodated in any of the other groups. Excluded from the Regosols are weakly developed soils that classify as Leptosols (very shallow soils), Arenosols (sandy soils) or Fluvisols (in recent alluvial deposits). These soils have AC-profiles. Profile development is minimal as a consequence of young age and/or slow soil formation.

Land use and management of Regosols vary widely. Some Regosols are used for capital-intensive irrigated farming but the most common land use is low volume grazing. Regosols in mountain areas are best left under forest.

Regosols occur in all climate zones without permafrost and at all elevations. Regosols are particularly common in arid areas, in the dry tropics and in mountain regions.

Regosols cover an estimated 260 million hectares worldwide, mainly in arid areas in the mid-western United States, Northern Africa, the Near East and Australia. Some 50 million hectares of Regosols occur in the wet/dry tropics, most especially in northern Australia, and another 36 million hectares in mountain areas.

== See also ==
- Pedogenesis
- Pedology (soil study)
- Soil classification
