= Leptosol =

Shallow soil type which develops on rocky material

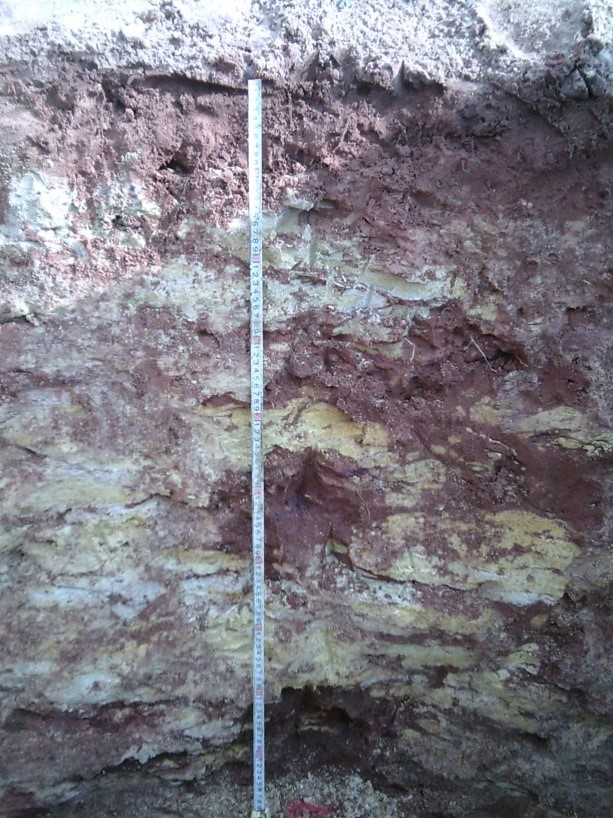
Leptosol in Agbe (Ethiopia)

A Leptosol in the World Reference Base for Soil Resources (WRB) is a very shallow soil over continuous rock or a deeper soil that is extremely rich in coarse fragments (gravelly and/or stony). Leptosols cover approximately 1.7 billion hectares of the Earth's surface. They are found from the tropics to the cold polar regions and from sea level to the highest peaks. Leptosols are particularly widespread in mountain areas, notably in Asia, South America, northern Canada and Alaska; and in the Saharan and Arabian deserts. Elsewhere, Leptosols can be found on hard rocks or where erosion has kept pace with soil formation or removed the top of the soil. In the FAO soil classification for the FAO/UNESCO Soil Map of the World (1974) the Leptosols on calcareous rock were called Rendzinas, those on acid rock were Rankers. The very shallow, less than 10 cm deep, Lithic Leptosols in mountain regions are the most extensive Leptosols on Earth.

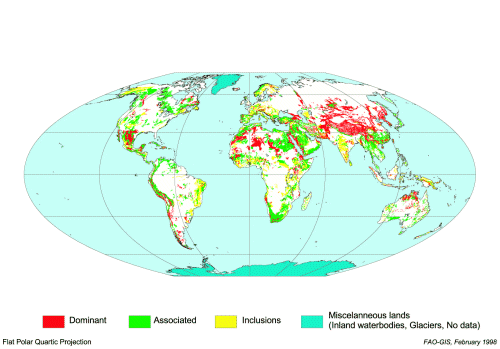
Distribution of Leptosols

Leptosols are unattractive soils for rainfed agriculture because of their inability to hold water, but may sometimes have potential for tree crops or extensive grazing. Leptosols are best kept under forest.

== See also ==
- Pedogenesis
- Pedology (soil study)
- Soil classification
