= Wrocław Valley =

Wrocław Valley Pradolina Wrocławska
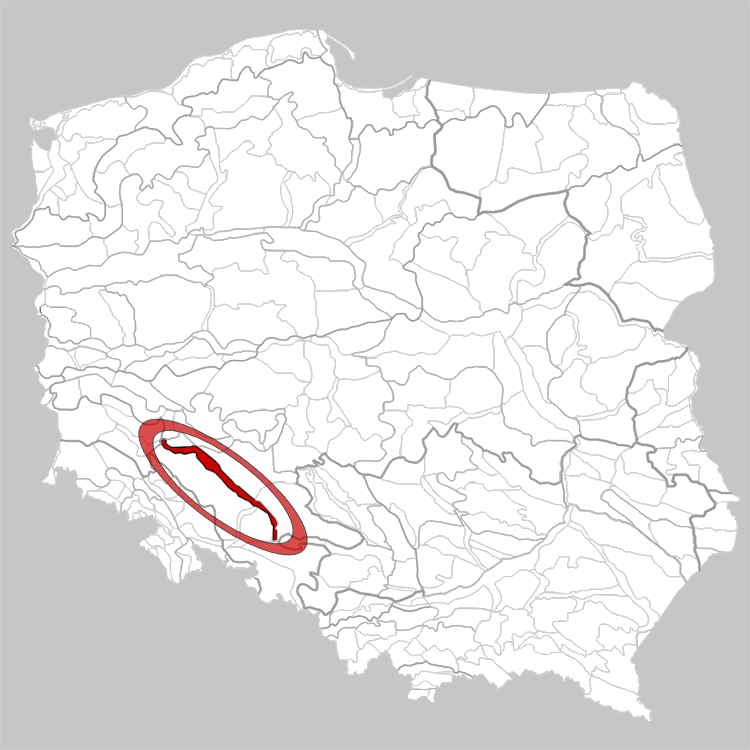
- Location of the Wrocław Valley in Poland
- Coordinates: 51°06′53″N 17°02′26″E
- Country: Poland

Area
  - Total: 1,220 km^{2} (470 sq mi)

Wrocław Valley (Pradolina Wrocławska, Polish) (318.52) is a mesoregion of great length, located in the Silesian Lowlands, with a total west-to-east length of 100 km, and a width of 10-12 km, totalling a surface area of 1220 km^{2}. From the north and the north-east, the mesoregion borders the Rościsławska Upland, Oleśnica Plain and the Opole Plain, from the north-west with the Wrocław Plain, the Nysa Kłodzka Valley and Niemodlin Plain. On the very north-western tip, the Wrocław Valley borders the Ścinawski Lowland, Lubin Upland and Legnica Plain, whilst on the north-easternmost tip, it borders the Chełm Upland (Silesian Highlands), and Racibórz Basin.

In geological terms, the Wrocław Valley is part of the Silesia-Kraków Monocline and the Sudetes Foreland Monocline, covered in Pleistocene and Holocene geological material, mainly sand, gravel and fluvisols.

The left tributaries of the River Odra in the mesoregion are: Osobłoga, Nysa Kłodzka, Oława, Ślęza, Bystrzyca, Kaczawa; and right: Mała Panew, Stobrawa and Widawa.

Larger settlements located on the Wrocław Valley are: Krapkowice, Opole, Brzeg, Oława, Wrocław, Brzeg Dolny, and Prochowice.
