= Grodków Plain =

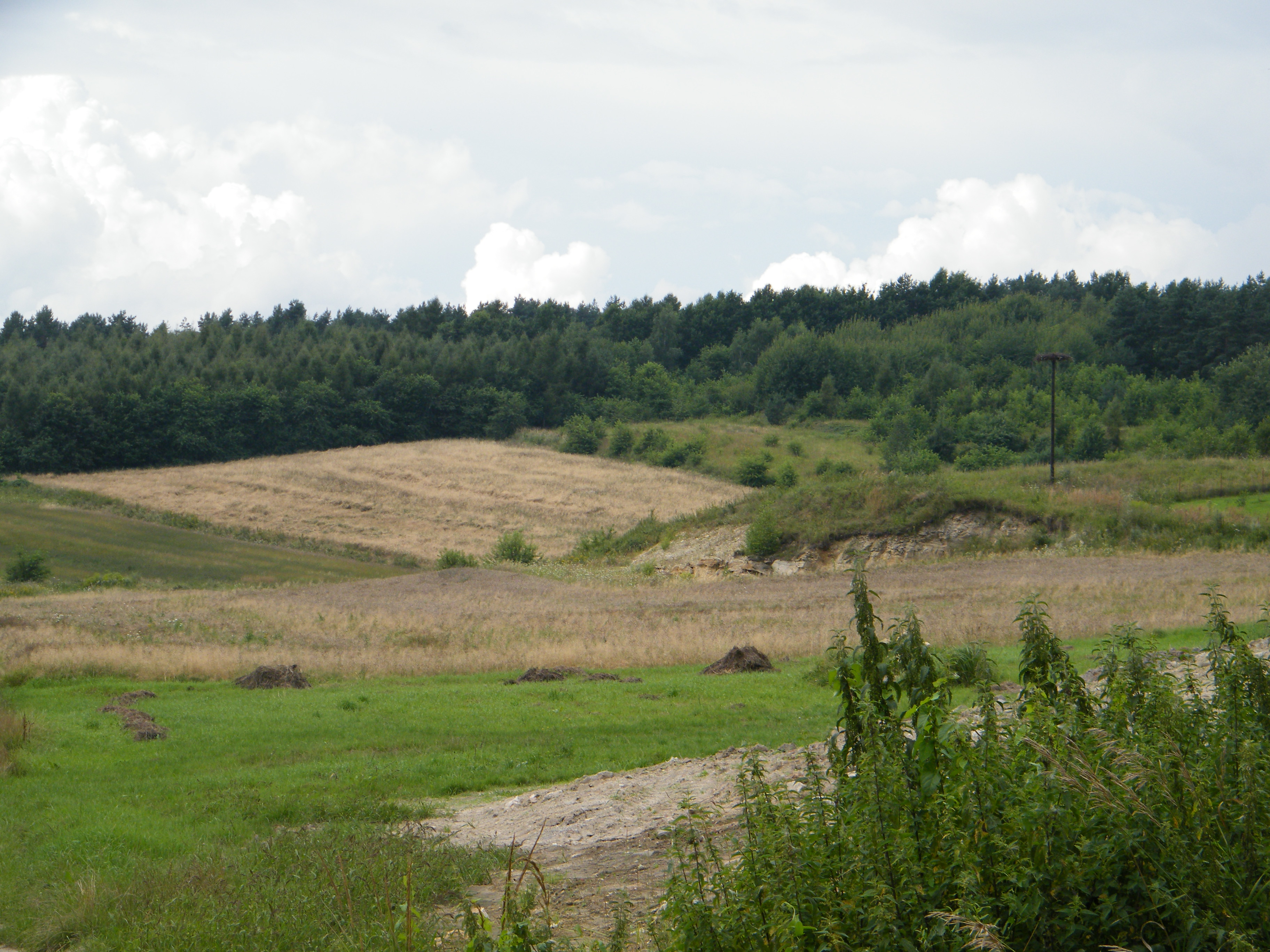
Grodków Plain

Grodkowska Plain (Polish: Równina Grodkowska) is a micro-region covering the south-eastern part of the Wrocław Plain in Poland, between the Oława, Oder and Neisse Kłodzka rivers; in the region there are upland moraine, eskers, fertile soil, and agriculture. The cities in the area are: Brzeg, Grodków, Lewin Brzeski, and Strzelin.
