= Soil in Kilte Awula'ilo =

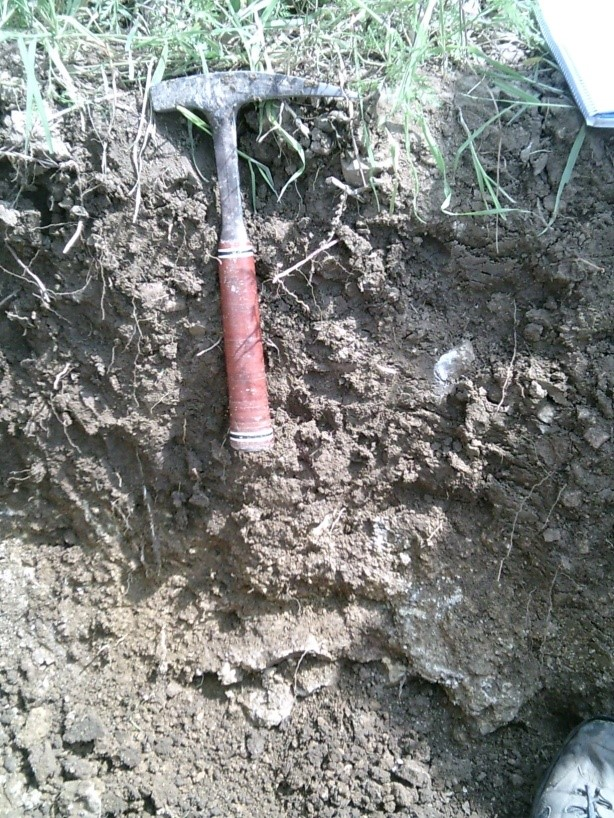
Mollic Calcaric Cambisol on an ancient river terrace in Birki

The soils of the Kilte Awula'ilo woreda (district) in Tigray, Ethiopia reflect its longstanding agricultural history, highly seasonal rainfall regime, relatively low temperatures, the presence of a wide depression at the foot of the Atsbi horst and steep slopes. Outstanding features in the soilscape are the wide ancient fluvial deposits, the soils of the granite batholith, cuestas and fertile lands behind tufa dams.

== Factors contributing to soil diversity ==
=== Climate ===
Annual rainfall depth is very variable with an average of around 600 mm. Most rains fall during the main rainy season, which typically extends from June to September. Mean temperature in woreda town Wuqro is 22.2 °C, oscillating between average daily minimum of 12.6 °C and maximum of 31.1 °C. The contrasts between day and night air temperatures are much larger than seasonal contrasts.

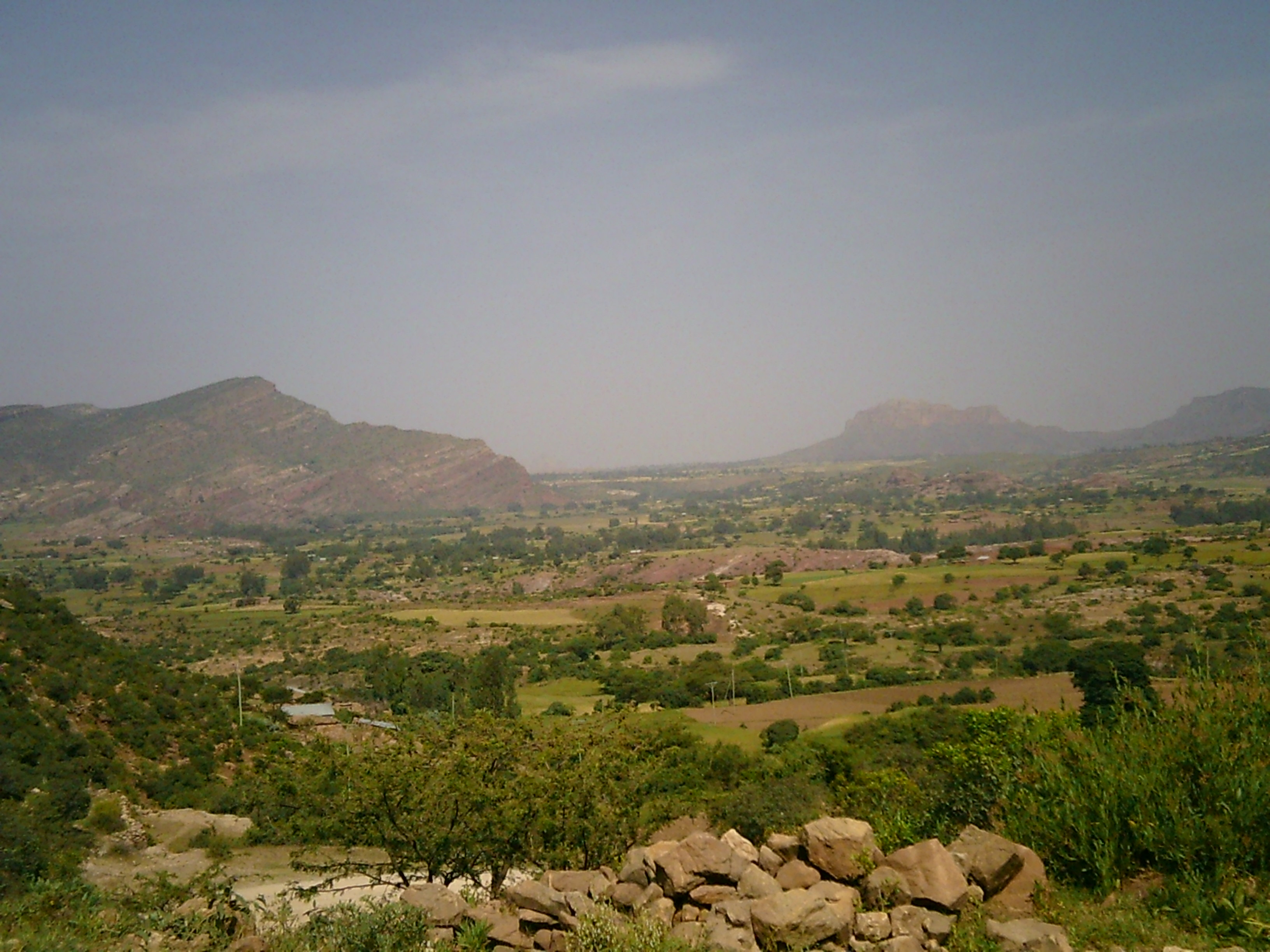
Cuesta landscape in Mesozoic sedimentary rock

=== Geology ===
The following geological formations are present:

- Agula Shale
- Antalo Limestone
- Adigrat Sandstone
- Enticho Sandstone
- Edaga Arbi Glacials
- Precambrian metamorphic rocks
- Quaternary alluvium and freshwater tufa

=== Topography ===
As part of the Ethiopian Highlands the land has undergone a rapid tectonic uplift, leading the occurrence of mountain peaks, plateaus, valleys and gorges.

=== Land use ===
Generally speaking, the level lands and intermediate slopes are occupied by cropland, while there is rangeland and shrubs on the steeper slopes. Remnant forests occur around Orthodox Christian churches and a few inaccessible places. A recent trend is the widespread planting of eucalyptus trees.

=== Environmental changes ===
Soil degradation in this district became important when humans started deforestation almost 5000 years ago. Depending on land use history, locations have been exposed in varying degrees to such land degradation.

== Geomorphic regions and soil units ==
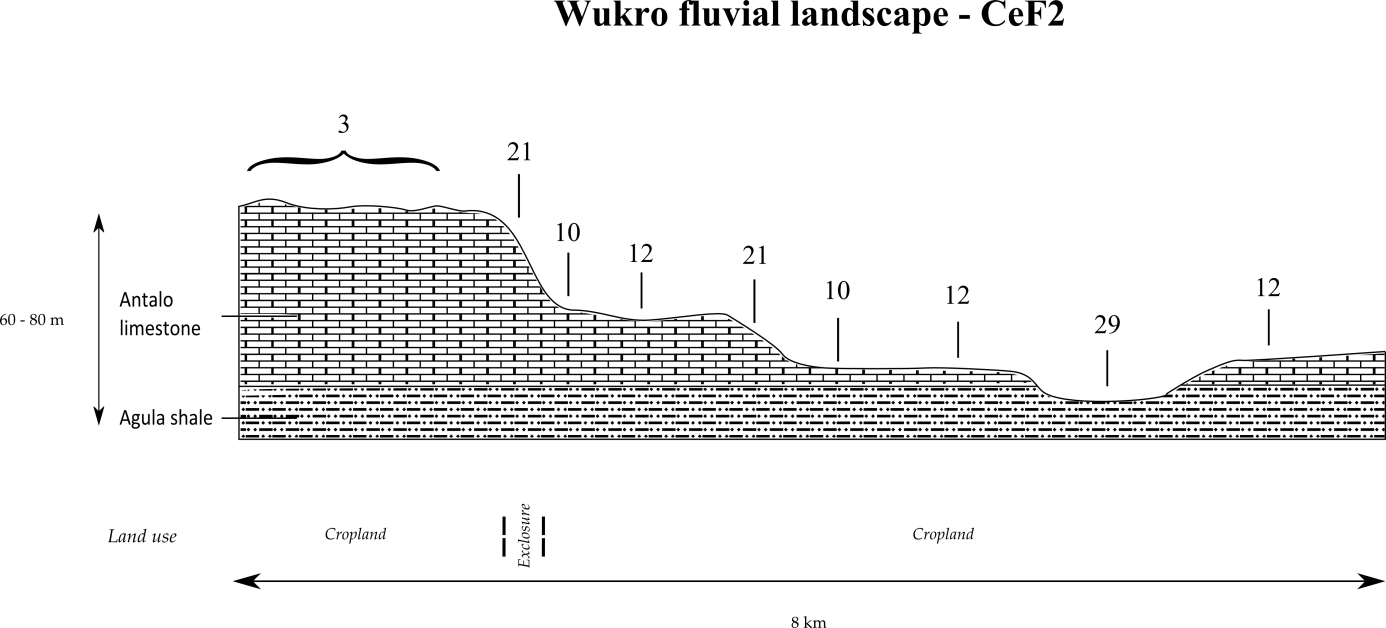
Typical catena in the Wuqro fluvial landscape

Given the complex geology and topography of the district, it has been organised into land systems - areas with specific and unique geomorphic and geological characteristics, characterised by a particular soil distribution along the soil catena. Soil types are classified in line with World Reference Base for Soil Resources and reference made to main characteristics that can be observed in the field.

=== Wuqro fluvial landscape ===
- Associated soil types
  - shallow, stony, dark, loamy soils on calcaric material (Rendzic Leptosol) (3)
  - moderately deep dark stony clays with good natural fertility (Vertic Cambisol) (10)
  - deep dark cracking clays with very good natural fertility, waterlogged during the wet season (Chromic Vertisol, Pellic Vertisol) (12)
- Inclusions
  - shallow, stony loam soils with moderate fertility (Eutric Regosol and Cambisol) (21)
  - Brown, silty loams to loamy sands developed on alluvium, with good natural fertility ((Mollic) Fluvisol, Fluvic Cambisol (29)

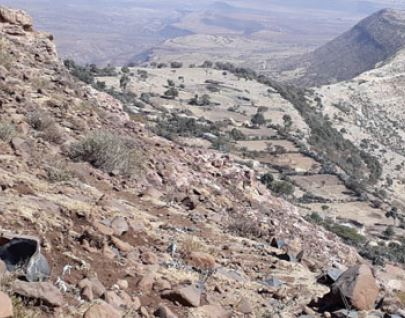
View on the incised Giba plateau, near Tsigereda

=== Incised Giba plateau, upstream of (future) Lake Giba ===
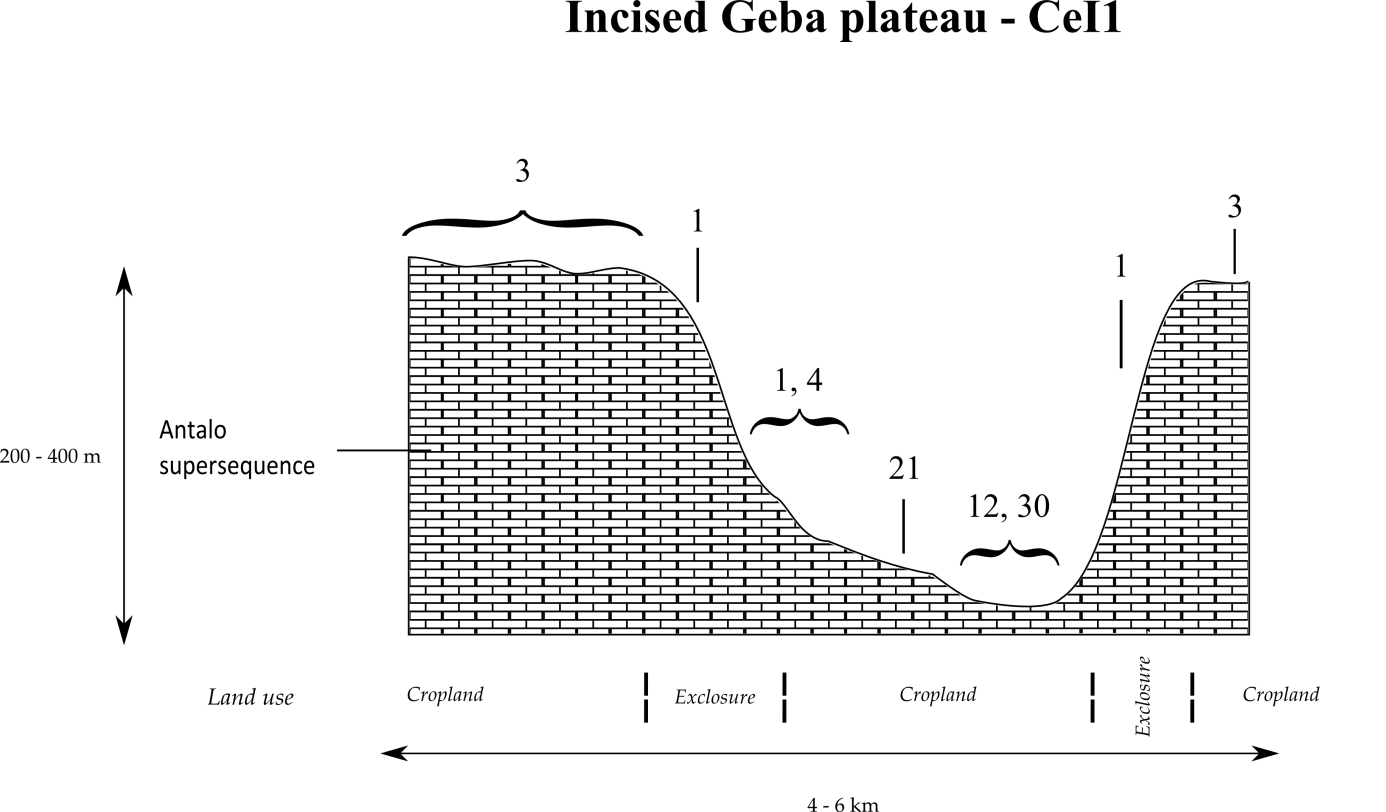
Typical catena on the incised Giba plateau

- Associated soil types
  - complex of rock outcrops, very stony and very shallow soils ((Lithic) Leptosol) (1)
  - shallow, stony, dark, loamy soils on calcaric material (Rendzic Leptosol) (3)
  - shallow to very shallow, very stony, loamy soils (Skeletic/Leptic Cambisol and Regosol) (4)
- Inclusions
  - Shallow, stony loam soils with moderate fertility (Eutric Regosol and Cambisol) (21)
  - Deep, dark cracking clays with good fertility, but problems of waterlogging (Chromic and Pellic Vertisol) (12)
  - Brown to dark, silty clay loams to loamy sands developed on alluvium, with good natural fertility (Fluvisol) (30)

=== Deeply incised mountainous area (escarpment towards Atsbi) ===
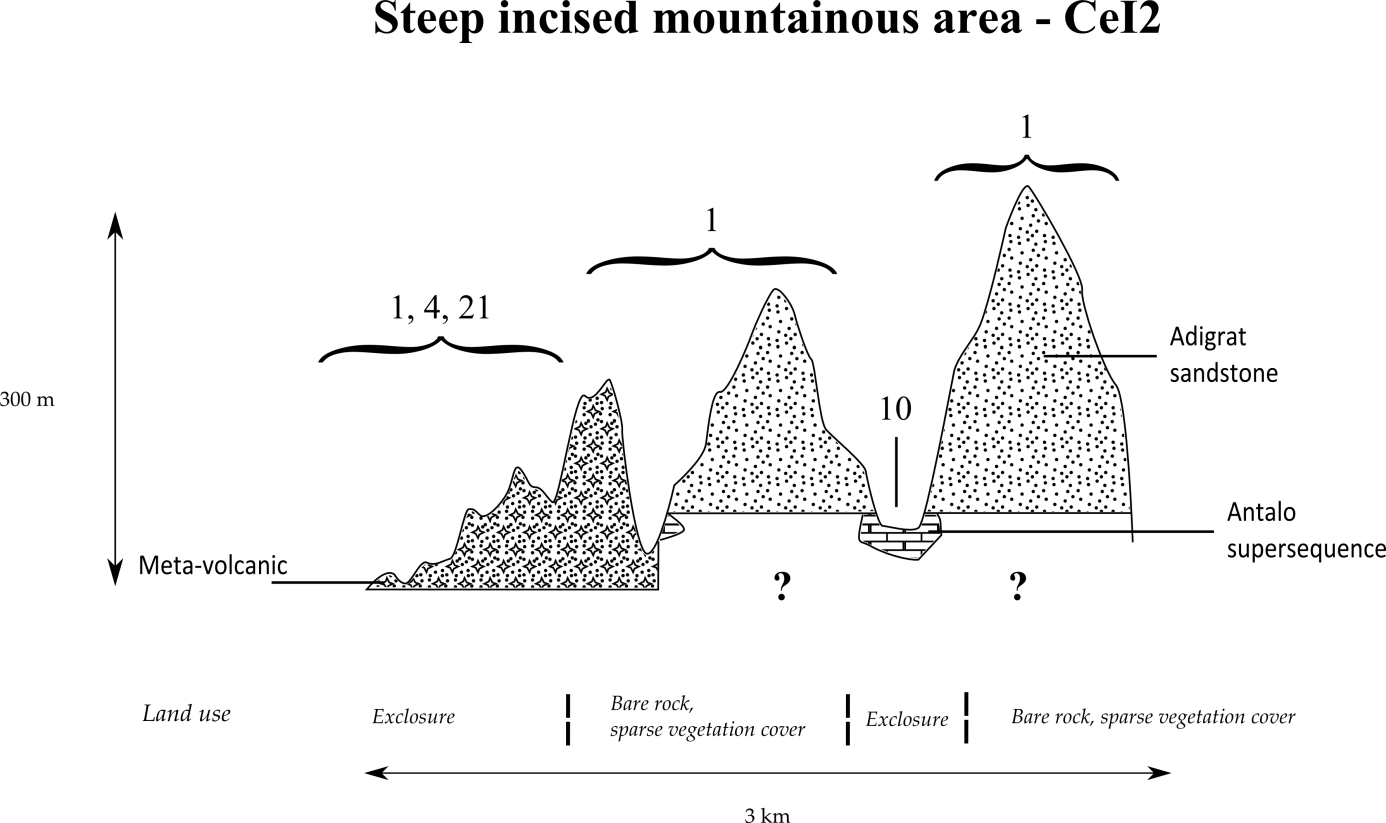
Typical catena in the steep incised mountainous area

- Associated soil types
  - complex of rock outcrops, very stony and very shallow soils ((Lithic) Leptosol) (1)
  - shallow, very stony, silt loamy to loamy soils (Skeletic Cambisol, Leptic Cambisol, Skeletic Regosol) (4)
- Inclusions
  - stony dark cracking clays with good natural fertility (Vertic Cambisol) (10)
  - shallow, stony loam soils with moderate fertility (Eutric Regosol and Cambisol) (21)

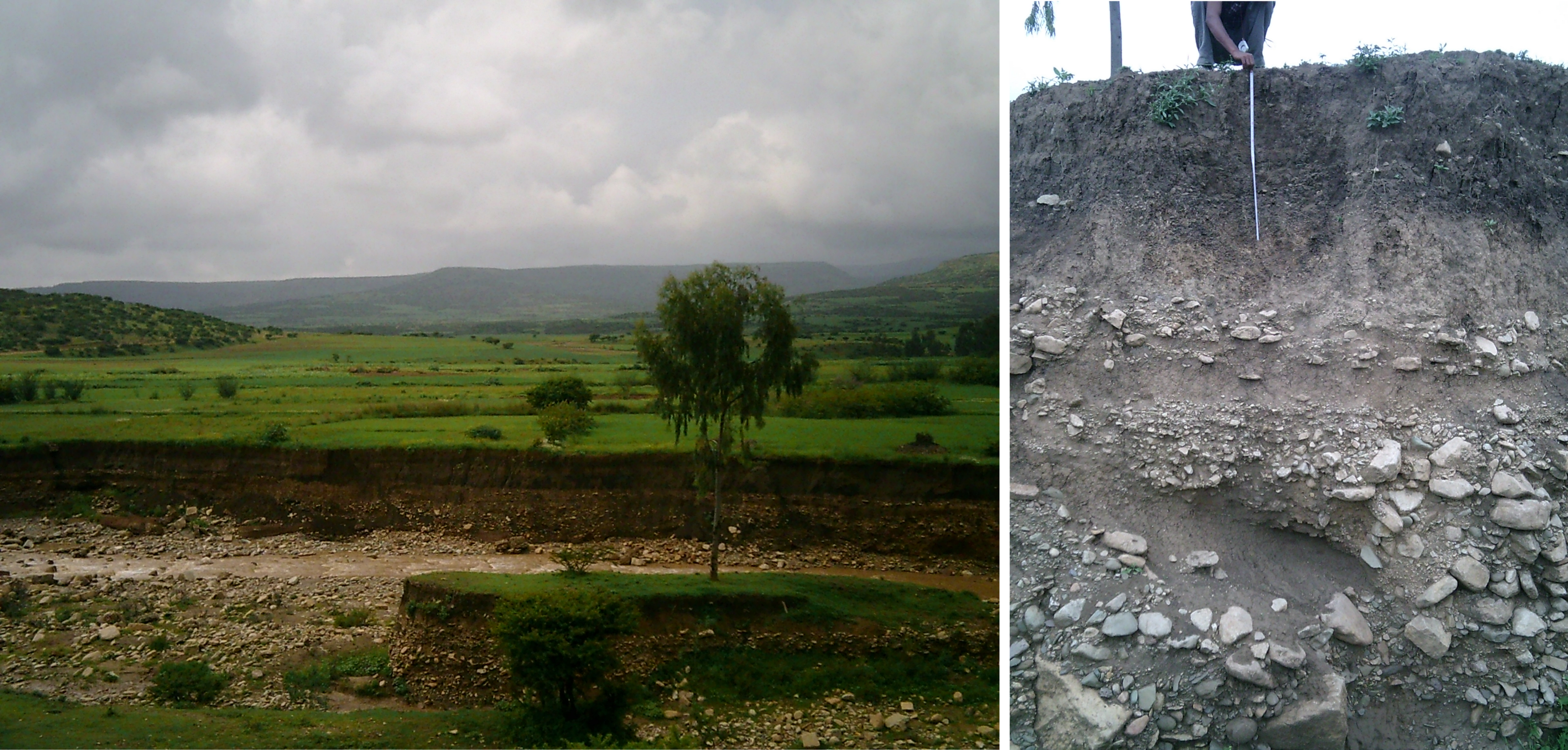
Mollic Calcaric Fluvisol along Agula'e River

=== Ancient river terraces ===
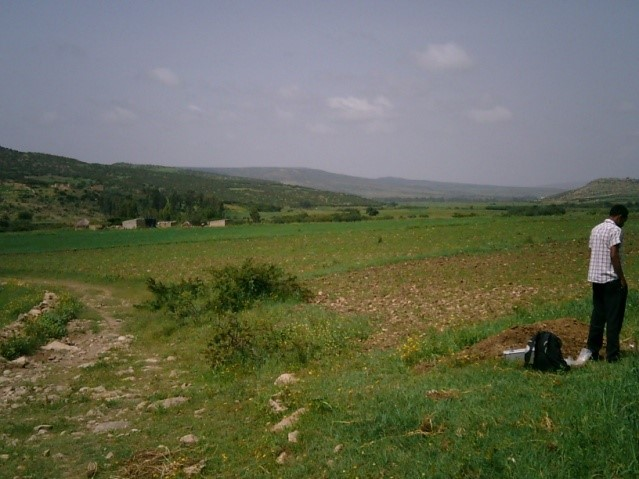
Surroundings of the Birki profile on a lower river terrace

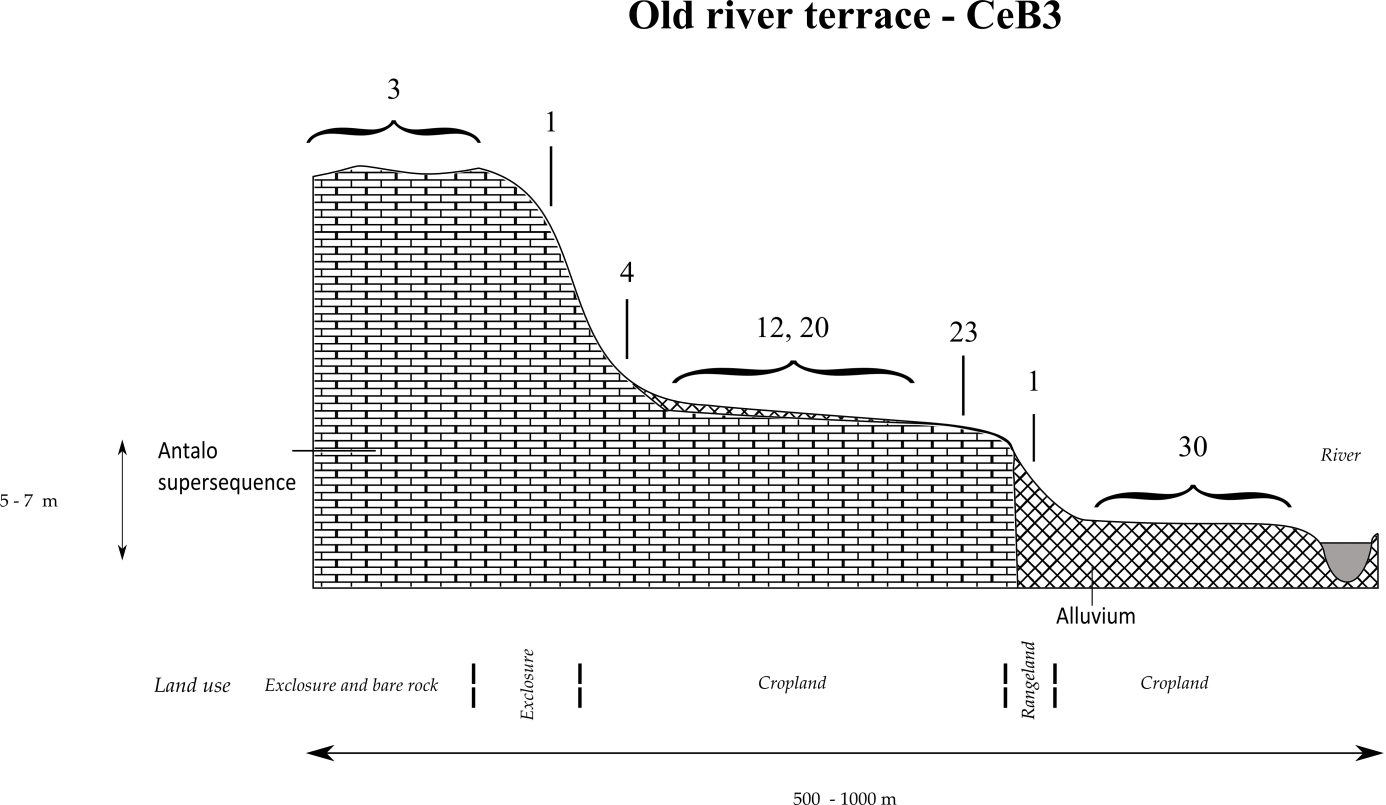
Typical catena on ancient river terraces

- Associated soil types
  - shallow, stony, dark, loamy soils on calcaric material (Rendzic Leptosol) (3)
  - Deep, dark cracking clays with good fertility, but problems of waterlogging (Chromic and Pellic Vertisol) (12)
  - moderately deep, red-brownish, loamy soils with a good natural fertility (Chromic Luvisol) (20)
  - Brown to dark, silty clay loams to loamy sands developed on alluvium, with good natural fertility (Fluvisol) (30)
- Inclusions
  - complex of rock outcrops, very stony and very shallow soils ((Lithic) Leptosol) (1)
  - shallow to very shallow, very stony, loamy soils (Skeletic/Leptic Cambisol and Regosol) (4)
  - shallow, dark, stony, loamy soils on calcaric material, rich on organic matter (Calcaric Mollic Cambisol) (23)

=== Alluvial plains induced by tufa dams ===
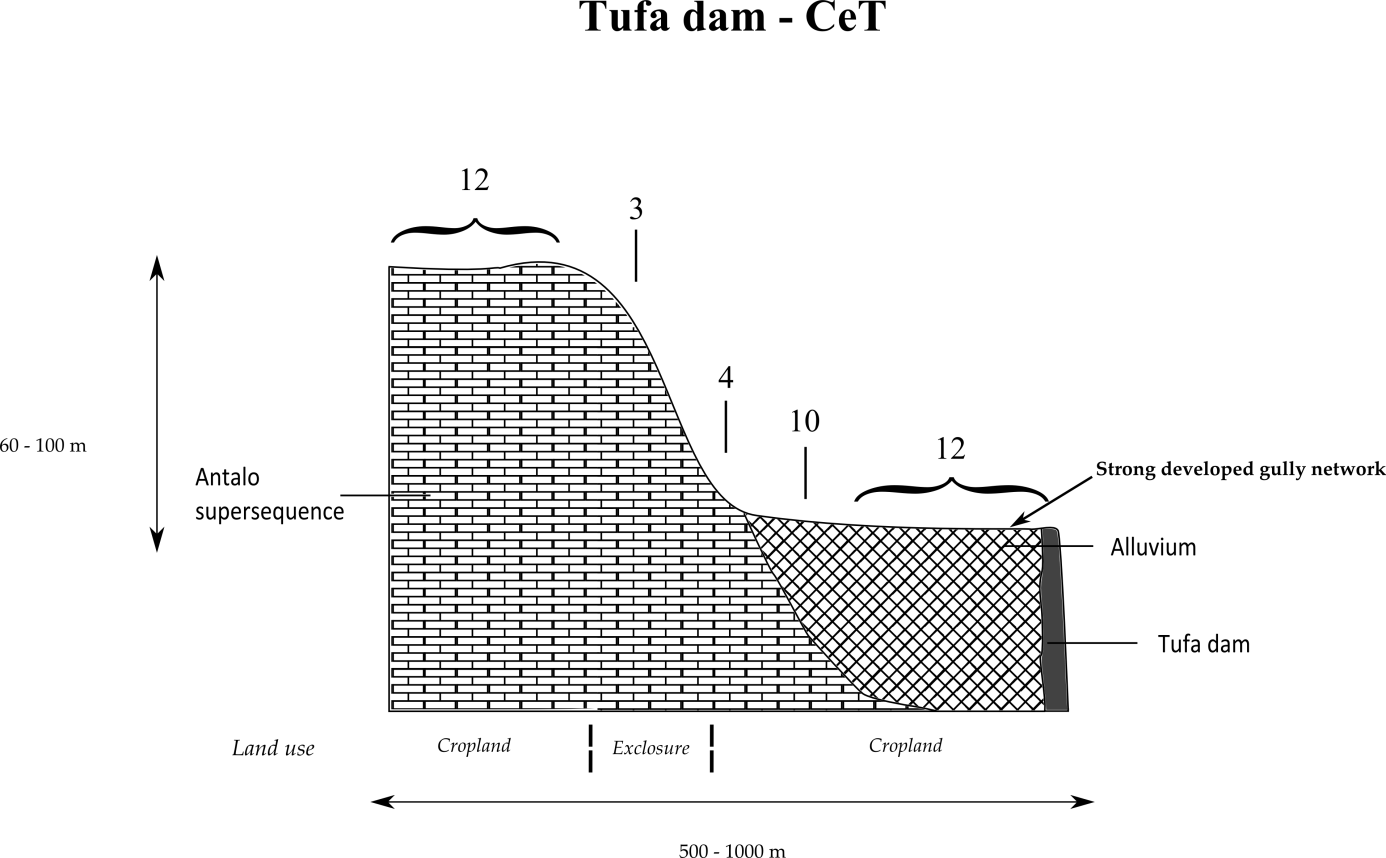
Typical catena on Tufa dam backfill

- Dominant soil type: deep dark cracking clays with very good natural fertility, waterlogged during the wet season (Chromic Vertisol, Pellic Vertisol) (12)
- Associated soil type: stony, dark cracking clays with good natural fertility (Vertic Cambisol) (10)
- Inclusions
  - shallow, stony, dark, loamy soils on calcaric material (Rendzic Leptosol) (3)
  - shallow, very stony, silt loamy to loamy soils (Skeletic Cambisol, Leptic Cambisol, Skeletic Regosol) (4)

=== Incised Agula Shale plateau ===
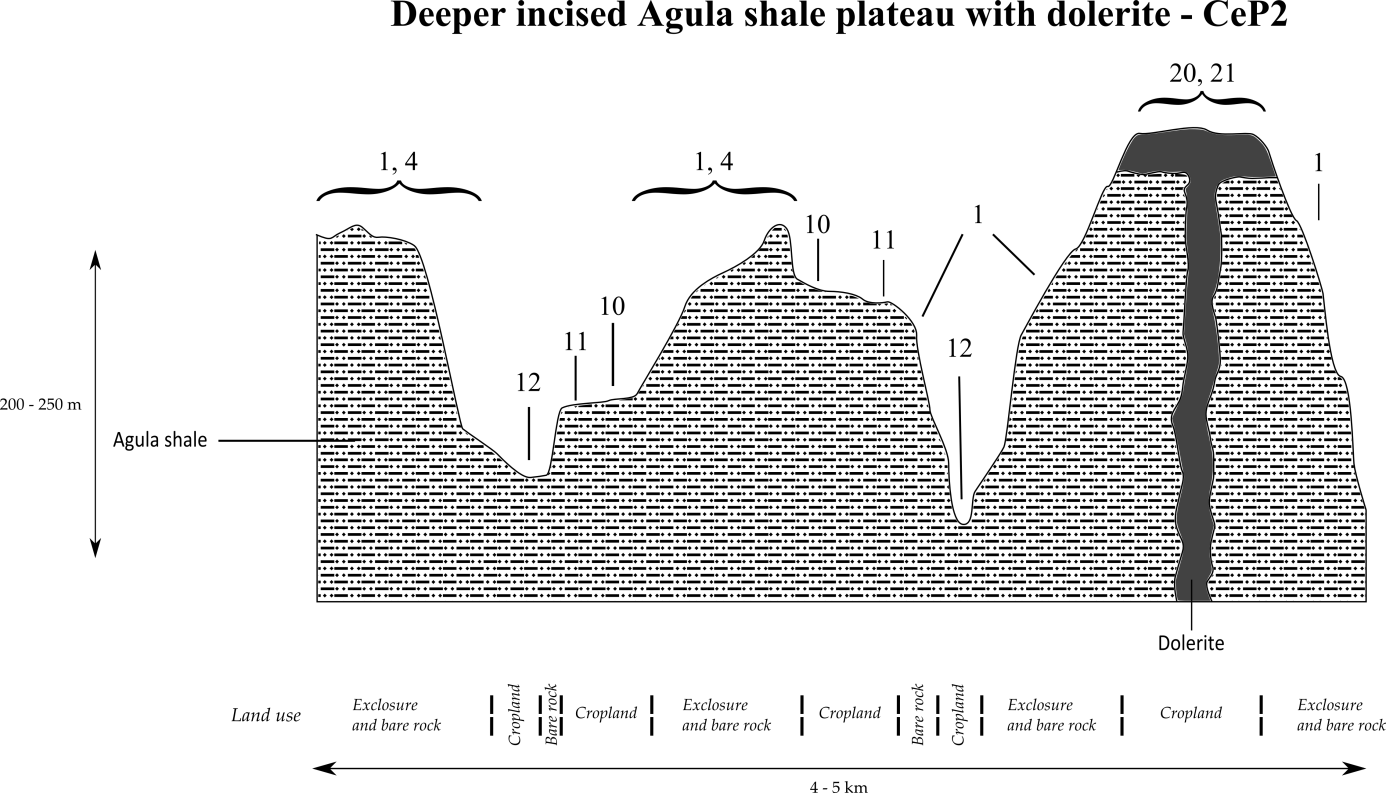
Typical catena on the incised Agula shale plateau with dolerite

- Associated soil types
  - complex of rock outcrops, very stony and very shallow soils ((Lithic) Leptosol) (1)
  - shallow, very stony, silt loamy to loamy soils (Skeletic Cambisol, Leptic Cambisol, Skeletic Regosol) (4)
  - moderately deep, red-brownish, loamy soils with a good natural fertility (Chromic Luvisol) (20)
- Inclusions
  - moderately deep dark stony clays with good natural fertility (Vertic Cambisol) (10)
  - deep, dark cracking clays on calcaric material (Calcaric Vertisol, Calcic Vertisol) (11)
  - deep dark cracking clays with very good natural fertility, waterlogged during the wet season (Chromic Vertisol, Pellic Vertisol) (12)
  - shallow, stony loam soils (Eutric Regosol and Cambisol) (21)

=== Gently rolling Antalo Limestone plateau, holding cliffs and valley bottoms ===
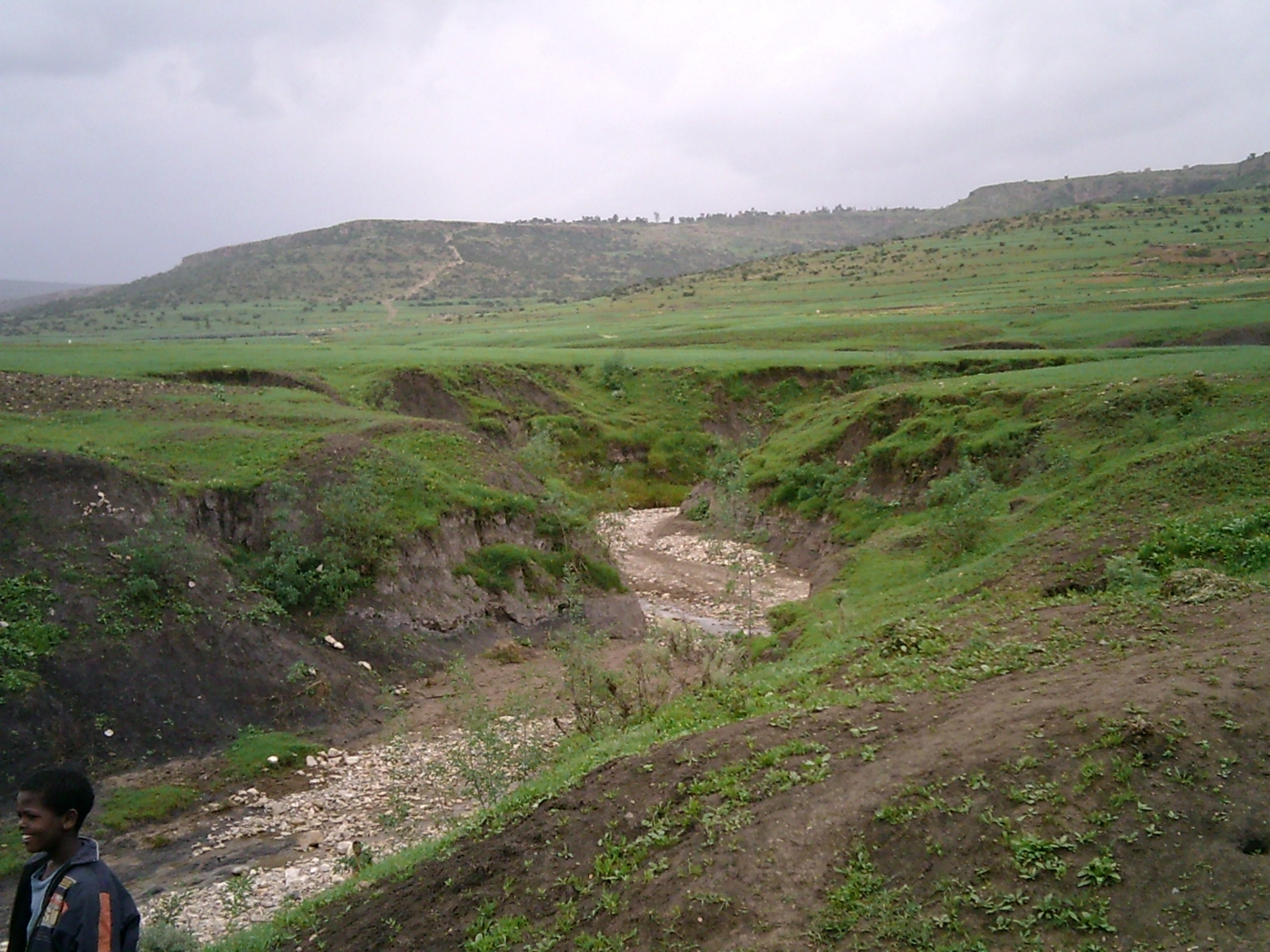
Landscape on the Antalo limestone plateau with a large gully incising Vertisols (between Wuqro and Agula)

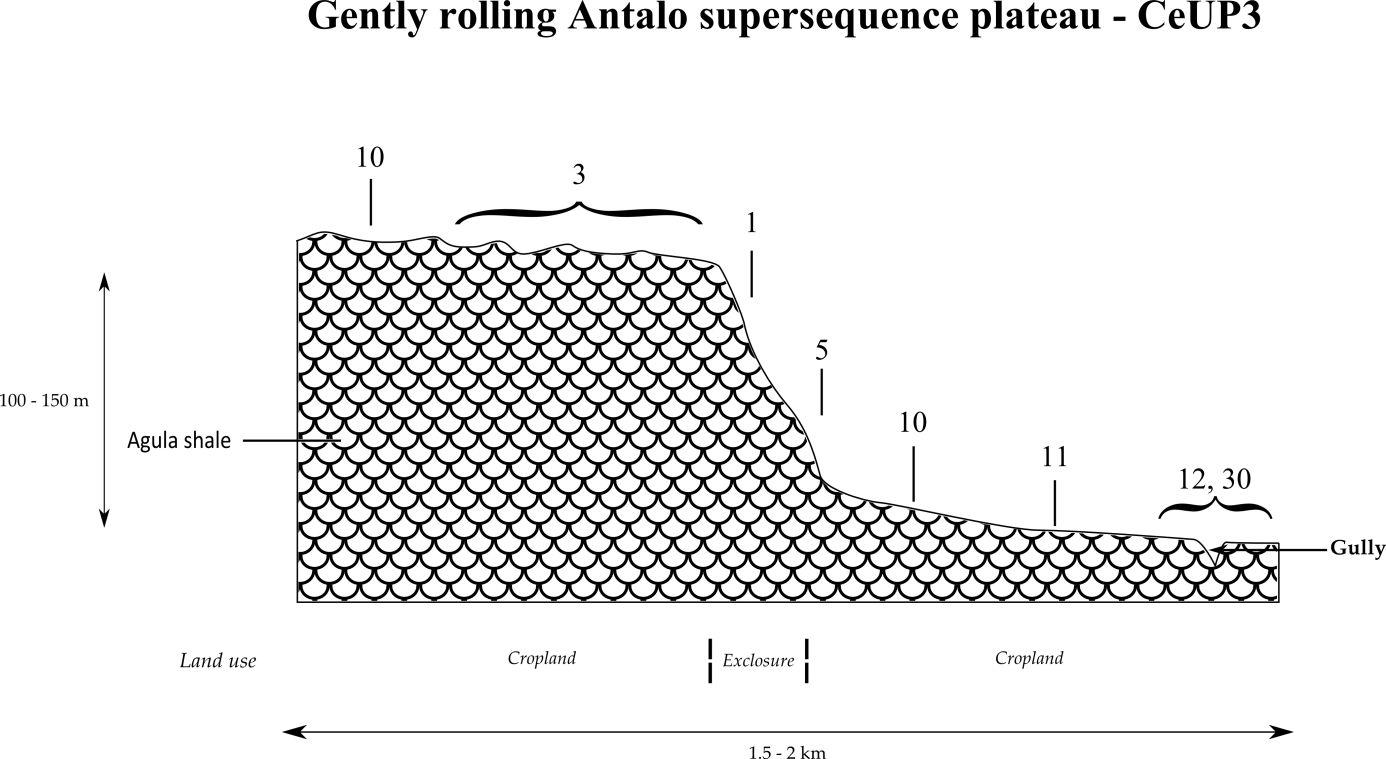
Typical catena in the gently rolling Antalo limestone plateau

- Associated soil types
  - shallow stony soils with a dark surface horizon overlying calcaric material (Calcaric Leptosol) (3)
  - moderately deep dark stony clays with good natural fertility (Vertic Cambisol) (10)
  - deep, dark cracking clays on calcaric material (Calcaric Vertisol, Calcic Vertisol) (11)
- Inclusions
  - Rock outcrops and very shallow soils (Lithic Leptosol) (1)
  - Shallow very stony loamy soil on limestone (Skeletic Calcaric Cambisol) (5)
  - Deep dark cracking clays with very good natural fertility, waterlogged during the wet season (Chromic Vertisol, Pellic Vertisol) (12)
  - Brown to dark sands and silt loams on alluvium (Vertic Fluvisol, Eutric Fluvisol, Haplic Fluvisol) (30)

=== Cuesta landscape ===
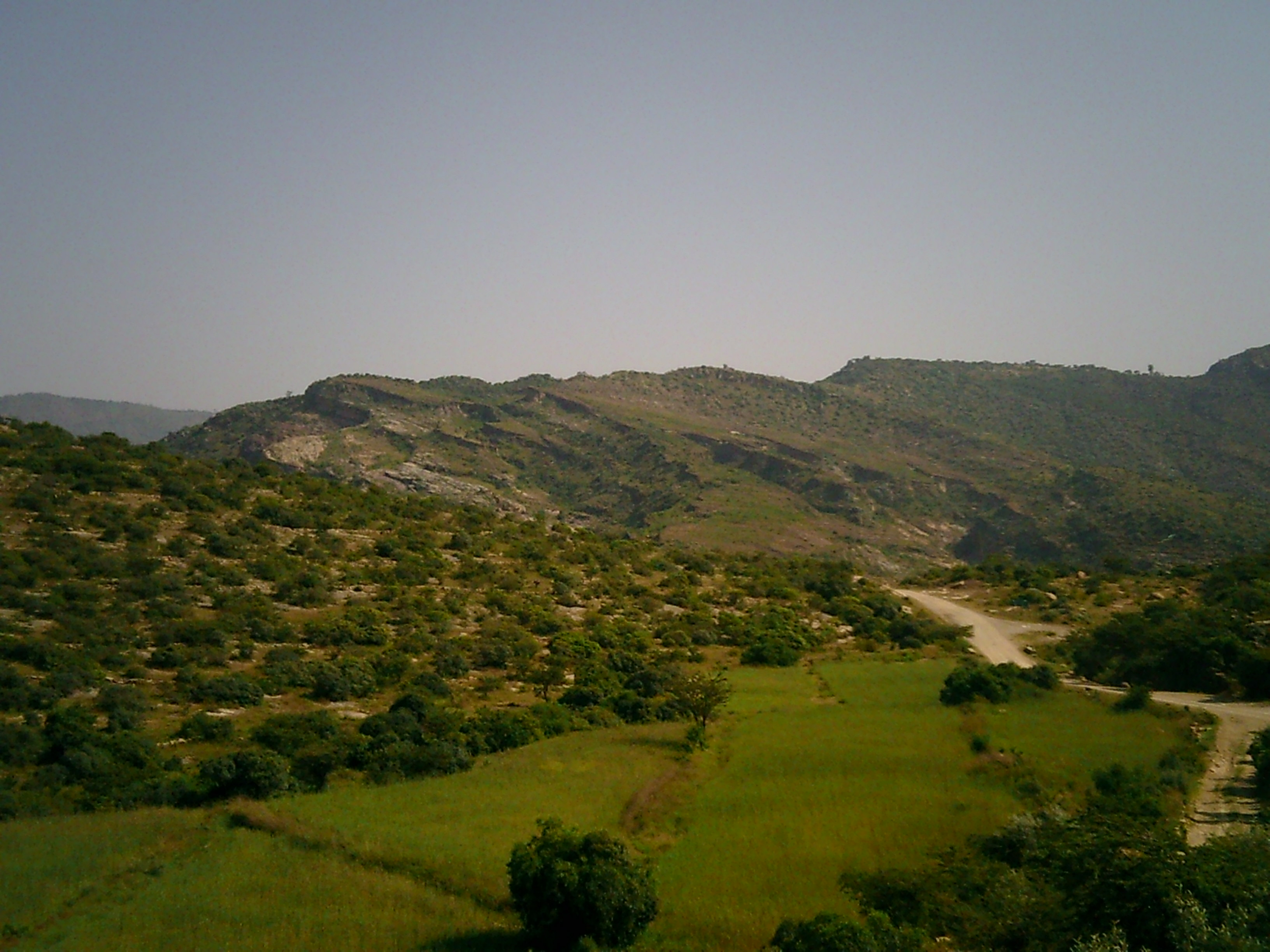
Cuesta landscape between Wuqro and Hawzien

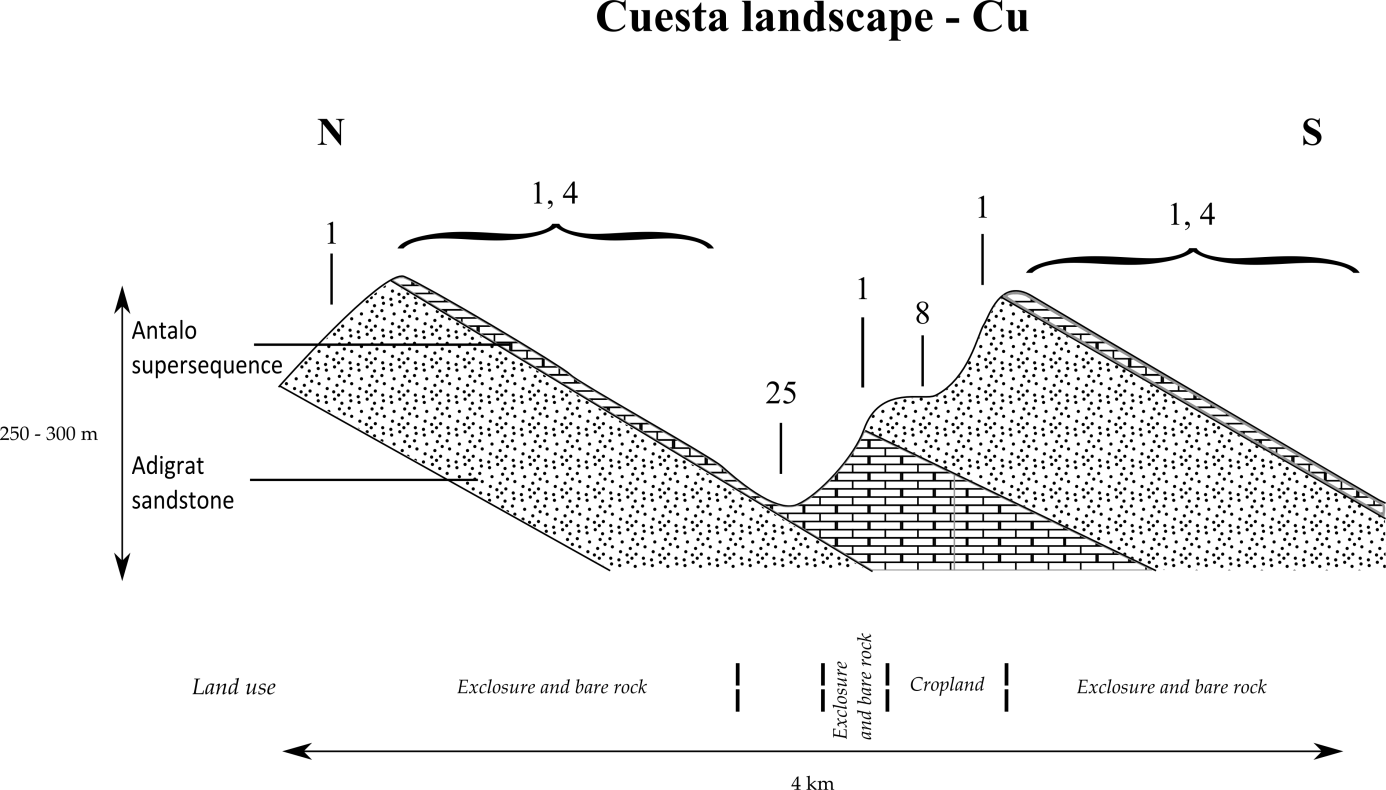
Typical catena in the cuesta landscape

- Dominant soil type: complex of rock outcrops, very stony and very shallow soils ((Lithic) Leptosol) (1)
- Associated soil type: shallow, very stony, silt loamy to loamy soils (Skeletic Cambisol, Leptic Cambisol, Skeletic Regosol) (4)
- Inclusions
  - shallow, stony, dry soils on colluvium (Colluvic Leptosol) (8)
  - shallow to moderately deep, stony, brown loamy soils on calcaric material (Calcic Cambisol and Luvisol) (25)

=== Atsaf and Menda'i plains ===
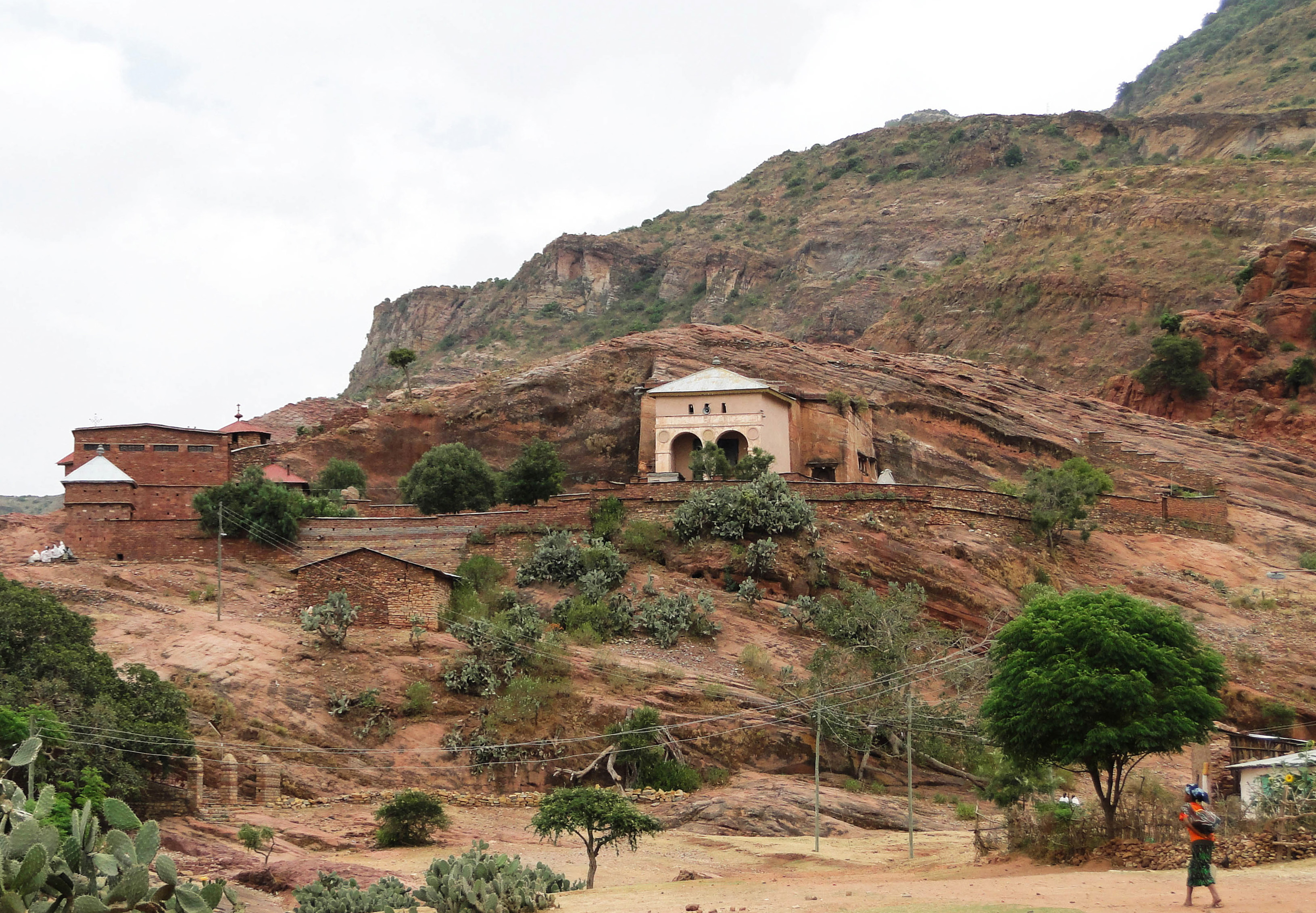
Lithic Leptosols around Abreha and Atsbeha church at the edge of Menda'i plain

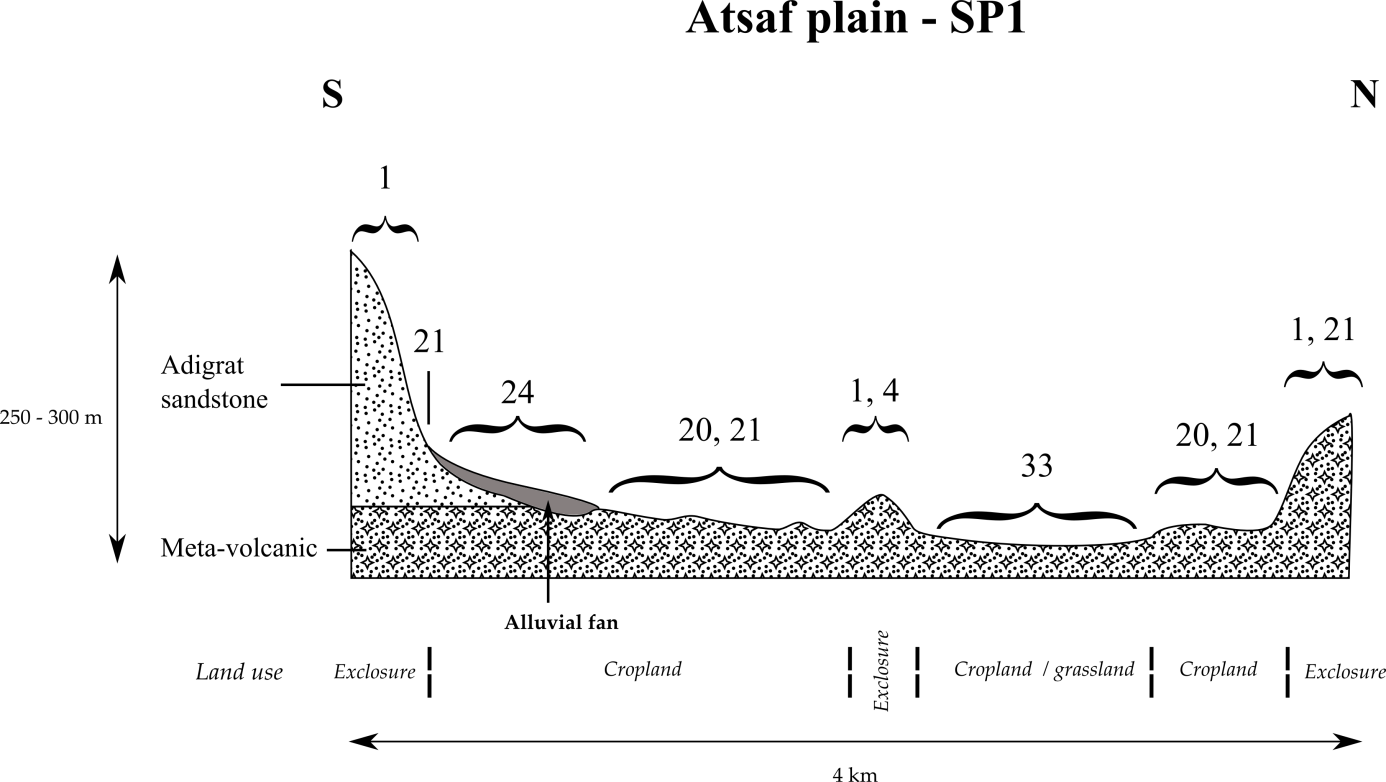
Typical catena in the Atsaf plain

- Associated soil types
  - moderately deep, red-brownish, loamy soils with a good natural fertility (Chromic Luvisol) (20)
  - shallow, stony loam soils with moderate fertility (Eutric Regosol and Cambisol) (21)
  - sandy clay loams to sands developed on sandy colluvium (Eutric Arenosol, Regosol, Cambisol) (24)
  - clays of floodplains with very high watertable with moderate to good natural fertility (Eutric Gleysol, Gleyic Cambisol) (33)
- Inclusions
  - complex of rock outcrops, very stony and very shallow soils ((Lithic) Leptosol) (1)
  - shallow, very stony, silt loamy to loamy soils (Skeletic Cambisol, Leptic Cambisol, Skeletic Regosol) (4)

=== Suluh plains with metavolcanic rocks ===
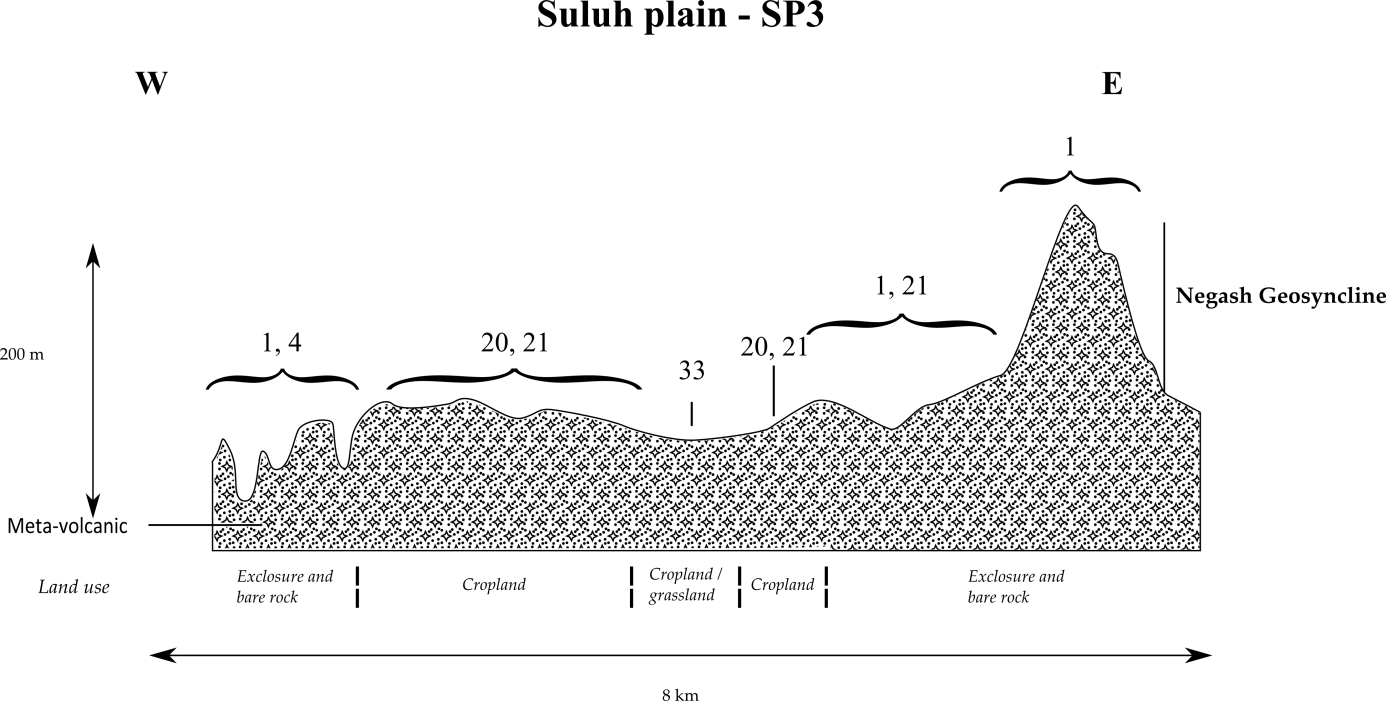
Typical catena in the Suluh plain

- Associated soil types
  - complex of rock outcrops, very stony and very shallow soils ((Lithic) Leptosol) (1)
  - moderately deep, red-brownish, loamy soils with a good natural fertility (Chromic Luvisol) (20)
  - shallow, stony loam soils (Eutric Regosol and Cambisol) (21)
- Inclusions
  - shallow, very stony, silt loamy to loamy soils (Skeletic Cambisol, Leptic Cambisol, Skeletic Regosol) (4)
  - clays of floodplains with very high watertable with moderate to good natural fertility (Eutric Gleysol, Gleyic Cambisol) (33)

=== Negash geosyncline ===
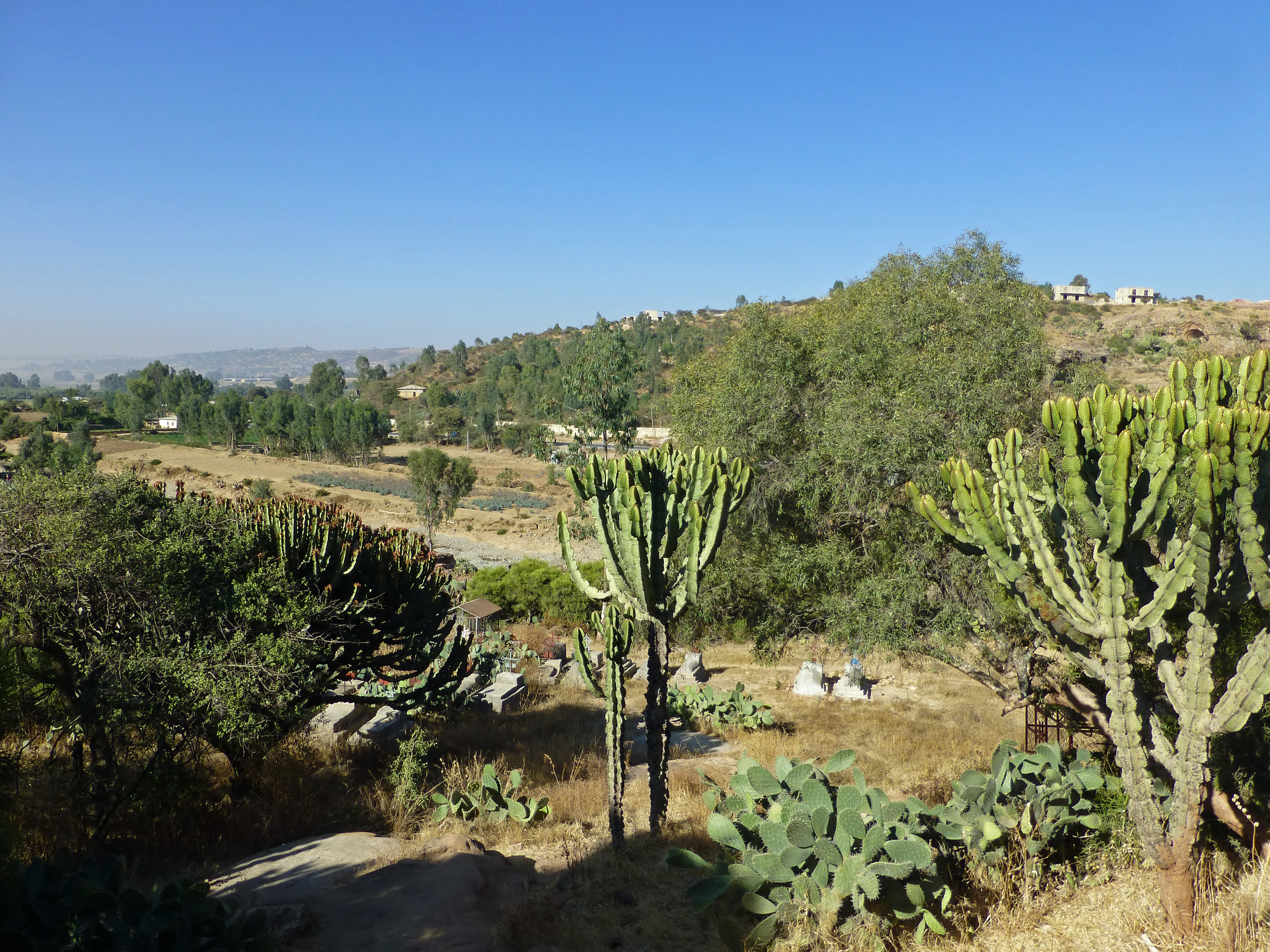
Landscape on Precambrian rock southeast of Negash

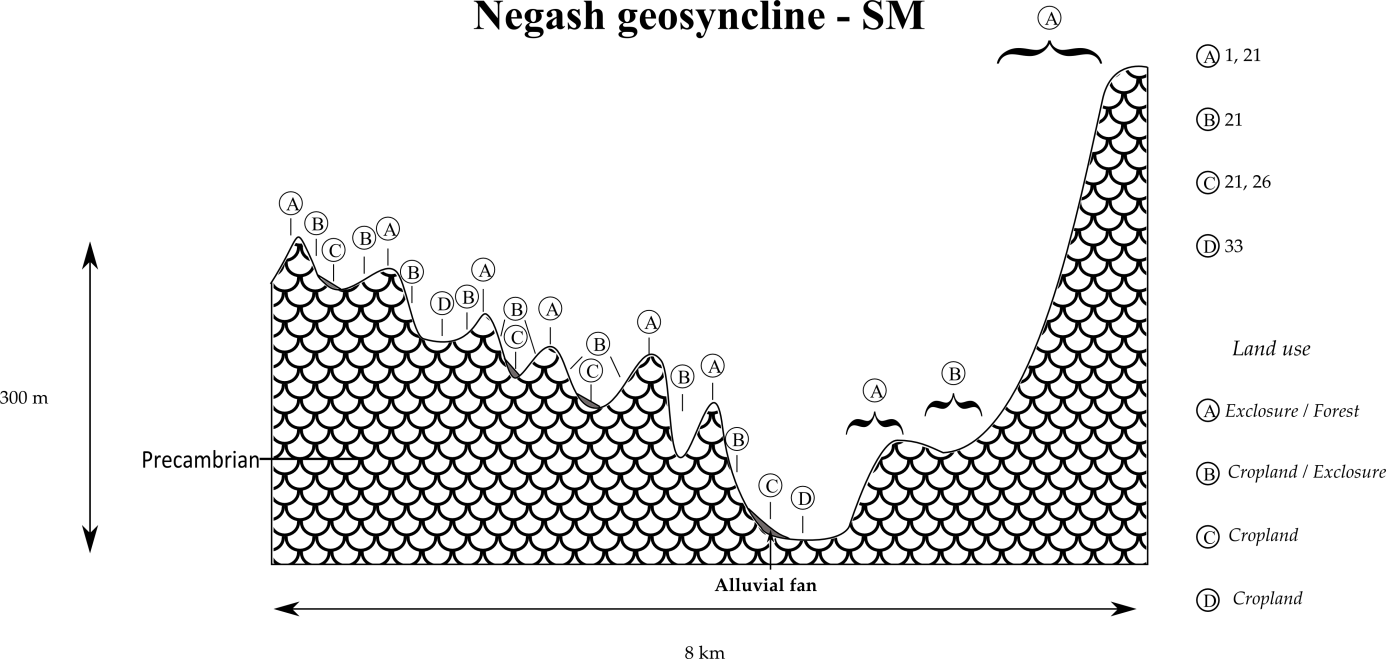
Typical catena in the Negash geosyncline

- Dominant soil type: shallow, stony loam soils (Eutric Regosol and Cambisol) (21)
- Associated soil types
  - complex of rock outcrops, very stony and very shallow soils ((Lithic) Leptosol) (1)
- Inclusions
  - moderately deep, brown loamy soils ((Eutric) Luvisol) (26)
  - clays of floodplains with very high watertable with moderate to good natural fertility (Eutric Gleysol, Gleyic Cambisol) (33)

=== Circular granite batholith (intrusive) ===
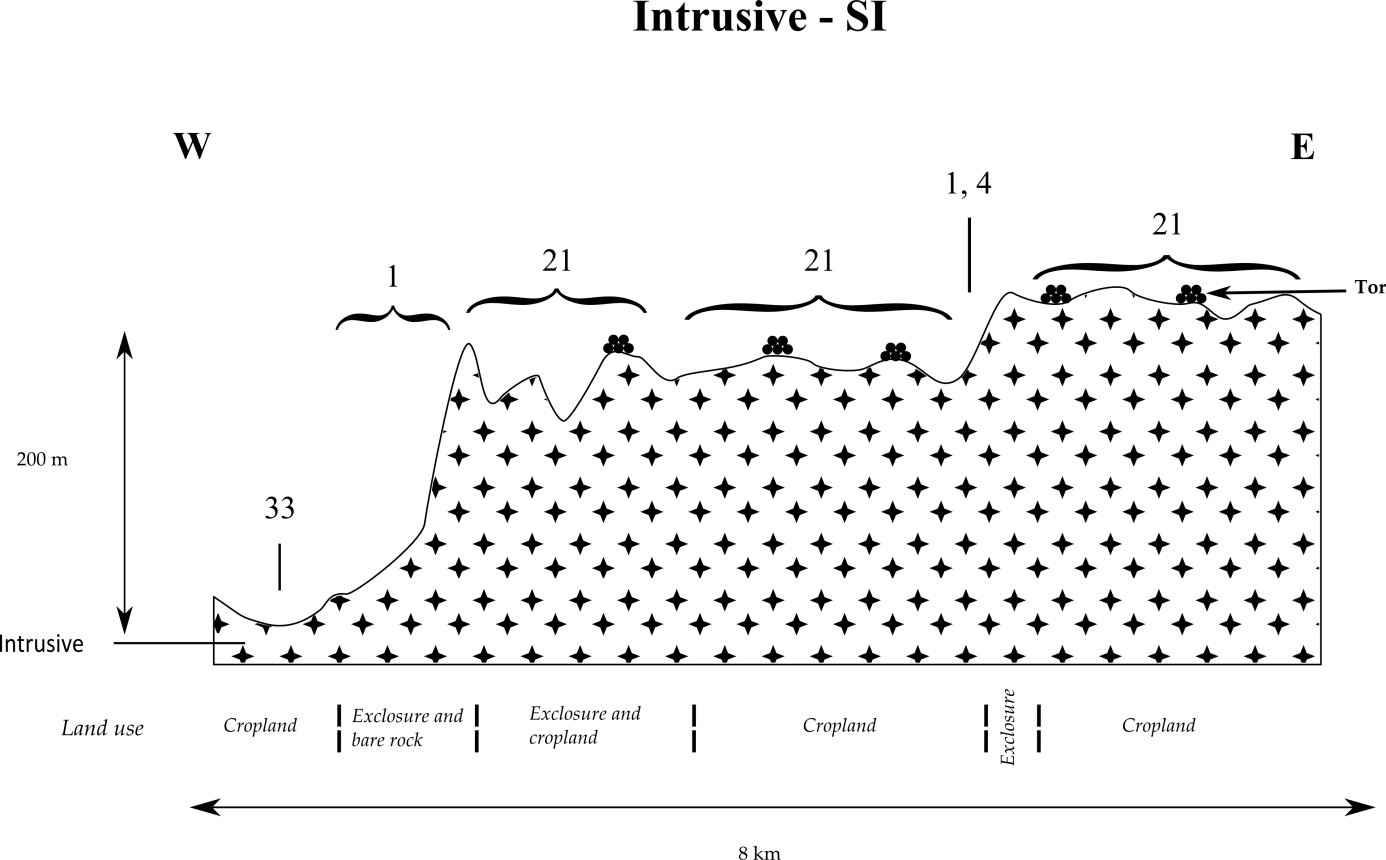
Typical catena on intrusive granite

- Dominant soil type: shallow, stony loam soils with moderate fertility (Eutric Regosol and Cambisol) (21)
- Associated soil type: complex of rock outcrops, very stony and very shallow soils ((Lithic) Leptosol) (1)
- Inclusions
  - shallow, very stony, silt loamy to loamy soils (Skeletic Cambisol, Leptic Cambisol, Skeletic Regosol) (4)
  - clays of floodplains with very high watertable with moderate to good natural fertility (Eutric Gleysol, Gleyic Cambisol) (33)

== Soil erosion and conservation ==
The reduced soil protection by vegetation cover, combined with steep slopes and erosive rainfall has led to excessive soil erosion. Nutrients and organic matter were lost and soil depth was reduced. Hence, soil erosion is an important problem, which results in low crop yields and biomass production. Given the strong degradation and thanks to the hard labour of many people in the villages, soil conservation is carried out on a large scale since the 1980s and especially 1980s; this has curbed rates of soil loss. Measures include the construction of infiltration trenches, stone bunds, check dams, small reservoirs such as La'ilay Wuqro and May Azaboy as well as a major biological measure: exclosures in order to allow forest regeneration. On the other hand, it remains difficult to convince farmers to carry out measures within the farmland (in situ soil management), such as bed and furrows or zero grazing, as there is a fear for loss of income from the land. Such techniques are however very effective.
