= St. Godehard's Rotunda, Strzelin =

Church in Strzelin, Poland

Coordinates: 50°46′53″N 17°04′24″E

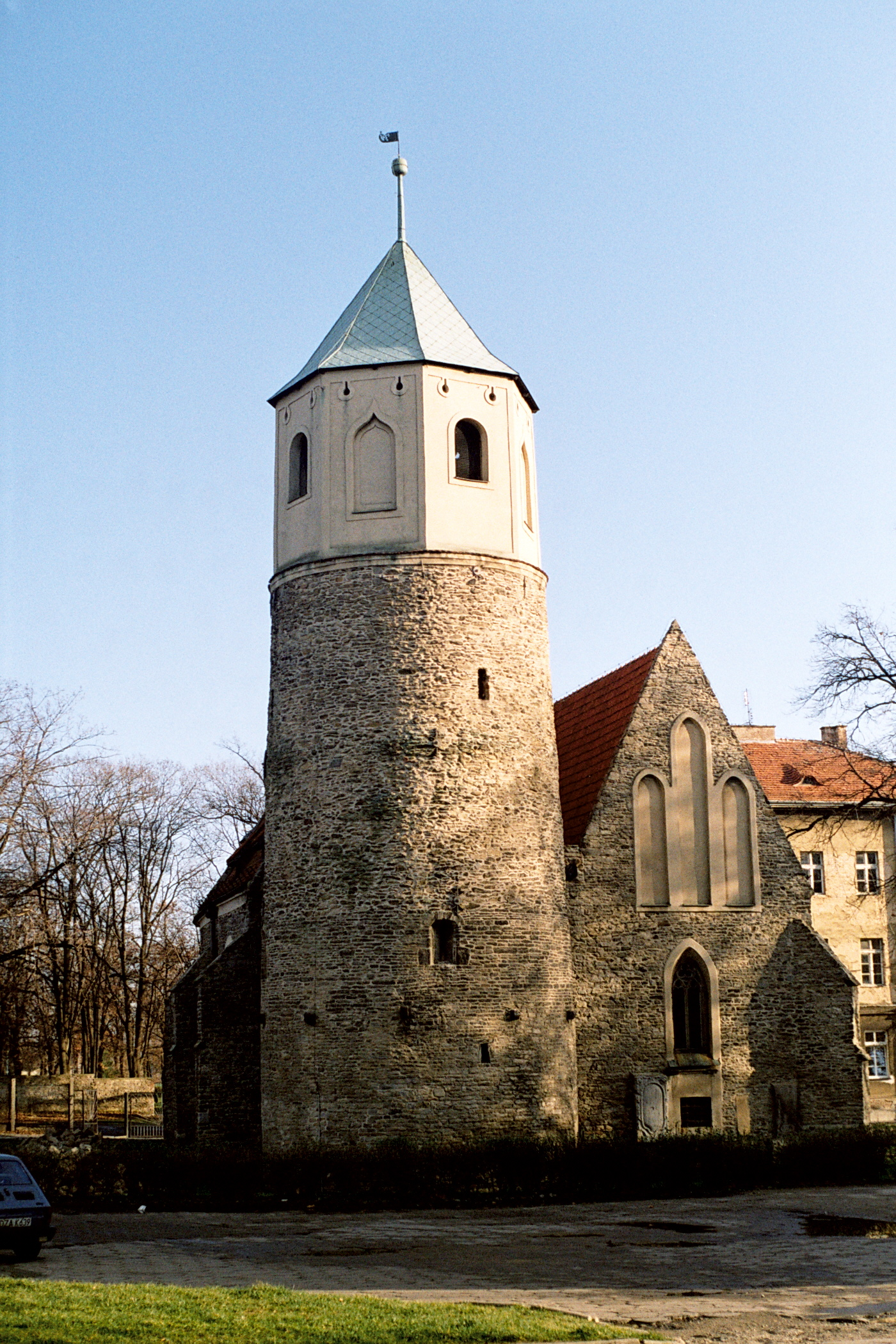
St. Godehard's Rotunda in Strzelin

St. Godehard's Rotunda (Polish: Rotunda św. Gotarda) in Strzelin is a Romanesque church founded in the 11th century and rebuilt in the 13th century.
