= Oławski Bridge =

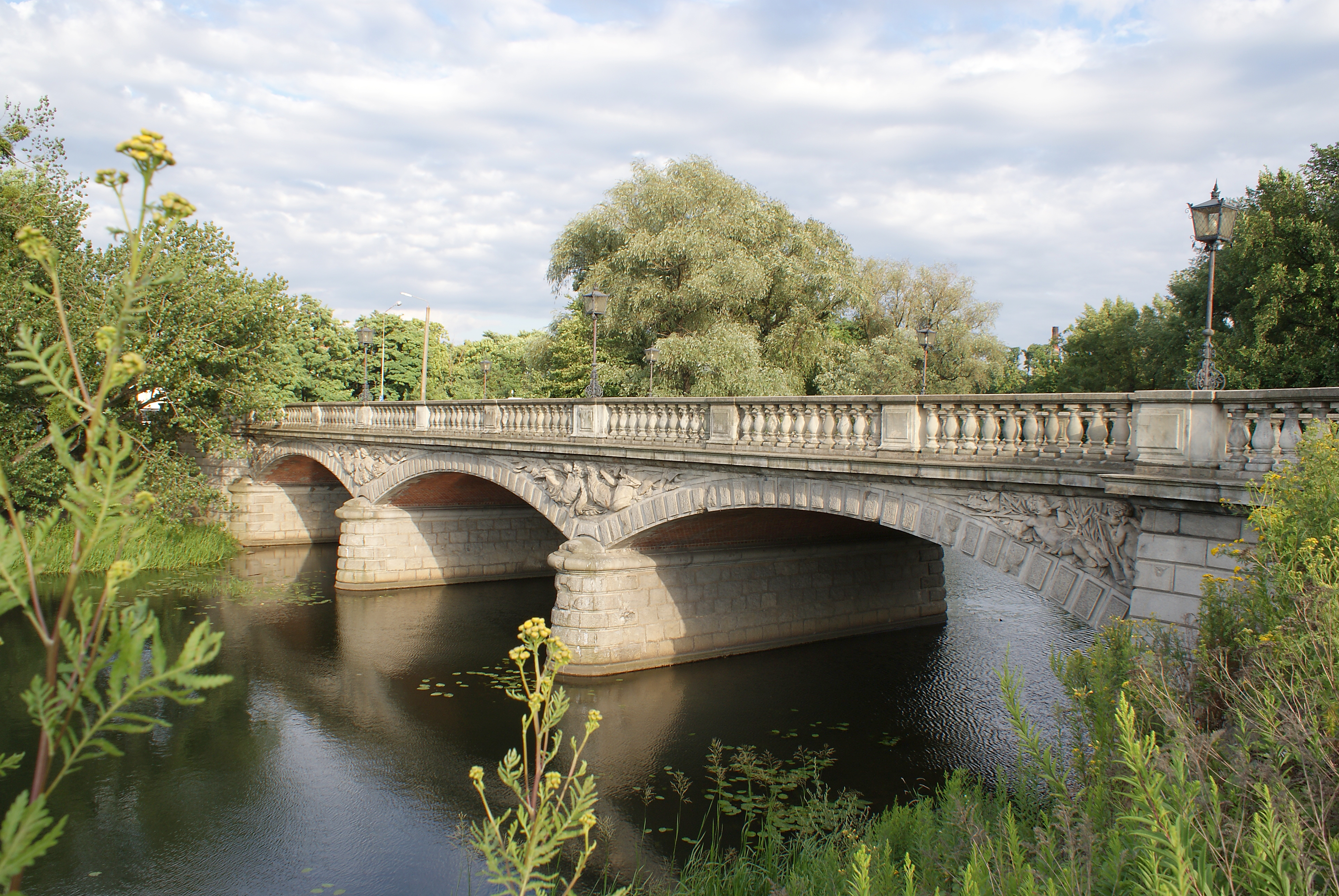
- Coordinates: 51°06′20″N 17°03′06″E
- Crosses: Oława

Characteristics
- Total length: 73.8 m (242.1 ft)
- Width: 14.12 m (46.3 ft)

History
- Opened: November 1883; 142 years ago

Location
- Interactive map of Oławski Bridge

Oławski Bridge (Polish: Most Oławski) is a road bridge over the Oława River in Wrocław, Poland. It was also known as Mauritius Brücke or Margarethenbrücke (German), St. Mauritius Bridge (English), and (cattle drive bridge). It was constructed during 1882–1883 and was designed by Alexander Kaumann, with assistance from Eger and Reichelt, Beer, Wackwitz and Hoffmann.

Before the construction of the Oławski Bridge, there was a footbridge that was used to drive cattle across the Oława, and for a time the bridge was called the Wygonowy Bridge (cattle drive bridge; Polish: Most Wygonowy).

The bridge is adorned with sculptural elements made by P. Heisler under the direction of Robert Toberentza and in collaboration with Heinrich Weltringa. The metal decorative elements were made by Gustav Trelenberg. In 1962 and 1990 the bridge was completely renovated.

The bridge is constructed using brick arches and supports, covered with stone blocks (blows) decorated with a hammered texture. The railings are ornate, with baluster elements modeled on the iconography of Baroque architecture. The total length of the bridge is 73.8 meters (242 feet), and its total width is 14.12 meters (46 feet). The roadway surface on the bridge is made of granite blocks. Before World War II, a tram line ran across the bridge; it was removed during renovation of the track.
