= Wrocław Plain =

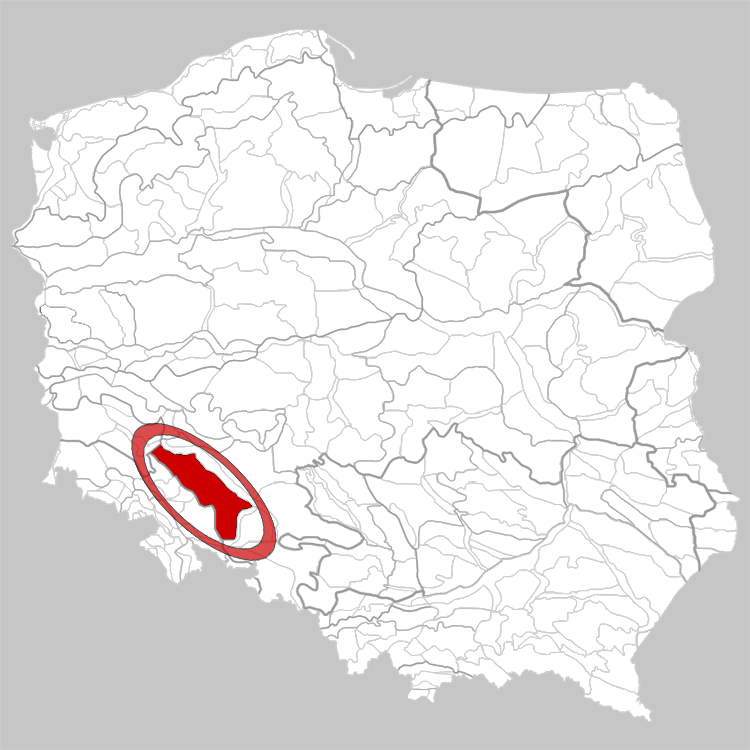
Wrocław Plain in Poland

Wrocław Plain (Polish: Równina Wrocławska) is a mesoregion in the Silesian Lowlands, Poland. It stretches between the Wroclaw Proglacial Valley and the Sudeten Foreland. From the southeast, it is limited by the valley of the Kłodzko Nysa. It is divided into three parts (micro-regions): the Środa Heights in the northwest, the Kącka Plain in the center, and the Grodków Plain in the southeast. Its area is about 2430 km².

Geologically, it is an area of the Pre-Sudetic Block, the Silesian-Kraków Monocline, and the Pre-Sudetic Monocline, covered by Pleistocene and Holocene sediments like clays, sands, gravels, loams, and loess.

It is a predominantly fertile agricultural land developed on fertile humus soils created on loess formations.

The largest towns are Grodków, Kąty Wrocławskie, Strzelin, Środa Śląska, Wiązów, and Wrocław.
