= Lipniki, Opole Voivodeship =

Lipniki
- Village
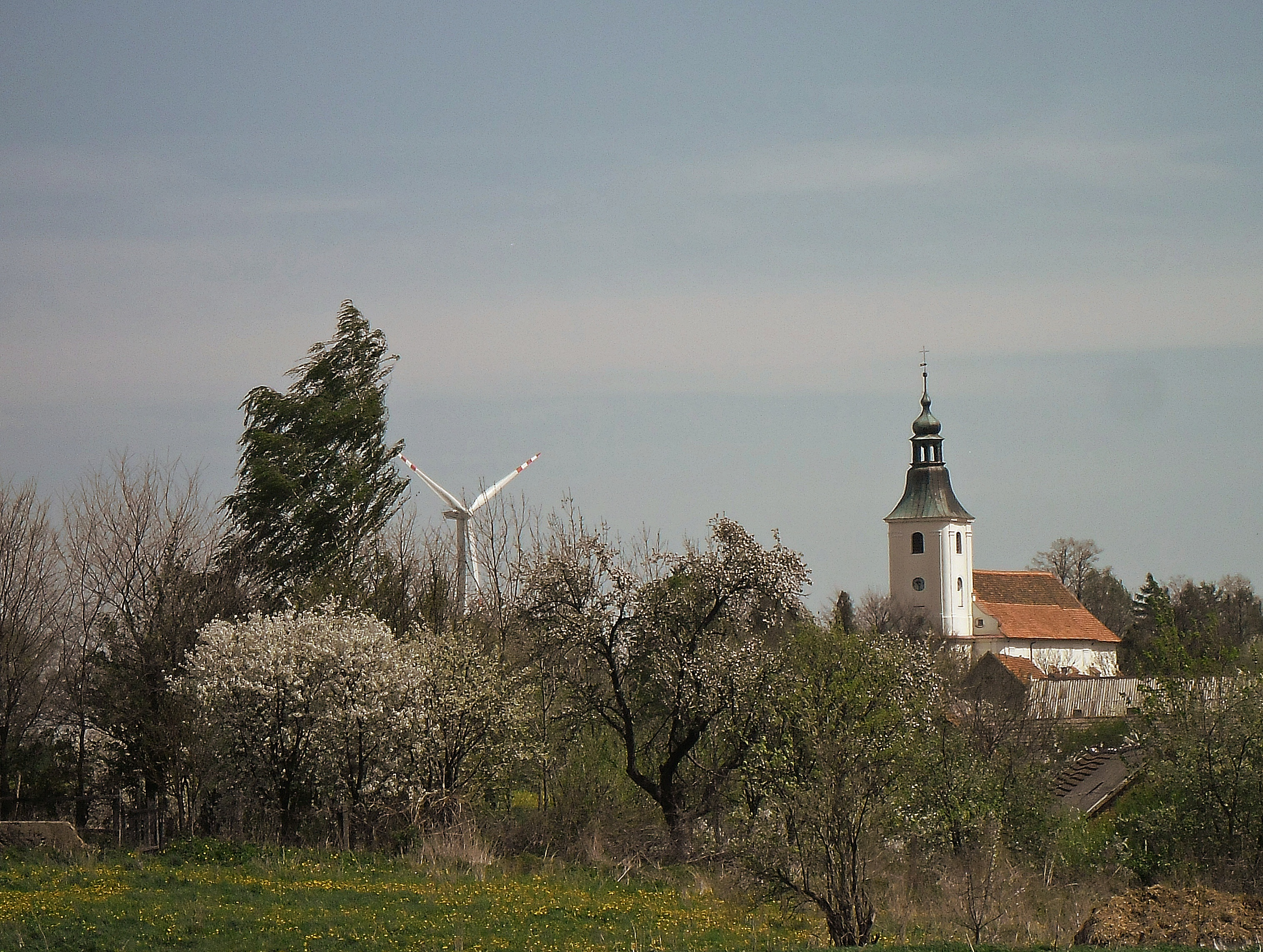
- Church of Saint Martin

- Location within Poland
- Coordinates: 50°32′28″N 17°5′30″E
- Country: Poland
- Voivodeship: Opole
- County: Nysa
- Gmina: Kamiennik

Population
  - Total: 650

Lipniki (Polish: [lipˈɲikʲi]; German: Lindenau) is a village in the administrative district of Gmina Kamiennik, within Nysa County, Opole Voivodeship, in south-western Poland.
