= Oława (river) =

River in Poland

Oława German: Ohle
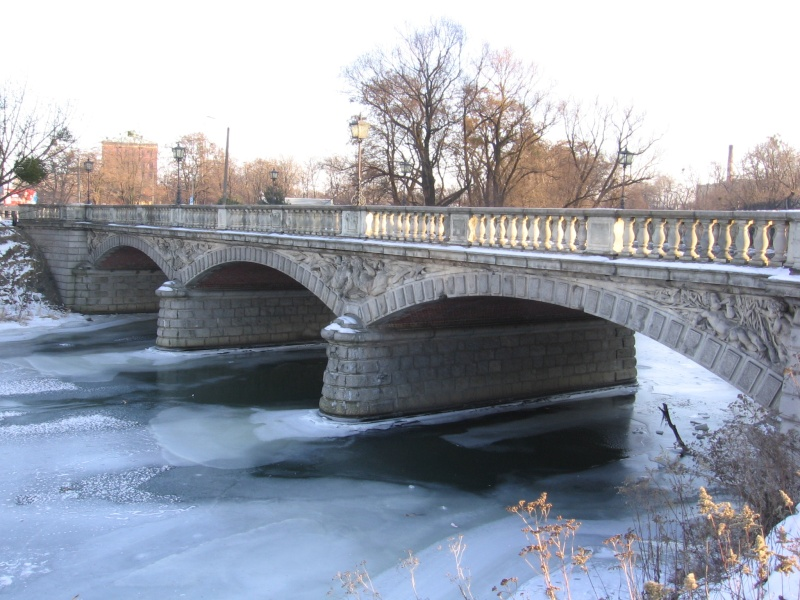
- Oławski Bridge in Wrocław

Location
- Country: Poland

Physical characteristics
- Source
  - location: Lipniki
  - elevation: 315 m
- Mouth: Oder
  - location: Wrocław
  - coordinates: 51°06′30″N 17°03′10″E
  - elevation: 115 m
- Length: 99 km
- Basin size: 1167 km^{2}

Basin features
- Progression: Oder→ Baltic Sea

The Oława (German: Ohle; Silesian: Ôława) is a river in Poland and a left-bank tributary of the Oder River, 99.01 km long with a catchment area of 1167.4 km^{2}.

== Sources ==
The river starts at an altitude of approximately 315 m above sea level in the Sudety Foreland above Lipniki in the Kamiennik Gmina. Apart from the source section, it flows through urbanized and industrialized areas. It flows through Ziębice, Strzelin, Wiązów, Oława, Siechnice and finally Wrocław, where it joins the Oder at 250.4 km of its course.

The hydrography of the Olawa River is quite well developed. The river has no major tributaries except Krynka and Gnojna. The Oława is of particular importance in the provincial monitoring network due to the fact that it supplies water to Wrocław. In the lower section (mainly below the mouth of the Psarski Channel) the river is used for canoeing.

== See also ==
- List of rivers of Germany
- List of rivers of Poland
