= Fluvisol =

Soil type

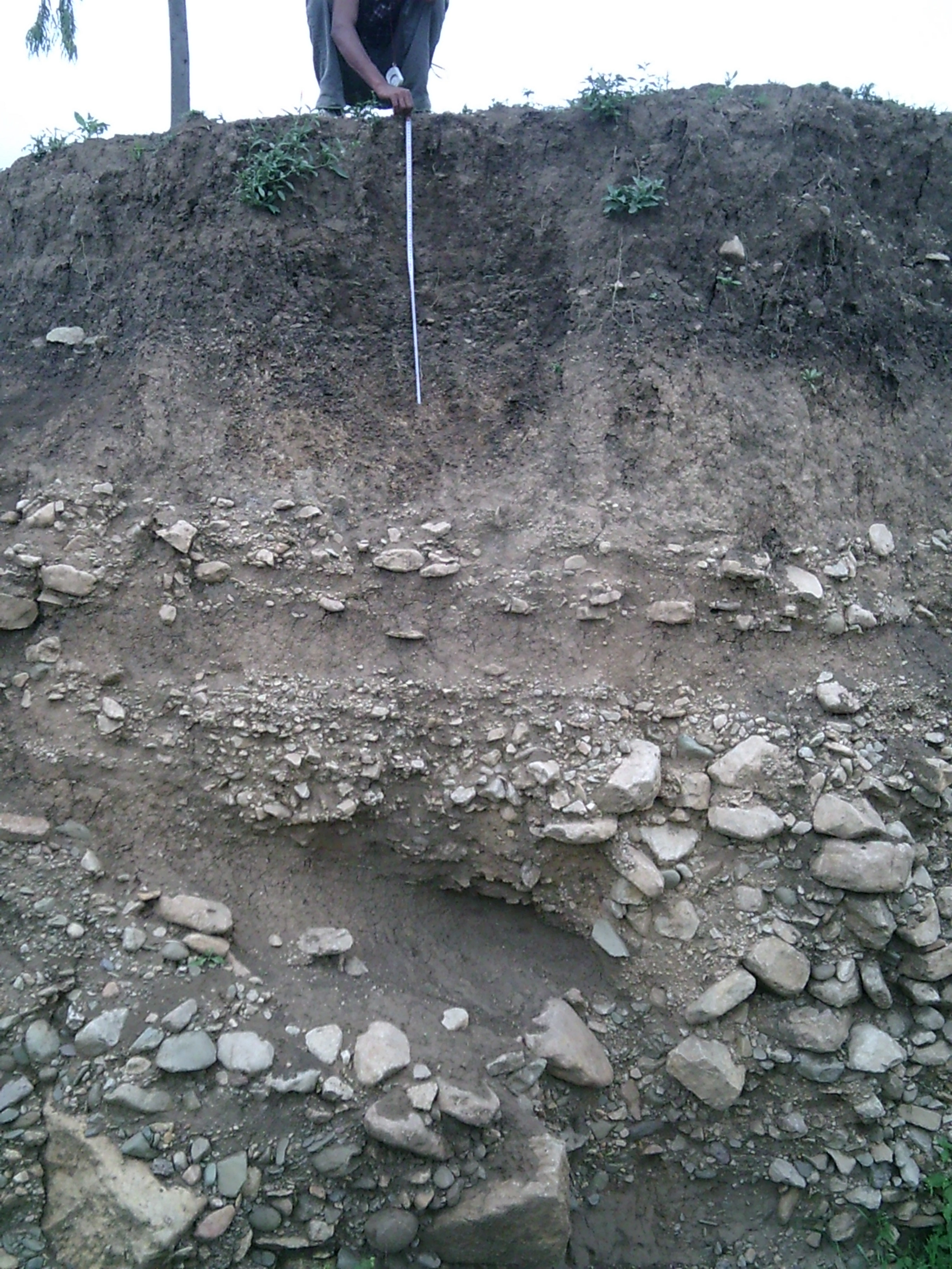
Fluvisol profile along Agula'e River, Ethiopia

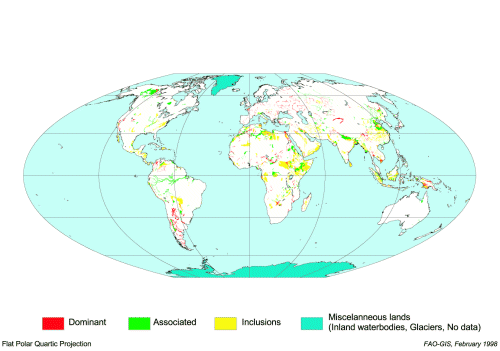
Distribution of Fluvisols

A fluvisol in the World Reference Base for Soil Resources (WRB) is a genetically young soil in alluvial deposits . Apart from river sediments, they also occur in lacustrine and marine deposits. Fluvisols correlate with fluvents and fluvaquents of the USDA soil taxonomy. The good natural fertility of most fluvisols and their attractive dwelling sites on river levees and higher parts in marine landscapes were recognized in prehistoric times.

Fluvisols are found on alluvial plains, river fans, valleys and tidal marshes on all continents and in all climate zones. Under natural conditions periodical flooding is fairly common. The soils have a clear evidence of stratification. Soil horizons are weakly developed, but a distinct topsoil horizon (but no mollic or umbric horizon) may be present.

Many dryland crops are grown on fluvisols, normally with some form of water control. On tropical Fluvisols with satisfactory irrigation and drainage paddy rice cultivation is widespread.

Some coastal lowlands have fluvisols with sulphidic material within the profile (a thionic horizon). These acid sulfate soils have severe constraints for agricultural use as low pH-values, toxic aluminium levels and high concentrations of salts. Tidal lands that are strongly saline are best kept under mangroves or some other salt-vegetation.

Major concentrations of fluvisols are found along rivers and lakes, e.g. in the Amazon Basin, the Ganges Plain of India, the plains near Lake Chad in Central Africa, and the marshlands of Brazil, Paraguay and northern Argentina. Also in deltaic areas, e.g. the deltas of the Ganges–Brahmaputra, Indus, Mekong, Mississippi, Nile, Niger, Orinoco, Po, Rhine, Rio de la Plata, and Zambezi. Furthermore in areas of recent marine deposits, e.g. the coastal lowlands of Sumatra, Kalimantan, Irian Jaya and Papua New Guinea.

Acid sulfate soils are found in the coastal lowlands of Southeast Asia, West Africa and along the northeast coast of South America (French Guiana, Guyana, Suriname and Venezuela).

== See also ==
- Pedogenesis
- Pedology (soil study)
- Soil classification
