= Strzelin =

Town in Lower Silesian Voivodeship, Poland

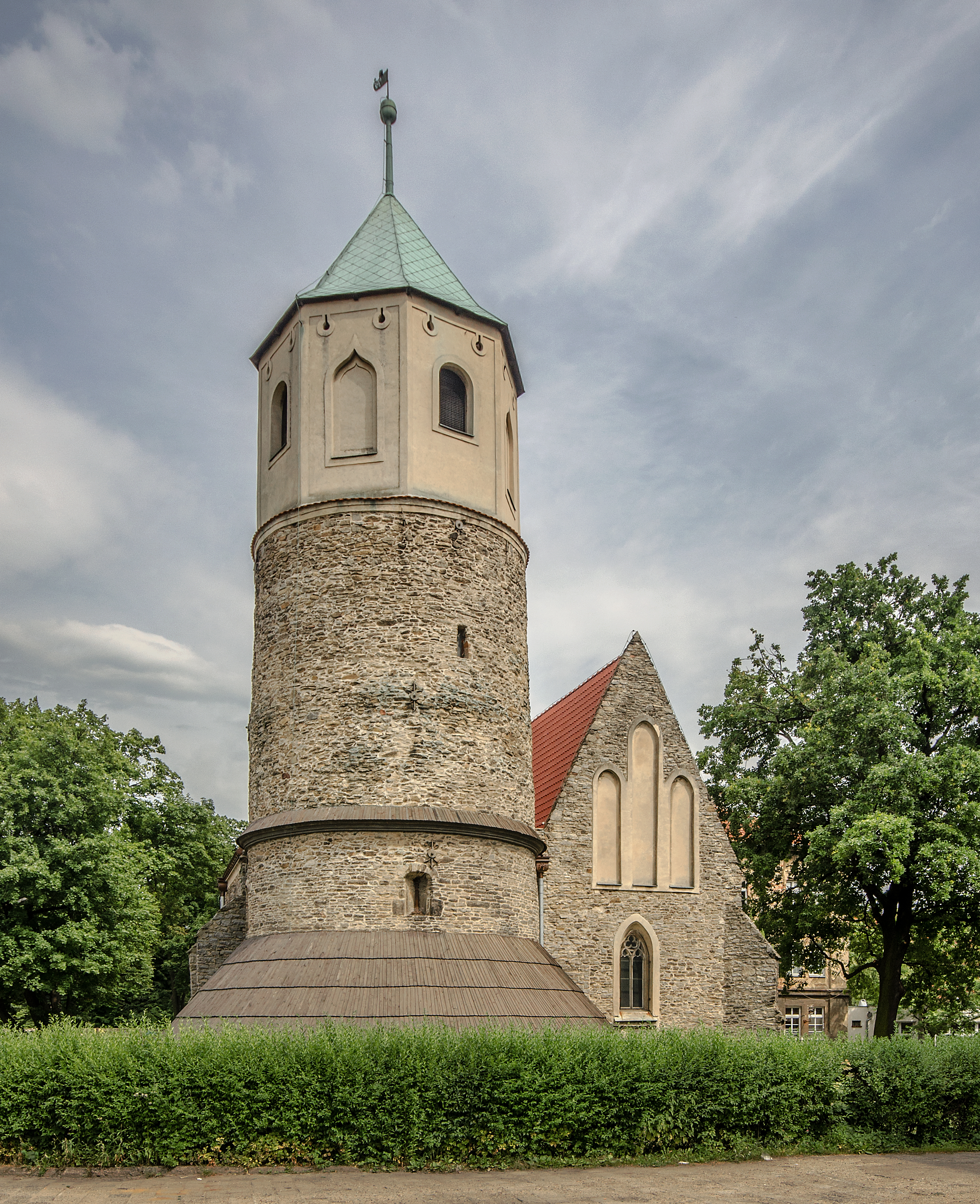
- St. Godehard's Rotunda, Strzelin

- Flag Coat of arms

- Location within Poland
- Coordinates: 50°47′N 17°4′E
- Country: Poland
- Voivodeship: Lower Silesian
- County: Strzelin
- Gmina: Strzelin
- Town rights: 1292

Government
  - Mayor: Dorota Pawnuk

Area
  - Total: 10.34 km^{2} (3.99 sq mi)

Population (2019-06-30)
  - Total: 12,460
  - Density: 1,205/km^{2} (3,121/sq mi)
- Time zone: UTC+1 (CET)
  - Summer (DST): UTC+2 (CEST)
- Postal code: 57-100
- Car plates: DST
- Website: http://www.strzelin.pl

Strzelin (Polish pronunciation: [ˈstʂɛlʲin]; German: Strehlen, Czech: Střelín) is a town in Lower Silesian Voivodeship in south-western Poland. It is located on the Oława river, a tributary of the Oder, about 39 kilometres (24 miles) south of the region's capital Wrocław. It is part of the Wrocław metropolitan area.

The town is the seat of Strzelin County and also of the smaller municipality (gmina) of Strzelin. It is known for its extensive granite quarries, and contains Europe's deepest granite quarry. It is 123 meters deep and covers 19.5 hectares.

== History ==
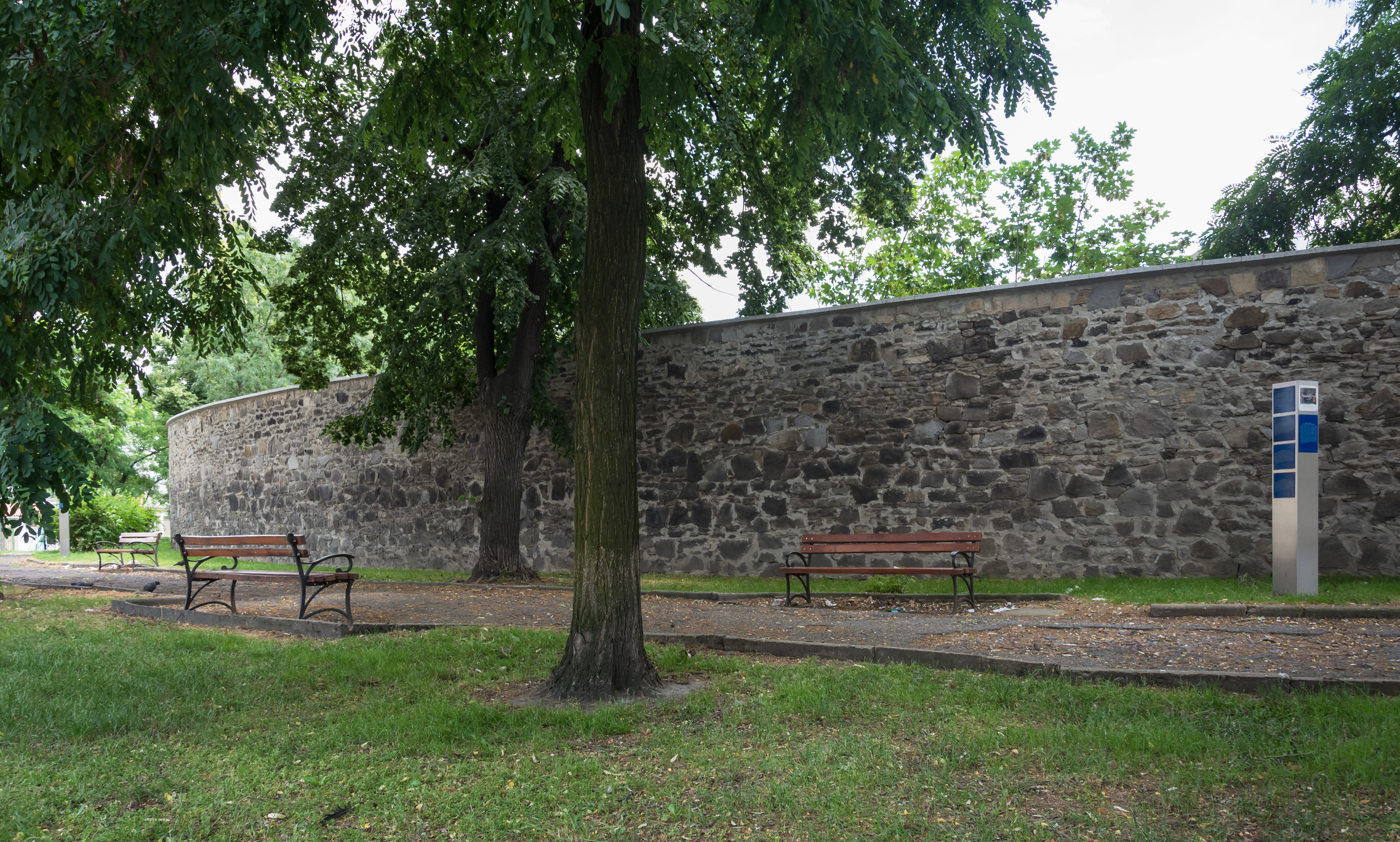
Medieval town walls

The settlement dates back to the beginnings of the Polish state. In the 12th century the Romanesque St. Godehard's Rotunda was built. The town was mentioned in the 13th and 14th centuries by its Old Polish name of Strelin. The name of the town derives from the Polish word strzała, meaning "arrow". The town's coat of arms is an example of canting, as it depicts an arrow, alluding to the town's name. It was granted town rights in 1292 by Duke Bolko I the Strict of the Piast dynasty, who also built defensive walls.

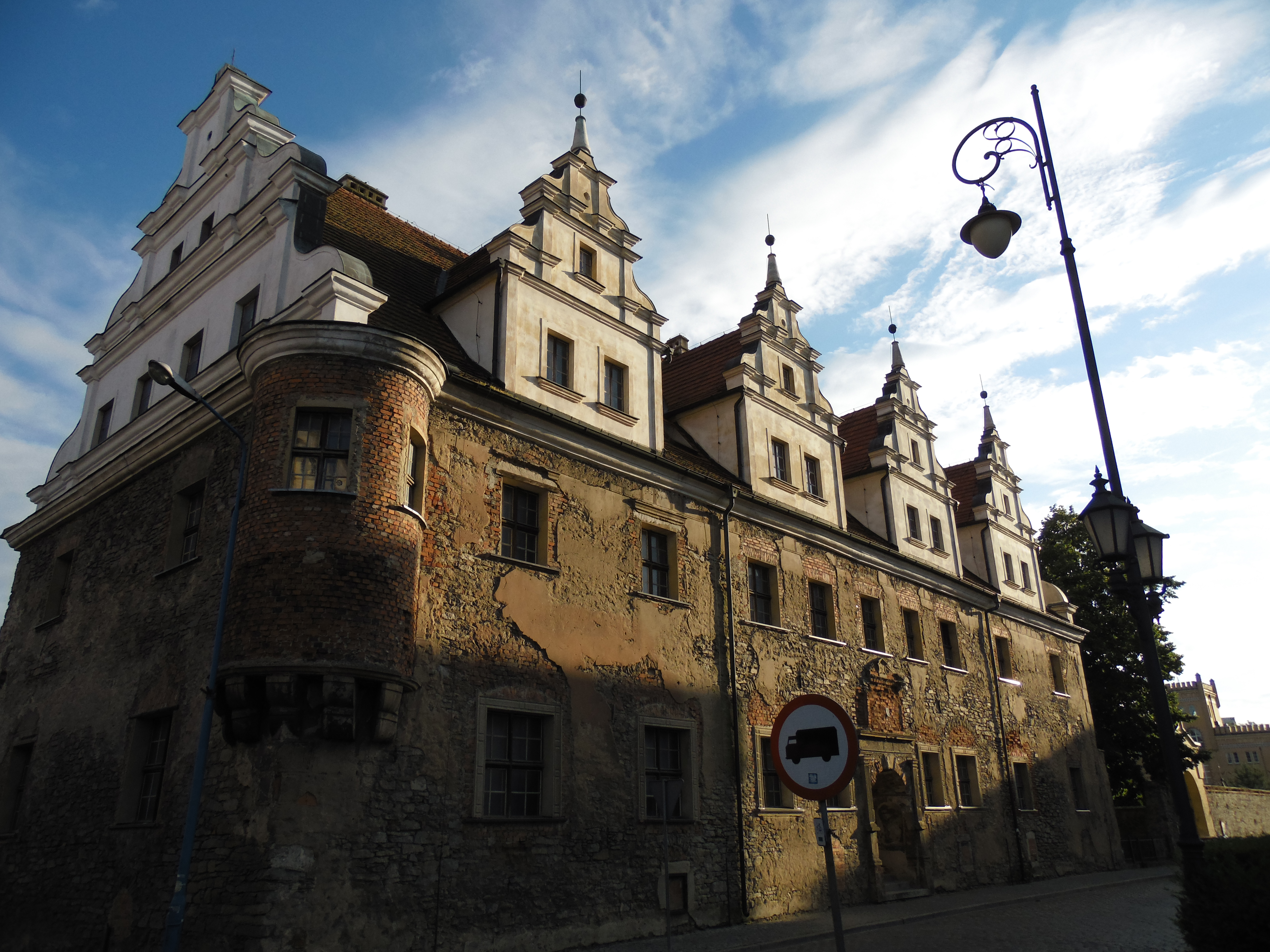
Renaissance residence of the Piast dukes

As a result of the fragmentation of Poland into smaller duchies, it became part of the Duchy of Legnica, remaining under rule of the Piasts until 1675. In the 15th century, the Hussites captured and plundered Strzelin three times. After that, in the 15th and 16th centuries the town flourished. The town's wealth came from clothmaking, shoemaking, tanning, brewing, metalworking. Strzelin was plundered many times by troops from various countries during the Thirty Years' War. In the 17th century Strzelin was located in a still predominantly Polish-speaking area. Strzelin was inhabited mainly by Poles and, as a result of immigration, by Germans and Jews.

After the death of the last Piast duke George William in 1675, the town was incorporated into the Habsburg-ruled Bohemian (Czech) Kingdom and the period of religious tolerance ended. The town's self-government was limited and the tax pressure increased. In 1742 the town was annexed by the Kingdom of Prussia. Afterwards the last remains of the town's autonomy were liquidated and a Germanisation action took place. During the Napoleonic Wars, in 1807 Polish Uhlans marched through the town, and in 1815 also Russian troops. In the 19th century new factories were established: a brick factory in 1868, a sugar factory in 1871. In 1871, a railway line connecting Strzelin with regional capital Wrocław was opened. Soon the town gained railway connections with other cities in Lower Silesia.

During World War II, the Germans brought thousands of prisoners of war to the town and the surrounding area: Poles, Frenchmen, Belgians, Russians, Englishmen and Yugoslavs. Near the end of the war, in January 1945, the German authorities displaced all the town's population. The German mayor of the town ordered to blow up the town hall tower and the tower of the Holy Cross church. On one of the town's squares, Germans hanged six Polish workers, who were hiding in the abandoned town. It was severely damaged in the course of the Lower Silesian Offensive of the Red Army against the Wehrmacht in February 1945. In May 1945 Strzelin was handed over to the Polish administration.

As of 2019, the town has a population of 12,460.

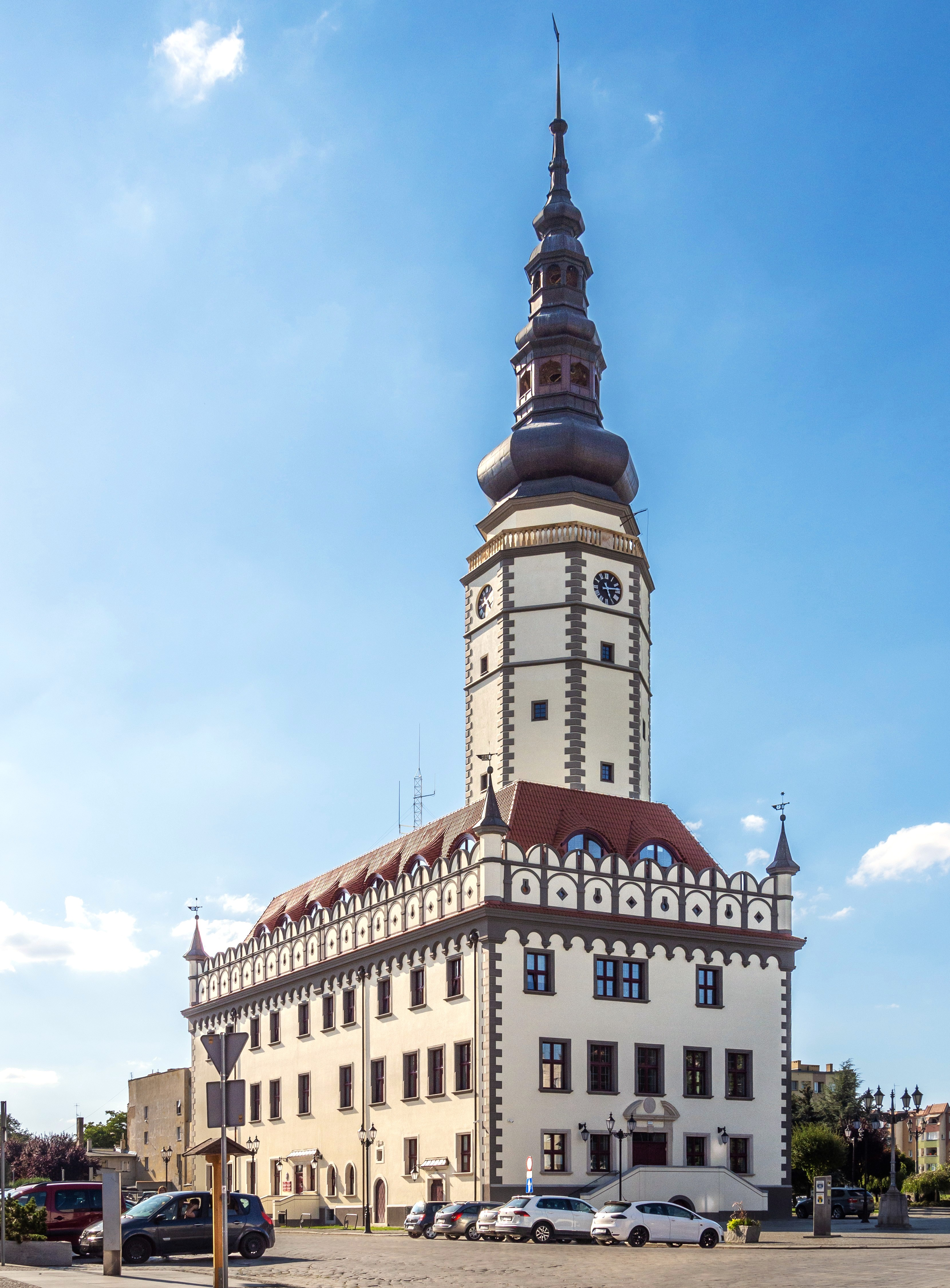
Town Hall Tower

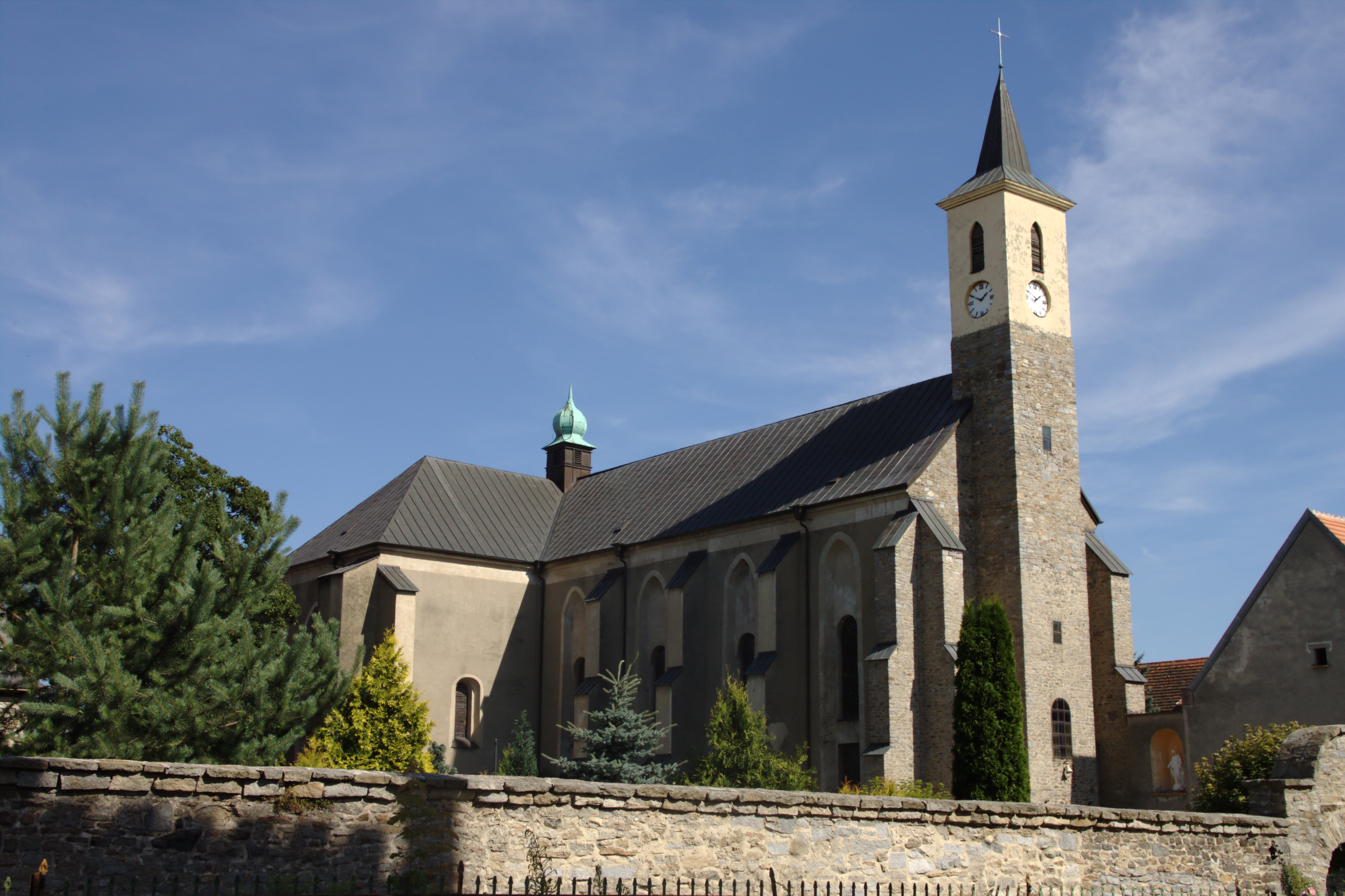
Exaltation of the Holy Cross church

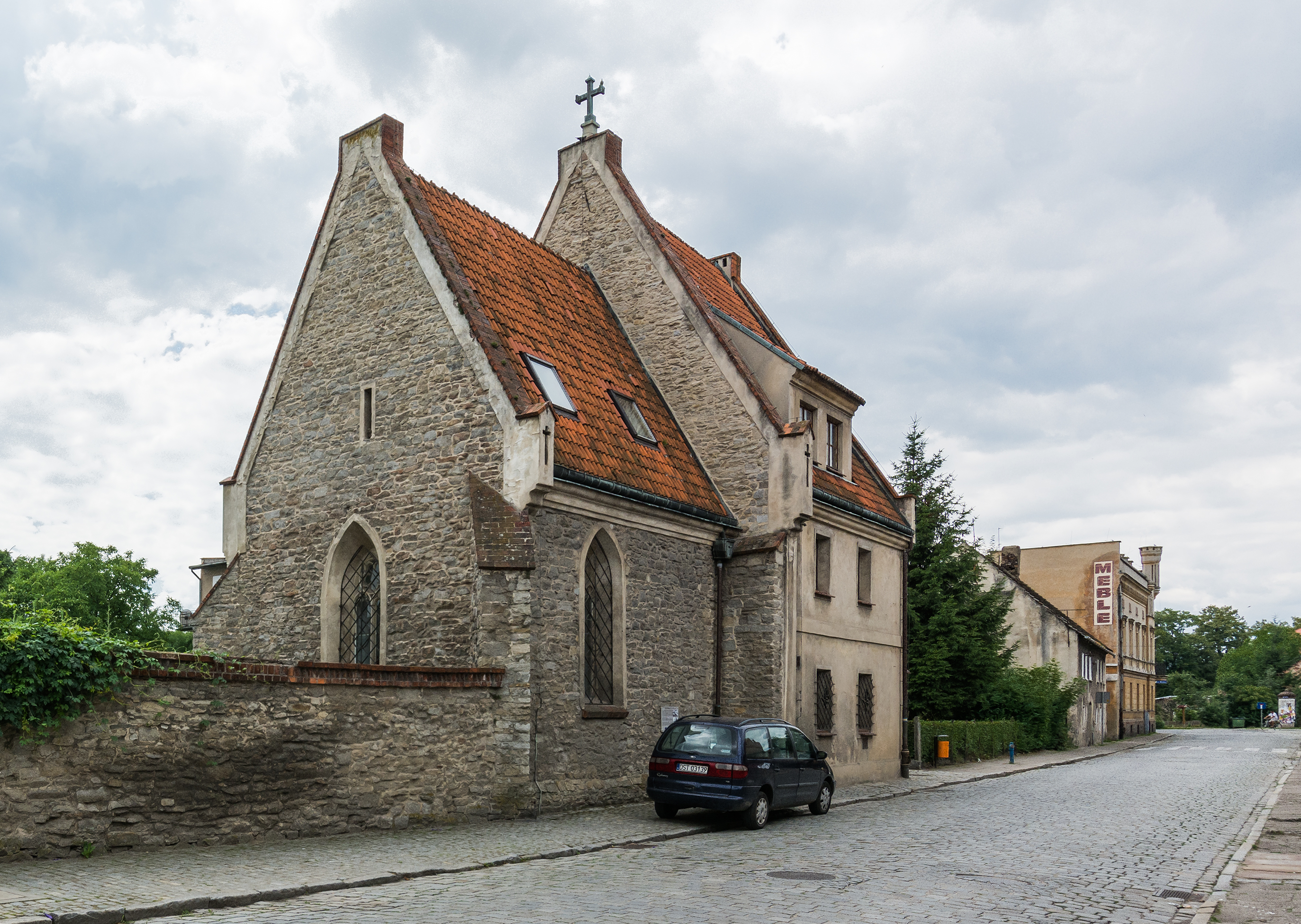
Hospital Chapel of St. George

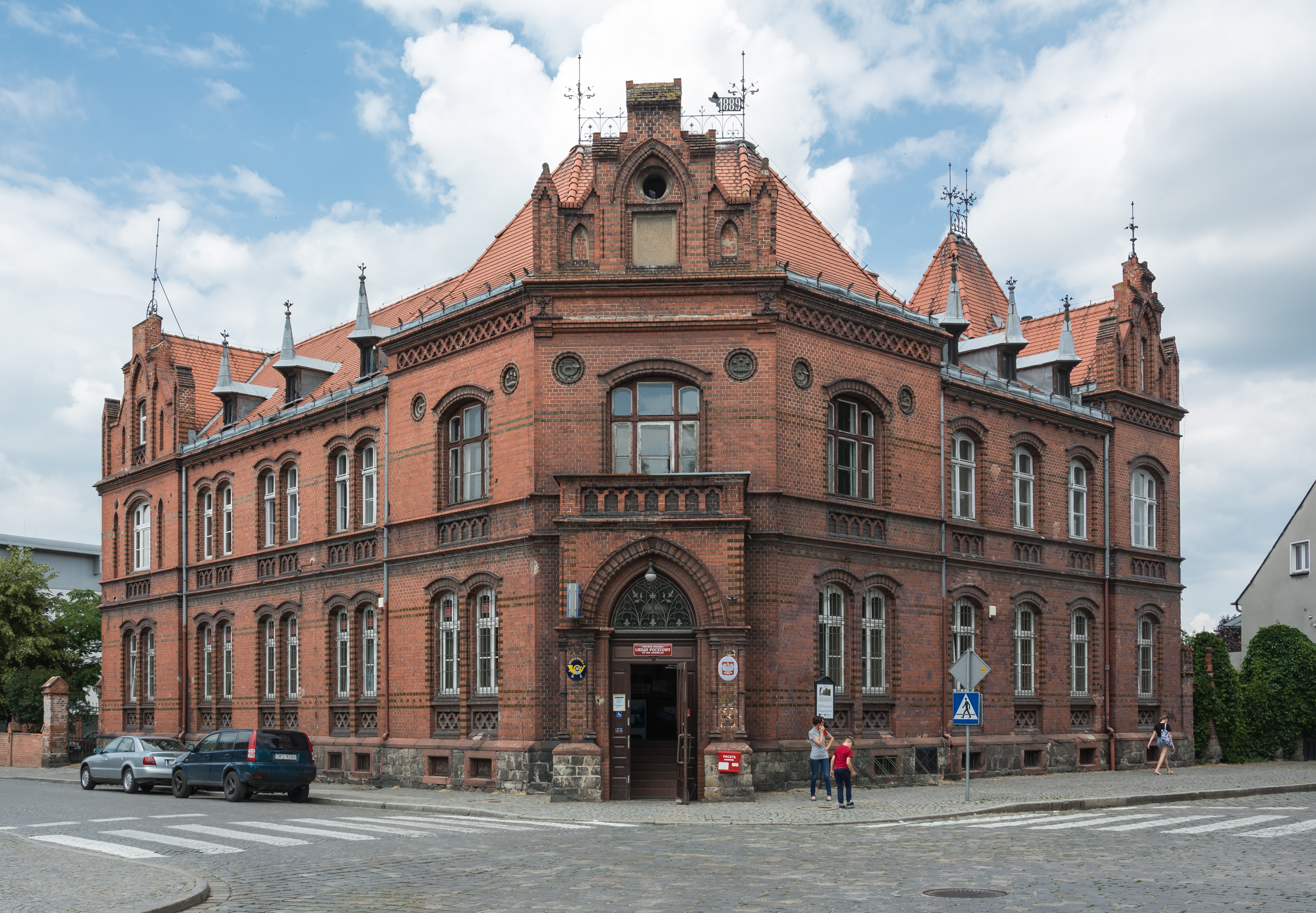
Post office

== Notable people ==
- Paul Ehrlich (1854–1915), physician, immunologist and Nobel Laureate
- Johann von Ravenstein (1889–1962), Wehrmacht general
- Błażej Augustyn, footballer for Zenit Miedzyborz, born 1988
- Michał Masłowski, footballer for the Polish team, born 1989

== Twin towns – sister cities ==
See twin towns of Gmina Strzelin.
