= Ayninbirkekin =

Municipality in Tigray Région, Ethiopia

- Municipality
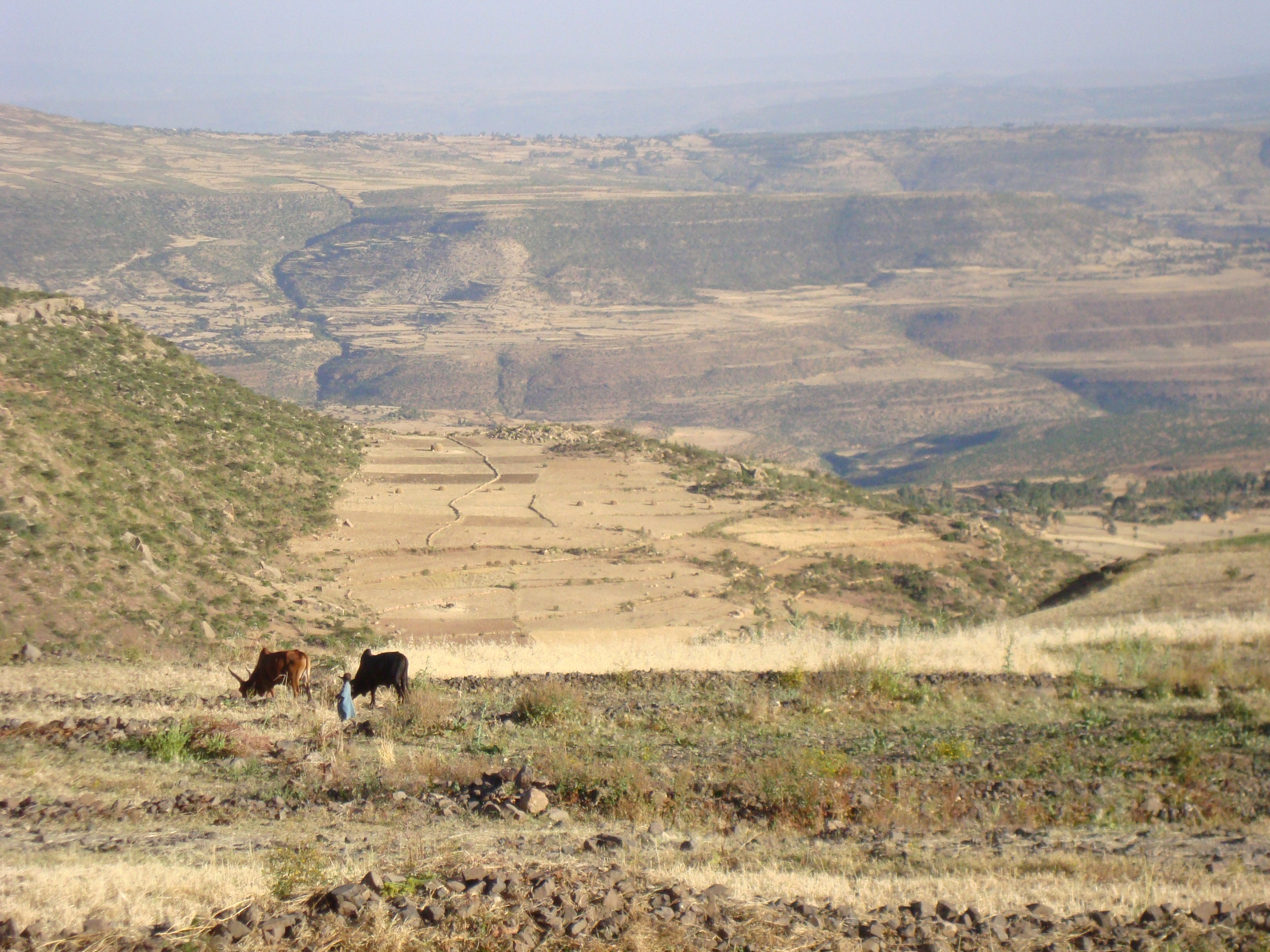
- Hamushte kebeb

- Location within Ethiopia
- Coordinates: 13°40′N 39°14′E
- Country: Ethiopia
- Region: Tigray
- Zone: Debub Misraqawi (Southeastern)
- Woreda: Dogu'a Tembien

Area
  - Total: 61.18 km^{2} (23.62 sq mi)
- Elevation: 2,360 m (7,740 ft)

Population (2007)
  - Total: 9,059
  - Density: 148/km^{2} (380/sq mi)
- Time zone: UTC+3 (EAT)

Ayninbirkekin is a tabia or municipality in the Dogu'a Tembien district of the Tigray Region of Ethiopia. Literal meaning of Ayninbirkekin in Tigrinya is "We will not bend". The tabia centre is in Halah village, located approximately 8 km to the east of the woreda town Hagere Selam. Main town is Ala'isa, situated on the ridge overseeing the Giba valley.

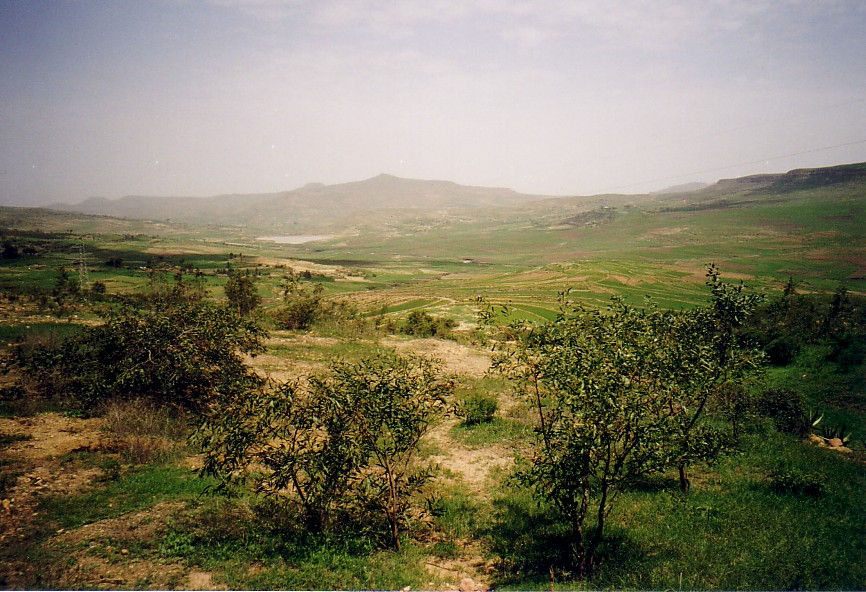
The lands of Addi Qoylo

== Geography ==
The tabia is located astride a main water divide (that is followed by the main road) and stretches down towards May Zegzeg river at the south and upper Tsaliet River at the north. Three highest places (at around 2600 m a.s.l.) are Meri'a Ziban in the west, Imba Ra'isot in the centre and the escarpment to Arebay at the north. The lowest places are the confluence of May Zegzeg and May Be'ati Rivers (1970 m a.s.l.) in the south and in the north May Leiba River near Iyesus church (2240 m a.s.l.).

=== Geology ===
From the higher to the lower locations, the following geological formations are present:

- Lower basalt
- Amba Aradam Formation
- Agula Shale
- Mekelle Dolerite
- Antalo Limestone
- Quaternary alluvium and freshwater tufa

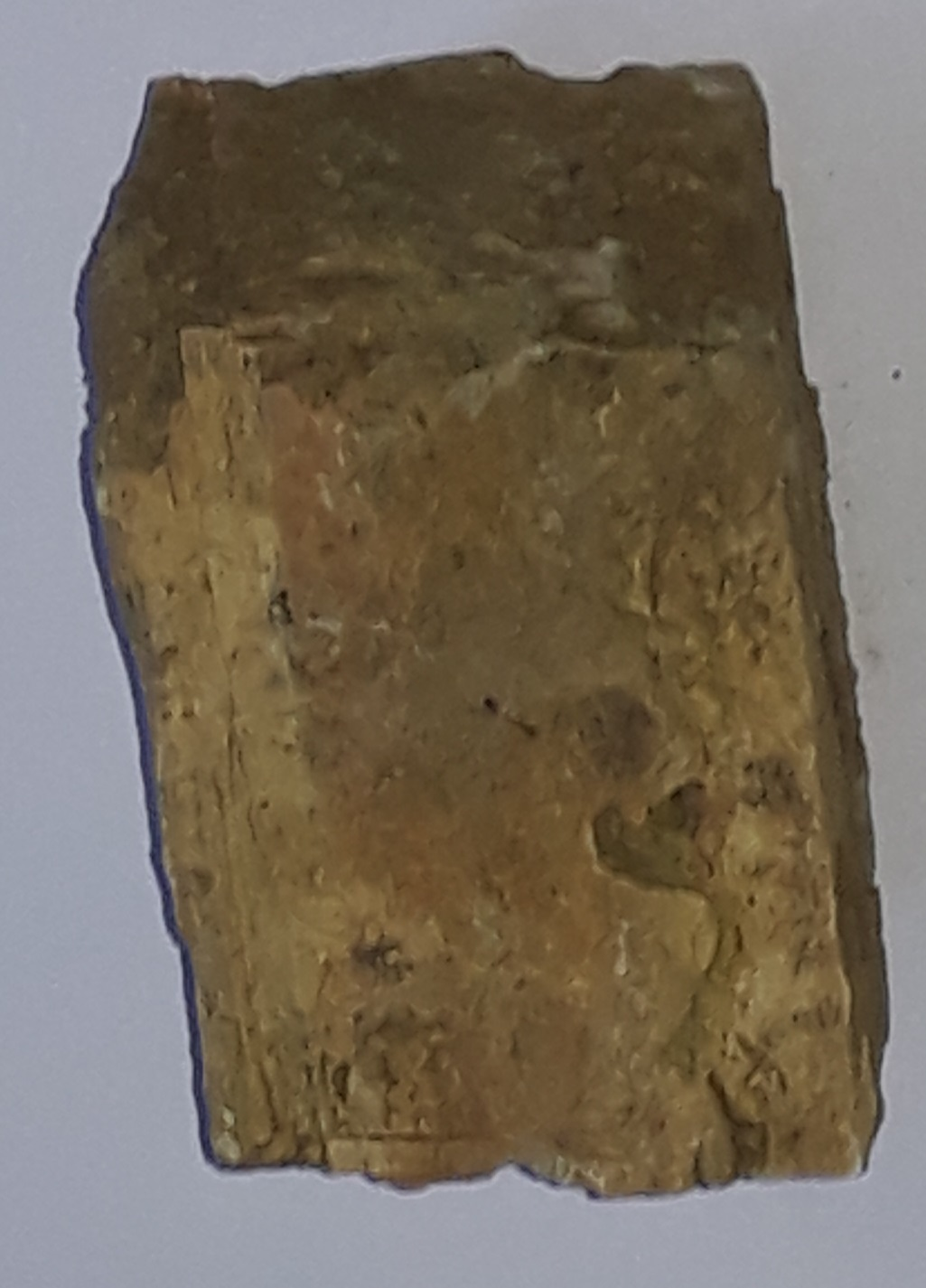
Rock sample of Agula shale, collected in May Bi'ati

=== Geomorphology and soils ===
The main geomorphic units, with corresponding soil types are:

- Hagere Selam Highlands, along the central basalt and sandstone ridge
  - Associated soil types
    - shallow soils with high stone contents (Skeletic Cambisol, Leptic Cambisol, Skeletic Regosol)
    - moderately deep dark stony clays with good natural fertility (Vertic Cambisol)
    - deep, dark cracking clays, temporarily waterlogged during the wet season (Pellic Vertisol)
  - Inclusions
    - Rock outcrops and very shallow soils (Lithic Leptosol)
    - Rock outcrops and very shallow soils on limestone (Calcaric Leptosol)
    - Deep dark cracking clays with very good natural fertility, waterlogged during the wet season (Chromic Vertisol, Pellic Vertisol)
    - Shallow stony dark loams on calcaric material (Calcaric Regosol, Calcaric Cambisol)
    - Brown loamy soils on basalt with good natural fertility (Luvisol)
- Gently rolling Antalo Limestone plateau, holding cliffs and valley bottoms on limestone
  - Associated soil types
    - shallow stony soils with a dark surface horizon overlying calcaric material (Calcaric Leptosol)
    - moderately deep dark stony clays with good natural fertility (Vertic Cambisol)
    - deep, dark cracking clays on calcaric material (Calcaric Vertisol, Calcic Vertisol)

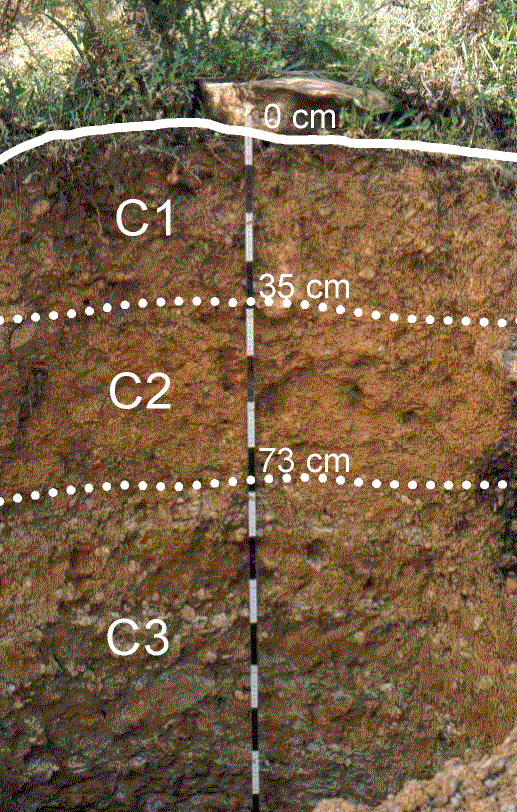
Calcaric Regosol in Hech'i

  - Inclusions
    - Rock outcrops and very shallow soils (Lithic Leptosol)
    - Shallow very stony loamy soil on limestone (Skeletic Calcaric Cambisol)
    - Deep dark cracking clays with very good natural fertility, waterlogged during the wet season (Chromic Vertisol, Pellic Vertisol)
    - Brown to dark sands and silt loams on alluvium (Vertic Fluvisol, Eutric Fluvisol, Haplic Fluvisol)

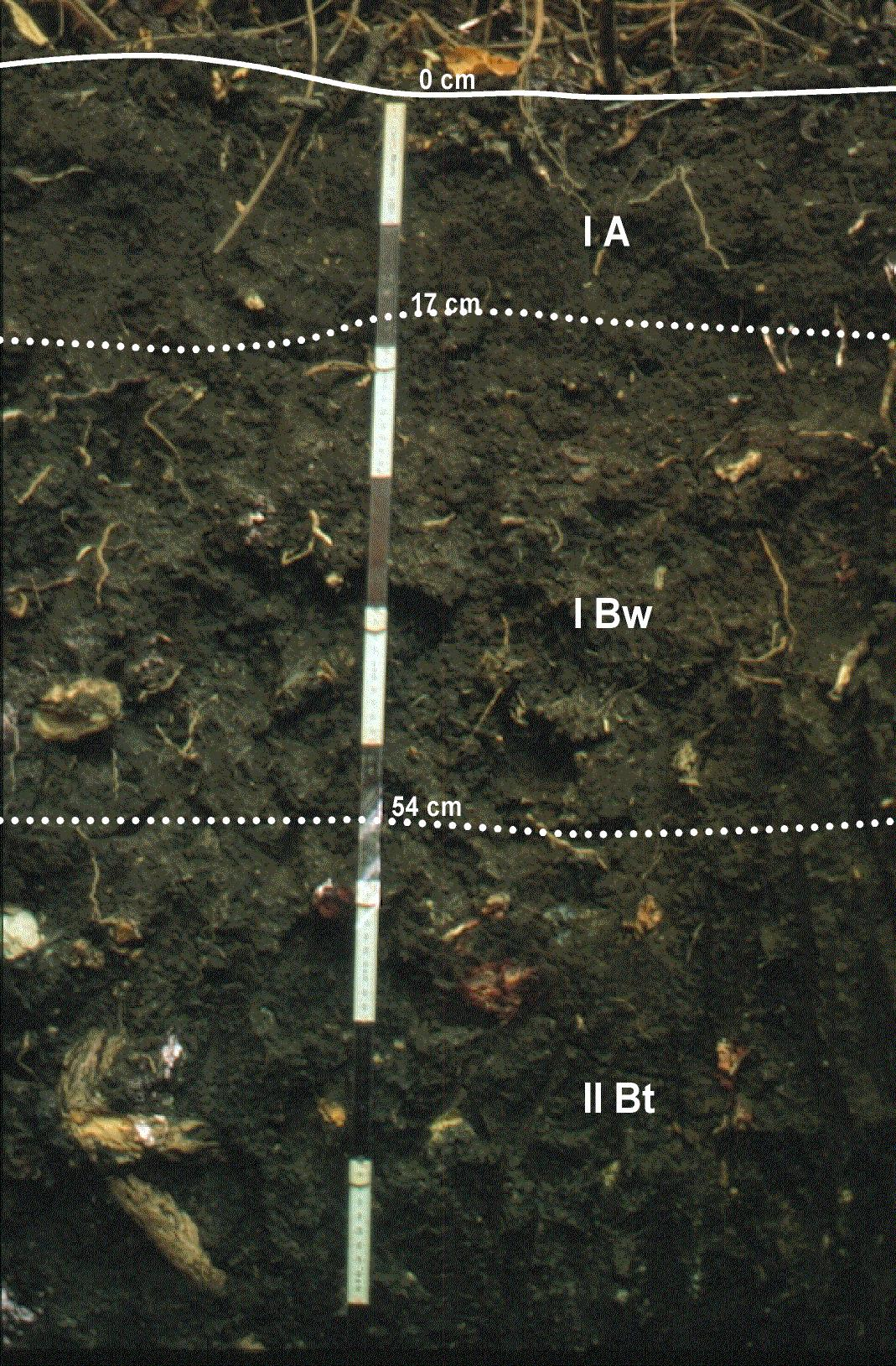
Luvic Phaeozem in Luqmuts forest in Hechi'i

Common soil types in Hech'i are Vertisol, Vertic Cambisol, Cumulic Regosol, Calcaric Regosol and Phaeozem. and, northeast of May Leiba Reservoir, "red-black" Skeletic Cambisol–Pellic Vertisol catenas on basalt and Calcaric Regosol–Colluvic Calcaric Cambisol–Calcaric Vertisol catenas on limestone.

=== Climate and hydrology ===
==== Climate and meteorology ====
The rainfall pattern shows a very high seasonality with 70 to 80% of the annual rain falling in July and August. Mean temperature in Halah is 19.1 °C, oscillating between average daily minimum of 10.7 °C and maximum of 27.2 °C. The contrasts between day and night air temperatures are much larger than seasonal contrasts.

==== Rivers ====
The Giba River as well as Tsaliet River (a tributary to Weri'i River) are the most important rivers in the surroundings of the tabia. They flow towards Tekezze River and further on to the Nile. These rivers have incised deep gorges which characterise the landscape. The drainage network of the tabia is organised as follows:

- Giba River
  - Hurura River, in tabia Addi Azmera
    - Afedena River, in tabia Addi Azmera, which takes its source in Ra'isot
    - May Ayni River, in tabia Addi Azmera, which takes also its source in Ra'isot
  - Rubaksa River, in tabia Mika'el Abiy, which becomes Inda Sillasie River, at the border of Inda Sillasie and Amanit
    - May Be'ati River, in tabia Ayninbirkekin
    - May Zegzeg River, at border of tabias Ayninbirkekin and Mika'el Abiy
      - May Sho'ate River, at border of tabias Ayninbirkekin and Mika'el Abiy
- Weri'i River
  - May Leiba, in tabia Ayninbirkekin, which becomes Tinsehe R. in Selam and Mahbere Sillasie, and Tsaliet River, downstream from the Dabba Selama monastery
    - Graliwdo River, in tabia Ayninbirkekin

Whereas they are (nearly) dry during most of the year, during the main rainy season, these rivers carry high runoff discharges, sometimes in the form of flash floods. Especially at the begin of the rainy season they are brown-coloured, evidencing high soil erosion rates.

==== Springs ====
As there are no permanent rivers, the presence of springs is of utmost importance for the local people. The main springs in the tabia are:

- May Genet in Addi Werat
- May Be'ati
- Gemgema in Ra'isot

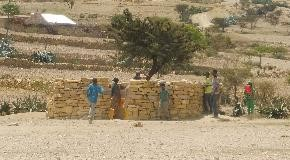
Ra'isot village pump

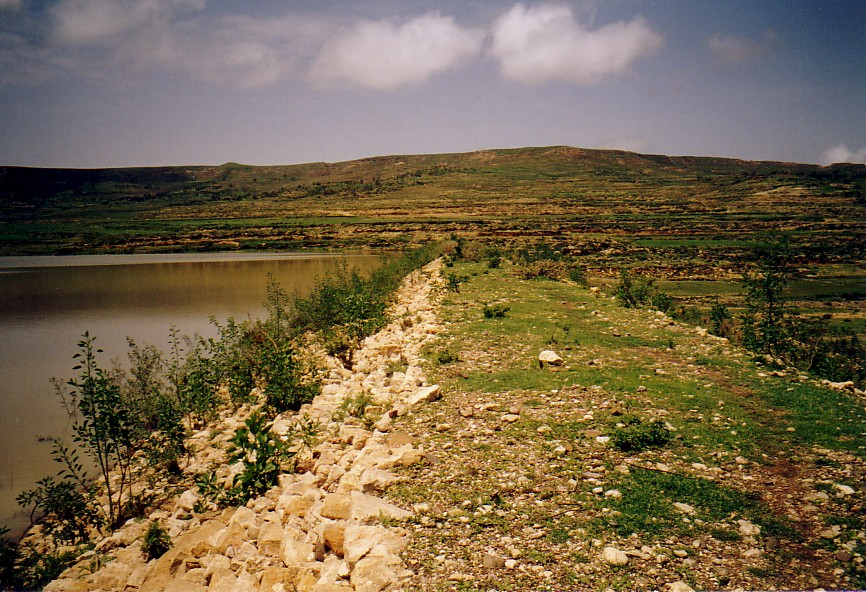
May Leiba dam

==== Water harvesting ====
In this area with rains that last only for a couple of months per year, reservoirs of different sizes allow harvesting runoff from the rainy season for further use in the dry season. Overall they suffer from siltation. Yet, they strongly contribute to greening the landscape, either through irrigation or seepage water. Main reservoirs are:

- May Leiba reservoir, constructed in 1998
- Smaller reservoirs (ponds), such as the one in the village of Addi Qoylo
- Traditional surface water harvesting ponds, particularly in places without permanent springs, called rahaya
- Horoyo, household ponds, recently constructed through campaigns

=== Vegetation and exclosures ===
The tabia holds several exclosures, areas that are set aside for regreening. Wood harvesting and livestock range are not allowed there. Besides effects on biodiversity, water infiltration, protection from flooding, sediment deposition, carbon sequestration, people commonly have economic benefits from these exclosures through grass harvesting, beekeeping and other non-timber forest products. The local inhabitants also consider it as "land set aside for future generations". In this tabia, some exclosures are managed by the EthioTrees project. They have as an additional benefit that the villagers receive carbon credits for the sequestered CO_{2}, as part of a carbon offset programme. The revenues are then reinvested in the villages, according to the priorities of the communities; it may be for an additional class in the village school, a water pond, or conservation in the exclosures. The following exclosures are managed by the Ethiotrees project in the tabia:

- Gemgema, near the village of Tsigaba (95.47 ha)
- May Be'ati, near the homonymous village (45.42 ha)

=== Settlements ===
The tabia centre Halah holds a few administrative offices, a primary school, and some small shops. The largest settlement, actually a small town, is Ala'isa, where a market is organized on Thursdays. There is also a health post and several small restaurants and shops. There are a few more primary schools across the tabia. The main other populated places are:

- Ra'isot
- Imba Ra'isot
- Tegula'i
- Addi Werat
- Addi Qisyat'
- Addi Qoylo

- Tsigaba
- Hech'i
- May Be'ati
- Addi Qolqwal

Together with Halah, these four villages are also known as Hamushte Kebeb

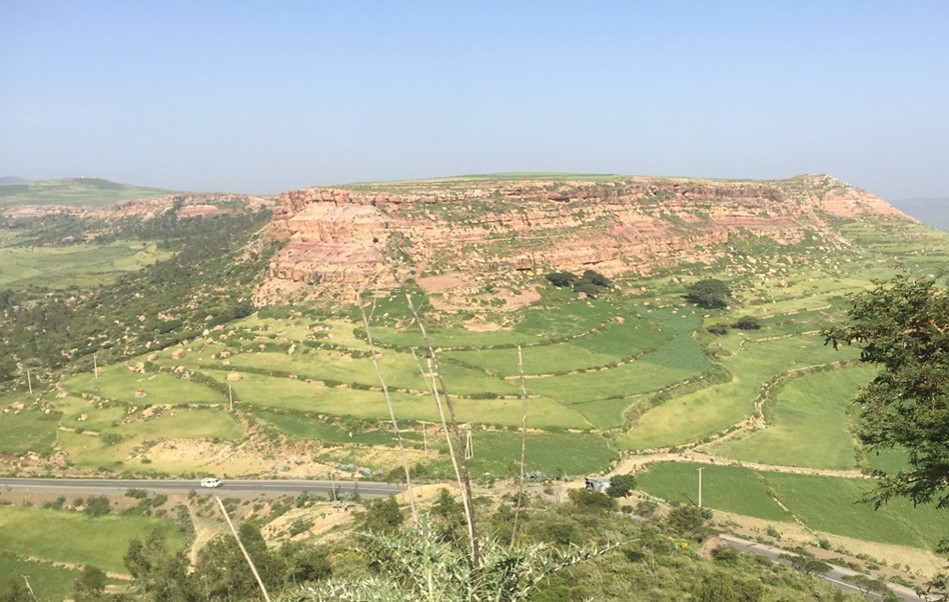
Farmlands around Ksad Halah

== Agriculture and livelihood ==
The population lives essentially from crop farming, supplemented with off-season work in nearby towns. The land is dominated by farmlands which are clearly demarcated and are cropped every year. Hence the agricultural system is a permanent upland farming system. The farmers have adapted their cropping systems to the spatio-temporal variability in rainfall.

== History and culture ==
=== History ===
The history of the tabia is strongly confounded with the history of Tembien.

One particularity is that, during warfare, a major access to Dogu'a Tembien is through the slopes east of Ala'isa town. The Derg army was defeated here by TPLF during a major battle of the 1980s civil war.

=== Religion and churches ===
Most inhabitants are Orthodox Christians. The following churches are located in the tabia:

- Addi Qolqwal Teklhaymanot
- Hechi Mika'el
- Arba'ite Insesa
- Tsigaba Maryam
- Halah Maryam
- Imba Ra'isot Sillasie

- Ra'isot Mika'el
- Ala'isa Mika'el
- Abba Gabir
- Addi Qisyat' Maryam
- Wahte Iyesus

=== Inda Siwa, the local beer houses ===
In the main villages, there are traditional beer houses (Inda Siwa), often in unique settings, where people socialise. Well known in the tabia are

- Tsadkan Kiros at Addi Qolqwal
- Letay Assefa at Halah
- Kiros Abadi at Ala'isa
- Birhan Haddush at Ala'isa

=== Legends and myths ===
The lapiez or surface karst at Inda Meru'e near Hechi is commonly interpreted as a petrified group of people on their way back from a marriage party and who had omitted to greet the church. There is also, near Hech'i a huge cubic rock, named Ilias' rock which would have been rolled there for sake of church building.

== Roads and communication ==
The main road Mekelle – Hagere Selam – Abiy Addi runs from east to west across the tabia. There are regular bus services to these towns. Further, rural access roads link Ala'isa on the main asphalt road to Arebay, Addi Qolqwal to Haddinnet and Halah to Mizane Birhan and Debre Nazret. Minibuses ply on the latter road.

== Schools ==
Almost all children of the tabia are schooled, though in some schools there is lack of classrooms, directly related to the large intake in primary schools over the last decades. Schools in the tabia include Ra'isot school.

== Tourism ==
Its mountainous nature and proximity to Mekelle make the tabia fit for tourism. As compared to many other mountain areas in Ethiopia the villages are quite accessible, and during walks visitors may be invited for coffee, lunch or even for an overnight stay in a rural homestead.

=== Touristic attractions ===
- Viewpoints on Imba Ra'isot, Guyeha Ridge and Meri'a Ziban

=== Geotouristic sites ===
The high variability of geological formations and the rugged topography invite for geological and geographic tourism or "geotourism". Geosites in the tabia include:

- Tufa dams in Tsigaba
- Lapiez in Inda Meru'e
- Landslide in Hech'i
- May Zegzeg integrated catchment management
- Lapiez in Addi Qolqwal
- Spate irrigation through gully diversion in Addi Qolqwal

- May Be'ati church forest
- Holocene stratigraphic succession in Tsigaba
- Extensive exclosures east of Tsigaba
- Exclosures by Trees for Farmers in Addi Qoylo
- May Leiba reservoir
- Luqmuts slope forest in Hech'i
- May Ntebteb springs on the edge of the Amba Aradam Formation cliff

=== Birdwatching ===
Birdwatching (for the species, see the main Dogu'a Tembien page) can be done particularly in exclosures and forests. The following bird-watching sites have been inventoried in the tabia and mapped. :

- Iyesus church forest
- Mika'el church forest in Ala'isa
- May Be'ati church forest

=== Trekking routes ===
Trekking routes have been established in this tabia. The tracks are not marked on the ground but can be followed using downloaded .GPX files.

- Trek 12, from Rubaksa, along several geosites to Hechi and Addi Qolqwal
- Trek 13, from Mizane Birhan through Tsigaba and May Be'ati to Addi Qolqwal and Meri'a Ziban on the main road
- Trek 14, along the ridges on the highest places in the tabia
- Trek 26, from Ala'isa to the Ekli Imba peak in Arebay

== See also ==
- Dogu'a Tembien district.

== Gallery ==
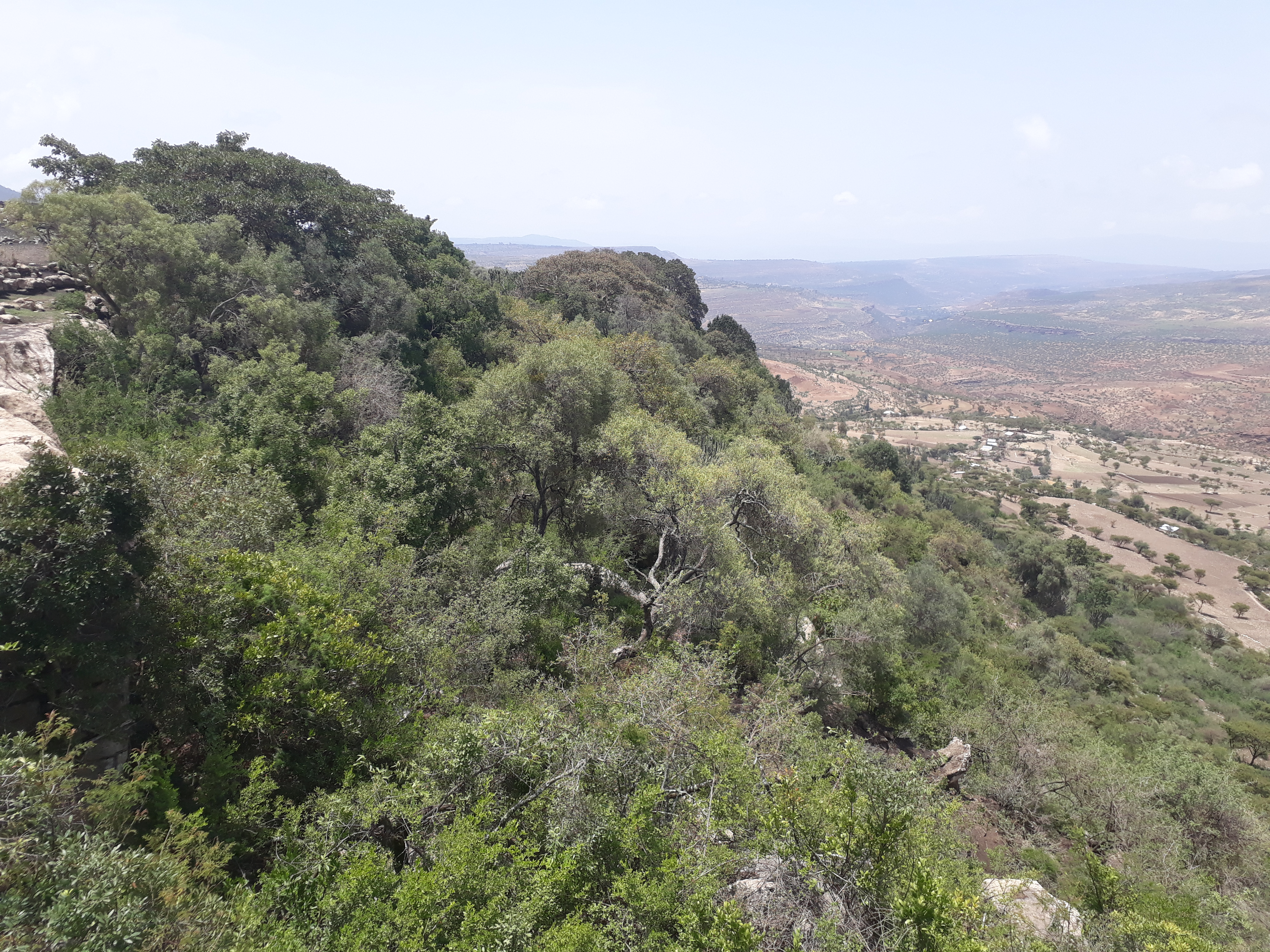
May Be'ati church forest.

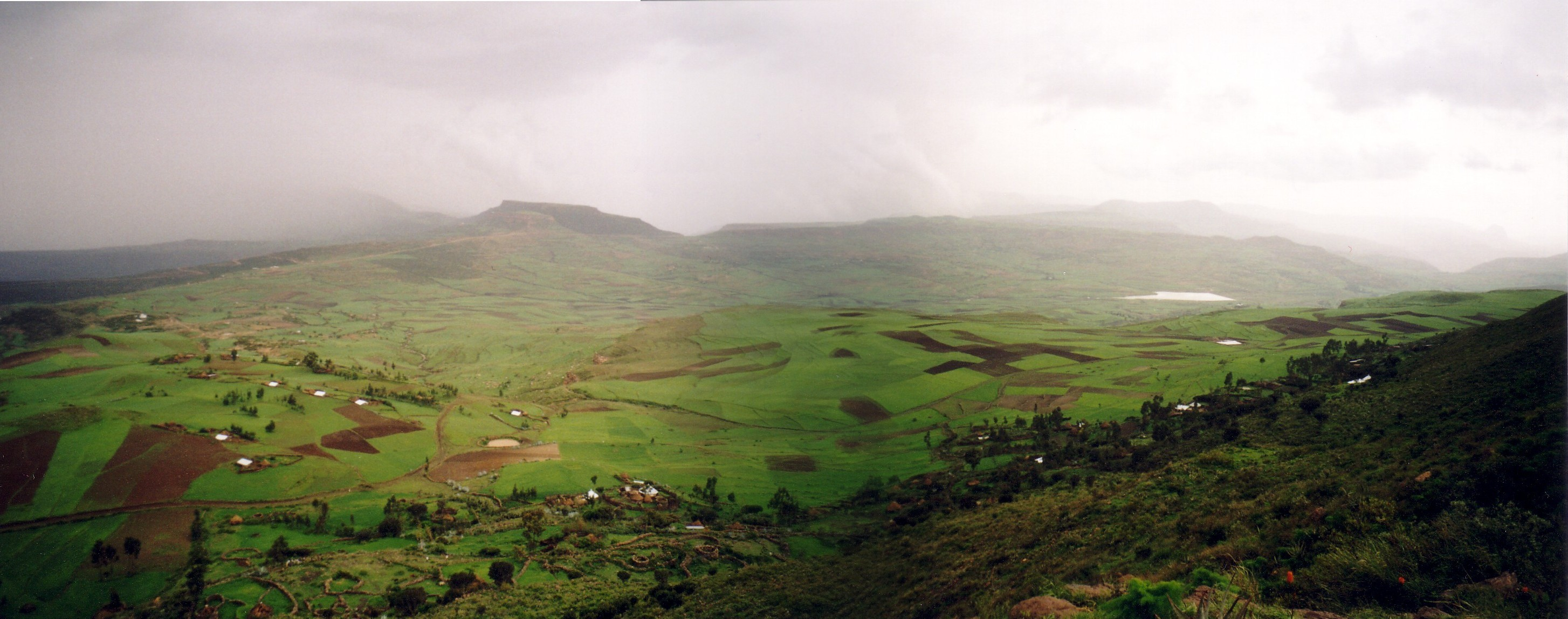
Catchment of May Leiba reservoir.

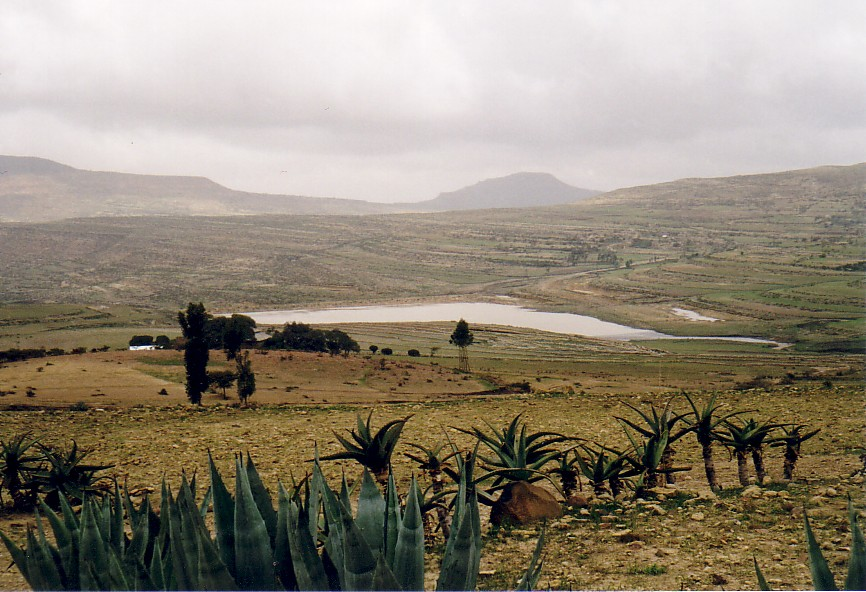
May Leiba.

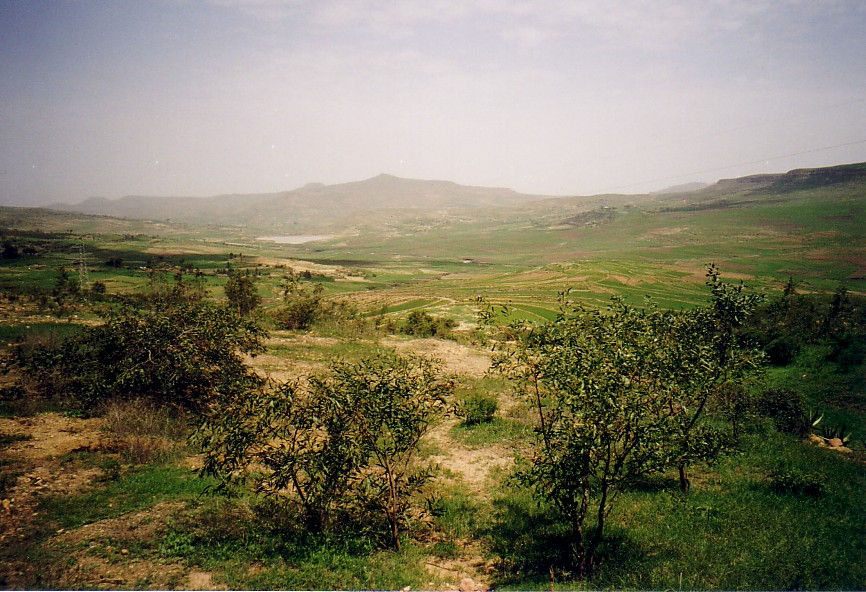
May Leiba catchment.
