= May Be'ati (exclosure) =

Exclosure for woodland restoration in Ethiopia

May Be’ati exclosure
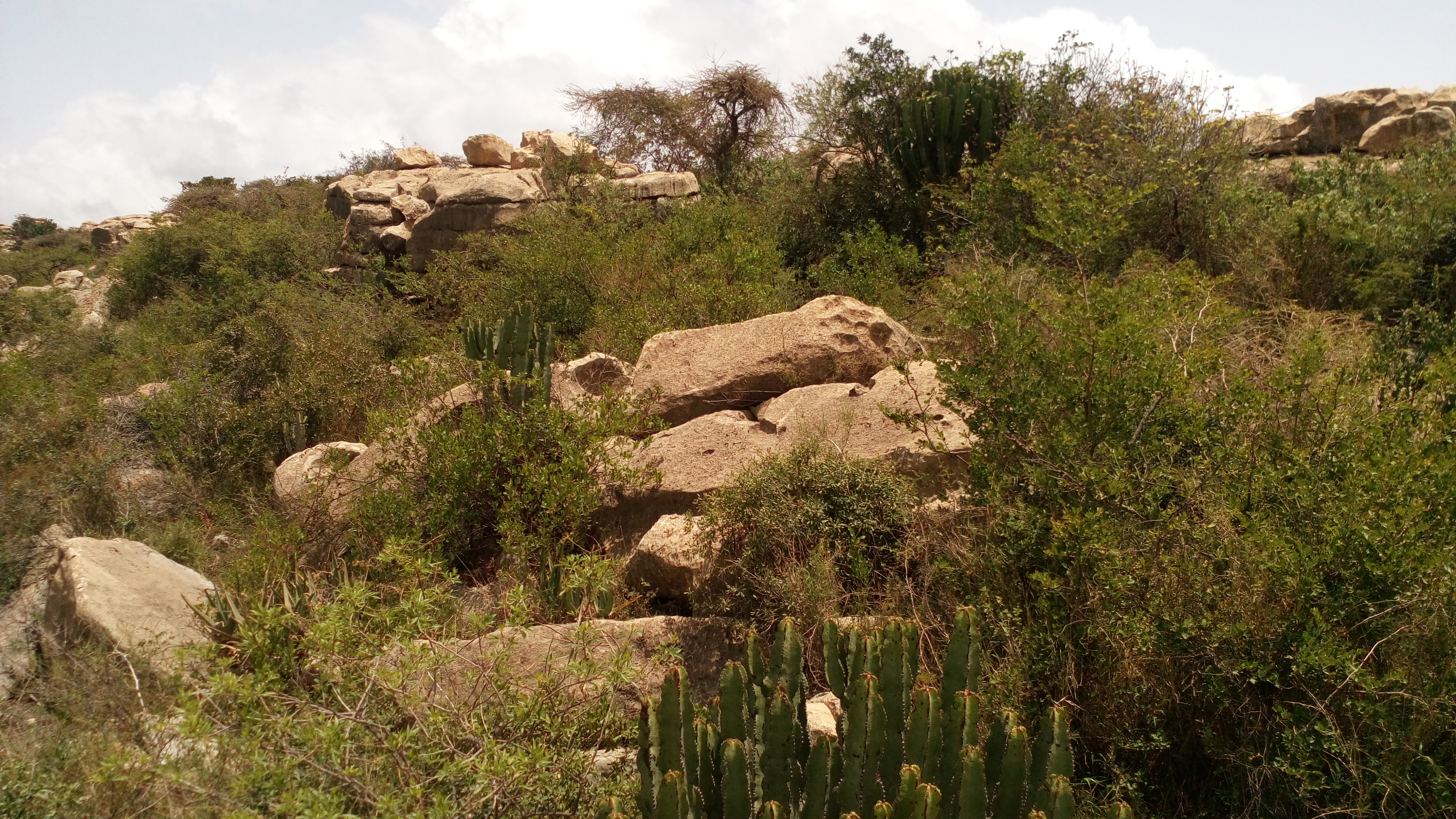
- May Be’ati exclosure

- Location within Ethiopia
- Location: Ayninbirkekin municipality, in Dogu’a Tembien district, Ethiopia
- Nearest city: Hagere Selam
- Coordinates: 13.647°N 39.213°E
- Area: 46 ha (110 acres)
- Established: 1968
- Website: https://ethiotrees.com

May Be’ati is an exclosure located in the Dogu'a Tembien woreda of the Tigray Region in Ethiopia. The area has been protected since 1968 by the local community.

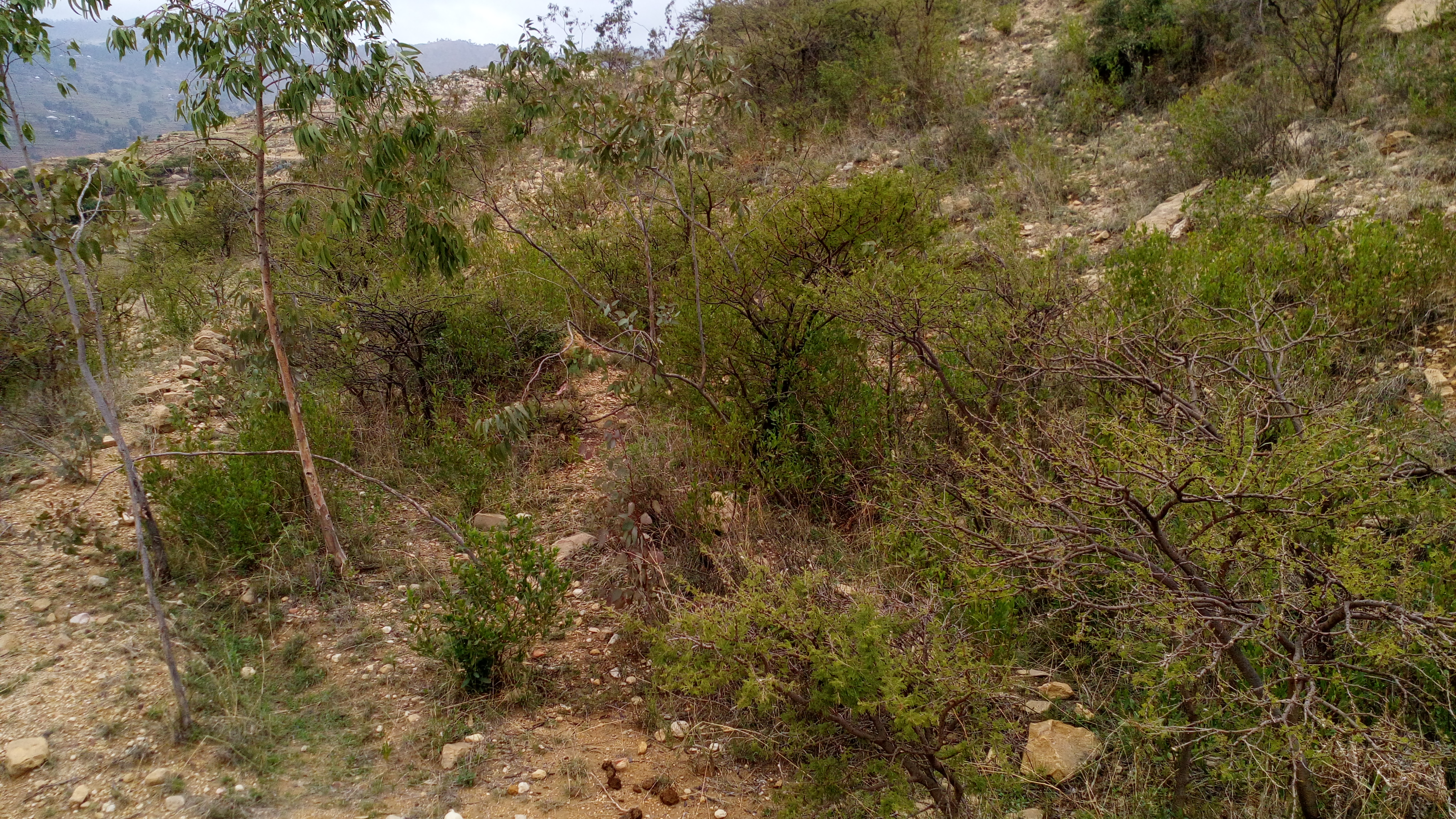
Recently closed part of the exclosure

== Timeline ==
- 1968: established as exclosure by the community
- 2017: support by the EthioTrees project

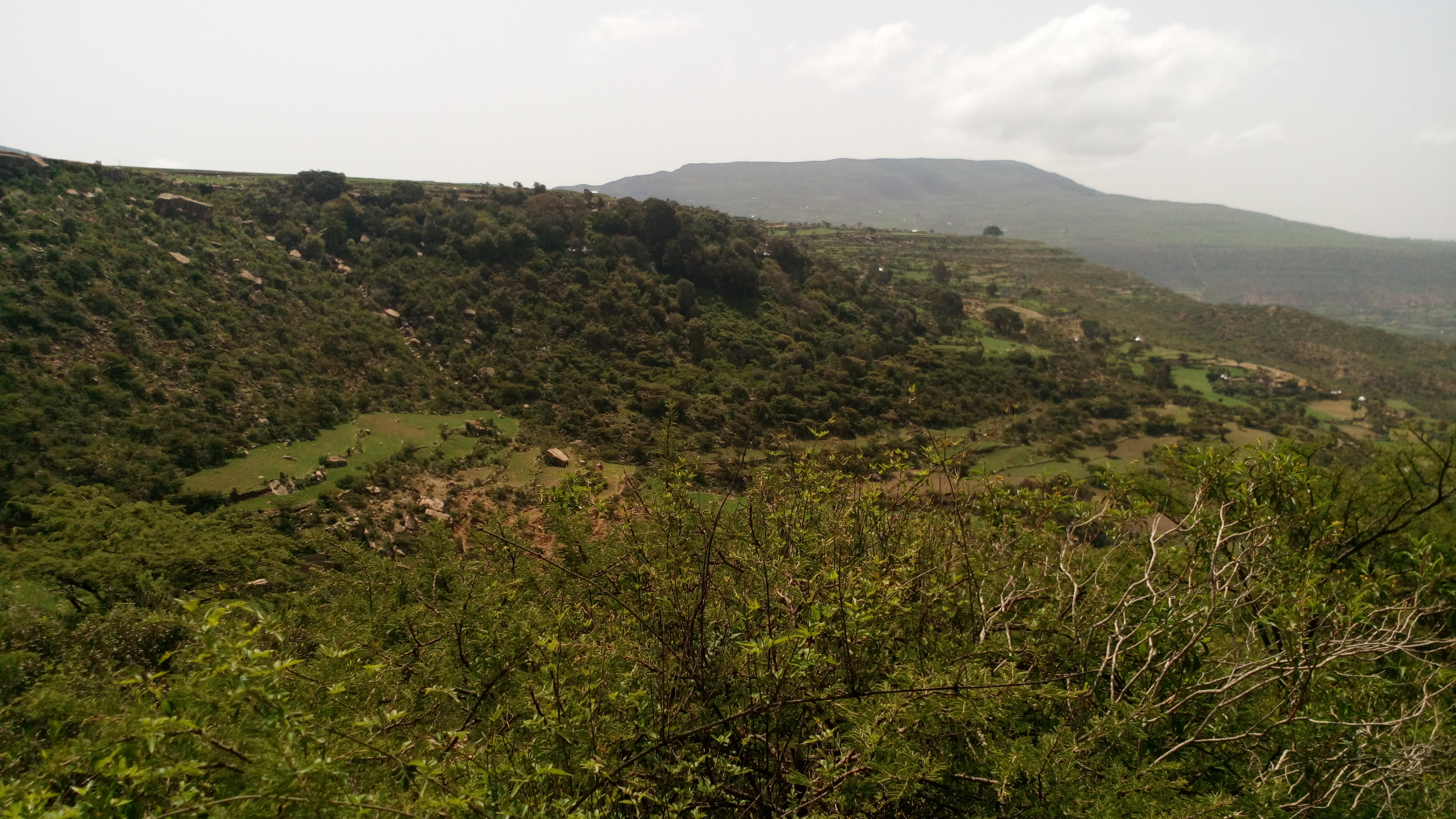
The exclosure is adjacent to a church forest (see the larger trees, which are a source of seeds).

== Environmental characteristics ==
- Area: 46 ha
- Average slope gradient: 53%
- Aspect: the exclosure is oriented towards the south
- Minimum altitude: 2268 metres
- Maximum altitude: 2428 metres
- Lithology: Antalo Limestone, partly covered by non-calcareous sediments

== Management ==
As a general rule, cattle ranging and wood harvesting are not allowed. The grasses are harvested once yearly and taken to the homesteads of the village to feed livestock. Physical soil and water conservation has been implemented to enhance infiltration, and vegetation growth. There are four guards to protect the exclosure. Field observations showed that however some illegal grazing occurred in the exclosure in 2018.

== Benefits for the community ==
Setting aside such areas fits with the long-term vision of the communities were hiza’iti lands are set aside for use by the future generations. It has also direct benefits for the community:

- improved infiltration was demonstrated in this exclosure
- improved ground water availability
- honey production
- climate ameliorator (temperature, moisture)
- the sequestered carbon (in total 73 tonnes per ha, dominantly sequestered in the soil, and additionally in the woody vegetation) is certified using the Plan Vivo voluntary carbon standard, after which carbon credits are sold
- the revenues are then reinvested in the villages, according to the priorities of the communities; it may be for an additional class in the village school, a water pond, or conservation in the exclosures.

== Water conservation ==
In the May Be'ati exclosure, more than 1000 precise measurements were done in 2003 and 2004, using 15 runoff plots, where the volume of runoff was measured daily. The rock type (Antalo Limestone), slope gradient and slope aspect were the same, the only difference was the land management and vegetation density. Whereas in degraded rangeland, 35% of the rainfall flows directly away to the river (runoff coefficient), this happens only for 13.4% of the rain in a recent exclosure and 1.7% in an old exclosure. For sake of comparison, the adjacent May Be'ati church forest has a runoff coefficient of only 0.1%. The soils of this exclosure can hold 330 litres of water per m^{3}, in contrast to 250 litres in the adjacent rangeland, and 480 litres per m³ in the nearby May Be'ati church forest.

== Spate irrigation experiment in the exclosure ==
The effectiveness of exclosures may be enhanced by supplementing additional water to the short and erratic rain. The effects of such spate irrigation on species diversity, stocking and ring width growth of trees was evaluated in this exclosure in 2005. The runoff diversion from the gully channel towards the regenerating forest was done with trenches dug at different locations to enhance an even runoff water distribution over the exclosure. The volume of irrigation water (from surface runoff) applied is of the same order of magnitude as the direct rainfall on the site. Trees in the irrigated exclosure have greater species diversity and show better growth. Particularly during the peak rainy season when there is excess water that cannot be used for crop irrigation, spate irrigation towards woody vegetation can be an important buffer for peak runoff discharges and if largely applied, it can reduce floods in the downstream areas.

== Improved ecosystem ==
With vegetation growth, biodiversity in this exclosure hast strongly improved: there is more varied vegetation and wildlife.

=== Trees ===
The main tree species found in the exclosure are:

- Savannah thorn (Acacia etbaica, renamed as Vachellia etbaica)
- Sand olive (Dodonaea viscosa subsp. angustifolia)
- Conkerberry (Carissa edulis)
- Gwarri (Euclea schimperi)
- Cat's whiskers (Becium or Ocimum grandiflorum)

=== Wildlife ===
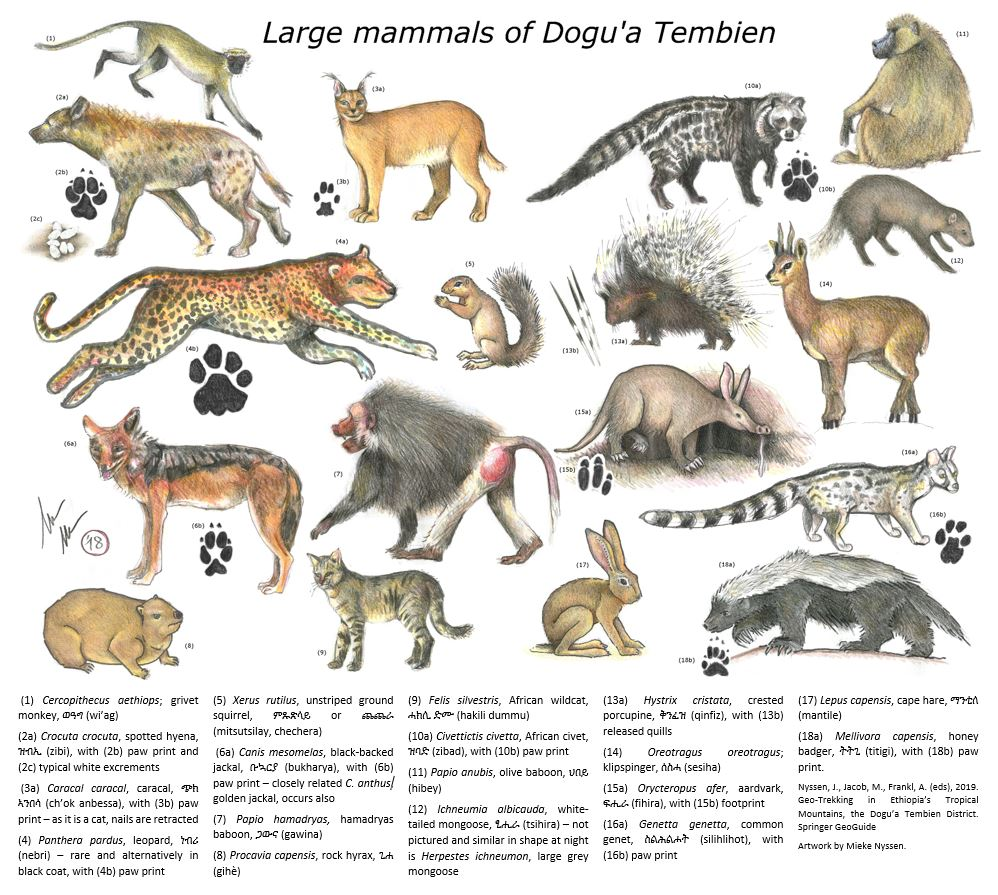

A large variety of mammals have been observed in this exclosure, with scientific (italics), English and Tigrinya language names. - Crocuta crocuta, spotted hyena, ዝብኢ (zibi) - Caracal caracal, caracal, ጭክ ኣንበሳ (ch’ok anbessa) - Xerus rutilus, unstriped ground squirrel, ምጹጽላይ or ጨጨራ (mitsutsilay, chechera) - Canis mesomelas, black-backed jackal, ቡኳርያ (bukharya) - Canis anthus, golden jackal, ቡኳርያ (bukharya) - Procavia capensis, rock hyrax, ጊሐ (gihè) - Felis silvestris, African wildcat, ሓክሊ ድሙ (hakili dummu) - Civettictis civetta, African civet, ዝባድ (zibad) - Ichneumia albicauda, white-tailed mongoose, ፂሒራ (tsihira) - Herpestes ichneumon, large grey mongoose, ፂሒራ (tsihira) - Hystrix cristata, crested porcupine, ቅንፈዝ (qinfiz) - Genetta genetta, common genet, ስልሕልሖት (silihlihot) - Lepus capensis, cape hare, ማንቲለ (mantile) - Mellivora capensis, honey badger, ትትጊ (titigi).

=== Soils ===
In the oldest parts of this exclosure, humus profiles are best developed. The old exclosures are also characterised by a variety of humus forms, caused by the variation in shrub and tree density and species composition.

Main soil types in the older part of the exclosure are:

- Humi-calcaric Cambisols, with darker upper horizons, rich in organic matter, and deeper-lying light brown calcaric horizons similar to soils in adjacent degraded rangeland
- Phaeozems, formed in sediment that has been trapped by the vegetation of the exclosure
