= Addi Welo =

Addi Welo may refer to:

== Places ==
=== Ethiopia ===
- Addi Welo, a village in the Degol Woyane municipality
- Addi Welo, a village in the Mizane Birhan municipality

== See also ==
- Welo or Wollo Province, an ancient administrative unit
- North Wollo Zone, current administrative unit
- North Wollo Zone, current administrative unit
