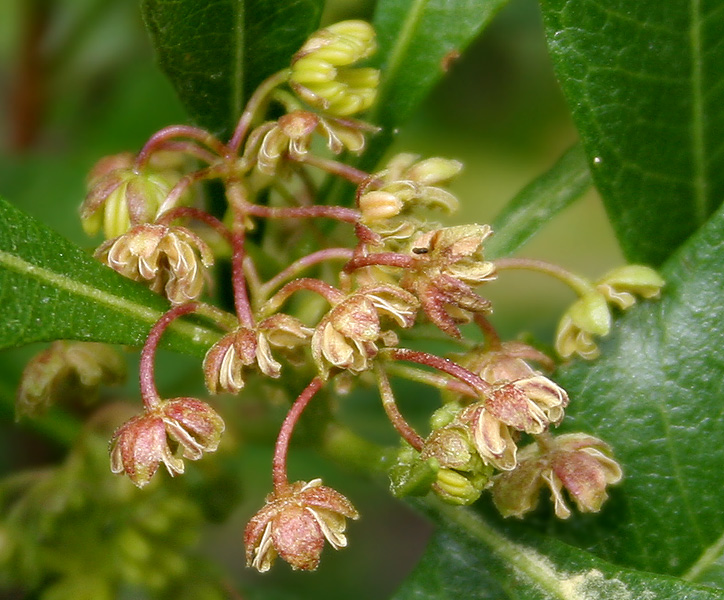
- Flowers of Dodonaea viscosa

Conservation status
- Least Concern (IUCN 3.1)

Scientific classification
- Kingdom: Plantae
- Clade: Tracheophytes
- Clade: Angiosperms
- Clade: Eudicots
- Clade: Rosids
- Order: Sapindales
- Family: Sapindaceae
- Genus: Dodonaea
- Species: D. viscosa

Binomial name
- Dodonaea viscosa Jacq.

= Dodonaea viscosa =

Species of flowering plant in the hopbush family

Dodonaea viscosa, also known as the broadleaf hopbush, is a species of flowering plant in the Dodonaea (hopbush) genus that has a cosmopolitan distribution in tropical, subtropical and warm temperate regions of Africa, the Americas, southern Asia and Australasia. Dodonaea is part of Sapindaceae, the soapberry family.

This species is notable for its extremely wide distribution, which it achieved only over the last 2 million years (from its region of origin in Australia) via oceanic dispersal. Harrington and Gadek (2009) referred to D. viscosa as having "a distribution equal to some of the world's greatest transoceanic dispersers".

== Description ==
D. viscosa is a shrub growing to 1–3 m (3.3–9.8 ft) tall, rarely a small tree to 9 m (30 ft) tall. The leaves are variable in shape: generally obovate but some of them are lanceolate, often sessile, 4–7.5 cm (1.6–3.0 in) long and 1–1.5 cm (0.39–0.59 in) broad, alternate in arrangement, and secrete a resinous substance. Many specimens have a pointed or rounded apex. Leaf base is extended. Leaf texture is leathery, tough, but also pliable. Midribs are medium becoming less visible close to the apex. Secondary veins are thin, generally indistinct; Veins: often 6 to 10 pairs, indifferently opposite, subopposite, and alternate, camptodrome. Venation branches from the midrib at different angles, which may vary from 12° to 70°. The basal veins are very ascending in some plants: the angle of divergence may be close to 45°. The basal secondary venation branches from a point near the base of the main vein and becomes parallel with the leaf margin, with the distance of 1 to 2 millimetres (0.039 to 0.079 in) from the edges. Margins are usually toothed or undulating. The remaining secondary veins lay at regular intervals with flowers usually growing at the branches' ends.

The flowers are yellow to orange-red and produced in panicles about 2.5 cm (0.98 in) in length. The flowers may be only male or female ones, and one plant bears either male or female flowers. However, sometimes they are observed to bear flowers of both sexes. The pollen is transported by anemophily. It is believed that the flowers lack petals during evolution to increase exposure to the wind. The fruit is a capsule 1.5 cm (0.59 in) broad, red ripening brown, with two to four wings.

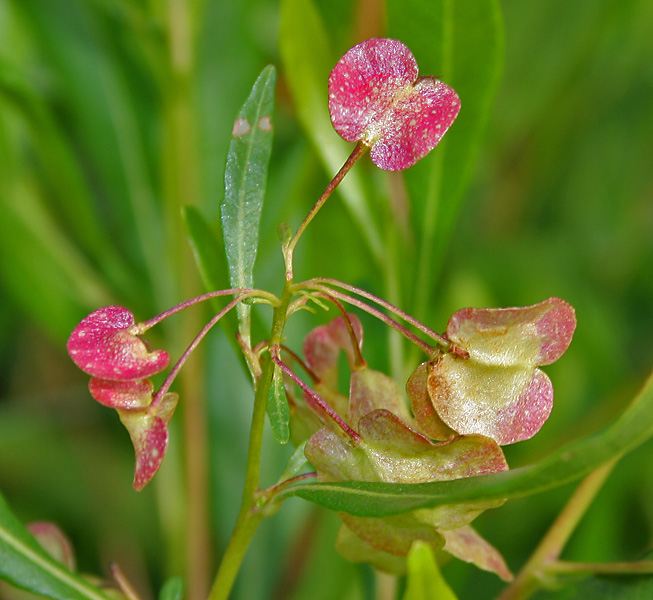
Fruits

== Common names ==
The common name 'hopbush' is used for D. viscosa specifically and also for the genus as a whole.

Australian common names include broad leaf hopbush, candlewood, giant hopbush, narrow leaf hopbush, sticky hopbush, native hop bush, soapwood, switchsorrel, wedge leaf hopbush, and native hop. The Wiradjuri people of New South Wales use the name bururr.

Other common names include: ʻaʻaliʻi and 'a'ali'i-ku ma kua and 'a'ali'i ku makani in the Hawaiian language; akeake (New Zealand); lampuaye (Guam); mesechelangel (Palau); chirca (Uruguay, Argentina); xayramad (Somalia); romerillo (Sonora, Mexico); jarilla (southern Mexico); hayuelo (Colombia); ch'akatea (Bolivia); casol caacol (Seri); ghoraskai (Afghanistan); vassoura-vermelha (Brazil); virāli (Tamil Nadu);mũrema-ngigĩ (Kikuyu language).

== Taxonomy ==
Phylogenetic evidence supports D. viscosa being the sister species to D. camfieldii, a species endemic to a small portion of coastal New South Wales in Australia.

=== Subspecies and synonyms ===
There are several subspecies as follows:

- Dodonaea viscosa subsp. angustifolia (L.f.) J.G.West
- Dodonaea viscosa subsp. angustissima (DC.) J.G.West
- Dodonaea viscosa subsp. arizonica (A.Nelson) A.E.Murray
- Dodonaea viscosa subsp. cuneata (Sm.) J.G.West
- Dodonaea viscosa subsp. elaeagnoides (Rudolphi ex Ledeb. & Adlerstam) Acev.-Rodr.
- Dodonaea viscosa subsp. mucronata J.G.West
- Dodonaea viscosa subsp. spatulata (Sm.) J.G.West
- Dodonaea viscosa L. subsp. viscosa

Botanical synonyms

- D. eriocarpa Sm.
- D. sandwicensis Sherff
- D. stenocarpa Hillebr.

=== Systematics ===
It has been identified that D. viscosa split into two intraspecific groups, known as groups I and II, in the Pleistocene, about 1.1–2.1 Ma (million years ago) (95% Highest Posterior Density, HPD). These two intraspecific groups are distributed differently within Australia. Group I plants are strandline shrubs growing from northeastern Queensland to the New South Wales border. This clade has a number of genetically divergent lineages (I:a, b, c, d, e, f, g,). It is identified that subclade Ib shared a last common ancestor with subclade Ia in the mid-Pleistocene, 0.5–1.2 Ma.

- Group I a: D. viscosa Pagan, D. viscosa ssp viscosa Yorkeys Knob Beach, D. viscosa ssp viscosa Trinity Beach, D. viscosa ssp viscosa Clifton Beach, D. viscosa ssp viscosa Wonga Beach, D. viscosa Tanzania2, D. viscosa ssp viscosa Airlie Beach, D. viscosa Virgin Islands.
- Group I b: D. viscosa Maui Ulupalakua, D. viscosa, Hawaii Pohakuloa, D. viscosa Maui PoliPoli, D. viscosa Hawaii Kona, D. viscosa Hawaii Kauai.
- Group I c: D. viscosa Arizona 1, D. viscosa Arizona 2, D. viscosa Mexico, D. viscosa Brazil, D. viscosa Columbia, D. viscosa Bolivia
- Group I d: D. viscosa Taiwan 1, D. viscosa Taiwan 2, D. viscosa Japan, D. viscosa China, D. viscosa Tanzania1.
- Group I e: D. viscosa Oman, D. viscosa South Africa1, D. viscosa India
- Group I f: D. viscosa South Africa 3, D. viscosa South Africa 4, D. South Africa 2, D. viscosa New Caledonia 1, D. viscosa New Caledonia 2, D. viscosa Papua New Guinea
- Group I g: D. viscosa ssp burmanniana 1, D. viscosa ssp burmanniana 2

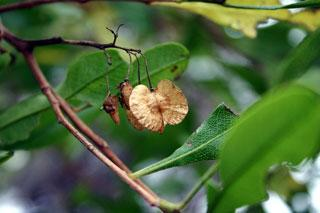
Fruit

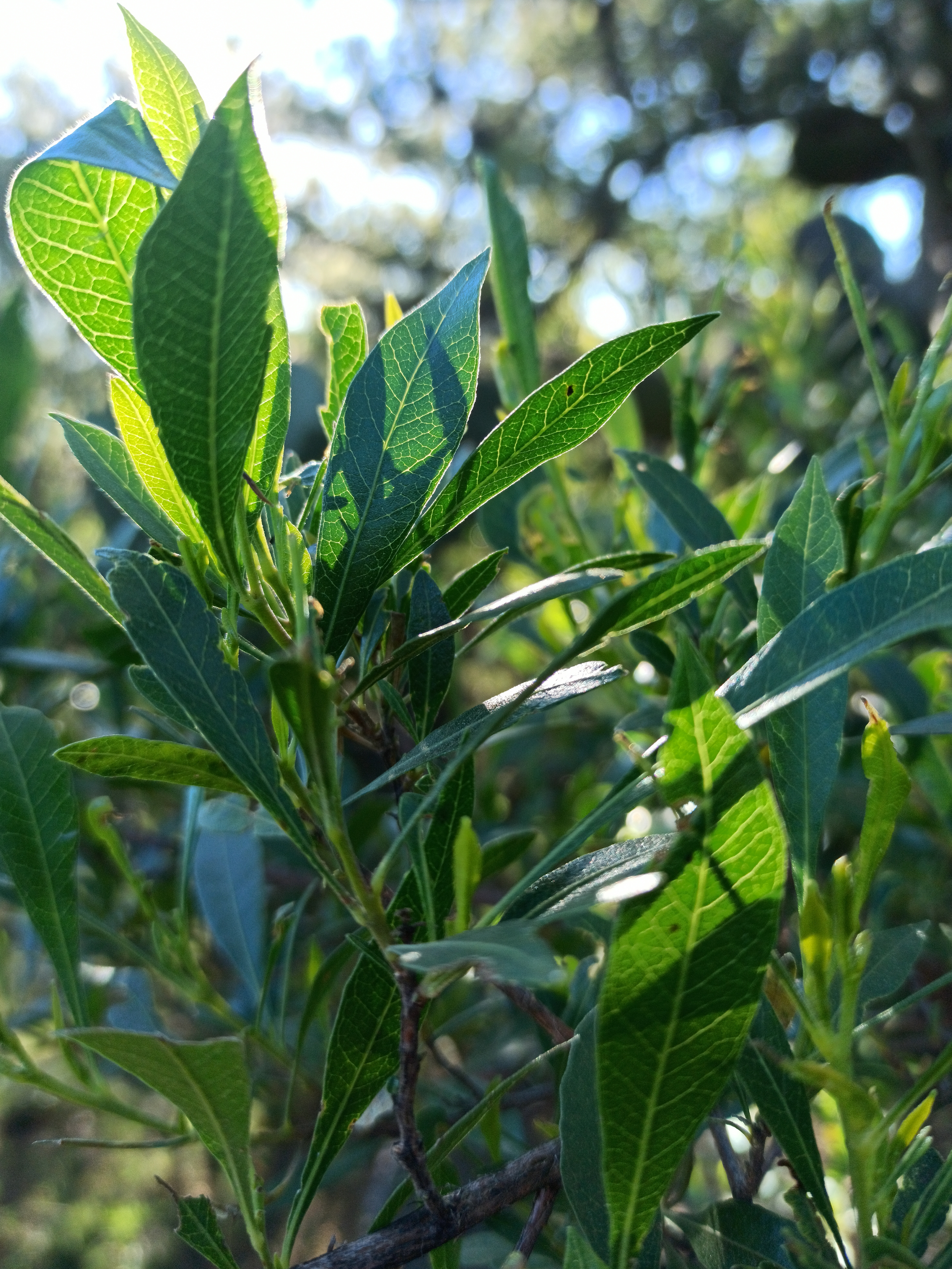
Leaves

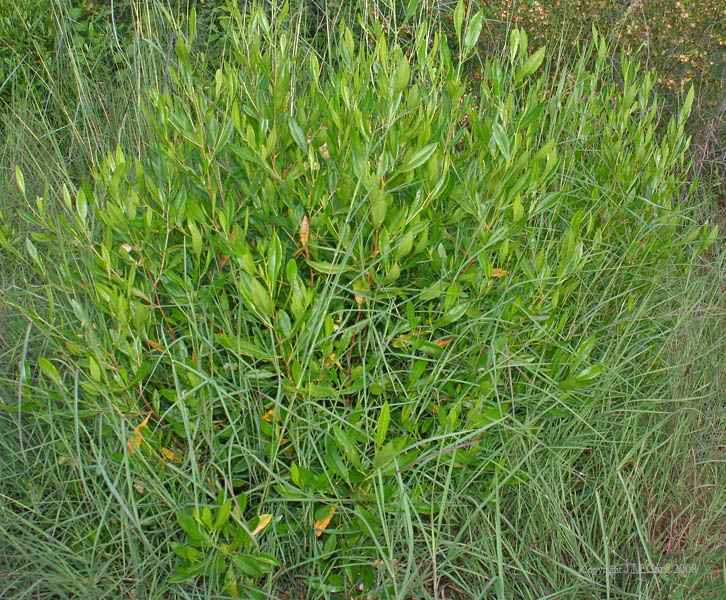
Form

The Group II of D. viscosa is present almost everywhere on the continent. Group II has at least three evolutionary lineages (II a, b and c), which distributions generally overlap. According to West these subspecies have morphological intergradation, particularly in the higher-rainfall regions of Australia, but not in the arid zone, where they generally overlap. There is also a hypothesis of ongoing gene flow between D. procumbens and D. viscosa's Group II resulting from hybridization events of two populations in central regions of South Australia. The Group II members are believed to have dispersed in the mid-Pleistocene (0.5–1.2 Ma) from mainland Australia to New Zealand.

- Group II a: D. viscosa New Zealand South Island 2, D. viscosa New Zealand South Island 3, D. viscosa New Zealand South Island 1, D. viscosa New Zealand North Island 4, D. viscosa ssp angustissima 1, D.viscosa ssp angustissima 3, D. viscosa ssp angustissima 2.
- Group II b: D. viscosa ssp spatulata, D. viscosa ssp cuneata, D. viscosa ssp angustifolia, D. procumbens, D. procumbens 2.
- Group II c: D. biloba, D. viscosa ssp mucronata.

== Uses ==
The wood is extremely tough and durable. In New Zealand, where it is the heaviest of any native wood, the Māori have traditionally used it for making weapons, carved walking staves, axe-handles, and weights on drill shafts. D. viscosa is used by the people from the western part of the island of New Guinea, Southeast Asia, West Africa and Brazil for house building and as firewood. Its leaves may also be used as plasters for wounds.

Native Hawaiians made pou (house posts), laʻau melomelo (fishing lures), and ʻōʻō (digging sticks) from ʻaʻaliʻi wood and a red dye from the fruit.

The cultivar 'Purpurea', with purple foliage, is widely grown as a garden shrub. Dodonaea viscosa easily occupies open areas and secondary forest, and is resistant to salinity, drought and pollution. It can be used for dune stabilization, remediation of polluted lands and for reforestation. The plant is tolerant to strong winds, and therefore is commonly used as a hedge, windbreak, and decorative shrub.

The Seri use the plant medicinally. It was also used to stimulate lactation in mothers, as a dysentery treatment, to cure digestive system disorders, skin problems and rheumatism in Africa and Asia. In New Guinea, people use it as incense for funerals. In the past D. viscosa was used instead of hops for beer brewing by Australians (as reflected in the name "hopbush").

== Cultivation ==
Dodonaea viscosa can be grown from seeds. However, pre-treatment of the seed in very hot water may be needed. The plant can also be cultivated by taking cuttings. Sometimes this method is also used to obtain female plants with their winged fruits for the aesthetic value. Hopbush can survive long dry periods and is easily cultivated without heavy feeding. Due to it being frost sensitive, it grows best under shelter in well-drained, moist soil with full sun. It can grow in a variety of areas but should not be planted in places prone to fire because it burns quite easily.

== Ecology ==
Dodonaea viscosa is a shrub, with a wide distribution in tropical and subtropical regions around the world. D. viscosa leaves secrete a white resinous substance with allelopathic effects. In coastal regions of Brazil, D. viscosa reduced the abundance of other native species by five times compared to open sites and exhibited a strong negative interaction strength, indicating an interfering interaction pattern.
