= Graliwdo =

River in the Tembien highlands of Ethiopia

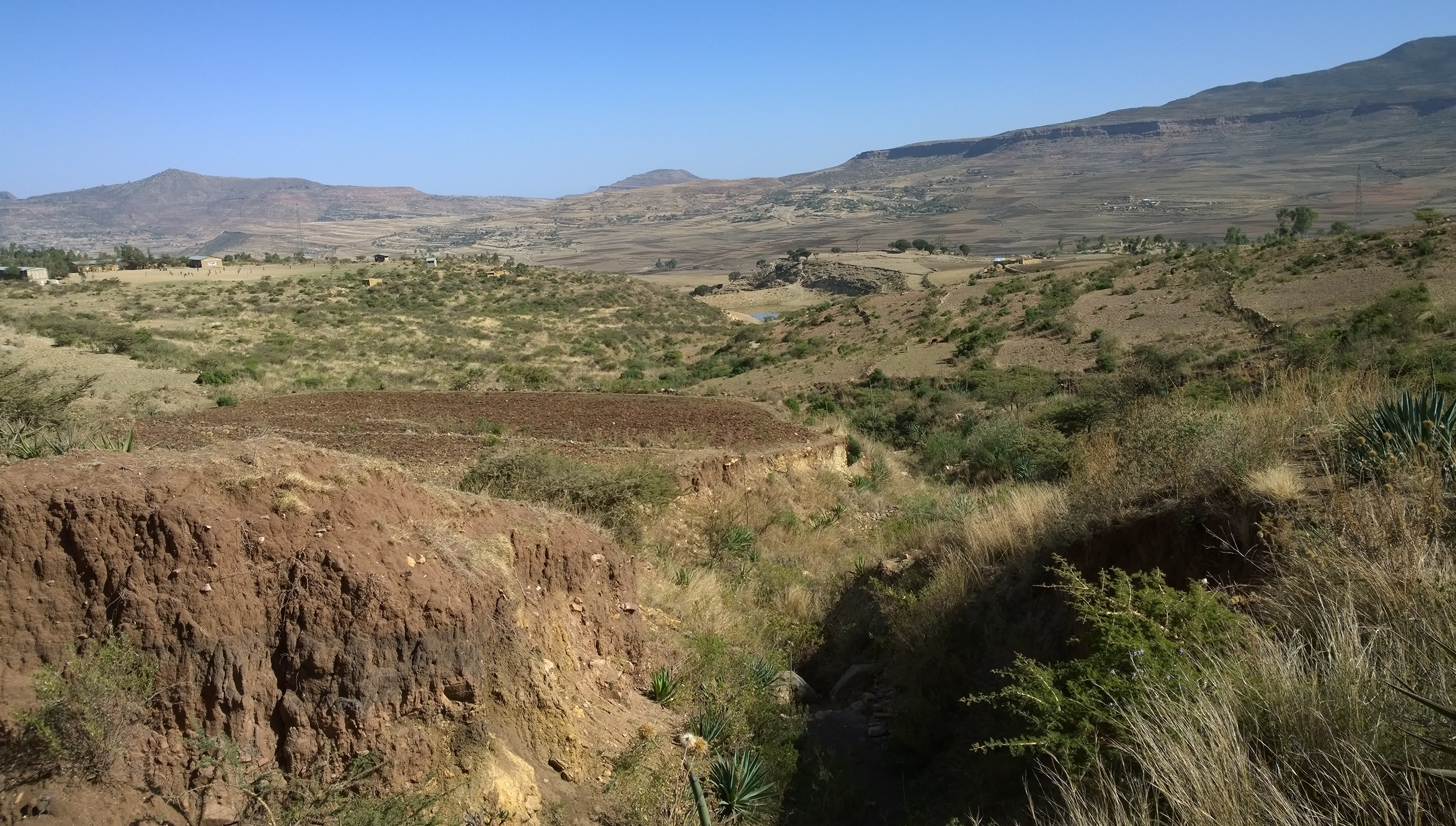
- The Graliwdo River at Addi Qoylo

- Graliwdo River in Dogu’a Tembien

Location
- Country: Ethiopia
- Region: Tigray Region
- District (woreda): Dogu’a Tembien

Physical characteristics
- Source: Kolu Ba'alti
  - location: Imba Ra’isot in Ayninbirkekin municipality
  - elevation: 2,469 m (8,100 ft)
- Mouth: May Leiba River
  - location: May Leiba in Ayninbirkekin municipality
  - coordinates: 13.689°N 39.248°E
  - elevation: 2,320 m (7,610 ft)
- Length: 2.7 km (1.7 mi)
- Width
  - average: 7 m (23 ft)

Basin features
- Progression: Tsaliet→ Wari→ Tekezé→ Atbarah→ Nile→ Mediterranean Sea
- River system: Seasonal river
- Waterbodies: Kolu Ba'alti Reservoir
- Topography: Mountains and deep gorges

The Graliwdo is a river of the Nile basin. Rising in the mountains of Dogu’a Tembien in northern Ethiopia, it flows northward to empty finally in the Weri’i and Tekezé River.

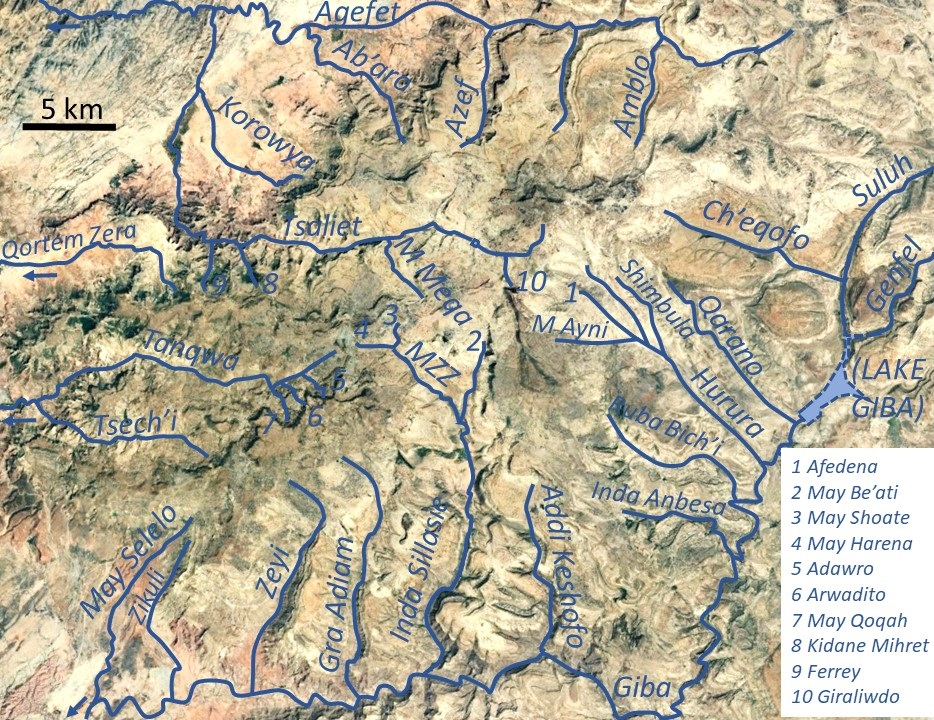
The river in the radial drainage network of Dogu’a Tembien

== Characteristics ==
The Graliwdo is a confined ephemeral river, locally meandering in its narrow alluvial plain, with an average slope gradient of 78 metres per kilometre.

== Hydrology ==
The effects of check dams on runoff response have been studied in this river. An increase of hydraulic roughness by check dams and water transmission losses in deposited sediments are responsible for the delay of runoff to reach the lower part of the river channels. The reduction of peak runoff discharge was larger in the river segment with check dams and vegetation (minus 12%) than in segment without treatment (minus 5.5%). Reduction of total runoff volume was also larger in the river with check dams than in the untreated river. The implementation of check dams combined with vegetation reduced peak flow discharge and total runoff volume as large parts of runoff infiltrated in the sediments deposited behind the check dams. As gully check dams are implemented in a large areas of northern Ethiopia, this contributes to groundwater recharge and increased river baseflow.

== Flash floods and flood buffering ==
Runoff mostly happens in the form of high runoff discharge events that occur in a very short period (called flash floods). These are related to the steep topography, often little vegetation cover and intense convective rainfall. The peaks of such flash floods have often a 50 to 100 times larger discharge than the preceding baseflow. The magnitude of floods in this river has however been decreased due to interventions in the catchment.

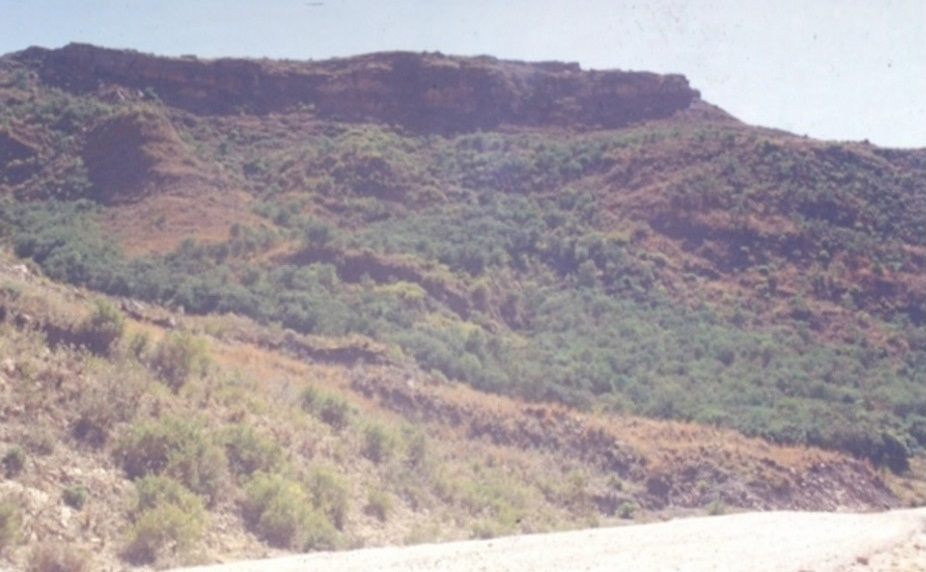
Exclosure in upper Graliwdo catchment

At the upper catchment, an exclosure has been established; the dense vegetation largely contributes to enhanced infiltration, less flooding and better baseflow. Physical conservation structures such as stone bunds and check dams also intercept runoff.

== Irrigated agriculture ==
Besides springs and reservoirs, irrigation is strongly dependent on the river's baseflow. Such irrigated agriculture is important in meeting the demands for food security and poverty reduction. A few irrigated lands are established down from the Kolu Ba’alti reservoir.

== Boulders and pebbles in the river bed ==
Boulders and pebbles encountered in the river bed can originate from any location higher up in the catchment. In the uppermost stretches of the river, only rock fragments of the upper lithological units will be present in the river bed, whereas more downstream one may find a more comprehensive mix of all lithologies crossed by the river. From upstream to downstream, the following lithological units occur in the catchment.

- Amba Aradam Formation
- Antalo Limestone
- Quaternary freshwater tufa

== See also ==
- List of Ethiopian rivers
