= Gemgema =

Exclosure for woodland restoration in Ethiopia

Gemgema exclosure
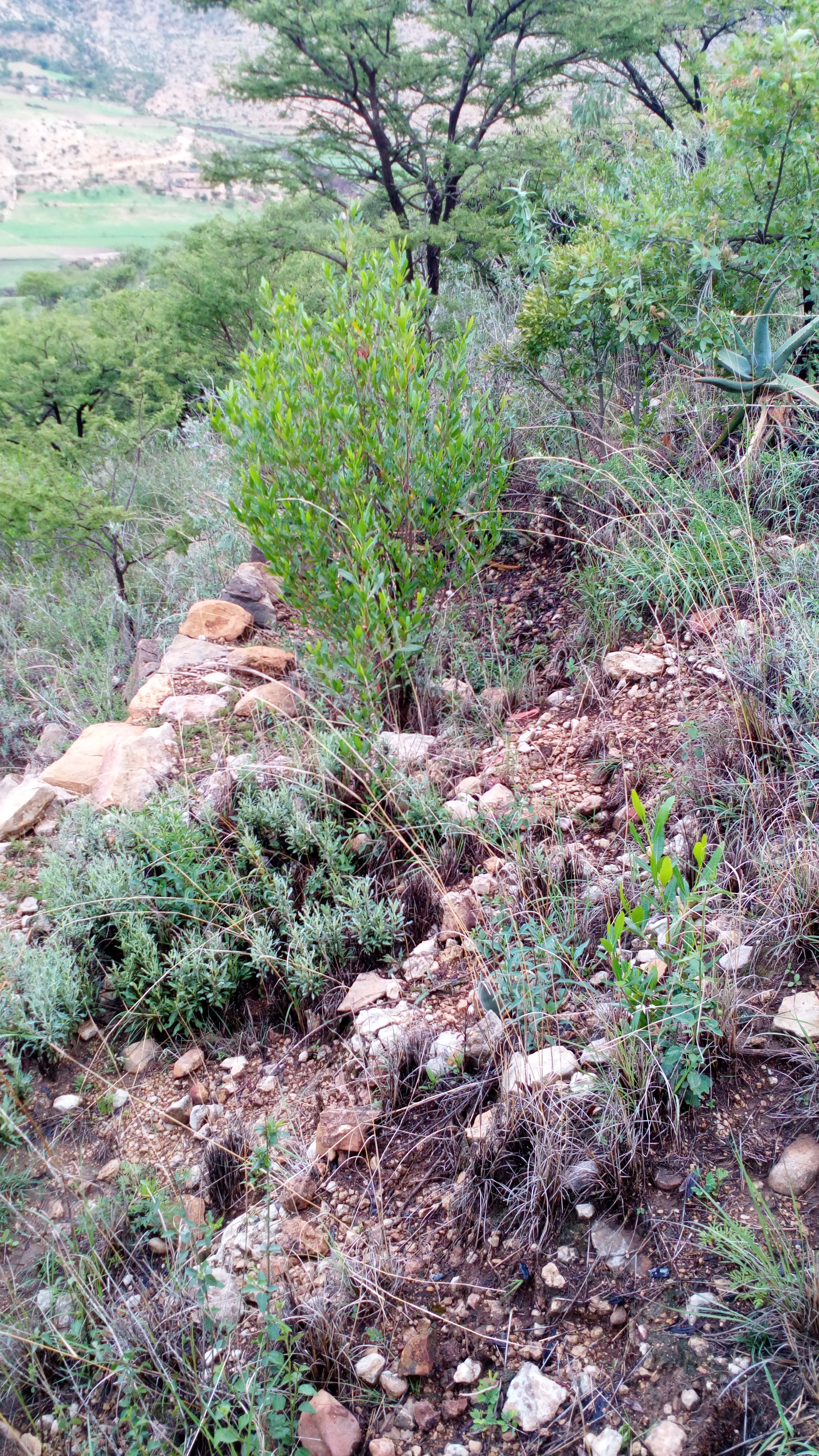
- Gemgema exclosure

- Location within Ethiopia
- Location: Ayninbirkekin municipality, in Dogu’a Tembien district, Ethiopia
- Nearest city: Hagere Selam
- Coordinates: 13.646°N 39.24°E
- Area: 92 ha (230 acres)
- Established: 1992
- Website: https://ethiotrees.com

Gemgema is an exclosure located in the Dogu'a Tembien woreda of the Tigray Region in Ethiopia. The area has been protected since 1992 by the local community.

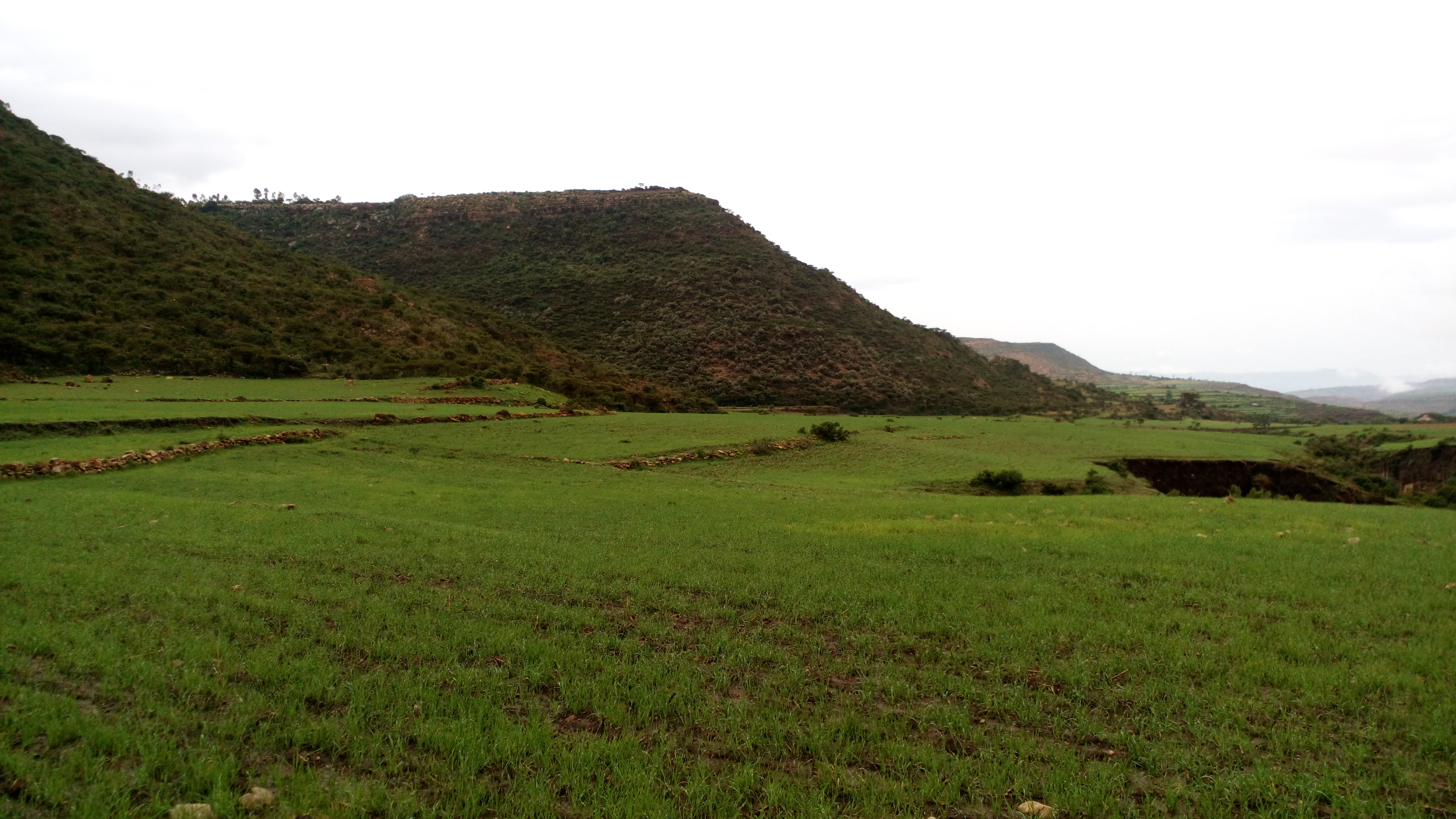
General view on Gemgema

== Timeline ==
- 1992: established as exclosure by the community
- 2017: support by the EthioTrees project

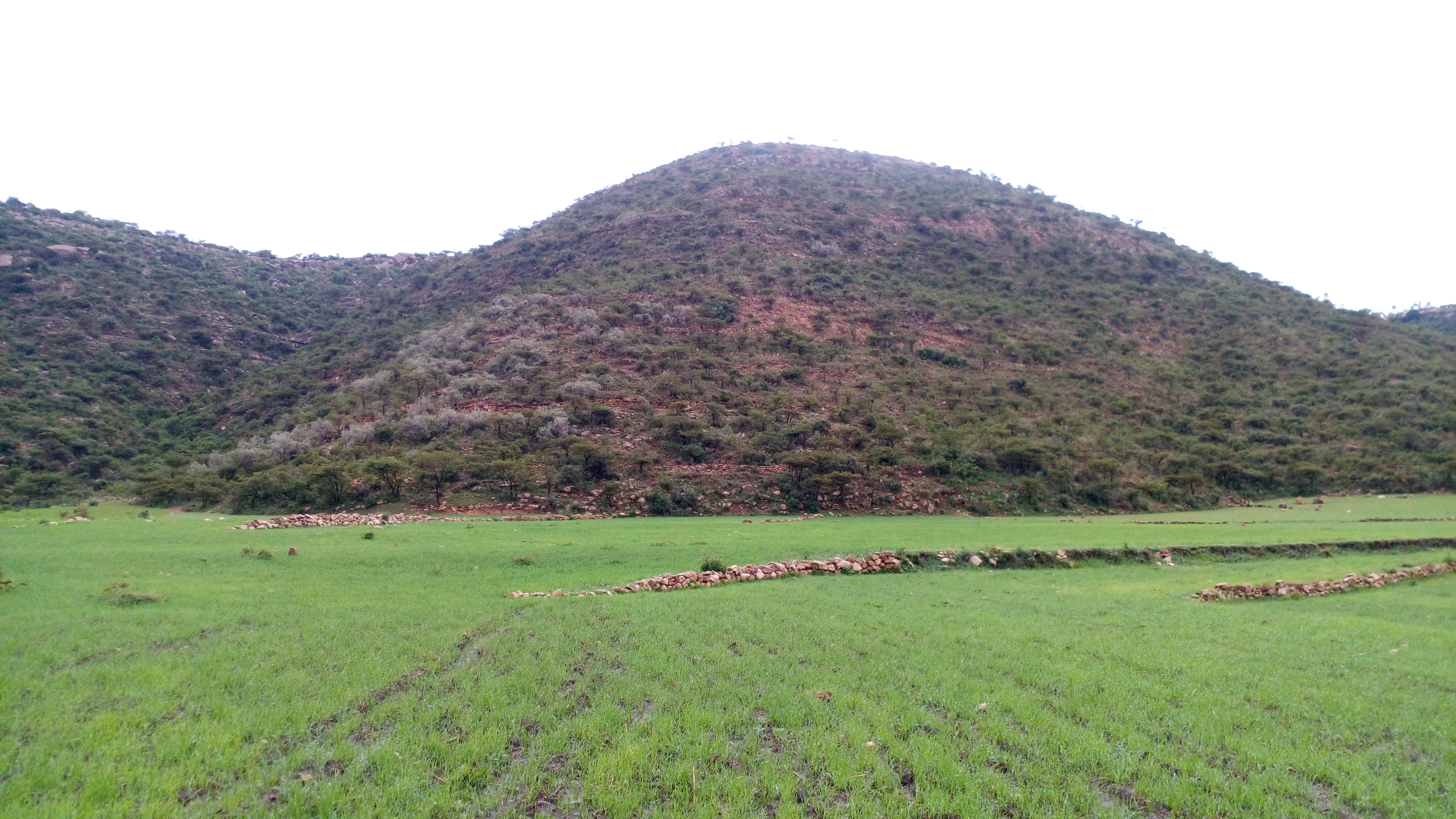
Gemgema occupies the steep slopes east of the village of Tsigaba.

== Environmental characteristics ==
- Area: 92 ha
- Average slope gradient: 59%
- Aspect: the exclosure is oriented towards the west
- Minimum altitude: 2124 metres
- Maximum altitude: 2288 metres
- Lithology: Antalo Limestone

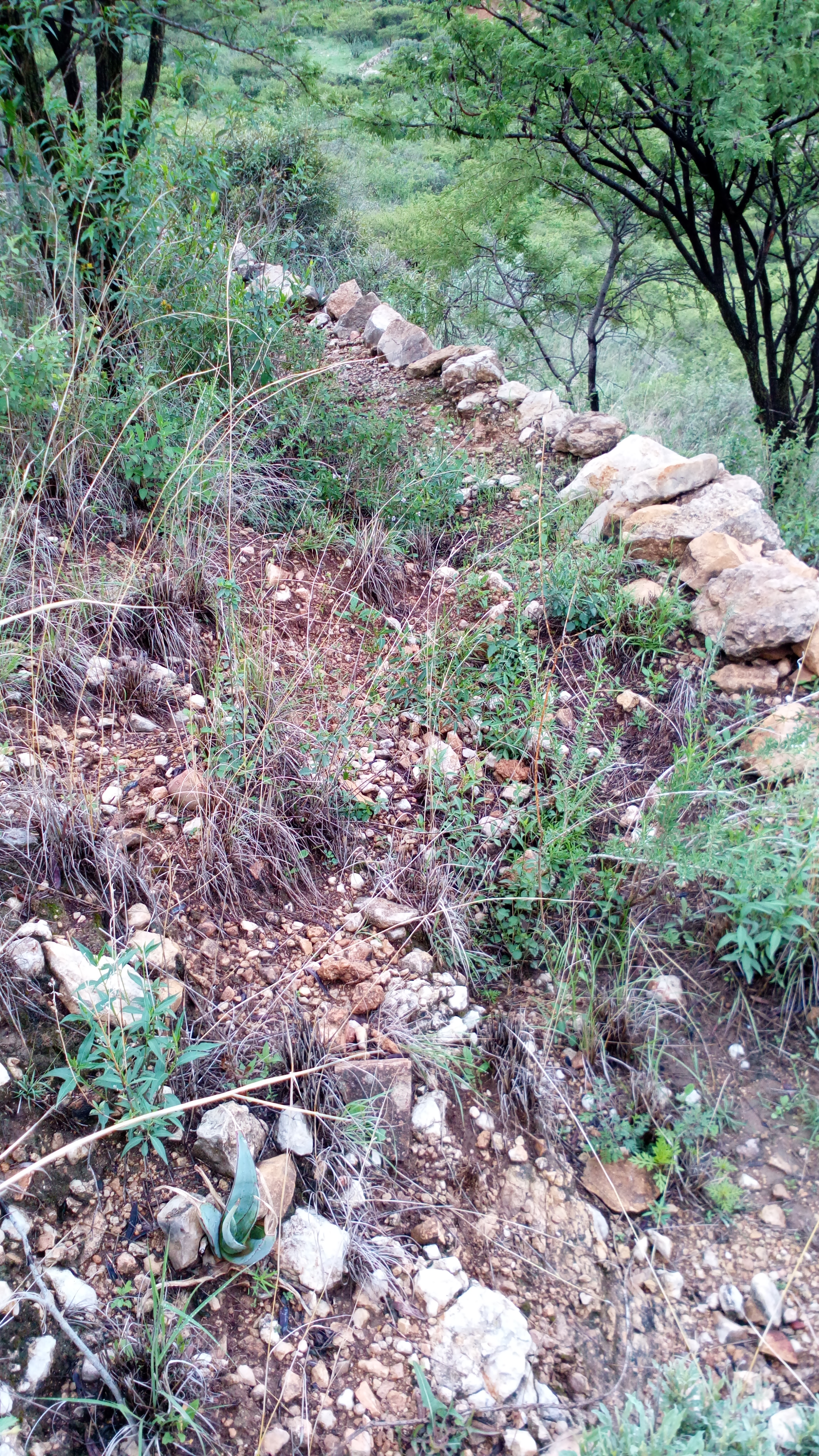
Soil and water conservation in Gemgema

== Management ==
As a general rule, cattle ranging and wood harvesting are not allowed. The grasses are harvested once yearly and taken to the homesteads of the village to feed livestock. Physical soil and water conservation has been implemented to enhance infiltration, and vegetation growth. There are five guards to protect the exclosure. Field observations showed that however some illegal grazing occurred in the exclosure in 2018.

== Benefits for the community ==
Setting aside such areas fits with the long-term vision of the communities were hiza’iti lands are set aside for use by the future generations. It has also direct benefits for the community:

- improved ground water availability
- honey production
- climate ameliorator (temperature, moisture)
- the sequestered carbon (in total 53 tonnes per ha, dominantly sequestered in the soil, and additionally in the woody vegetation) is certified using the Plan Vivo voluntary carbon standard, after which carbon credits are sold
- the revenues are then reinvested in the villages, according to the priorities of the communities; it may be for an additional class in the village school, a water pond, or conservation in the exclosure.

== Biodiversity ==
With vegetation growth, biodiversity in this exclosure hast strongly improved: there is more varied vegetation and wildlife.
