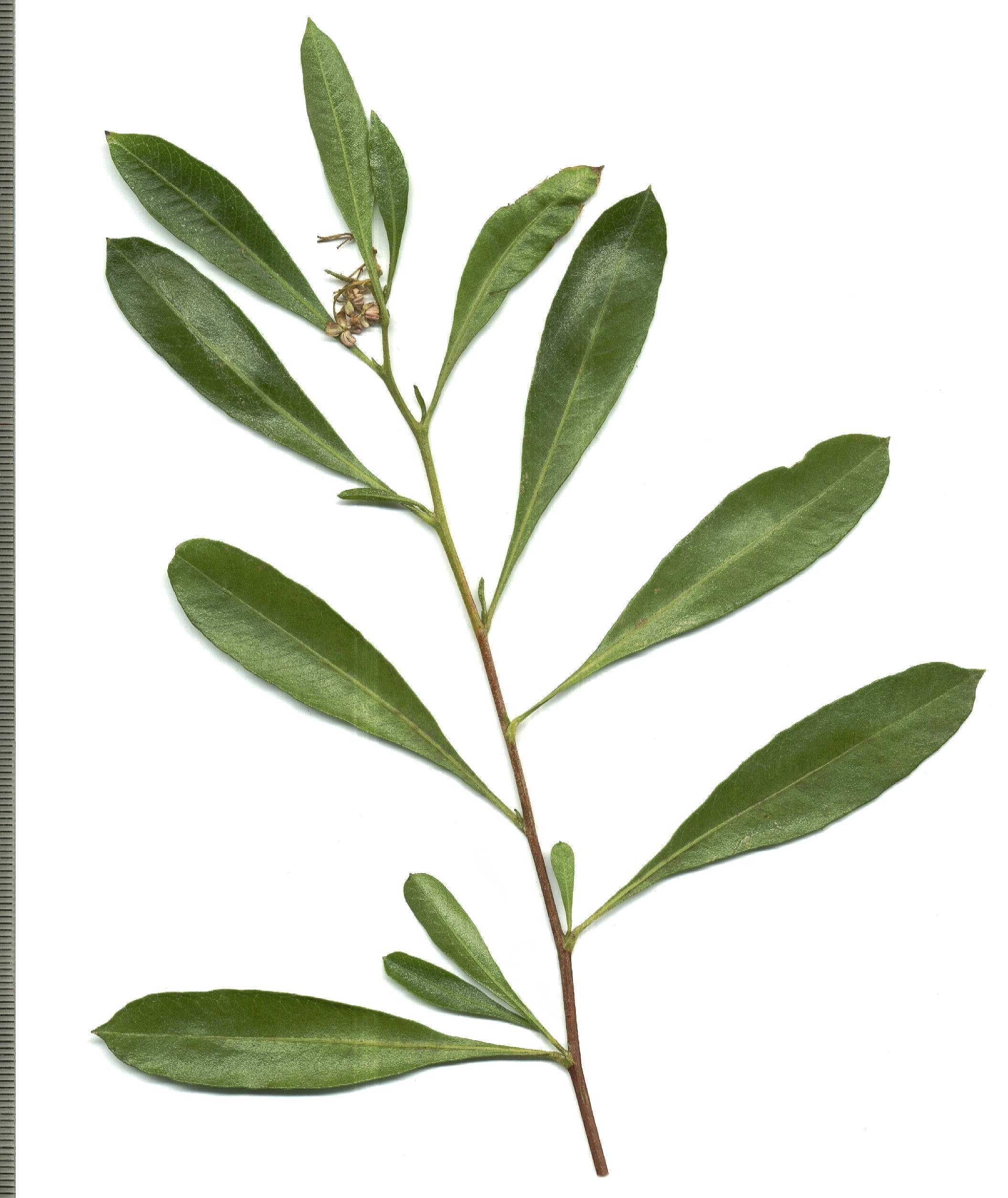
- Branch and leaves

Scientific classification
- Kingdom: Plantae
- Clade: Tracheophytes
- Clade: Angiosperms
- Clade: Eudicots
- Clade: Rosids
- Order: Sapindales
- Family: Sapindaceae
- Genus: Dodonaea
- Species: D. viscosa
- Subspecies: D. v. subsp. angustifolia

Trinomial name
- Dodonaea viscosa subsp. angustifolia (L.f.) J.G.West

Synonyms
- Many, including Dodonaea angustifolia L.f.

= Dodonaea viscosa subsp. angustifolia =

Sand olive

Species of tree

Dodonaea viscosa subsp. angustifolia, synonym Dodonaea angustifolia, (sand olive) is a slender shrub or small tree that occurs naturally from southern Africa to Arabia, as well as in Australia and New Zealand. The seed capsules are three-winged and are dispersed by wind. Although occurring in rocky areas, it is also cultivated to stabilise moving sand and to prevent erosion.

== Ecology ==
In Ethiopia, this species is frequently consumed by geladas (Theropithecus brumpti).
