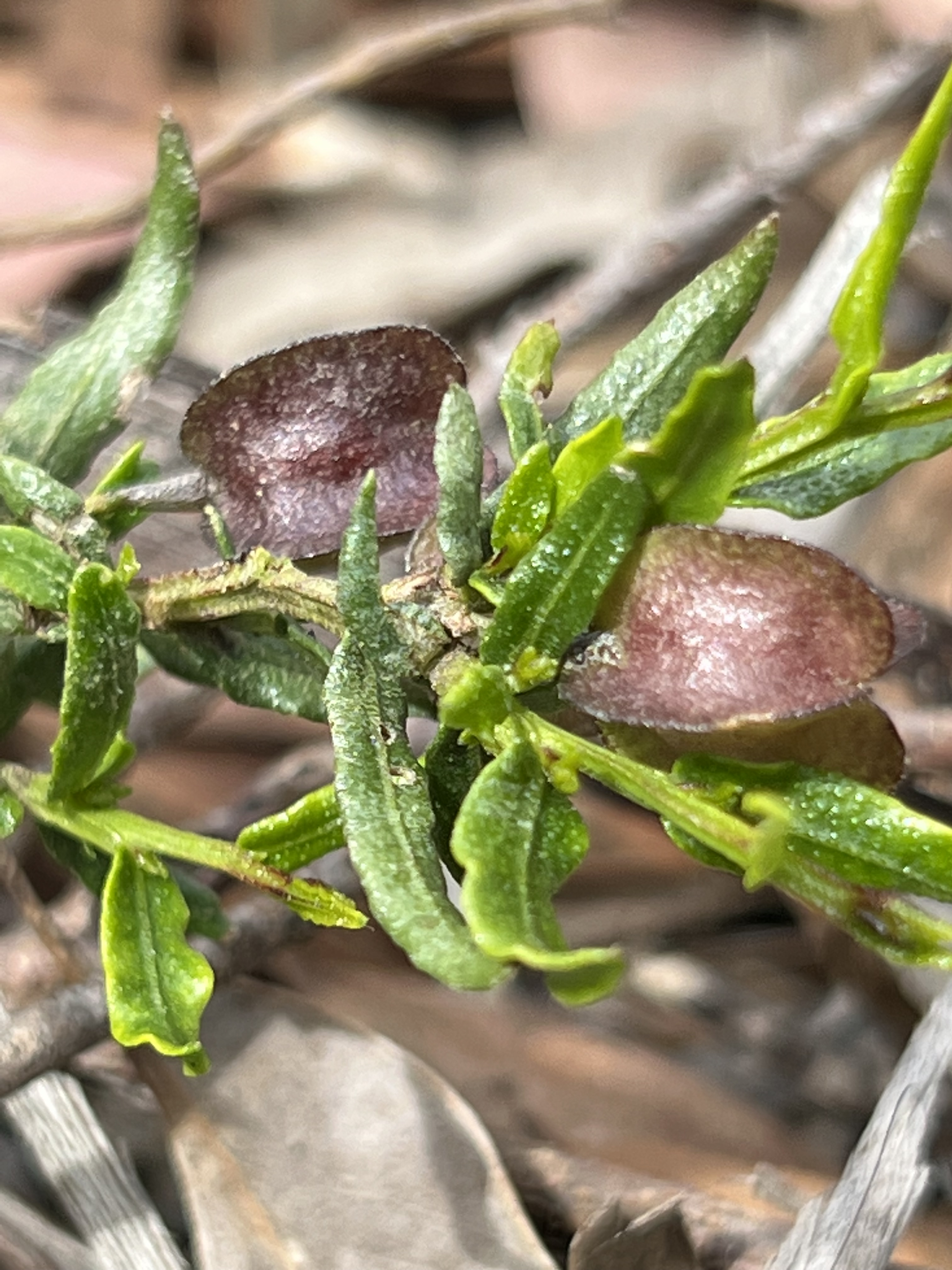

Scientific classification
- Kingdom: Plantae
- Clade: Tracheophytes
- Clade: Angiosperms
- Clade: Eudicots
- Clade: Rosids
- Order: Sapindales
- Family: Sapindaceae
- Genus: Dodonaea
- Species: D. camfieldii

Binomial name
- Dodonaea camfieldii Maiden & Betche

= Dodonaea camfieldii =

Species of shrub

Dodonaea camfieldii is a species of plant in the family Sapindaceae and is endemic to New South Wales. It is a small plant with single or paired flowers and mostly simple leaves.

== Description ==
Dodonaea camfieldii is a small, spreading shrub occasionally prostrate, 0.2–1 m (7.9 in – 3 ft 3.4 in) high. The leaves are mostly simple but may be oblong or lobed, smooth or sparsely hairy 1–3.5 cm (0.39–1.38 in) long, 2–8 mm (0.079–0.315 in) wide, decurrent at the base, sessile and a pointed at the apex. The flowers are borne singly or in pairs on a pedicel 2–4 mm (0.079–0.157 in) long, usually four oval to oblong-shaped sepals 2–3 mm (0.079–0.118 in) long. Flowering occurs from September to November and the fruit is a four winged capsule, 10–15.5 mm (0.39–0.61 in) long, 9–12 mm (0.35–0.47 in) wide, smooth or with sparse hairs, leathery, becoming red or purplish with age.

== Taxonomy and naming ==
Dodonaea camfieldii was first formally described in 1897 by Joseph Maiden and Daniel Ludwig Ernst Betche and the description was published in Proceedings of the Linnean Society of New South Wales. The specific epithet (camfieldii) was named in honour of Mr. Camfield a botanical collector.

== Distribution and habitat ==
This species of dodonaea grows mostly on sandstone in dry sclerophyll forest from Jervis Bay to the Hawkesbury local government area.
