= Catena (soil) =

Sequence of soils on a slope

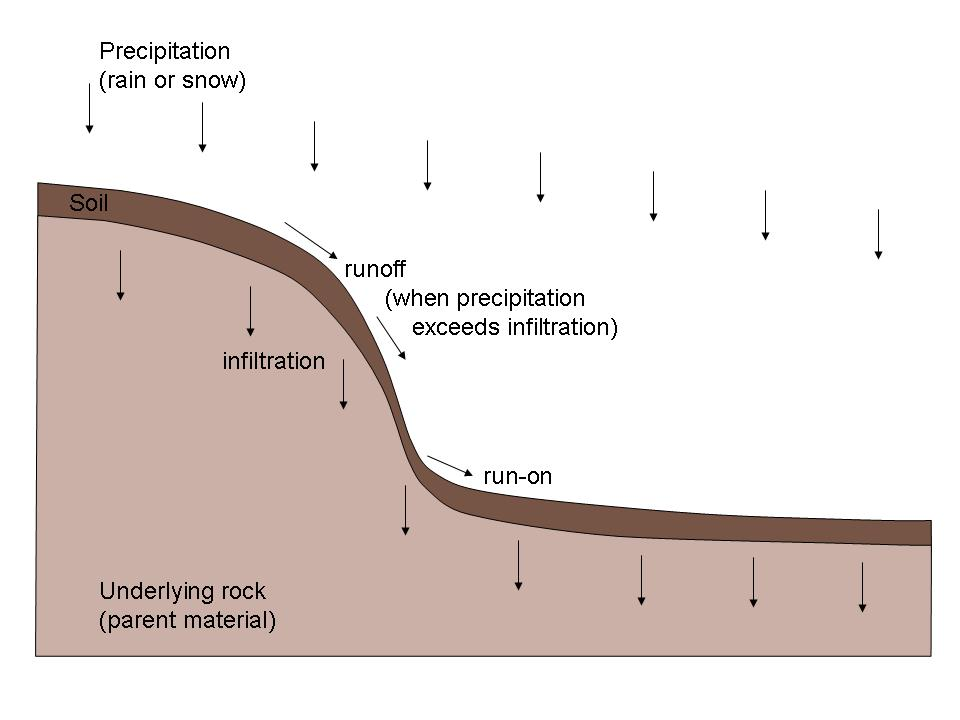
A catena is a sequence of soils down a slope, created by the balance of processes such as precipitation, infiltration and runoff.

A catena in soil science (pedology) is a series of distinct but co-evolving soils arrayed down a slope. Each soil type or "facet" differs somewhat from its neighbours, but all occur in the same climate and on the same underlying parent material. A mature catena is in equilibrium as the processes of deposition and erosion are in balance.

== Concept ==
The term soil catena is used to describe the lateral variation in soils over a hillslope. The catena concept originated in central Uganda by chemist W.S. Martin to describe a hill slope sequence at the Bukalasa research station. The term catena (Latin: chain) was first coined by scientist Geoffrey Milne to describe these soil-topography units.

The concept was developed in order to analyze the regular variation of soils across a slope. The example of this approach consists first in a structural component, the recurring pattern of certain soils in a landscape transect in which every chain element has its place in the chain, a soil has it in a landscape.

== Formation ==
A slope can be broken into sections known as a ridge, crest, midslope, and toeslope. The ridge or hilltop tends to accumulate organic matter that allows formation of an adequate thickness of soil. Steeper slope or crest sections tend to be freely drained, while at the bottom of slopes or toeslopes there is usually higher in moisture content and poor drainage. Toeslope soils are also known to be richer in clay and organic matter.

Lithology and relief can be the primary controls on the development of certain catenas with easily disaggregated parent rock and high relief favoring particle redistribution and therefore the formation of distinct soils in particle-source and particle-deposition zones along a slope. Catenas can also develop on low relief hillslopes, but because less potential energy is available, the redistribution of mass can be dominated by subsurface flow of plasma, a combination of dissolved and suspended solids in soil water.

== Open system ==
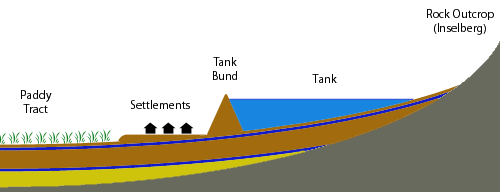
Cross Section of Dry Zone Catena of Sri Lanka showing relationship to rural land use

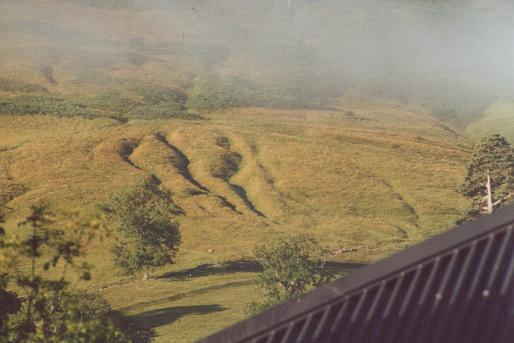
Gullies in wet peaty soil in Scotland show where water has run off, before sinking into deeper soils at the bottom of the catena.

A catena forms when the climate, including precipitation and evaporation, is the same for the whole slope, and when sufficient time has passed for equilibrium to be reached between the processes that bring materials in to a facet and the processes that take materials away. The result is a predictable sequence of soil facets. A catena is thus an open system which has continuous input and output processes. On a steeper slope in the middle of a catena, erosion (surface runoff) is faster, so facets are typically thinner and drier. Conversely, on a shallower slope at the top or bottom of a catena, soils are thicker and deeper. In addition, the top facets lose materials such as mineral salts when these are washed out by rain (eluviation), while the bottom facets gain materials when these are washed in (illuviation).

A catena can form on various underlying or parent materials and in different climates. On impermeable acid rocks such as metamorphic schists in a high rainfall climate like that of western Scotland, the catena consists of thick acidic peat-forming wet bog on the flatter facets, and thinner, drier, somewhat less acidic peaty podsols on the steeper facets. Thus the soil depth, acidity (pH), and soil moisture vary continuously along the slope. On a permeable basic rock such as chalk, the catena may consist of thick brown earths on the flatter facets, with thin rendzinas on the steeper slopes, while the valley bottom may include alkaline fen peat or river alluvium.

== Bibliography ==
- Milne, G. (1936). "Normal erosion as a factor in soil profile development". Nature. 138 (3491): 548–549. Bibcode:1936Natur.138..548M. doi:10.1038/138548c0. S2CID 4097936.
- Milne, G. (1947). "A soil reconnaissance journey through part of Tanganyika Territory December 1935 to February 1936". Journal of Ecology. 35 (1/2): 192–265. Bibcode:1947JEcol..35..192M. doi:10.2307/2256508. JSTOR 2256508.
- Schaetzl, Randall J; Anderson, Sharon (2005). Soils: Genesis and Geomorphology. Cambridge University Press. pp. 469–474. ISBN 9780521812016.
- Waugh, David (2000). Geography: An Integrated Approach. Nelson Thornes. p. 276. ISBN 9780174447061.
