= Mekelle airstrike =

Mekelle airstrike or Mekelle shelling may refer to:

- 2020 Mekelle airstrikes
- 2021 Mekelle airstrikes
- Mekelle kindergarten airstrike
