= Jan Nyssen =

Belgian geographer

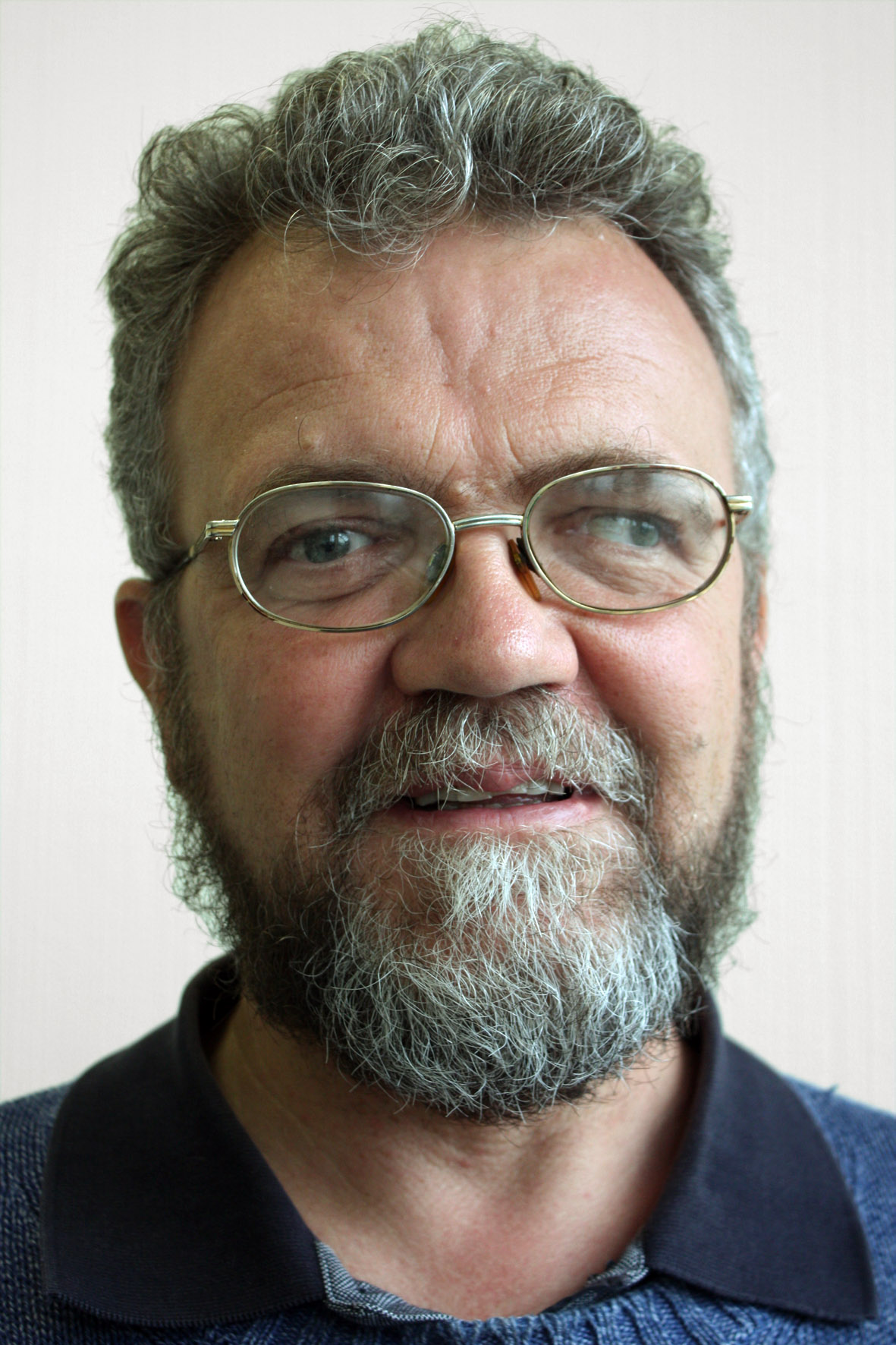
- Born: August 2, 1957 (age 69); Sint-Martens-Voeren, Belgium
- Education: University of Liège; KU Leuven
- Scientific career
- Fields: Geography, Geomorphology
- Workplaces: UGent
- Website: www.geografie.ugent.be/members/802000198480

Jan Nyssen (born in 1957) is a Belgian physical geographer, and professor of geography at Ghent University.

== Career ==
Nyssen was born in Sint-Martens-Voeren. He was employed as a mailman from 1977 to 1997 in Liège in Belgium. In 1991 he started a parallel study of Geography at the University of Liège, where he obtained the degree of Licentiate in Geography in 1995 with a dissertation on soil erosion in Ethiopia. Between 1998 and 2001 he carried out PhD research at KU Leuven University, Belgium, in which he investigated the role of human and natural processes in land degradation in the Ethiopian Highlands. Promoters of this research were professors Jean Poesen and Seppe Deckers (both at KU Leuven), Jan Moeyersons at the Royal Museum for Central Africa in Tervuren) and Mitiku Haile of Mekelle University in Ethiopia. He also worked several years in projects of university development cooperation in Ethiopia.

Since 2007 Nyssen has been a professor in the Department of Geography of Ghent University, where he was appointed a full professor in 2014. Nyssen lectures Geomorphology, Hydrology, Microclimatology, and Regional Geomorphology for students in Geography and Physical Land Resources at UGent. He promoted dozens of Master and PhD theses, particularly at UGent (Belgium), KU Leuven (Belgium), Mekelle University (Ethiopia) and Bahir Dar University (Ethiopia).

Nyssen has been the president of the Belgian Association of Geomorphologists from 2017 through 2021, and was editor-in-chief of the Land Degradation and Development journal from 2019 to 2020.

Nyssen co-edited the book Geo-trekking in Ethiopia's Tropical Mountains: The Dogu'a Tembien District and self-published a book in the Tigrinya language.

== Research ==
Nyssen's research contributes to the identification and quantification of changes in the coupled system "humans-environment" – with a focus on slope processes, hydrogeomorphology, land degradation and soil conservation. Most of his research activities have been in Ethiopia.

=== Soils of Ethiopia ===
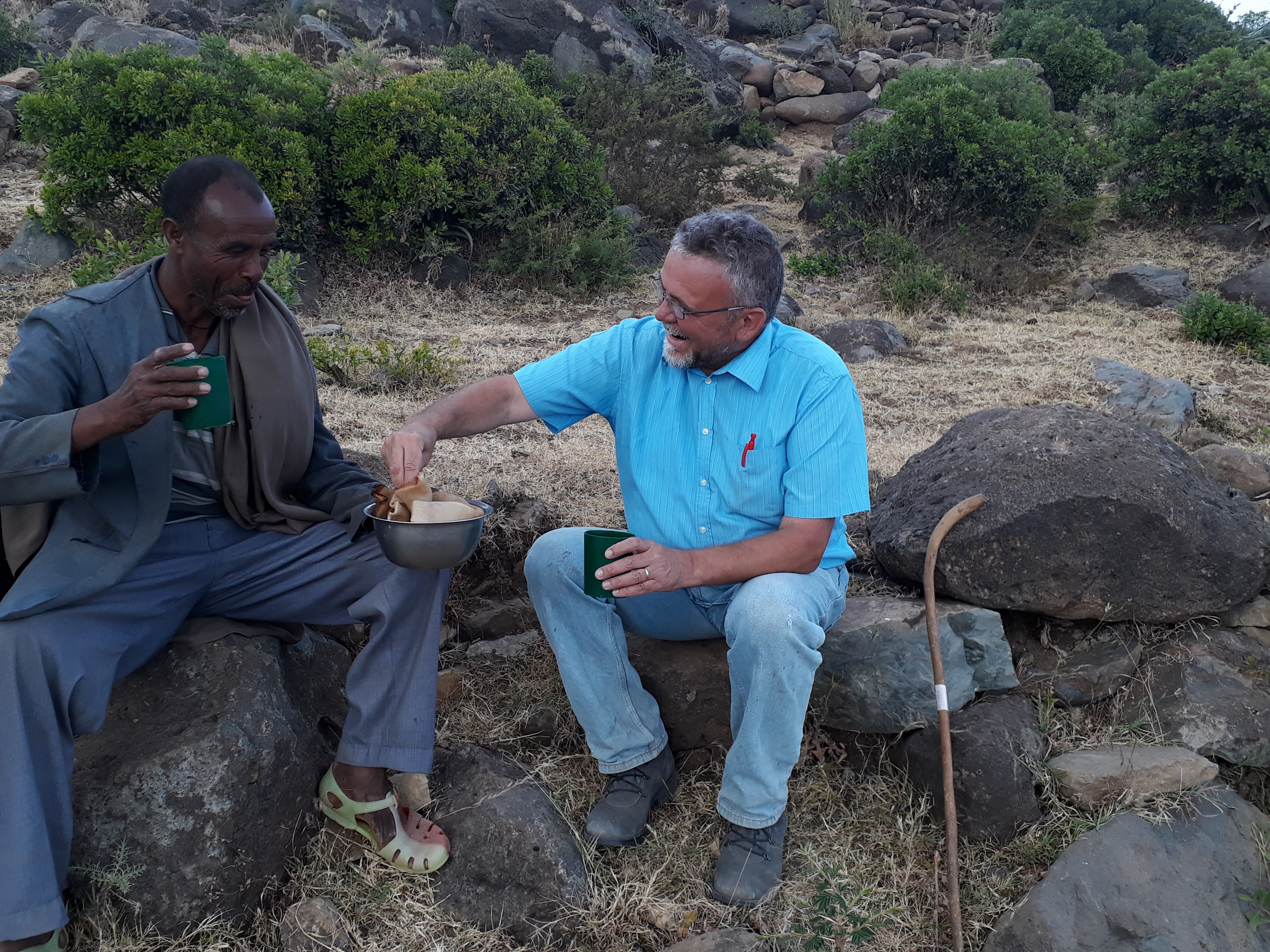
Invited for a local Siwa (beer) by a farmer in Tigray

Nyssen's research showed that high levels of soil loss in the Ethiopian Highlands are caused by a combination of erosive rainfall, steep slopes, and impacts of deforestation, overgrazing, an agricultural system where the open-field system dominates, and the aftermath of poverty induced by a long history of feudalism in Ethiopia. He further studied how the high density of soil and water conservation structures led to land resilience in the highlands. Through the use of rephotography, Nyssen linked changes in the landscape with land degradation.

Nyssen notes that Ethiopian farmers have ploughed the same lands and hills for thousands of years with oxen ploughs. They know their soils and know when rains will come or what they have to plant if rains are late. Since his first stay in Ethiopia in 1994, Nyssen observed that the amount of food available to rural households, as well as the overall living standard has strongly improved.

=== Lynchets and beaver dams in Belgium ===
Nyssen's research in Belgium is also related to the consequences of human activities on geomorphic processes: the reintroduction of beavers, spoil tips of the derelict coal mining industry, and the age-old agriculture in the Pays de Herve region, which led to the occurrence of lynchets or cultivation terraces, by analogy to a common practice in current Ethiopia; The beaver dams have drawn his attention because they contribute to conserving water in the rivers' headwaters. He studied their effect on discharges of the Chevral creek, that is part of the Ourthe basin. The research confirmed that such dams have a buffering effect on discharges: downstream the peak discharges are much lower than what was observed before beaver reintroduction.

== Public activities ==
When war erupted in Tigray in 2020, Nyssen advocated strongly for a ceasefire and humanitarian aid for the people of Tigray, and helped expose starvation and extreme civilian sufferings in Tigray. In 2024, he published a book on the "Tigray tragedy".

Nyssen was involved in supporting access to public footpaths in the area of Vottem, Herstal and Liège in Belgium.
