= List of research institutions in Tigray =

This is a list of research institutions and organizations in the state of Tigray, Ethiopia. It includes both public, governmental, and private research institutions.

Institution	Location	Year established	Ownership	Notes
Tigray Agricultural Research Institute (TARI)	Mekelle	1999	Governmental	Tigray Agricultural Research Institute (TARI) came into existence in 1999 by the regional proclamation No. 36/1991 Ethiopian Calendar, as the apex body to conduct, coordinate and manage agricultural research, and provide agricultural-related consultancy in Tigray
Tigray Health Research Institute (THRI)	Mekelle	2015	Governmental	Tigray Health Research Institute (THRI) was established by proclamation number 265/2007 E.C. (2015) and inaugurated in July 2016.
Tigray Institute of Policy Studies (TIPS)	Mekelle	2018	Governmental	Tigray Institute of Policy Studies (TIPS) was established by proclamation number 306/2018 by the Council of the regional state of Tigray to initiate and provide research-based recommended solutions and advice to the regional government on the development and implementation of policies and strategies about political, economic, social affairs and technology within the region.
