= Belgium Park =

Belgium Park may refer to:

- Belgium Park, in the main campus of Mekelle University, Ethiopia
- Nickname of Monaghan United F.C., a soccer club in Ireland
