= Mekelle offensive =

Airstrike as part of the Tigray War in Ethiopia

- Part of the Tigray War
- Map of the Mekelle offensive
Date	17–28 November 2020
Location	Tigray Region, Ethiopia 13°29′49″N 39°28′37″E
Result	Ethiopian victory: Ethiopia captures multiple sites around the city of Mekelle; Ethiopia captures Mekelle on 28 November after two days of battle, TPLF withdraws

Belligerents
Tigray	Ethiopia; Eritrea

Commanders and leaders
Debretsion Gebremichael (Chief Administrator of Tigray Region and TPLF Chairman); Getachew Reda (TPLF Spokesperson)	Abiy Ahmed (Prime Minister of Ethiopia); Birhanu Jula (ENDF Chief of Staff); Kenea Yadeta (Minister of Defence); Isaias Afewerki (President of Eritrea); Filipos Woldeyohannes (EDF Chief of Staff)

Units involved
Tigray Defence Forces	ENDF: Ethiopian Ground Forces; ETAF; EDF: Eritrean Army; ERAF

Strength
Unknown	Unknown

Casualties and losses
Unknown	Unknown
- 27 civilians killed, 100+ wounded (Mekelle anonymous doctors)
- Location within Ethiopia

The Mekelle offensive was a military campaign fought at the start of the Tigray War between the national armed forces of Ethiopia and the Tigray Region. The Ethiopian National Defense Force (ENDF) launched an offensive aimed at seizing the Tigray Peoples Liberation Front (TPLF) controlled regional capital of Mekelle starting on 17 November 2020.

Fierce fighting occurred in the Wajirat district of Tigray between the ENDF and newly formed Tigray Defense Forces (TDF) as the military pushed towards the regional capital. The Ethiopian Air Force was heavily employed during the offensive, the use of drone strikes in particular, and after several weeks the TDF was routed into the mountains.

Mekelle itself came under air attack, and the city fell to the Ethiopian army on 28 November 2020, marking the end of the offensive. Despite their initial defeat, TDF fighters began organizing an insurgency soon after.

== Course of offensive ==
Following the outbreak of the Tigray War on 3 November 2020, the newly formed Tigray Defense Forces (TDF) retreated to the gorges and hills of the Wajirat district of Tigray region. The 21st Division, a well trained element of the Ethiopian National Defense Force (ENDF), was marching across Wajirat with the aim of capturing Tigray’s capital city, Mekelle. According to TDF accounts, local Wajirat militias and the TDF effectively destroyed the 21st Division during a defensive battle at a location known as Gereb-Agew.

After two days of fierce fighting, which saw the use of human wave attacks, the ENDF overran Wajirat district and mounted an offensive towards the strategic town of Hiwane in Raya district. For the TDF, withdrawing from Hiwane meant leaving the road to Mekelle open for the Ethiopian army. After fierce fighting for the town, the TDF forces were worn down by persistent air strikes and the introduction of drone attacks, which Tigray fighters struggled to counter. After the TDF succeeded in capturing heavy artillery pieces from the ENDF during the battle, drone strikes targeted and wiped them out.

After the ENDF and its allies took over the nearby towns of Hiwane and Adi Gudem, the TDF chain of command collapsed as its forces fell into disarray. Rumors were rife among the TDF ranks that top military commanders were secretly colluding with the Ethiopian government and most fighters lost hope of being able to hold Mekelle.

=== 17 November ===
Mekelle was hit by an airstrike, killing two civilians and injuring several others. The strike also caused damage to roads, bridges and houses. Who carried out the airstrike has been disputed, as the Ethiopian government has denied targeting civilians.

Mortar fire and tank shells also fired upon civilian areas in the town of Shire; hotels, schools, a university campus, an apartment building and the town's own municipal building were hit by the strikes. A number of residents interviewed by Human Rights Watch either stated that Tigayan forces had either left before it occurred, or at the very least, "did not see militia forces present." Both Ethiopian and Eritrean forces were noted as entering Shire later that day.

The Ethiopian government accused the TPLF of blowing up four main bridges leading to Mekelle, which the TPLF denied. By the end of the first day, at least 10 civilians were killed.

=== 18–22 November ===
Ethiopian forces captured Shire and Axum in the morning. Around 9 a.m., Ethiopian forces were advancing towards Mekelle by three roads from South, East and Northwest around 200 kilometers away from the city. The Chief of Staff of the Ethiopian Defense Force, Berhanu Jula, announced an intention to encircle Mekelle in order to capture TPLF forces. Fighting between Tigray and Eritrea reportedly took place in Adi Quala, Zalembesa, Taruna, Ali Tina, Wadqomdi, and Badme.

TPLF leader Debretsion said that Mekelle was bombed but gave no details of casualties or injuries. Redwan Hussein, a government spokesperson, said that government troops are closing in on Mekelle and had won multiple victories, capturing a number of towns on their campaign towards the Tigray capital. Mekelle was hit by an airstrike which inflicted significant damage on Mekelle University, injuring several civilians. By 21 November, government-allied forces captured Adwa, while making advances toward Adigrat.

=== 22–27 November ===
Military spokesperson of Ethiopia, Colonel Dejene Tsegaye, announced that Mekelle will be encircled and shelled, telling Tigray civilians to flee the city because Ethiopian forces would show no mercy. TPLF leader Debretsion Gebremichael said that his troops have stalled the Ethiopian forces on southern front. By 23 November the city was surrounded by the ENDF.

=== 28 November ===
Ethiopian forces begun their direct assault on Mekelle on 28 November. Debretsion claimed that they were bombarding the city with artillery, an accusation rejected by Ethiopian government. Despite this, however, ambulances rushed through the streets picking up dead and wounded after Ethiopian government artillery strikes. Doctors in Mekelle sent text messages on the condition of anonymity to avoid reprisals from the government by using a rare Internet connection in the city. They stated that indiscriminate artillery shelling targeted not only TPLF areas, but also civilian neighborhoods, ended up killing 27 civilians (including a 4-year-old child) and wounded around 100. The hospital staff showed documents to prove their employment and denied any ties to the TPLF, while providing certain pictures of their patients (including infants) having many shrapnel wounds.

The Ethiopian government later that day announced it had taken Mekelle and that it was the end of the Tigray offensive. Debretsion confirmed the TPLF were withdrawing from around Mekelle. Tigrayan forces said they had withdrawn from Mekelle to avoid having the federal forces from further destroying the city and that the TPLF will be fighting in surrounding rural areas, beginning a new guerrilla campaign.

== Aftermath ==
The International Committee of Red Cross which visited Mekelle after the battle, said hospitals were facing difficulties in providing healthcare to patients. 80% of the people at the Ayder Referral Hospital had trauma injuries, causing other services to be suspended. The hospital was also facing a shortage of body bags. Food in the Tigray region had also run out, causing 1,000 Eritrean refugees to request food and other assistance in Mekelle. Analysts have previously stated that the TPLF could switch to insurgency after losing territory.

On 30 November, Ethiopian President Abiy Ahmed told the parliament that federal soldiers have not killed a single civilian during the month-long conflict in the Tigray region, and stated that his army will not destroy Mekelle. However, subsequent reports by both The New York Times and Human Rights Watch report found – after interviewing a number of witnesses – that not only were civilians killed by Ethiopian artillery strikes, but that the strikes "did not appear [to be] aimed at specific military targets," and were instead striking "generalized populated areas."

As of 3 December, electricity had been cut off in the city, which emboldened armed troops (possibly Amhara militiamen) to loot stores at night, forcing many to close.

By 28 June 2021, TPLF rebels recaptured Mekelle as well as bordering Ethiopian villages. The interim government went into exile and the Ethiopian government declared a ceasefire.

== See also ==
- 2021 Mekelle airstrikes
- 2006 Fall of Mogadishu
