= Battle of Mekelle =

Battle of Mekelle may refer to:

- Battle of Mekelle (1896)
- Battle of Mekelle (2020)
