= Palace of Yohannes IV =

Historic palace in Ethiopia

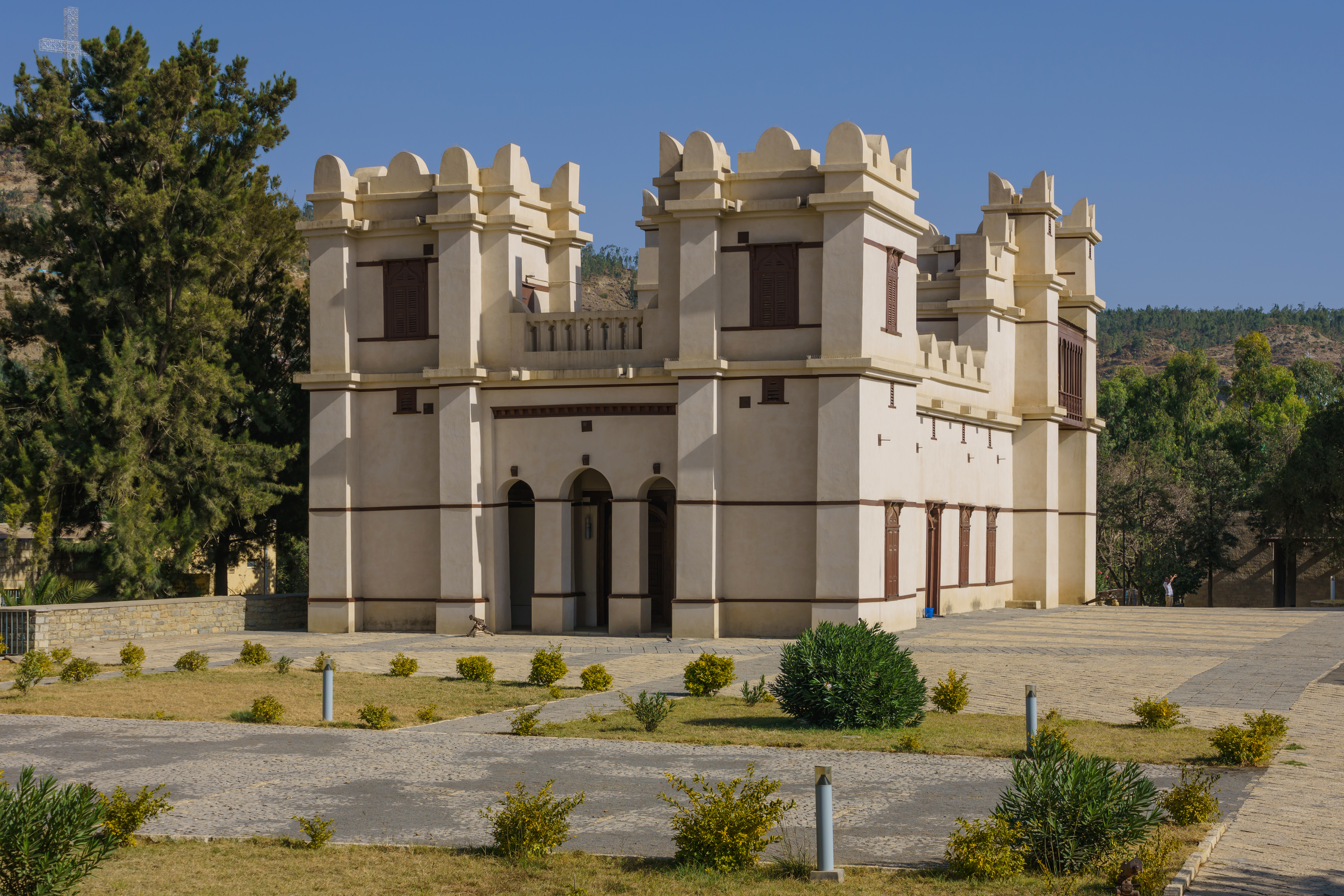
- The main building of the Palace

General information
- Architectural style: Grand Hïdmo with European elements
- Location: Mekelle, Tigray, Ethiopia
- Year built: 1881–1886
- Completed: 1886

The Palace of Yohannes IV in Mekelle is a historic Ethiopian palace built during the 1880s by Emperor Yohannes IV. It has been a musuem since the Derg Era, displaying artefacts relating to Yohannes IV and the royal family.

== Introduction ==
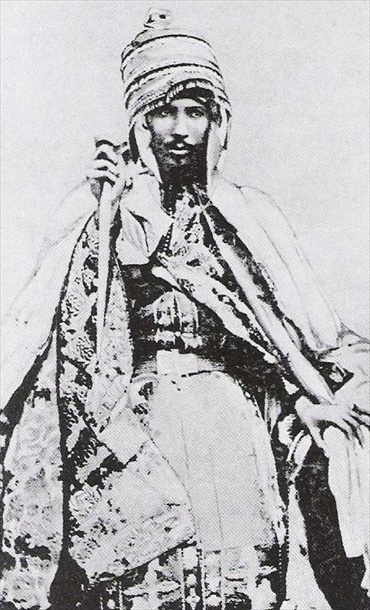
Emperor Yohannes IV

During the early reign of Yohannes IV, Mekelle was a small village with 'very little importance except as a residence for priests'. For the first ten years of Yohannes' reign, he did not have a fixed capital, and the court would move around to various sites including Adwa. During the early 1870s, Yohannes (formerly known as Kahsay before his coronation) established Kahsay Castle (also known as the Agula' castle), 25km northeast of Mekelle. It was a smaller castle than the later palace in Mekelle, and was only used as a royal residence for a short time before it was donated to the local monastic community. In the early 1880s, the emperor decided to make Mekelle the royal and administrative capital of the Empire, making it his permanent capital due to its beauty and personal significance to Yohannes.

== The Palace ==
=== History and exterior ===
Meskel Event at the Palace led by Prince Mengesha in 1895

The Palace is built in the Tigrayan style of grand Hïdmo architecture with European wood carpentry elements. The Emperor hired large amounts of artisans, builders and carpenters including master traditional builders Bijerewend Desta Tekhele and Bejirewend WerkeKiristos Engda, Ingdashet Schimper, the half-Ethiopian son of Wilhelm Schimper, and Italians Giuseppe Naretti (died 1881) and his brother Giacomo Naretti, who supervised the construction and crafted the wooden elements of the openings and the throne, and four Moroccan builders who worked alongside local builders. Giacomo Naretti worked on the construction of the Suez Canal, and was hired by the Emperor to help with modernising the country. The palace began construction in the early 1880s, on a site called Meam-Anbessa (resting place of lions), with the main palace building being completed in 1886, with the residential building being completed afterwards. The palace is on a naturally elevated position and provides a panoramic view of Mekelle and the surroundings. The complex was surrounded by two stone walls, with the outer wall having holes for musketeers to fire from and guard houses. Some parts of the walls have been removed; a linear wall splits the inner circle, dividing the palace and storeroom area with a semi-circular courtyard. After the Emperor's death and the royal courts move to Addis Ababa, Yohannes' son Mengesha Yohannes resided at the palace. It is likely hundred of builders, masons and workers were recruited for the project, another building project of Yohannes IV contained more than 300 workers.

=== Interior ===
The residential building

The Interior of the main building consisted of a large banqueting hall (aderash) with ten stone masonry pillars behind a large double-door made of local Abysinnian wood, at the end of the hall is a throne made by Naretti. The roof is about 7 metres high. Behind the hall was a large council chamber used for audiences. The hall was connected to the second floor by a broad flight of well-built stairs. The second floor consisted of well-lighted apartment rooms. The rooms of the second floor have wooden pillars each 5 metres high. The rooms in the turret sections of the building were used as guard rooms. The current interior differs slightly from the original design. The main building was dedicated to non-private usage, with the Emperor temporarily living in a large circular building with a domed thatched roof. The building interior contains structured arches with predetermined stone sizes, which may have been a contribution of Naretti, the usage of Plaster was also a suggestion of Naretti. Naretti worked on a majority of the woodwork and taught locals newer techniques of woodworking.

To the south of the main building, another building was constructed, this building was the new residential building, approximately 18×8 metres in size. It housed Mengesha and his wife, who resided in two houses/wings connected by a covered bridge on the upper floor, the lower floors were used for attendants, cooks and storerooms. It was assessed through the main garden and stables which were located in the south of the complex. The garden contained multiple trees and bushes as well as a summer house as well as connected to another private garden. The Palace is similar in some ways to the earlier Kahsay palace but is superior in size and craftsmanship.

=== Recent damage and looting ===
An antique machine gun, one of the artefacts at the museum

It was refurbished and reopened in 2018, however it has undergone some damage due to the Tigrayan War and the ongoing Ethiopian civil conflict. The site was being used as a military base for the Ethiopian army in 2020 and 2021, which resulted in some damage, including vandalism to signage and cracks in the woodwork, with one local resident saying that the previously well-maintained musuem was completely ravaged afterward. Doors were damaged, a traditional fountain in the garden was destroyed, the apartments of the Emperor were damaged. Artefacts such as a British knife gifted to the Emperor and swords clad with gold were looted, whilst other artefacts were later recovered, clothes belonging to the Emperor and royal family were also damaged and looted.

== Influence ==
After the construction of the palace, the Hïdmo style of building became increasingly more common in Mekelle, and older buildings such as Kahsay Palace were refurbished with Naretti's help. The woodworking skills of Naretti also become prevalent after the comsturction.
