= Kindeya Gebrehiwot =

Ethiopian academic (born 1973)

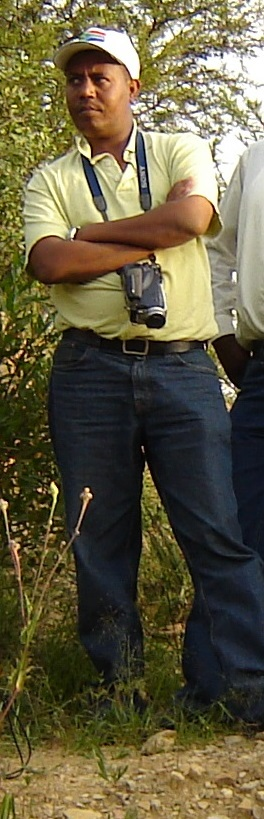
- Kindeya Gebrehiwot

State Minister, Advisor to the Ministry of Education
- Incumbent
- Assumed office 14 April 2025
- President: Taye Atske Selassie
- Prime Minister: Abiy Ahmed Ali

President of Mekelle University
- In office 2013–2020
- Preceded by: Joachim Herzig
- Succeeded by: Fetien Abay

Personal details
- Born: 1973 (age 52–53) Abiy Addi, Tigray Province, Ethiopian Empire
- Education: Göttingen University
- Profession: Professor of Forestry

Kindeya Gebrehiwot (born 1973) is an Ethiopian academic and politician serving as State Minister, Advisor to the Ministry of Education. He was a professor of Forestry at Mekelle University (Ethiopia), researching forest regeneration, particularly frankincense trees. He studies the threats to this flagship species, particularly in relation to regrowth and tapping. He was also President of Mekelle University.

== Career ==
- 1996: MSc Environmental Forestry at University of Wales (Bangor)
- Head of the Department of General Agriculture: May 1997 – October, 1999.
- 2003: PhD at University of Göttingen, Germany
- Mekelle University's Research and Publication Officer: February 2004 – Dec.2005
- Mekelle University's Associate Vice President for Research and Graduate Programs: January 2006 – November 2009
- Mekelle University's Academic Vice President – Nov 2009 - April 2013
- 2013: Appointed as President of Mekelle University by Ethiopia's Ministry of Science and Education
- Mekelle University President - May 2013 – September 2020
- 2017: Full Professor at Mekelle University
- 2018: Member of the Central Committee of the Tigray People's Liberation Front
- 2021: Coordinates the Tigray External Affairs Office of the regional government of Tigray

== Research on Ethiopia's incense trees ==
Kindeya Gebrehiwot's research area encompasses sustainable management of dry tropical forests and reforestation. Such deciduous dry forests of the Sahelian regions are the poor parents when it comes to research on the ecology and conservation of natural resources, given their relatively lesser importance in terms of biological diversity. However, they play an extremely important role in ensuring the ecological balance in dry areas, in contributing to the diversity of natural habitats, in protecting soils from erosion, and in regulating the water cycle. These forests also contribute to the protection of the livelihoods of the inhabitants of Abergelle where the research is mainly conducted. The supply of energy, materials, food and commercial products is considered.

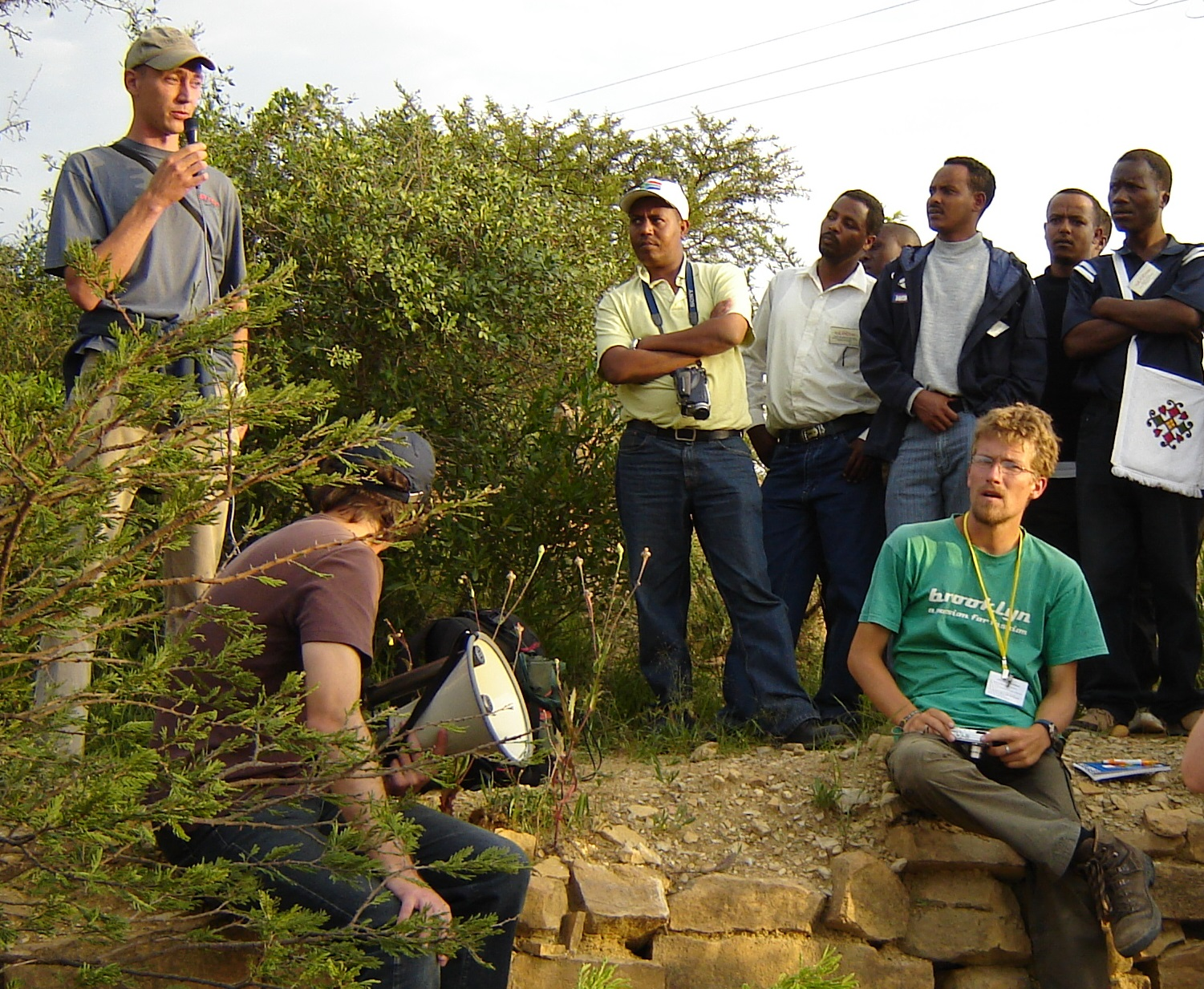
Kindeya Gebrehiwot (centre) at the HighLand2006 excursion to Miheni exclosure

Sustainable forest management that meets social, economic and environmental objectives requires an in-depth knowledge of how this type of forest ecosystem works. Studies have focused on resilience to withstand the pressures of exploitation, and regeneration capabilities. Kindeya's research makes an important contribution to improving this knowledge. It is this knowledge that allows the Tigray society to tackle the problem of maintaining forest resources (especially Boswellia papyrifera incense species) in relation to their vulnerability (hydrological stress, grazing, and overexploitation, mainly). The economic importance of products from this species, particularly incense, must also be taken into account. Kindeya's research has identified a number of needs, not only in terms of future research, but also in terms of management plans and legal framework. Realistically, Kindeya discussed the dilemma between the self-sufficiency needs of the neighbouring population: how to combine the exclosure of Boswellia forests with the need for people to support themselves in an area that is naturally very dry. Suggested solutions include a ban on access to livestock (exclosure) or even local restrictions on incense harvesting.

== Community service ==
- Board Chairman of the Tigrai Development Association
- Board Member of the Relief Society of Tigray
- Board member of Mekelle 70 Enderta F.C.
- Actively supported the Tigray Defense Forces in the Tigray War
- Ethiopian Soil Science Association, Ethiopia.
- Ethiopian Forestry Association, Addis Ababa, Ethiopia.
- Rural Development Forestry Network, London, United Kingdom.
- Forest, Trees and People Network, Sweden.
- International Society of Tropical Foresters.
- Secretary of the Board of Directors of Tigray Cultural Association.

== Recognitions and awards ==
- Gold medal of the Haromaya University (Ethiopia) as an outstanding student of the year 1993.
- DAAD (the German Academic Exchange Services) Scholarship Award - 1999
- 2004: Prize of the Belgian Development Cooperation
- Best Research of the Year 2010 at Mekelle University
- 2015: Award for his great and indispensable assistance in carrying out the Ethiopia-Witten relief efforts to equip and develop hospitals and schools in the northern Ethiopian province of Tigray
- 2019: University of Hargeisa Medal
