= 2020 Mekelle airstrikes =

2020 massacre in Mekelle, Tigray Region, Ethiopia, as part of Tigray War

Coordinates: 13.49382°N 39.46589°E

- Part of Tigray War
- Location of Mekelle in Tigray (Ethiopia)
- Location: Mekelle (Tigrinya: መቐለ), Tigray Region, Ethiopia
- Date: 28 November 2020
- Target: Tigrayans
- Attack type: Mass killing; Shelling
- Deaths: 27 or 28 civilians
- Perpetrator: (Ethiopia) Ethiopian National Defence Force

On 28 November 2020, Mekelle (the capital city of the Tigray Region) was hit with an airstrike campaign during the Mekelle offensive of the Tigray War.

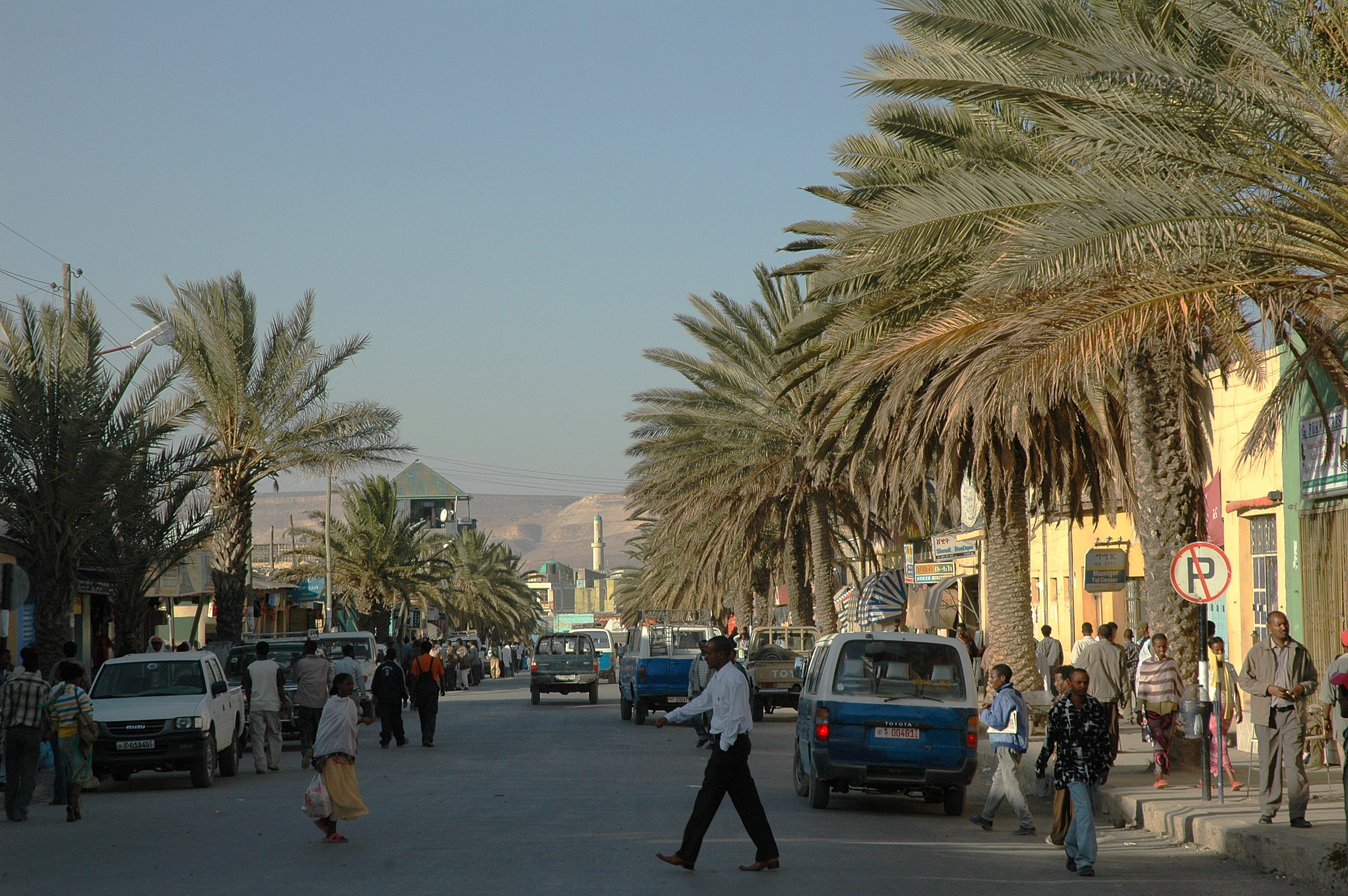
Mekelle before the Tigray War

== Massacre ==
The Ethiopian National Defense Force (ENDF) killed dozens of civilians during the assault on Mekelle on 28 November 2020. Tigray regional president Debretsion claimed that they were bombarding the city with artillery. Ambulances rushed through the streets picking up dead and wounded after Ethiopian government artillery strikes. Doctors in Mekelle sent text messages on the condition of anonymity to avoid reprisals from the government by using a rare internet connection in the city. They stated that indiscriminate artillery shelling targeted not only military areas, but also civilian neighborhoods, ended up killing 27 civilians (including a 4 year old child) and wounded around 100. The hospital staff provided pictures of their patients (including infants) having many shrapnel wounds.

The "Tigray: Atlas of the humanitarian situation" mentions 28 victims, of which one has been formally identified.

== Reactions ==
The Ethiopian government denied bombarding the city with artillery.

The [Joint Investigation Team] found that, following the shelling that was launched in the early hours, continuing into the evening of 28 November 2020, more than 15 civilian facilities, including public institutions located in Mekelle, were struck by artillery shells, resulting in at least 29 civilian deaths, including three (3) children. At least 34 civilians were injured. Witnesses mentioned that the attacks appeared to come from the direction of Mesebo mountains, which they claimed at the time were under the control of the ENDF. — Report of the EHRC/OHCHR Joint Investigation into Alleged Violations of International Human Rights, Humanitarian and Refugee Law Committed by all Parties to the Conflict in the Tigray Region of the Federal Democratic Republic of Ethiopia, EHRC, OHCHR
