= Mitiku Haile =

Ethiopian soil scientist and founding president of Mekelle University

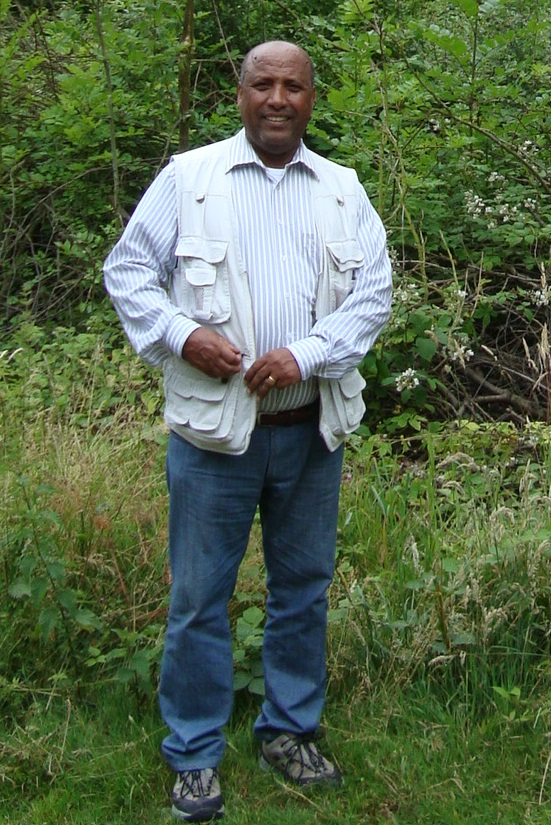

Founding president of Mekelle University
- In office 2000–2010
- Succeeded by: Joachim Herzig

Personal details
- Born: 1951 (age 74–75)
- Education: Ghent University
- Profession: Professor of Soil Science

Mitiku Haile (born 1951) is an Ethiopian researcher who was Professor of Soil Science at Mekelle University, undertaking research on sustainable land management, restoration of degraded lands and integrated soil fertility management.

== Career ==
- 1985: MSc at Ghent University, Belgium
- 1987: PhD at Ghent University, Belgium, under the supervision of Prof. Dr. ir. C. Sys
- 1987: Assistant professor of Soil Science at Alamaya, now Haramaya University
- 1990: staff member of the Arid Zone Agricultural College (established at the University of Asmara, and later on Agarfa in southern Ethiopia)
- 1993: dean of the Arid Zone Agricultural College in Mekelle that started with 42 students in 3 degree programmes. Later on, with the establishment of Mekelle University College, he became its dean also.

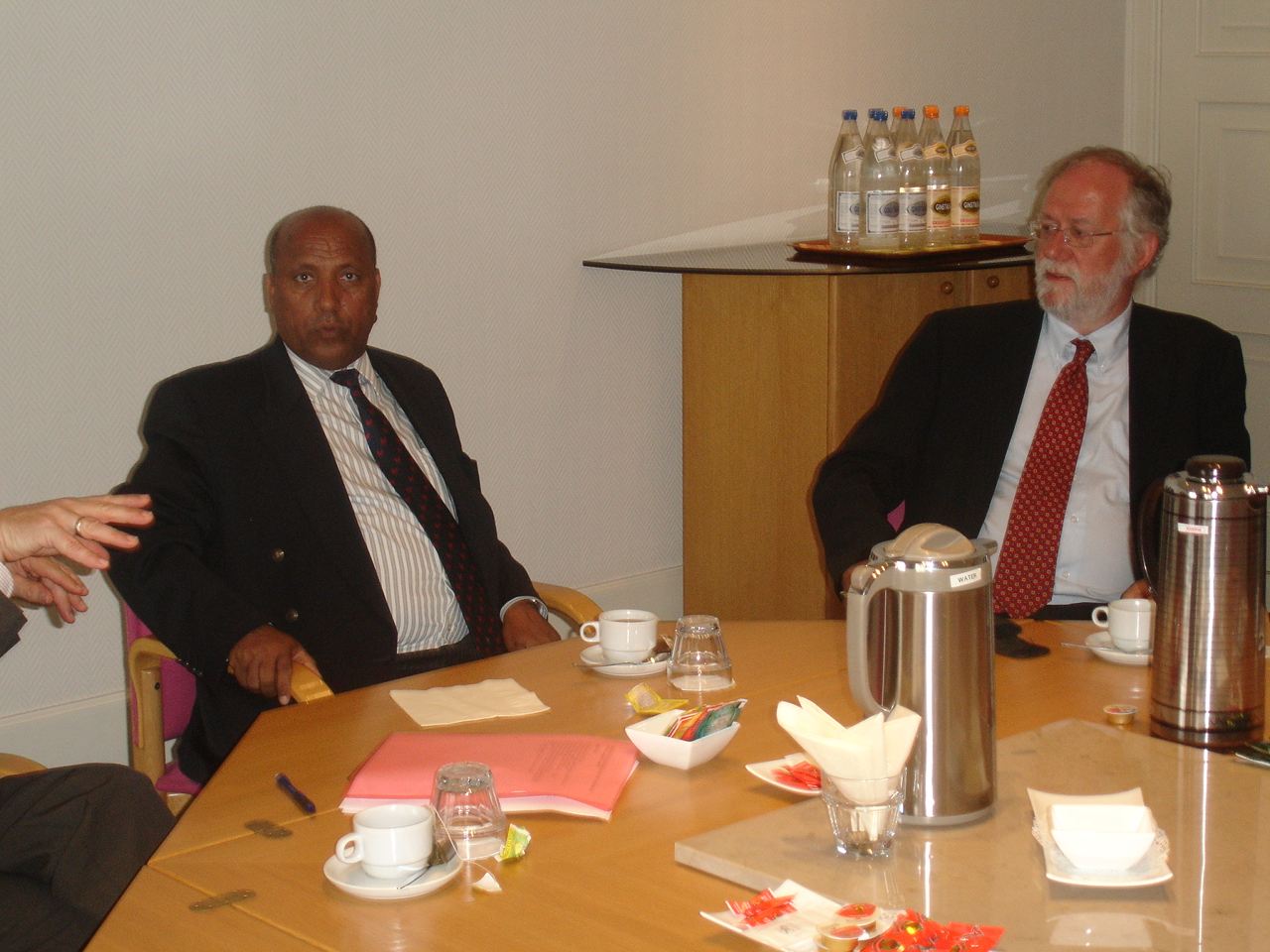
Mitiku Haile (left) with Paul Van Cauwenberge, rector of Ghent University in 2009

- 2000: president of Mekelle University that was established by the Government of Ethiopia (Council of Ministers, Regulations No. 61/1999 of Article 3) as an autonomous higher education institution
- 2011: Minister Plenipotentiary and Deputy Permanent Representative to UNESCO, Ethiopian Embassy in Paris
- 2015: Reinstated as Full Professor at the Department of Land Resources Management and Environmental Protection of Mekelle University

== Trivia ==
The Mitiku Hall at Mekelle University is named after him.
