= Giacomo Naretti =

Italian architect (1831–1899)

- Born: Giacomo Naretti; 29 August 1831; Parella, Piedmont-Sardinia
- Died: 8 May 1899 (aged 67); Asmara, Italian Eritrea

Giacomo Naretti (29 August 1831 – 8 May 1899) was an Italian artisan and trained carpenter. He migrated to Ethiopia, where he worked at the court of Emperor Yohannes IV.

He was part of the team of artisans who designed the palace of Emperor Yohannes IV, which is still preserved in Mekelle.

== Personal life ==
He was born in a family of peasants in Parella. Naretti was an employee in the Suez Canal construction. He was one of the diverse team of builders, artisans, and carpenters assembled by Emperor Yohannes for the construction. He married Theresa Zander. She was educated by the Swedish missionaries. At the beginning of 1888 Naretti settled first in Massawa, and then in Asmara where he died on 8 May 1899.

== His work ==
Naretti was described as an architect. In a journal article published by Nobuhiro Shimizu and Alula Tesfay Asfha, it was revealed that "the contribution of Naretti was also evident in more detailed elements of the palace such as the use of elaborate materials, decorative wooden works, stone arches, plaster, and its symmetrical appearance. These design achievements were most likely realized through Naretti's observation of the local building techniques and the natural environment, and his training of the local craftsmen during his stay in Ethiopia from 1871."

In the 1880s, Giacomo Naretti built the palace of Emperor Yohannes IV (1872-1889) and was completed in 1886. The Emperor moved to his residence after living at Debre Tabor. The palace was a two-storey annex with the throne room upstairs. It also had a large banquet hall. However, it was reported by Harrison Smith in 1886 that the Emperor did not like it. In the 1990s, the palace became a regional museum. Naretti also designed the Church of Enda Kidane Mihret.
