= Fetien Abay Abera =

Ethiopian professor

President of Mekelle University
- In office 2020–2021
- Preceded by: Kindeya Gebrehiwot
- Succeeded by: Fana Hagos Birhane

Personal details
- Born: Wukro
- Children: Three children
- Education: Norwegian University of Life Sciences
- Profession: Professor of Plant Science

Fetien Abay Abera is professor of crop science at Mekelle University (Ethiopia), undertaking research on participatory plant breeding, particularly barley. She released five varieties of barley that have been widely adopted by farmers across the Tigray region of Ethiopia and beyond. She is also a former President of Mekelle University.

== Career ==
- 1985 Diploma in Plant Science from Awassa College of Agriculture
- 1986-1989: worked in rural areas of Oromia and Amhara Regions
- 1991: BSc at Haramaya University, Ethiopia
- 1991-1993: researcher at Ethiopian Institute of Agricultural Research (EIAR)
- 1993: she joins Mekelle University
- 1995: MSc Rural Resource Management at University of Wales (Bangor)
- 2007: PhD at Norwegian University of Life Sciences, Norway
- 2016: Tenured professor at Mekelle University
- 2020: Appointed as President of Mekelle University by Ethiopia's Ministry of Science and Education

== Participatory barley breeding ==
Starting from 1997, Fetien discovered the dynamics of farmers' innovativeness in land management, through her lead in the Indigenous Soil and Water Conservation (ISWC) research programme. Fetien Abay has done pioneering work in participatory barley breeding in Ethiopia. She released five varieties of barley that were adopted by farmers in the Tigray region of Ethiopia. The crosses were carried out together with input from 250 experienced farmer breeders in different agro-ecologies. The barley crosses were developed from Himblil and Sa'isa, the major local cultivars in Tigray. Three of the varieties, formally released by Mekelle University are drought resistant, early maturing and highly nutritious barley varieties: felamit, hiriti, and fetina, with the latter one named after Fetien.

== Gender role model in Ethiopian academics and gender advocacy ==
Fetien Abay was the first female lecturer at Mekelle University, Ethiopia's first female professor of Plant Breeding and Seed and the third woman professor of the country. Whereas, since the 1990s, the number of public higher education institutions in Ethiopia has increased from 8 to 36, there was also an increased share of women in academia, yet this share reached only 12.6% by 2017. In 2014, 5% of the deans and only 3% of the department heads in Ethiopian universities were women. While at the age of twelve, Fetien Abay was proposed for an arranged marriage that later was rejected by her mother, she had become, by 2020, one of the four women who have ever been university president in Ethiopia.

Professor Fetien is outspoken on issues of gender equality in science and was director of the Institute of Environment, Gender, and Development Studies (IEGDS) at Mekelle University. She shared her experiences with hundreds of high school students, and actively empowered women, who have been given sponsorship, mentorship and advice. She contributed to facilitating grants and employment of outstanding women university graduates.

== Functions at Mekelle University ==
- Associate editor for the Journal of Dryland Agriculture
- Coordinator of the Graduate Programme in Dryland Crop Science
- Core team member of the Agro-Ecology in Practice Curriculum
- Member of the Agricultural College Council
- Curriculum development for Plant Breeding and Food Science

== Community service ==
- Member of the National Technical Advisory Council in the Ministry of Science and Technology, Ethiopian Crop Sciences Association
- Member of national PROLINOVA (Promoting Local Innovations)-network
- Co-founder of Tigray Women Agriculture Professional Association (TWAPA)
- Chair of the Araya Women and Children Charitable Organization, AWUCCO
- Chair of the Managing Regional Board of the Red Cross Tigray

== Recognitions and awards ==
- Farmers in Eastern Hararghe named a water point after her
- Communities in Tigray involved in barley improvement work gave her a traditionally valuable prize for the impact of this work on their lives
- 2009: in the African Women Professionals in Science Competition, she was recognized among the top five African women scientists for her work in plant breeding
- 2010: AWARD Fellow (African Women in Agricultural Research and Development)
- 2010: Ethiopian President's Award for her outstanding contributions to linking science and farmers and to furthering women's development
- 2014: East African Regional Laureate of African Union Kwame Nkrumah Award for Scientific Excellence
- 2015: winner of Ethiopian Women of Excellence
- 2017: Impact Research and Science in Africa (IMPRESSA) Award of the Regional Universities Forum for Capacity Building in Agriculture (RUFORUM)
