= 2021 Mekelle airstrikes =

2021 air strikes of Mekelle, Tigray, Ethiopia

- Part of the October 2021 Tigray offensive of the Tigray War
- Type: Airstrike
- Location: Mekelle, Tigray Region, Ethiopia; 13.494°N 39.466°E
- Date: 18–22 October 2021
- Executed by: Ethiopian Air Force
- Casualties: 4 killed 9 injured
- Location of Mekelle within Ethiopia

On 18 October 2021, the Ethiopian Air Force conducted two airstrikes on the city of Mekelle in the Tigray Region of Ethiopia during the Tigray War. 3 children were killed in the strikes.

On 20 October, there were new air strikes targeting inhabited areas of Tigray's capital city. A large enterprise, Mesfin Industrial Engineering, was also targeted.

Airstrikes continued on 21 and 22 October; the latter was nearby Mekelle University main campus, and Mekelle Airport and coincided with the landing time of a UN humanitarian flight. As a consequence, the UN cancelled further humanitarian flights to Mekelle.

== Attack ==
The first airstrike struck near a cement factory on the outskirts of Mekelle killing 3 children according to a local hospital. The second strike hit the city center near the Planet Hotel damaging the hotel and nearby buildings including Mesfin Industrial Engineering, killing one engineer. Nine people were injured. Bombs are launched from high altitudes, by fear of the TDF aerial defence and often miss their targets. In case of the humanitarian flight, the aim of organising a bombing raid at that very moment, might have been to induce the aerial defence into error and possibly shoot down the incoming civil aircraft. Fortunately, Mekelle Airport control tower could inform the pilots timely so that the flight returned to Addis Ababa without damage.

== Aftermath ==
The airstrikes were first denied, then later admitted by the Ethiopian government. The Ethiopian Press Agency said the airstrikes hit media and communications equipment used by Tigrayan forces. Tigrayan spokesman Getachew Reda said the airstrikes were targeting civilians noting that Monday, the day of the attack, is market day in Mekelle and the second airstrike hit a nearby market. Billene Seyoum, spokeswoman for Prime Minister Abiy Ahmed, said. “Civilians and civilian areas were not part of the target.”
