= Tigray Martyrs Memorial Monument =

Memorial monument located in Mekelle, Tigray Region, Ethiopia

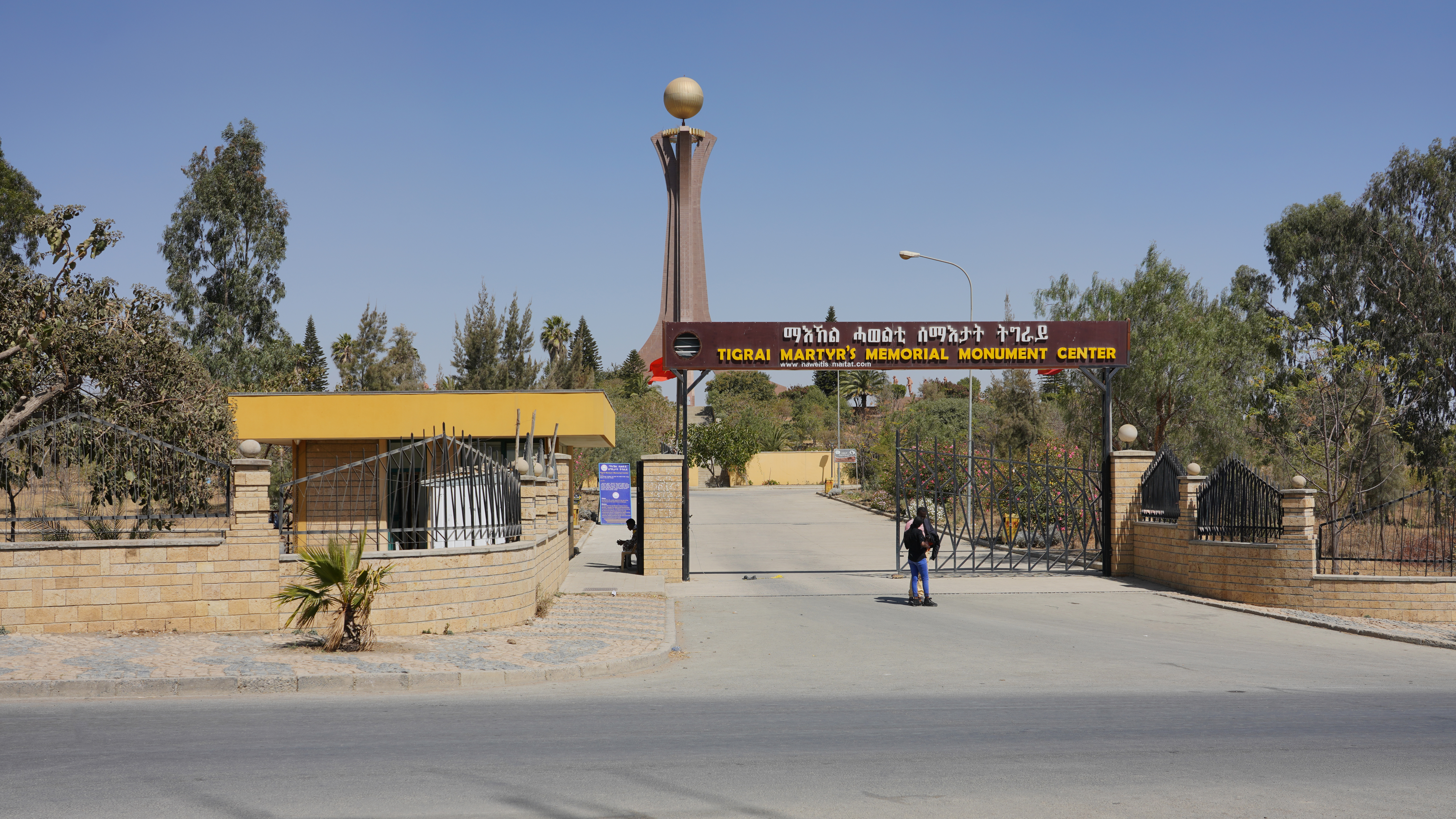
- Interactive map of Tigray Martyrs Memorial Monument
- Location: Mekelle, Tigray Region, Ethiopia
- Coordinates: 13.49°N 39.45°E
- Type: Memorial
- Height: 51m
- Beginning date: 1992
- Dedicated to: TPLF struggle against the Derg regime

The Tigray Martyrs Memorial Monument is a 51-meter tall memorial monument located in Mekelle, Tigray Region, Ethiopia. It was constructed after the Ethiopian Civil War in 1992 to commemorate the Tigray People's Liberation Front (TPLF) armed struggle against the Marxist-Leninist Derg regime.

== History ==
The Tigray Martyrs Memorial Monument was constructed in 1992 to commemorate the victims of the Ethiopian Civil War, particularly emphasizes the Tigray People's Liberation Front (TPLF) armed struggle against the Derg regime. The monument is 51 meters tall. In 2008, a museum dedicated to such homage was established and governed by the Board of Trustees and approved by the Council of the State of Tigray under Proclamation No. 160/2001.

During the Tigray War, the monument said to be targeted by the Ethiopian army during their occupation in Mekelle in 2021.
