= Mekelle University =

Public research university in Mekelle, Tigray Region, Ethiopia

- መቐለ ዩኒቨርስቲ
- Type: Public university
- Established: 1991
- President: Dr. Fana Hagos Berhane
- Academic staff: 2,103
- Students: 31,733 (2018)
- Undergraduates: 90+
- Postgraduates: 70+
- Location: Mekelle, Tigray Region, Ethiopia; 13°28′48″N 39°29′06″E
- Language: English
- Website: www.mu.edu.et
- Location within Ethiopia

Mekelle University (Tigrinya: መቐለ ዩኒቨርሲቲ) is a higher education and training public institution located in Mekelle, Tigray Region, Ethiopia, 783 kilometers north of Ethiopia's capital, Addis Ababa. Mekelle University is one of the largest public universities in Ethiopia. It has seven colleges, eleven institutes, and more than 90 undergraduate and 70 postgraduate programs. The student intake capacity of Mekelle University has reached 31,000 or 10% of Mekelle's population.

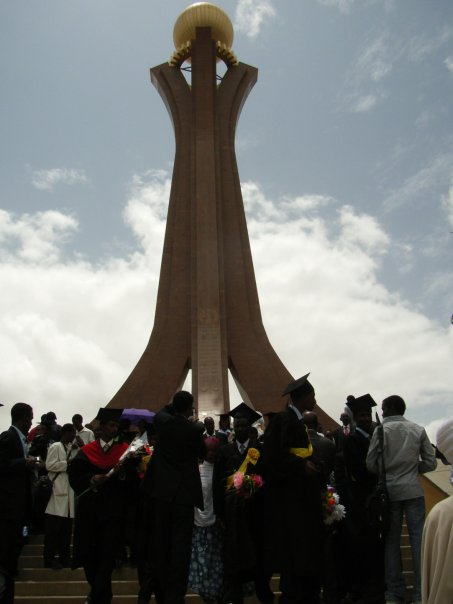
Graduate students of Mekelle University standing in front of Tigray Martyrs Memorial Monument in July 2009

== History ==
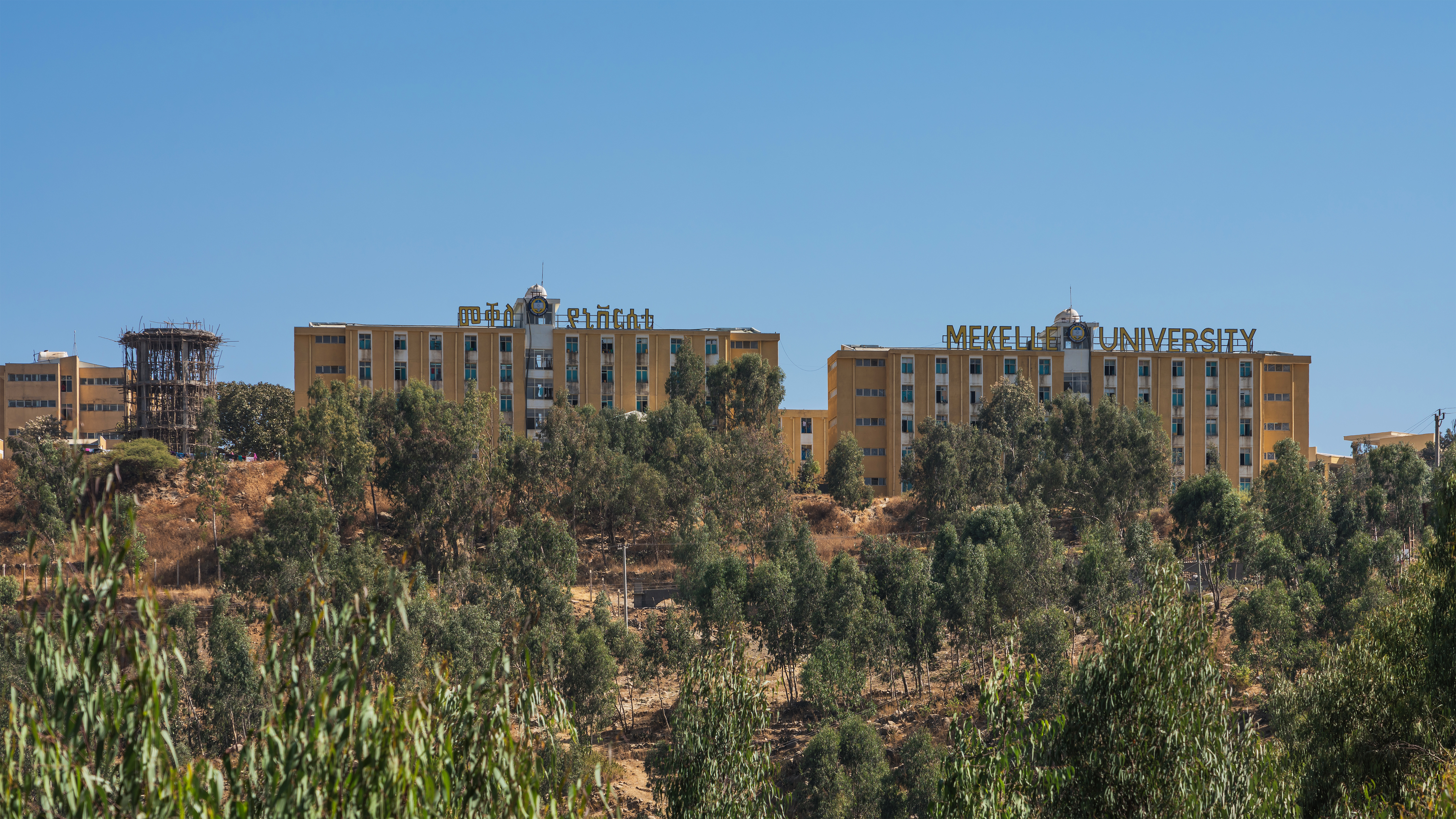
View of the campus

The Arid Zone Agricultural College was established at the University of Asmara but was then moved to Agarfa in southern Ethiopia in 1990. In 1993, the Arid Zone Agricultural College was moved to Mekelle and started with 42 students in 3 degree programs. After two years, the Faculty of Science and Technology was established at the same campus and, together, these two faculties were then combined into Mekelle University College. Also, the Faculty of Law started its operation by accepting diploma students through a continuing education program.

In May 2000, the Government of Ethiopia (Council of Ministers, Regulations No. 61/1999 of Article 3) formalized Mekelle University as an autonomous higher education institution. Mitiku Haile became the first president.

The university has been closed in 2021 and 2022 due to the Tigray war.

== Academics ==
=== Colleges ===
- College of Dryland Agriculture and Natural Resources Management
- College of Natural and Computational Sciences
- College of Law and Governance
- College of Social Sciences and Languages
- College of Business and Economics
- College of Health Sciences and Ayder Referral Hospital
- College of Veterinary Science

=== Institutes ===
- Ethiopian Institute of Technology - Mekelle (EiT-M)
- Institute of Mind-set Education
- Institute of Paleo-Environment and Heritage Conservation
- Institute of Geo-Information and Earth Observation
- Institute of Environment, Gender, and Development Studies
- Institute of Water and Environment
- Institute of Climate and Society
- Institute of Pedagogical Sciences
- Institute of Energy (IoE)
- Mekelle Institute of Technology (MIT-MU)
- Sports Science Academy and Mekelle Stadium (under construction)
- Ethiopian mechanical engineering society (under construction)
- Institute of Mountain Research and Development (under construction)

== Development of the main campus ==
A village existed at the escarpment's edge overlooking Mekelle. On a nearby hill, the Iyesus church was established. The villagers fetched their water from the May Anishti spring underneath. In 1895, a fort was established on the small hill overlooking the campus, and the place served as a military stronghold, that was conquered by the Italian army in 1935. In 1938, there was a shop-restaurant, a post, a telephone and telegraph office, an Italian military post and a military cemetery. In 1938, the village of Inda Iyesus counted approximately 350 inhabitants (including 45 Italians). After the Italian defeat in 1941, the Ethiopian army took over the place, which expanded it into a large military camp. After the defeat of the Derg army in 1989, the place was used for a few years by the TPLF army after which it was transferred to the Ministry of Education for the establishment of the "Arid Zone College" that would gradually grow into Mekelle University. Popular names of the campus are taken from this history: Arid Campus and Inda Iyesus Campus.

== Reputation and rankings ==
Mekelle University was ranked 3rd among the Ethiopian universities and 1588th in the world by Center for World University Rankings for the 2019-2020 period.

Year	National rank	World rank	Research performance rank	Overall score	Reference
2019-2020	3	1588	1531	67.4	
2020-2021	3	1863	1782	66.3	
2021-2022	3	1870	11792	66.2	
2022-2023	3	1783	1716	66.5	

== Parks ==
Mekelle University's main campus hosts several parks:

- Momona Park, called after a large momona tree (Faidherbia albida) under which the first lectures were organized in the academic year 1993–1994
- Belgium Park, in reference to the longstanding cooperation with the Belgian academic institutions (starting 1994)
- The large May Anishti forest on the slope between campus and the city.

== Presidents ==
SN	Year	Name	Profession	Note
1st	2000-2010	Mitiku Haile (PhD)	Professor of Soil Science and Sustainable Land Management	
2nd	2010-2013	Joachim Herzig (PhD)		
3rd	2013-2020	Kindeya Gebrehiwot (PhD)	Professor of Forestry	
4th	2020-2021	Fetien Abay (PhD)	Professor of crop sciences	
5th	2021-to date	Fana Hagos Birhane (PhD)		

== Notable people ==
- Samuel Urkato, Minister of Science and Higher Education.

== See also ==
- List of universities and colleges in Ethiopia
- Education in Ethiopia
