= Mekelle =

Capital of Tigray Region, Ethiopia

Mekelle መቐለ (Tigrinya)
- Regional capital and special zone
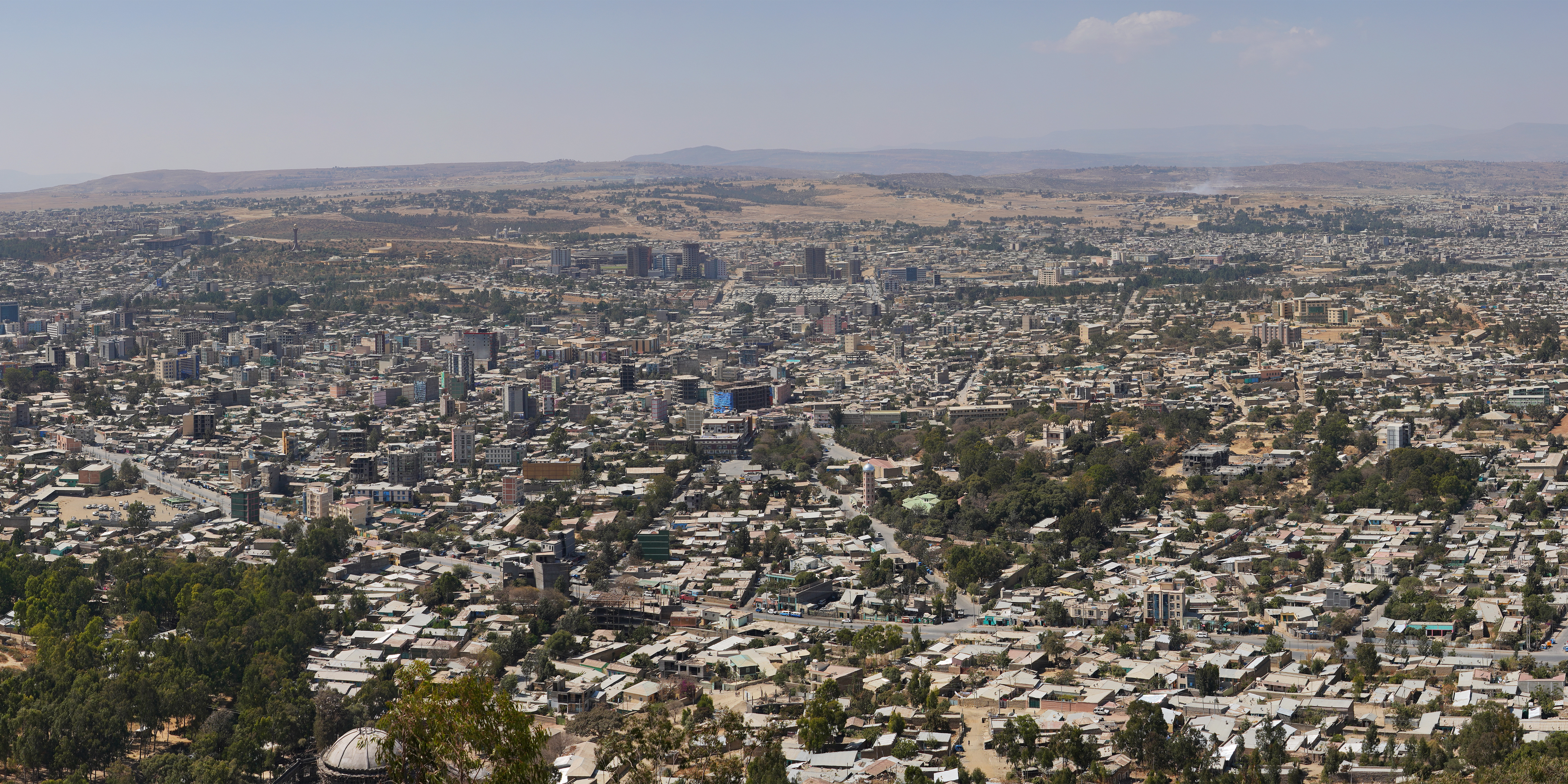
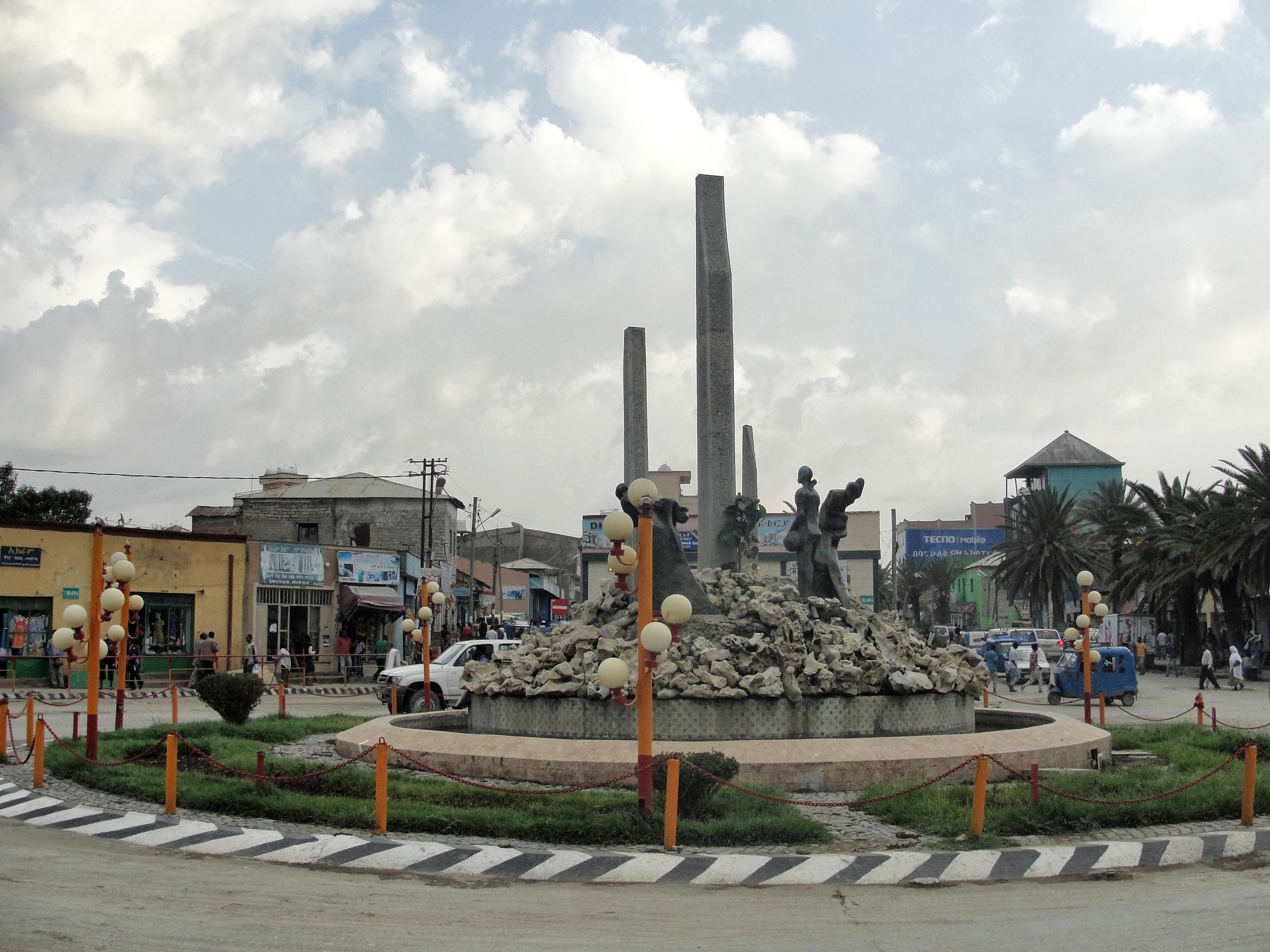
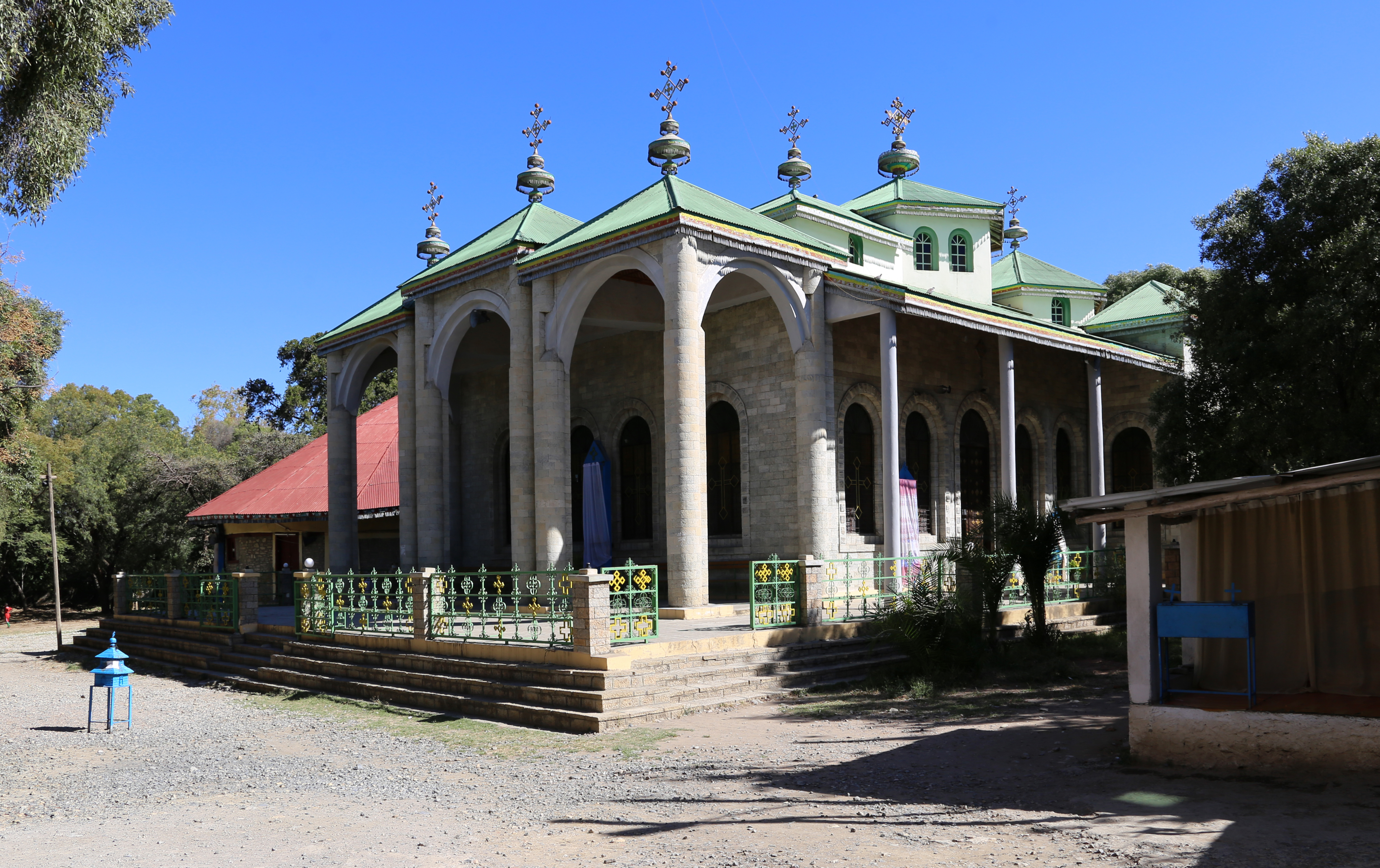
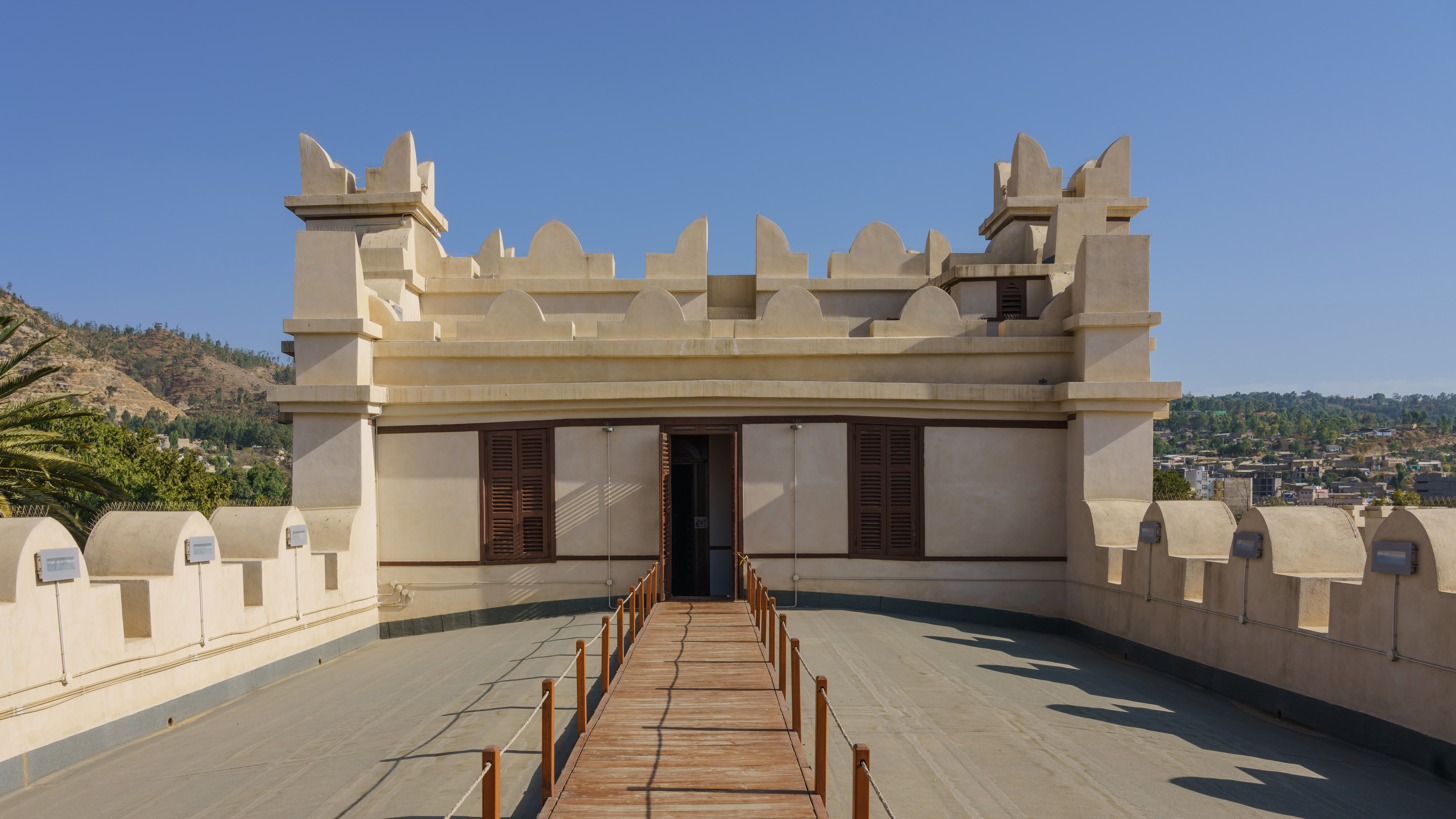
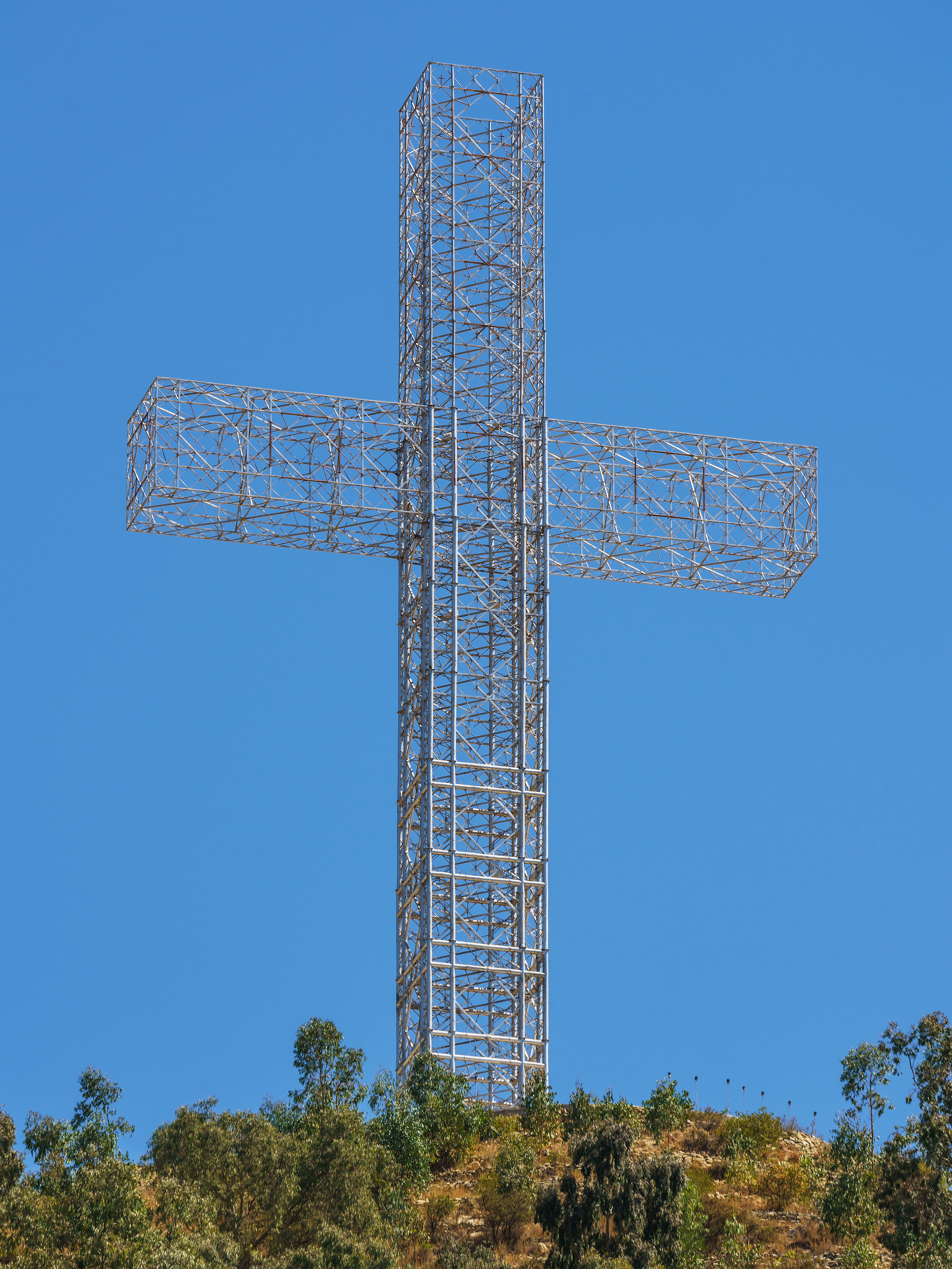
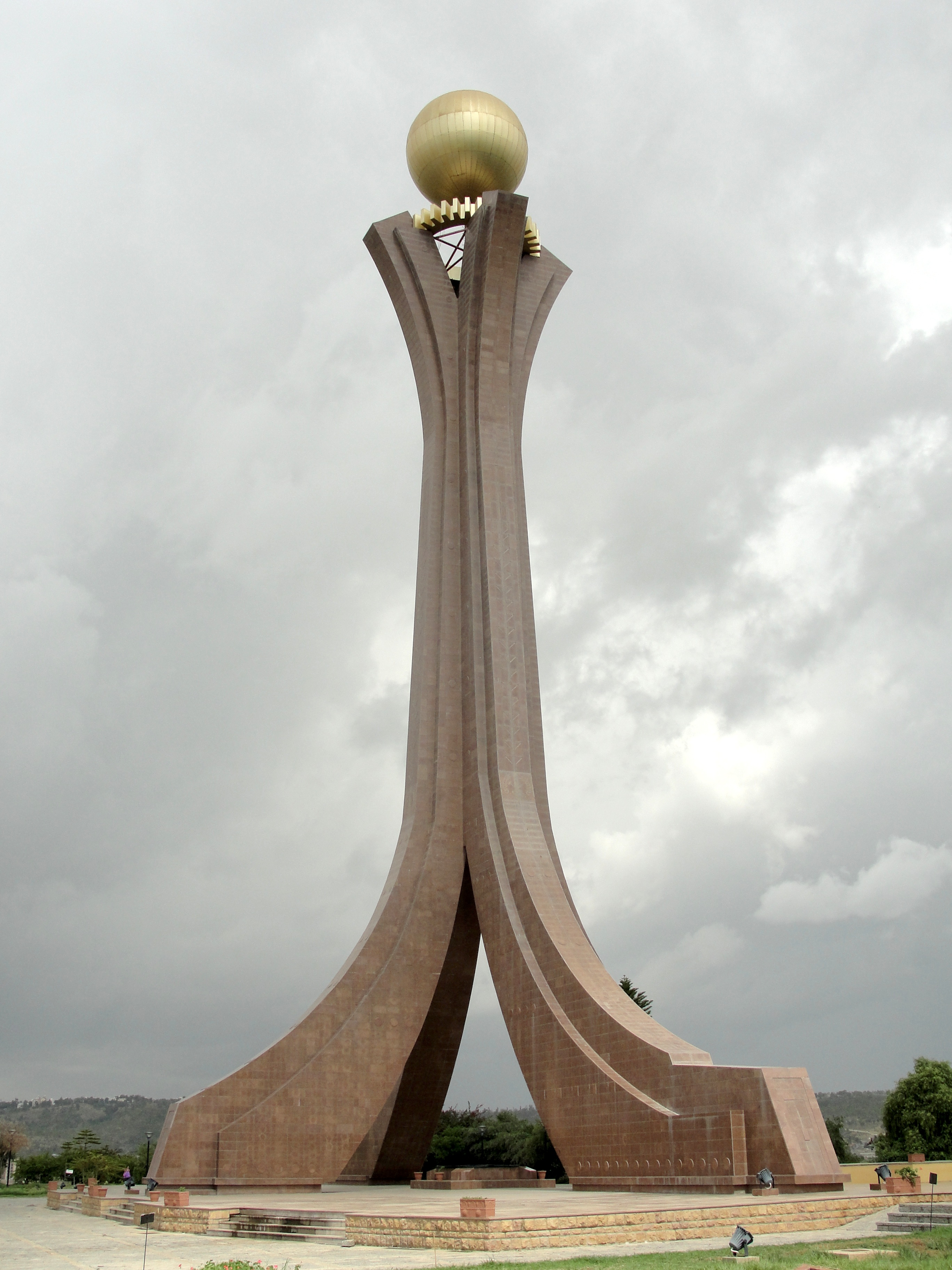
- From top, left to right: Central Mekelle; Hawzen Square; Tekele Haymanot Church; Emperor Yohannes IV Palace Museum; Meskel cross at Chom’a hill; Tigray Martyrs Memorial Monument
- Nickname: The Northern Star(ሰሜናዊት ኮኾብ)
- Mekelle special zone

- Location within Ethiopia Location within the Horn of Africa Location within Africa
- Coordinates: 13°29′49″N 39°28′37″E
- Country: Ethiopia
- Region: Tigray
- Zone: Mekelle Special Zone

Government
  - Mayor: (Redae Berhe as of 13 March 2025)

Area
  - Total: 93 km^{2} (36 sq mi)
- Elevation: 2,254 m (7,395 ft)

Population (2023)
  - Total: 525,475
  - Estimate (2023): 545,635
  - Density: 5,700/km^{2} (15,000/sq mi)
- Time zone: UTC+3 (EAT)
- Area code: (+251) 14
- Climate: Cold semi-arid

Mekelle (Tigrinya: መቐለ, romanized: Mek'ele) is a special zone and capital of the Tigray Region of Ethiopia. Mekelle was formerly the capital of Enderta awraja in Tigray. It is located around 780 kilometres (480 mi) north of the Ethiopian capital Addis Ababa, with an elevation of 2,254 metres (7,395 ft) above sea level. Administratively, Mekelle is considered a Special Zone, which is divided into seven sub-cities. It is the economic, cultural, and political hub of northern Ethiopia.

Mekelle has grown rapidly since 1991 with a population of 61,000 in 1984, 97,000 inhabitants in 1994 (96.5% being Tigrinya-speakers), and 170,000 in 2006 (i.e. 4% of the population of Tigray). Mekelle is the second-largest city in Ethiopia after Addis Ababa, with a population of around 545,000. It is four times larger than Adigrat, the second-largest regional center. The majority of the population of Mekelle depends on government employment, commerce, and small-scale enterprises. In 2007, Mekelle had new engineering, cement, and textile factories, producing for the local and foreign markets. Mekelle University developed out of the pre-1991 Arid Agricultural College, and about a dozen other governmental and private colleges were created.

== History ==
=== Origins ===
Mekelle is believed to have evolved from a 13th-century hamlet called Enda Meseqel (later Enda Medhane Alem), becoming a town by the early 19th century, when ras Wolde Selassie of Enderta made Antalo his seat of power, and the region of Mekelle (40 kilometres (25 mi) to the north) his recreational center. In the tax records of atse Tewodros II, Mekelle appears as a tributary district within Enderta with a negarit of its own.

=== 19th century ===
The credit for Mekelle's growth into a regional capital goes to atse Yohannes IV who made Mekelle political capital of his expanding state. He must have chosen the place for its strategic proximity both to rich agricultural areas (of Raya Azebo) and to the Afar salt country. Mekelle's position on the route to Shewa, the power base of Yohannes's main rival Menelik could have been another factor. Three institutions still important for modern Mekelle were founded by Yohannes. The grand palace built in 1882–84 by the Italian architect Giacomo Naretti forms the historic center of Mekelle. The large market Edaga Senuy ("Monday Market"). The church, at Debre Gennet Medhane Alem, built after the return from Raya Azebo campaign in 1871.

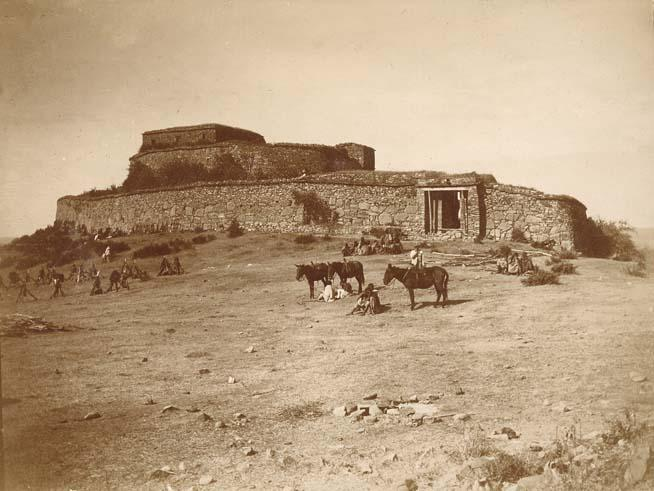
Fort of Enda Eyesus (c. 1890)

In the 1880s, Mekelle became Ethiopia's capital city. Among the factors that further accelerated Mekele's growth and urbanization were the establishment of residential quarters by the "nobility" and court servants, the prominence of the amole salt market and the subsequent establishment of local and foreign trading and occupational communities, and Mekelle's strategic position as a transit center for commodities of the long-distance trade routes of northeastern Ethiopia, attached to the Red Sea ports, and to northern and central Ethiopia. By establishing a market in Mekelle, Yohannes could draw on the northern trade routes as well as the salt caravan routes to the town, capitalizing on his political leverage.

The succession of atse Menelik II of Shewa signaled a trading reorientation from northern to southern Ethiopia (centered in Shewa). The new capital Addis Ababa quickly outstripped Mekelle, which, however, retained its political importance as the district and regional administration center of Enderta and Tigray respectively through the 20th century, and its economic role in the Ethiopian salt trade.

During the Italian War of 1895–96, Mekelle became an important site in the conflict. After the fall of Adwa in spring 1895, ras Mengasha Yohannes retreated from his father's capital Mekelle following the advice of atse Menelik II. Mekelle was occupied by the Italians without a shot and integrated into the Colonia Eritrea; from here the Italians extended their occupation south, up to Ambalage. The Italian army established their fort near the Enda Eyesus church above Mekelle in October 1895. After the re-occupation of Ambalage in late 1895, the fort was besieged by Ethiopian troops, who cut the Italians' water supply. When the Italians surrendered in January 1896, Menelik allowed them to retreat to their stronghold Adigrat, probably hoping to prevent an escalation of the conflict, and he appointed his own governor over Enderta at Mekelle, dejazmach Tedla Abaguben, in order to check the rebellious Tigrayan princes.

=== 20th century ===
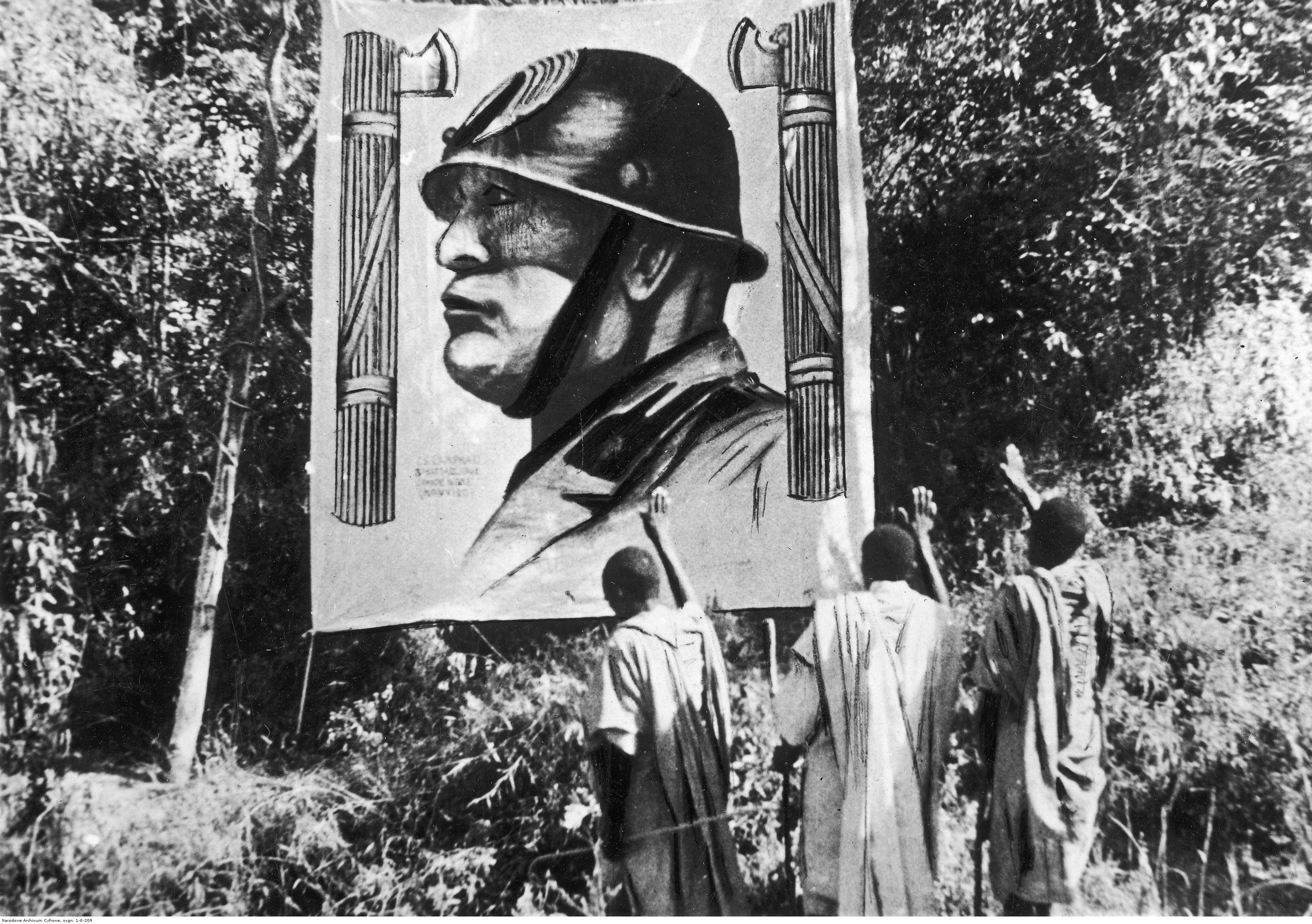
Depiction of Benito Mussolini in Mekelle in November 1935

Three historical epochs sustained Mekelle's urbanization in the 20th century. The first was the advent of dejazmach Abreha Araya Demtsu, governor of Eastern Tigray with Mekelle as his capital. Abreha imitated his cousin Yohannes by establishing his own splendid palace (now the Hotel called Abreha Castle) on a hill facing the grand palace, a new Saturday Market (Edaga Senbet), and a new church, Selassie, all of which were situated to the south of Mekelle proper. Likewise, he attracted various occupational groups including Muslim traders, women service vendors, and army retainers. Consequently, in the 1920s and early 1930s, Mekelle witnessed a remarkable growth in trade. Dejazmach Haile Selassie Gugsa renovated the Palace in the center to use it as his seat.

The second phase occurred during the Italian occupation (1935–41). The Italians, who occupied the town in November 1935, contributed considerably to its modernization. They built a military airport and a fort at Enda Eyesus (now the main compound of Mekelle University); reorganized roads, telephone lines, offices and residences; and installed modern water pipelines, electricity, clinics, postal services, cinema hall and resort/sport centers. They also expanded Edaga Senbet by introducing corrugated iron shops. This also attracted foreign entrepreneurs (Greeks, Arabs and Armenians). Mekelle, then divided into two zones, Italian and Native, and grew about twice its former size. In 1938, there were shops, two Italian-style restaurants and Hotel Amba Aradam with four rooms. There were post, telephone, and telegraph offices, and a hospital. An important market was held on Mondays.

Starting from May 1943, Mekelle was in the hands of the leaders of the Woyane rebellion against the then weak restored Haile Selassie government. British air bombardment of the town of September–October caused heavy damage. In October Mekelle was recaptured by the Ethiopian government forces.

The third phase in Mekelle's urban development took place mainly during 1942–74. Modern urban sectors were diversified, and new administrative offices were established. The Mekelle municipality (founded 1942), telecommunications and post office, Commercial Bank and the atse Yohannes Elementary (in 1952) and Secondary School (in 1960) were established. The master plan was issued in 1962. Small-scale enterprises such as oil refineries, soap mills, leather and caning bags, costumes and flour mills were established until 1974. Most of the industrial establishments, however, have declined, degraded or closed during the Ethiopian Civil War (1974-1991).

During the 1983–85 famine in Ethiopia, Mekelle was notorious for the seven "hunger camps" around the city. These housed 75,000 refugees with 20,000 more waiting to enter. During March 1985, 50 to 60 people died in these seven camps every day. In February 1986, the Tigray People's Liberation Front (TPLF) released 1,800 political prisoners from the Mekelle prison in a daring military action. The operation was named Agazi, after one of the founding fighters of the TPLF, who had been killed in the second year of the Ethiopian Civil War.

In a series of offensives launched on 25 February 1988, TPLF fighters bypassed Mekelle but took control of Maychew, Korem and other places along the Dessie-Mekelle road. By June 1988, TPLF controlled all of Tigray except the city of Mekelle and the territory a radius of 15 kilometres (9.3 mi) around the city. In response, the Derg had a number of villages around Mekelle burned on June 4 and 5, which included Addi Gera, Bahri, Goba Zena, Grarot, Issala, and Rabea. It was not until 25 February 1989 that Mekelle was also occupied by the TPLF, after the government position in Tigray had collapsed. Near the end of the civil war, Mekelle was bombed by the Ethiopian Air Force on 27 and 29 October 1989, resulting in the deaths of at least 31 people.

On 5 June 1998, the Eritrean Air Force bombed Ayder School in Mekelle during the Eritrean–Ethiopian War killing twelve. A monument pays respects to this tragedy.

=== 21st century ===
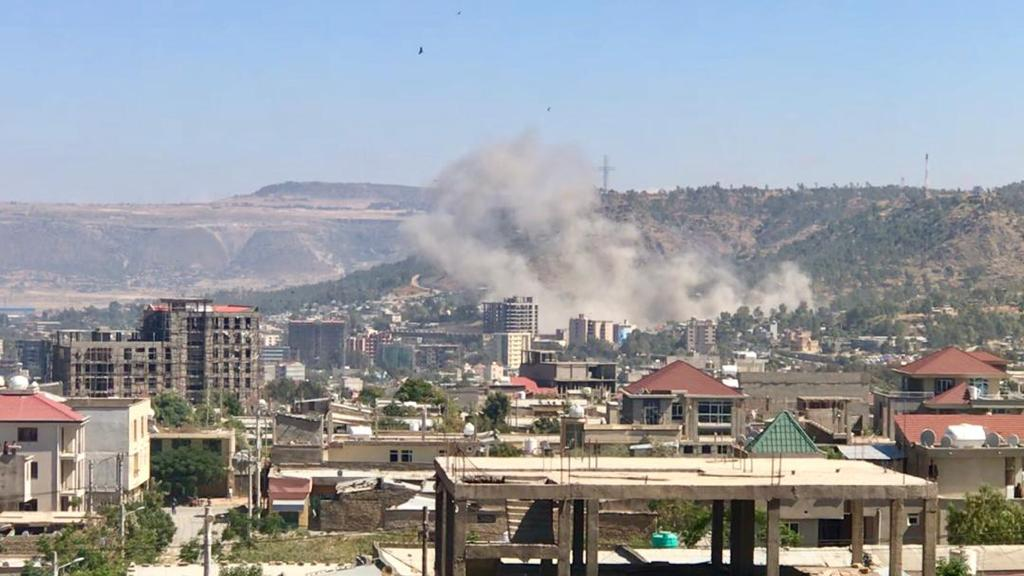
An Ethiopian Air Force airstrike launched at Mekelle during the Tigray War in November 2020

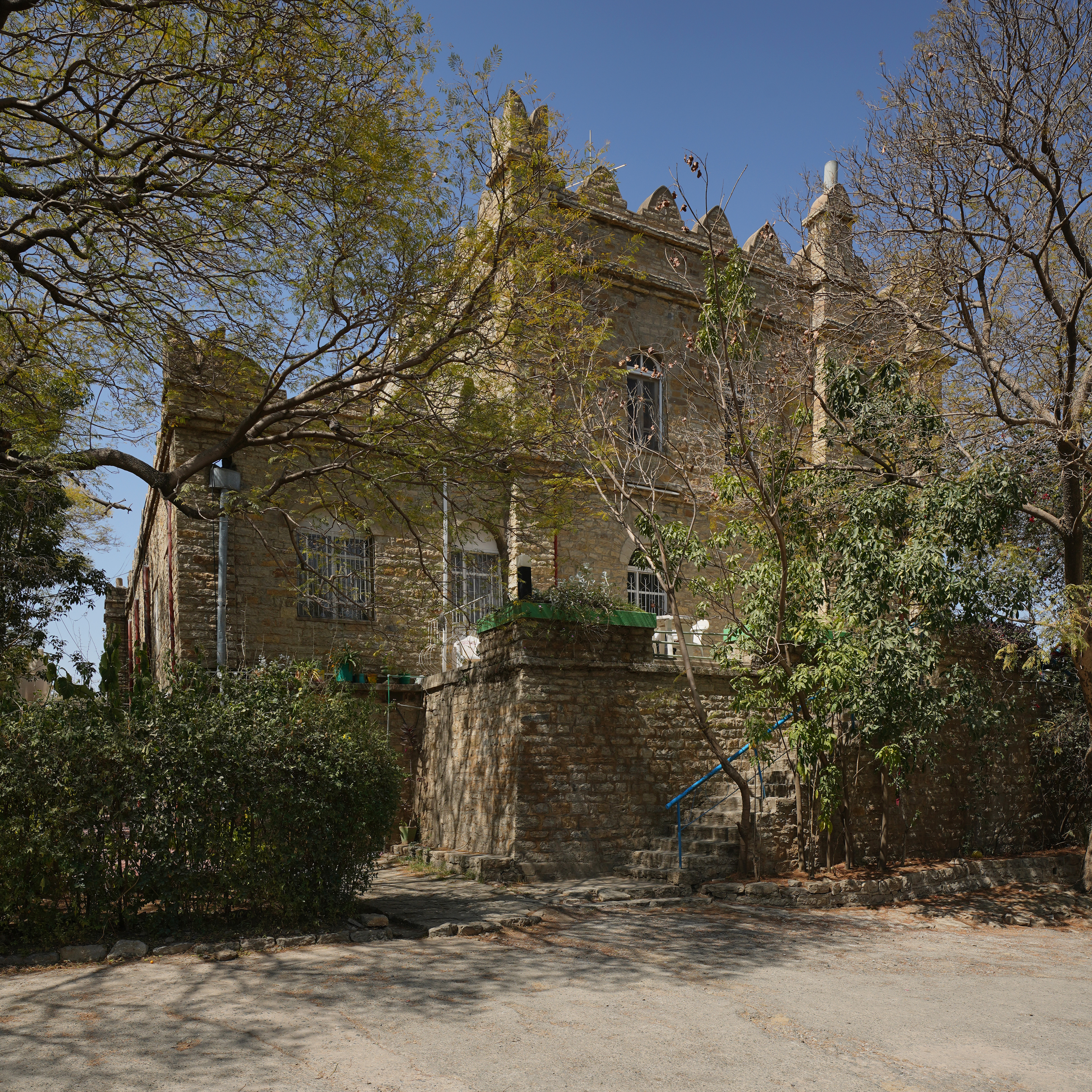
Abreha Castle, now Abreha Castle Hotel, in January 2018

On 29 December 2002, a riot broke out between Ethiopian Orthodox and Adventist worshippers, over an Adventist prayer service being conducted in a stadium. Some Ethiopian Orthodox believers, upset by the display of public Adventist preaching, reportedly sparked the clashes by first throwing stones at Adventists gathered in the stadium, then by looting Adventist offices in the city. Police intervened to break up the riots, which resulted in five dead and three seriously injured. The police reported that 10 people were detained, but independent sources reported that the number was much larger.

The United Nations Mission in Ethiopia and Eritrea (UNMEE) headquarters was established in Mekelle in 2000 following the end of the Eritrean–Ethiopian War and continued until 30 July 2008.

During the Tigray War, attacks were carried out on Mekelle by joint Ethiopian and Eritrean forces, including aerial bombardments. On 19 December 2020, an EEPA report stated that Eritrean soldiers were in Mekelle, according to a resident and two diplomats receiving information from the ground. They stated that some soldiers were wearing Eritrean uniforms, whilst others wore Ethiopian uniforms but "spoke Tigrinya with an Eritrean accent and drove trucks without license plates." On 19 December 2020, there were multiple reports that the Ethiopian National Defence Force (ENDF) were looting property from the Sur Company in Mekelle and transporting the loot to Addis Ababa. On the same day, police and TPLF absence led to lawlessness in Mekelle. Youth were especially targeted by ENDF soldiers. Civil servants in Mekelle were ordered back to work by the Transitional Government of Tigray; few reported to work. On 20 December 2020, witnesses from Mekelle stated that artillery shelling had taken place before 28 November. The shelling destroyed houses in residential areas and killed civilians. In one case, a whole family was killed, leaving only a little boy alive. A doctor said that he personally saw 22 bodies. It was hard to take proper care of those wounded by the artillery due to a critical shortage of medical supplies. Four planned Ethiopian Airlines flights from Addis Ababa to Mekelle were cancelled on 20 December. On 21 December 2020, Federal Police Crime Prevention Sector Head, Deputy Commissioner General Melaku Fanta, told local media in Mekelle that arrest warrants have been issued against anyone who collaborated with the TPLF. On 28 June 2021 Mekelle was recaptured by the Tigray Defense Forces.

In March 2025, The Guardian reported that a faction of the Tigray People's Liberation Front, led by Debretsion Gebremichael, took over several offices in Mekelle. In what it called a coup, it reported that armed men belonging to the faction patrolled the streets of the city at night, checking people's identification. The Guardian also said that there are some reports suggesting that Eritrean intelligence helped Debretsion's faction assume power. Meanwhile, it reported that Getachew Reda, the interim leader of Tigray, had fled to Addis Ababa. It is believed that, as of 3 October 2026, soldiers of the TPLF have left the city in wake of an Ethiopian offensive.

== Geography ==
Mekelle lies at an elevation of 2,254 metres (7,395 ft) above sea level (at the airport), close to the edge of the northern portion of the Ethiopian Rift Valley, on a Jurassic limestone plateau, in a semi-arid area with a mean annual rainfall of 714 millimetres (28.1 in). Except for a moderately dense eucalyptus cover on the hills in eastern edges of Mekelle and some exotic species of trees and shrubs lining the streets, the surrounding landscape is almost treeless.

== Cityscape ==
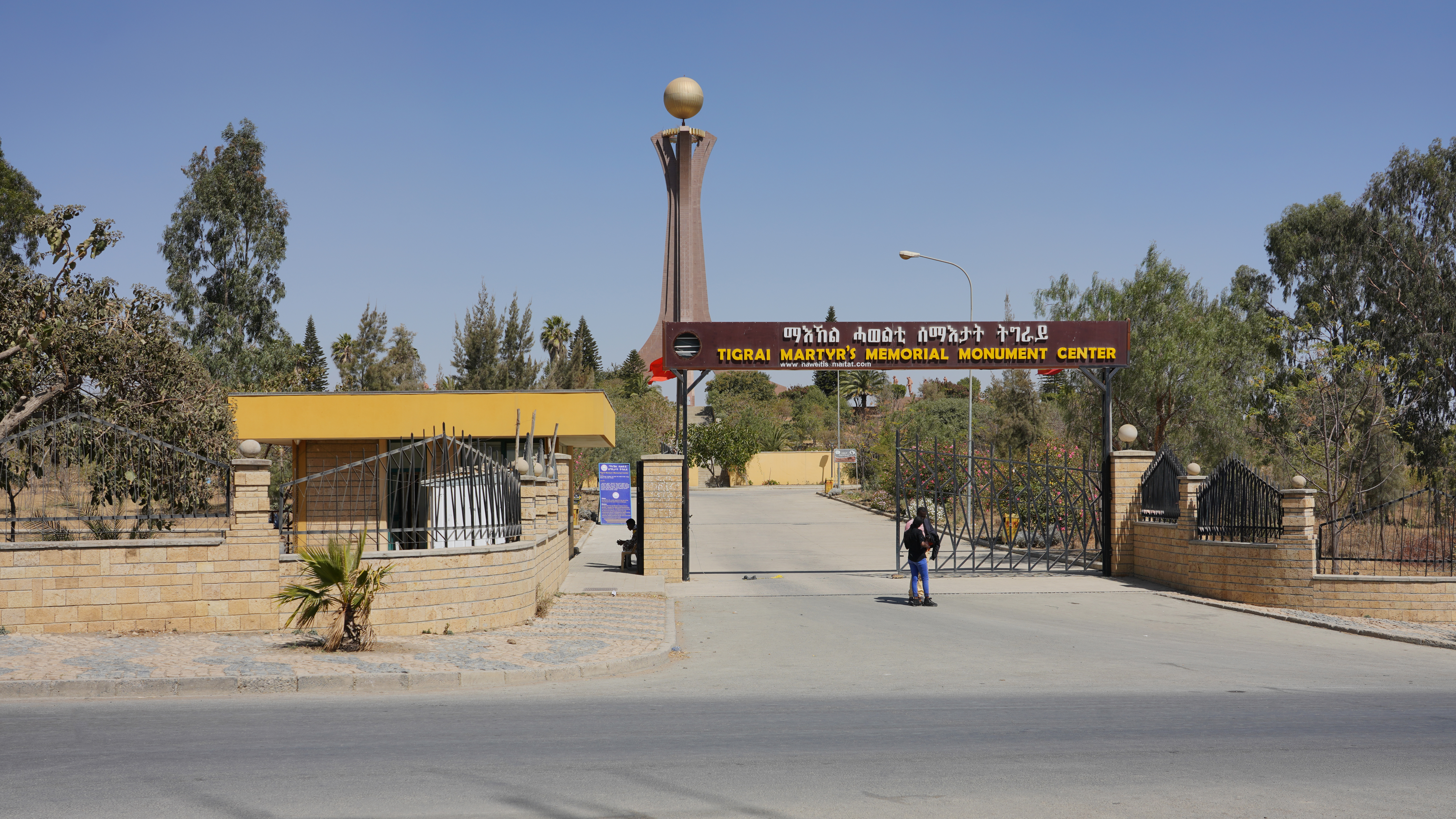
Tigray Martyrs Memorial Monument and the museum

The Tigray Martyrs Memorial Monument pays respects to the over 60,000 TPLF fighters who died and over 100,000 fighters who were injured in the overthrow of the Marxist Derg regime in 1991. The monument is 51 metres (167 ft) tall and is located in Adi-Haki sub-city. The monument has many sculptures depicting the struggle of the peasants and fighters against the Derg soldiers.

Emperor Yohannes IV in the 19th century became Negus and built a castle and Ethiopian Orthodox Tewahedo churches in the city. The castle was constructed by Ethiopian engineer Lij Ingidashet and Italian engineer Giacomo Naretti. The castle complex now serves as a museum where the Emperor's throne, royal bed, ceremonial dress, rifles, and many other valuable historical collections can be seen.

Other notable landmarks include the churches Enda Gabir, Enda Yesus Mekelle Bete Mengist, Mekelle Iyesus, Mekelle Maryam, Mekelle Selassie, Enda Mariam Bugsa and Mekelle Tekle Haymanot.

=== Sub-cities ===
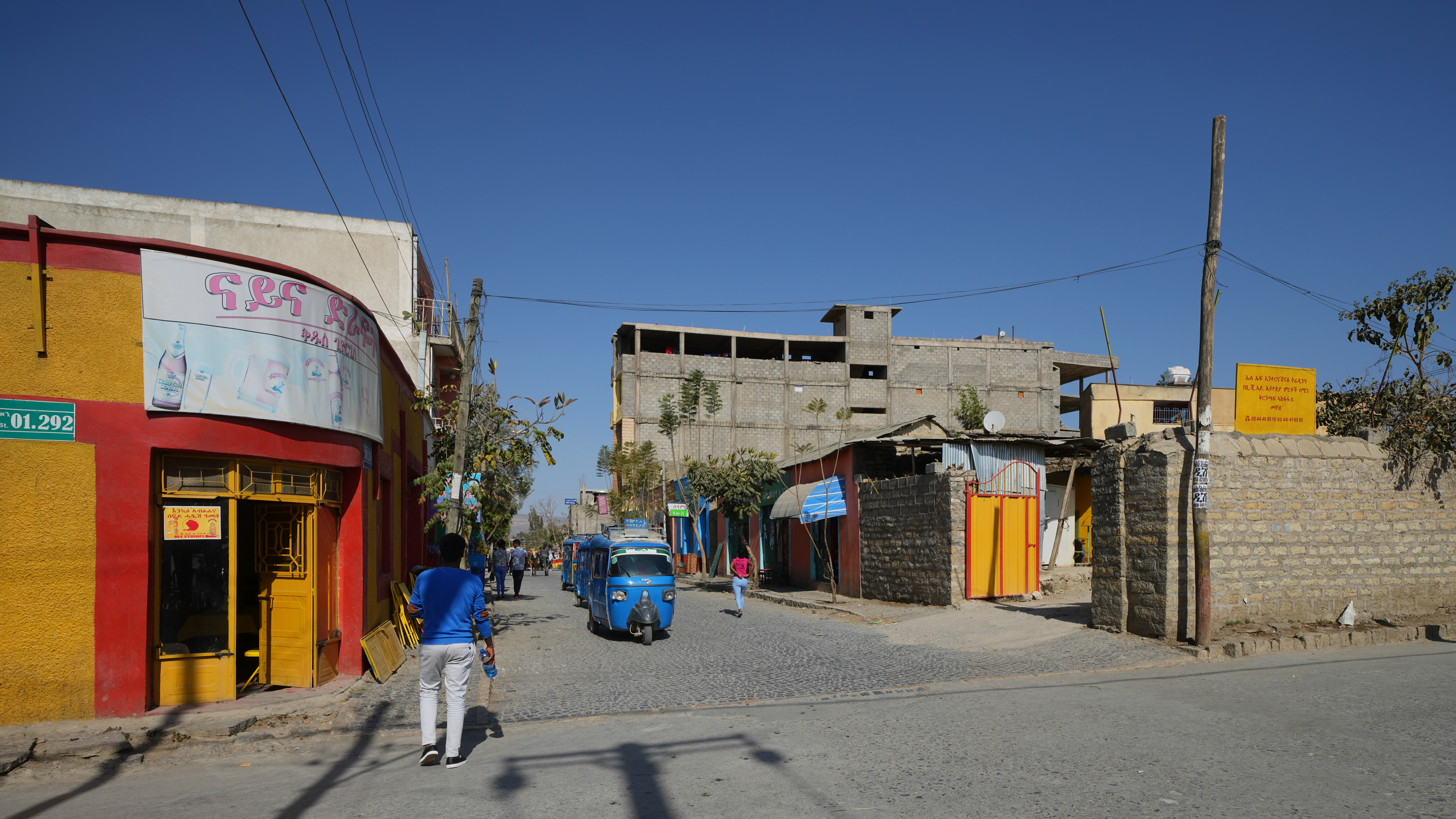
Intersection near a shop in southern Mekelle in 2018

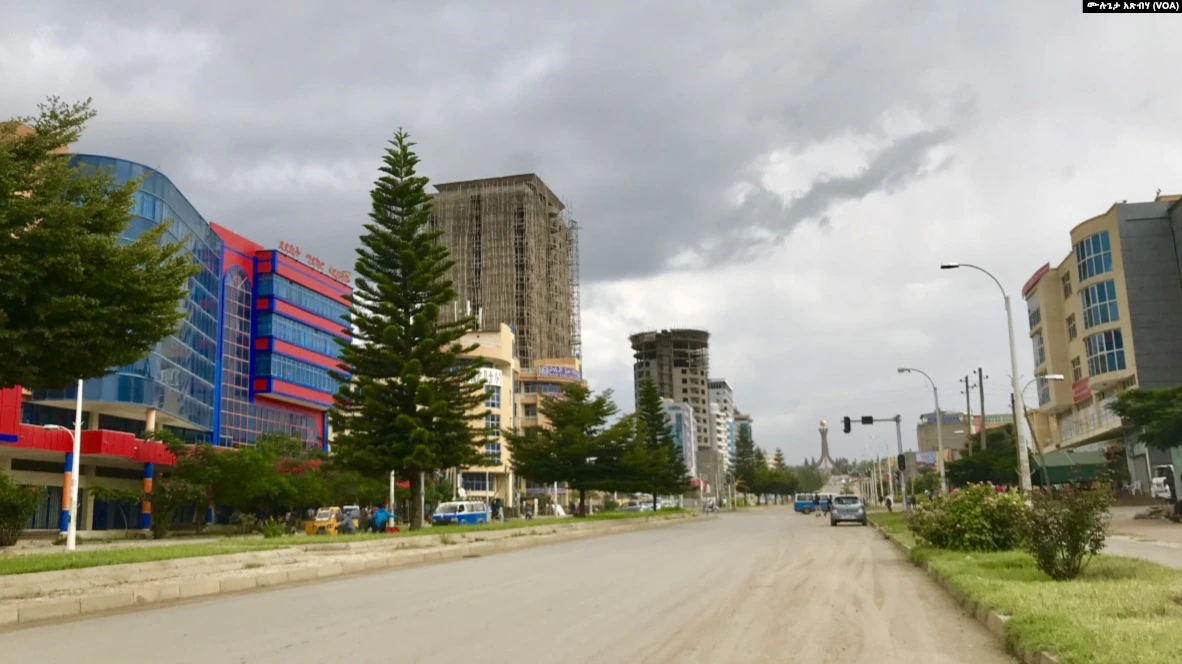
Dejen Street in Mekelle in 2021

Mekelle is divided into seven local administrations: Hawelti, Adi-Haki, Kedamay Weyane, Hadnet, Ayder, Semien and Quiha. Within each local administration there are kebeles or ketenas. The subcities of Mekelle comprise the area formerly incorporated as Mekelle City. While falling under the jurisdiction of Mekele Special Zone Government, each subcity is also a borough with its own administrator, like other cities of Ethiopia. These officials oversee socio-economic development and run health, education, and utilities.

The sub-cities differ from other cities in having a unique administrative relationship with the regional government. Certain municipal functions, such as waterworks, sewerage, and fire-fighting, are handled by the Mekelle Government. To pay for the added administrative costs, the prefecture collects municipal taxes, which would usually be levied by the city. The "three central sub-cities" of Mekelle – Kedamay Weyane, Ayder and Hawelti – are the business core of the city, with a daytime population more than seven times higher than their nighttime population. Semien is unique occupied by many major factories. It is often called the "economic center" of the Tigray.

Mekelle special zone has been represented in the House of Peoples' Representatives by Addis Alem Balema since 2005.

== Climate ==
The climate in this area is characterized by moderately warm temperatures year-round and distinct wet and dry seasons. The Köppen type for this climate is cool semi-arid climate (BSk); however it borders on both a subtropical highland climate (Cwb) and a hot semi-arid climate (BSh).

Climate data for Mekelle, elevation 2,070 m (6,790 ft)
Month	Jan	Feb	Mar	Apr	May	Jun	Jul	Aug	Sep	Oct	Nov	Dec	Year
Mean daily maximum °C (°F)	22.9 (73.2)	24.4 (75.9)	25.1 (77.2)	25.7 (78.3)	26.8 (80.2)	27.1 (80.8)	23.3 (73.9)	22.3 (72.1)	24.2 (75.6)	23.6 (74.5)	22.5 (72.5)	22.2 (72.0)	24.2 (75.5)
Mean daily minimum °C (°F)	8.9 (48.0)	9.8 (49.6)	11.3 (52.3)	12.8 (55.0)	13.4 (56.1)	13.2 (55.8)	12.7 (54.9)	12.7 (54.9)	11.4 (52.5)	10.7 (51.3)	9.7 (49.5)	8.9 (48.0)	11.3 (52.3)
Average precipitation mm (inches)	3.2 (0.13)	5.2 (0.20)	25.0 (0.98)	34.2 (1.35)	33.4 (1.31)	29.8 (1.17)	199.9 (7.87)	222.7 (8.77)	32.4 (1.28)	8.0 (0.31)	6.2 (0.24)	0.7 (0.03)	600.7 (23.64)
Average relative humidity (%)	54	52	51	49	44	46	73	77	59	50	53	55	55
Source 1: Ethiopian Meteorological Institute
Source 2: FAO (humidity)

== Demographics ==
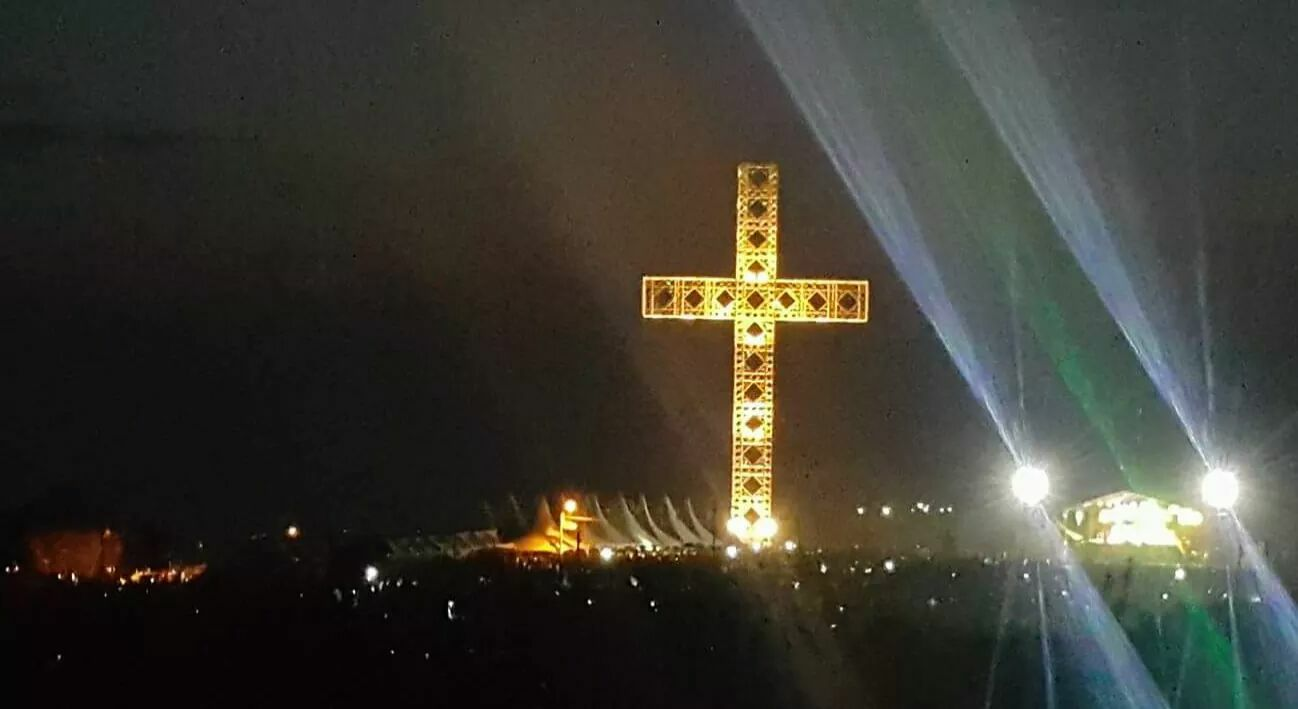
A holy cross for celebration of the Meskel holiday is located on the mountains in the east of the city.

Ethnic groups of Mekelle in 1994
1. Tigrayan (96.5%)
2. Amhara (1.59%)
3. Eritreans (0.99%)
4. Other (0.92%)

There were about 5,000 inhabitants in 1935; by 1938, the town counted approximately 12,000 inhabitants (including 100 Italians).

Based on the 2007 Census conducted by the Central Statistical Agency of Ethiopia (CSA), this town has a total population of 215,914 people (104,925 men and 110,989 women). The two largest ethnic groups reported in Semien Mi'irabawi were the Tigray (96.2%), and Amhara (2.26%); all other ethnic groups made up 1.54% of the population. Tigrinya is spoken as a first language by 95.55%, and Amharic by 3.18%; the remaining 1.27% spoke all other primary languages reported. 92.68% of the population said they were Orthodox Christians, and 6.03% were Muslim.

The 1994 national census reported the population of Mekelle as 96,938 people (45,729 men and 51,209 women). The two largest ethnic groups reported were the Tigrayan (96.5%), the Amhara (1.59%), foreigners from Eritrea (0.99%); all other ethnic groups made up 0.98% of the population. Tigrinya was spoken as a first language by 96.26%, and 2.98% spoke Amharic; the remaining 0.76% spoke all other primary languages reported. 91.31% of the population practiced Ethiopian Orthodox Christianity, and 7.66% were Muslim. Concerning education, 51.75% of the population were considered literate, which is more than the Zone average of 15.71%; 91.11% of children aged 7–12 were in primary school; 17.73% of the children aged 13–14 were in junior secondary school; and 52.13% of the inhabitants aged 15–18 were in senior secondary school. Concerning sanitary conditions, about 88% of the urban houses had access to safe drinking water at the time of the census, and about 51% had toilet facilities.

== Economy ==
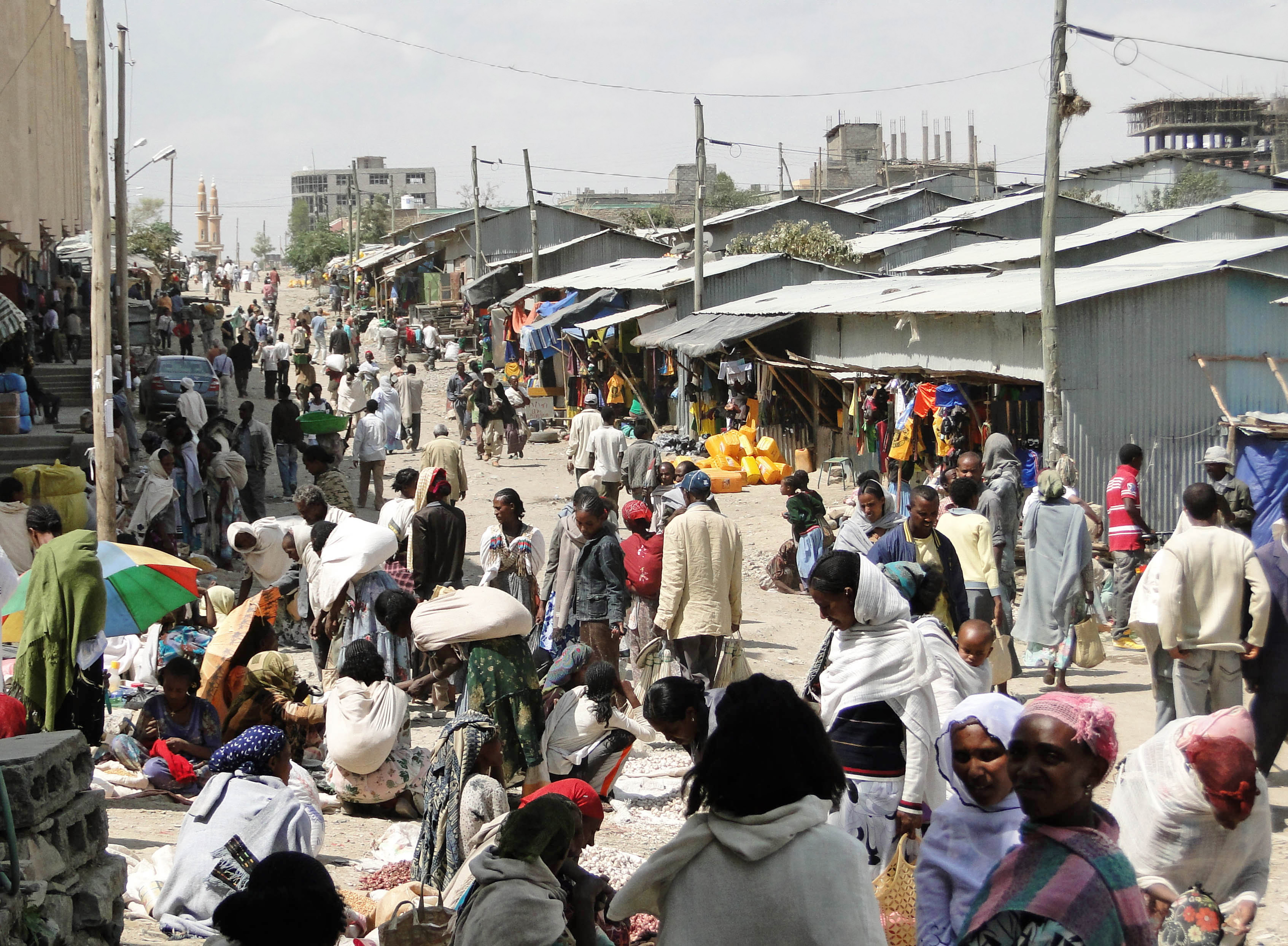
Marketplace in Mekelle.

Mekelle is one of Ethiopia's principal economic and educational centers.

=== Manufacturing ===
Local industry includes Mesfin Industrial Engineering, a steel fabrication and manufacturing factory, which also has car assembly line and Messebo Cement Factory, northern Ethiopia's principal cement production facility. Both companies are owned and managed by the Endowment Fund for the Rehabilitation of Tigray (EFFORT).

The $100 million Mekelle Industrial park hosts many foreign textiles companies and employs approximately 20,000 people.

=== Services ===
There has been a boom in hotel services for tourism and conferences due to predominant place Mekelle holds in northern Ethiopia. The development of healthcare services has greatly aided in improving the quality of life of Mekelle's inhabitants. A $3.5 million modern referral public health laboratory was constructed by the US CDC to serve as a training site as well as providing quality assurance for Tigray's hospitals and medical laboratories.

=== Agriculture ===
Mekelle is surrounded by agrarian villages that sell their crops to the urban population in the markets. Traditionally there is a market on Saturday and Monday where a wide variety of produce and livestock is available for sale, in addition to salt from Afar.

=== Livestock ===
The Abergelle Slaughterhouse, funded by the Dejenna Endowment, began operations in late 2008.

== Governance and politics ==
The city council is Mekelle's legislative body and the city is administered by a mayor and seven local administrators. One of Mekelle's mayors was Daniel Assega (or Daniel Assefa). During the Tigray War, Ataklti Haile Selassie was mayor of Mekelle under the Transitional Government of Tigray from mid-December 2020 through to his resignation on 30 March 2021.

== Infrastructure ==
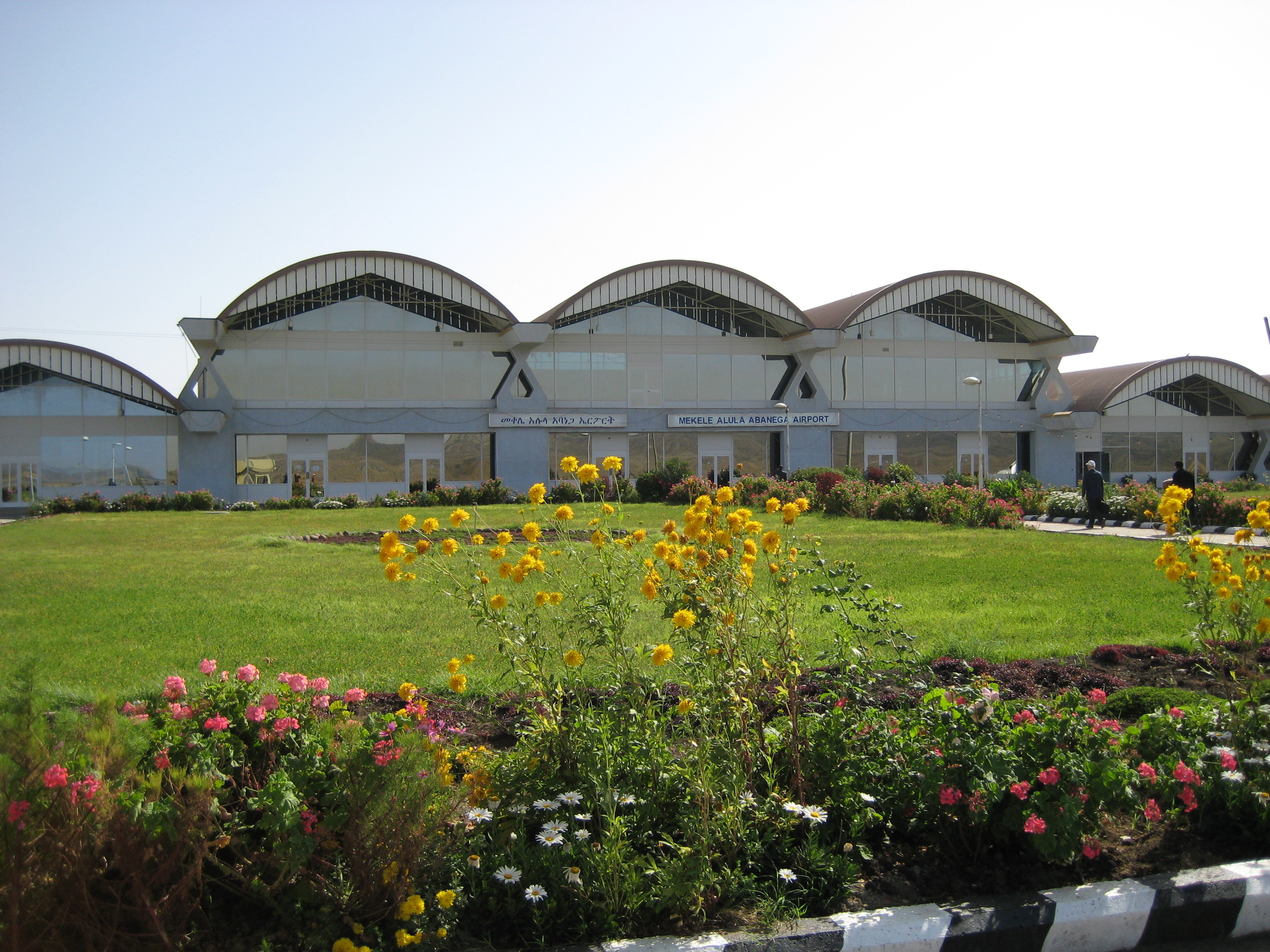
Alula Aba Nega Airport

=== Transport ===
Mekelle is linked by all-weather roads to Addis Ababa and Aksum, and has an airport, Ras Alula Aba Nega International Airport (ICAO code HAMK, IATA MQX). Intercity bus service is provided by the Selam Bus Line Share Company, and its city bus service is provided by Amora buses.

Mekelle is the terminal station of the electric Weldiya–Mekelle Railway (under construction), connecting Mekelle with Addis Ababa and Djibouti. The line does not touch Mekelle itself, but ends Qwiha, one of the sub-cities in the special region of Mekelle.

=== Education ===
Publicly run kindergartens, elementary schools (years 1 through 6), and junior high schools (7 through 9) are operated by local wards or municipal offices. Public high schools in Mekelle are run by the Tigray Education Bureau. Mekelle also has many private schools from kindergarten through high school.

Mekelle has several universities, junior colleges, and vocational schools. Many of Ethiopia's most prestigious universities are in Mekelle, including Mekelle University and Mekelle Institute of Technology. Nejashi Ethio-Turkish International Schools and Closys College are private schools in the city.

== Sports ==
Mekelle 70 Enderta F.C. and Dedebit F.C. are the local football teams from the city; both have been competing in the Ethiopian Premier League. A local market has been held every Monday since at least 1890.

== International relations ==
Mekelle is a member of the Millennium Cities Initiative.

=== Twin towns – sister cities ===
Mekelle is twinned with:

- Ramla, Israel
- Witten, Germany

== See also ==
- Kingdom of Aksum
- Mekelle offensive (2020)
- Tigray People's Liberation Front
- Tigray War
