= List of universities and colleges in Tigray =

This is a list of universities and colleges in Tigray, Ethiopia. It includes both public, governmental, and private institutions.

Institution	Location	Year established	Ownership	Notes
Abi Adi College of Teachers Education	Abi Adi		Governmental	
Adigrat University	Adigrat	2011	Governmental	Has 14,300 students in 37 departments and six colleges
Admas University College	Mekelle		Private	
Adwa College of Teacher's Education	Adwa		Governmental	
Adwa Pan-African University	Adwa	2017	Governmental and private	This institution is under construction.
Alage College	Alage	2002	Private	
Alpha University College	Mekelle		Private	Head office in Addis Ababa
Axum Nursing School	Axum		Governmental	
Axum University	Axum, Shire	2007	Governmental	Hosts one institute and six colleges, in three campuses (Mayako Referral Campus, Sefehoo Main Campus, and Shire Campus). Motto: Excellence through perseverance.
Defence University College	Mekelle		Governmental	Head office in Bishoftu
Hashenge College	Mekelle, Shire			
Hope University College	Mekelle	2003	Private	Head office in Addis Ababa
Mekelle Institute of Technology	Mekelle	2002	Private	In 2013 merged with Mekelle University
Dr.Tewelde Legesse Nursing School	Mekelle		Governmental	
Maichew Technical College (MTC)	Maichew	1990	Governmental	
Medco Bio-Medical College	Mekelle		Private	Head office in Addis Ababa
Mekelle	2009 E.c	private		
Mekelle University	Mekelle, Quiha	1993	Governmental	Hosts over 31,000 students in eleven institutes and seven colleges, in seven campuses (Endayesus main campus, Adihaqi campus, Ayder campus, Aynalem campus, Kalamino campus, and additional two campuses under construction namely Quiha and Baloni). Motto: We Really care.
Microlink Information Technology College			Private	
New Millennium College	Mekelle		Private	
Nile College	Mekelle		Private	
Pentech College of Science and Technology	Mekelle		Private	Hosts more than 2,000 students in three institutes and three campuses where the college has started also giving online colleges via http://www.pentechcollege.com
Raya University	Maychew	2015	Governmental	Hosts over 1,500 students in six colleges. The university aspires to be one of the top ten ranked Public Universities in Ethiopia by 2030.
Sheba University College	Mekelle Adigrat Axum Shire		Private	
Closys College	Mekelle	2014	Private	
