= Siqurto foot tunnel =

Foot tunnel that crosses beneath the Imba Tsiyon Ridge

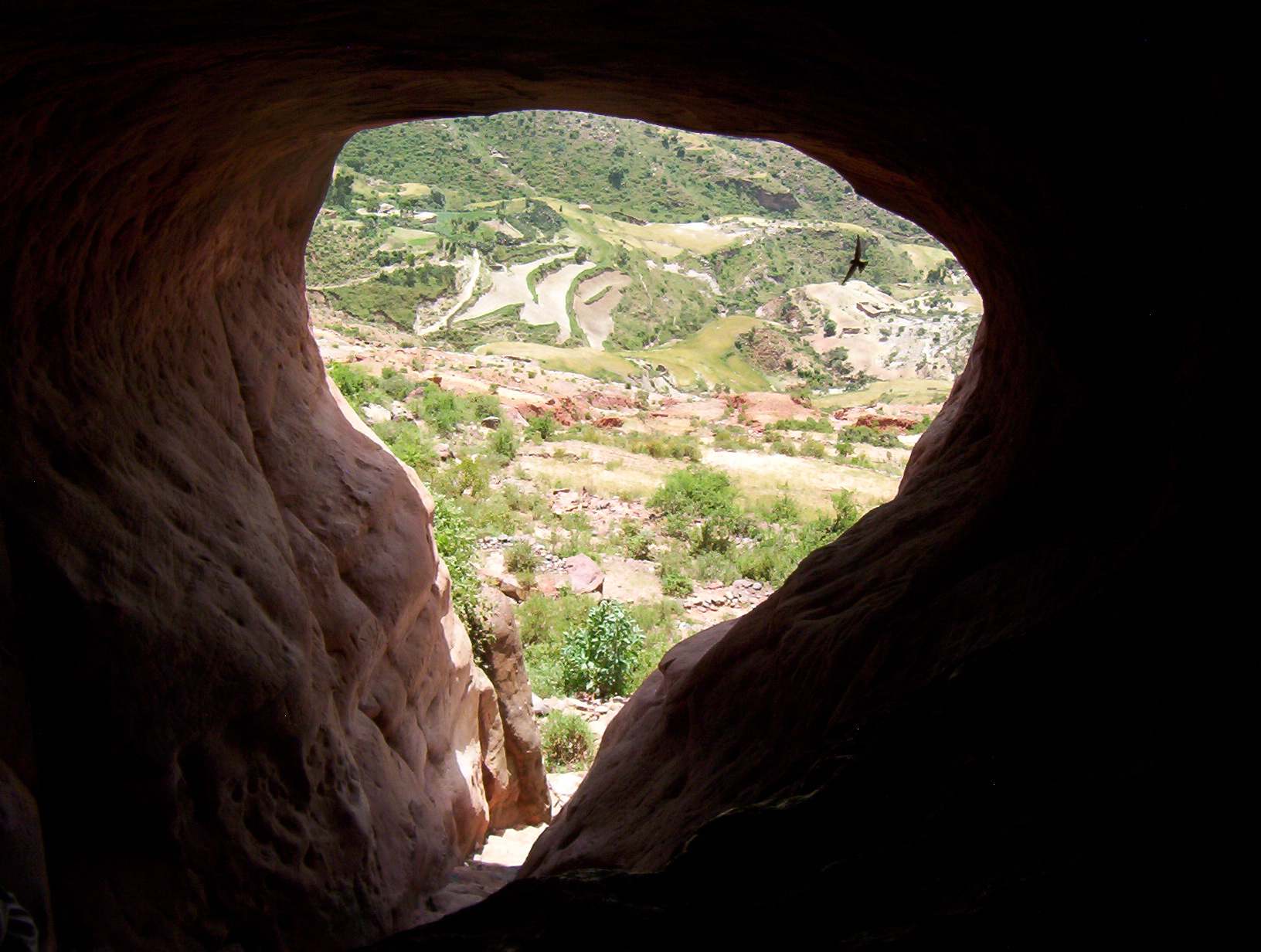
- Interactive map of Siqurto foot tunnel

Overview
- Other name: ስቑርቶ
- Location: Tigray, Ethiopia
- Coordinates: 14.114837°N 39.430093°E
- Crosses: Gobo Dogu’at ridge
- Start: May Zerqu’it
- End: Ga’ibien

Operation
- Operator: Local community
- Traffic: Pedestrian

Technical
- Length: 60 m (200 ft)
- Tunnel clearance: 2.5 m (8 ft 2 in)
- Width: 3 m (9.8 ft)

The Siqurto foot tunnel crosses beneath the Imba Tsiyon ridge, which forms the water divide between the Giba and Weri'i basins. The ridge is part of the Mugulat Mountains, Tigray, Ethiopia,

== Design and construction ==
The tunnel was hewn in the Adigrat Sandstone rock in the same period when rock churches were built in Tigray. During the period of Italian occupation of Ethiopia, local people closed and hid the tunnel, forcing Italian troops and administrators to travel longer distances.

== Location ==
The tunnel links

- Nebelet and May Zerqu’it at the west

with

- Ga’ibien and Adigrat at the east.

The use of the tunnel allows decreasing the travel distance on foot between Nebelet and Adigrat by 8 kilometres.

== Usage ==
The tunnel is used daily by local farmers, with their donkeys, mules and oxen.

== Upgrade works ==
The bottom was strengthened with steps and pavement.
