= Raya University =

University in Maichew, Tigray Region, Ethiopia

- ራያ ዩኒቨርስቲ
- Type: National
- Established: 2015
- President: Professor Tadesse Dejene (PhD)
- Academic staff: 1500
- Students: 6,000+ (2017/18)
- Location: Maichew, Tigray Region, Ethiopia; 12.800903811907842°N 39.540830099987026°E
- Campus: 1
- Language: English
- Colours
- Location in Ethiopia

Raya University
- Established: February 2015
- Location: Maichew, Tigray, Ethiopia
- Website: www.rayu.edu.et

Raya University is located at Maichew, Tigray at a distance of 668 km (415 mi) north of Addis Ababa along Ethiopian Highway 2 or 130 km (81 mi) south of Mekelle city.

== History ==
Raya University was established by the Government of Ethiopia (Council of Ministers, Regulations No. 357/2016) as an autonomous higher education institution. The university has started its construction on June 7, 2016. Eighty-eight point five one percent(88.51%) of the construction was completed in May 2017. The first phase construction was completed on July 7, 2017.

All necessary preparations are underway to enroll 1500 students and 500 teachers in October 2017.

== Colleges ==
Raya University comprises six colleges, one school and offers various undergraduate and postgraduate programs.

- College of Natural and Computational Sciences (CNCS)
- College of Agriculture and Natural Resources (CANR)
- College of Business and Economics (CBE)
- Colleges Social Sciences and Humanities (CSSH)
- College of Engineering and Technology (ETC)
- College of Medicine and Health Science(CMHS)
- School of Law
