= Aksum University =

University in Axum, Tigray Region, Ethiopia

Coordinates: 14.106°N 38.707°E

- አክሱም ዩኒቨርሲቲ
- Motto: Excellence Through Perseverance
- Established: February 2007
- Founder: Ethiopian Government
- President: Gebreyesus Birhane (PhD)
- Location: Aksum, Ethiopia
- Website: www.aku.edu.et

Aksum University (AKU) is a teaching university in Aksum in Tigray Region, Ethiopia. It offers teaching programs and research projects which lead toward undergraduate and master's degrees. It was established in February 2007 with the objective of teaching about education, research and community service. During the Tigray War in late 2020 and early 2021, the university's facilities were "completely destroyed", according to Alula Habteab, head of the Bureau of Construction, Road and Transport in the Transitional Government of Tigray.

== International relations ==
- (Austria) - University of Graz, University of Vienna
- (United States) - Metropolitan State University of Denver, University of Nebraska–Lincoln

== See also ==
- List of universities and colleges in Ethiopia
- Education in Ethiopia
