= Ganta Afeshum =

District in Tigray Region, Ethiopia

Coordinates: 14°20′N 39°15′E

Ganta Afeshum ጋንታ ኣፈሹም
- Woreda
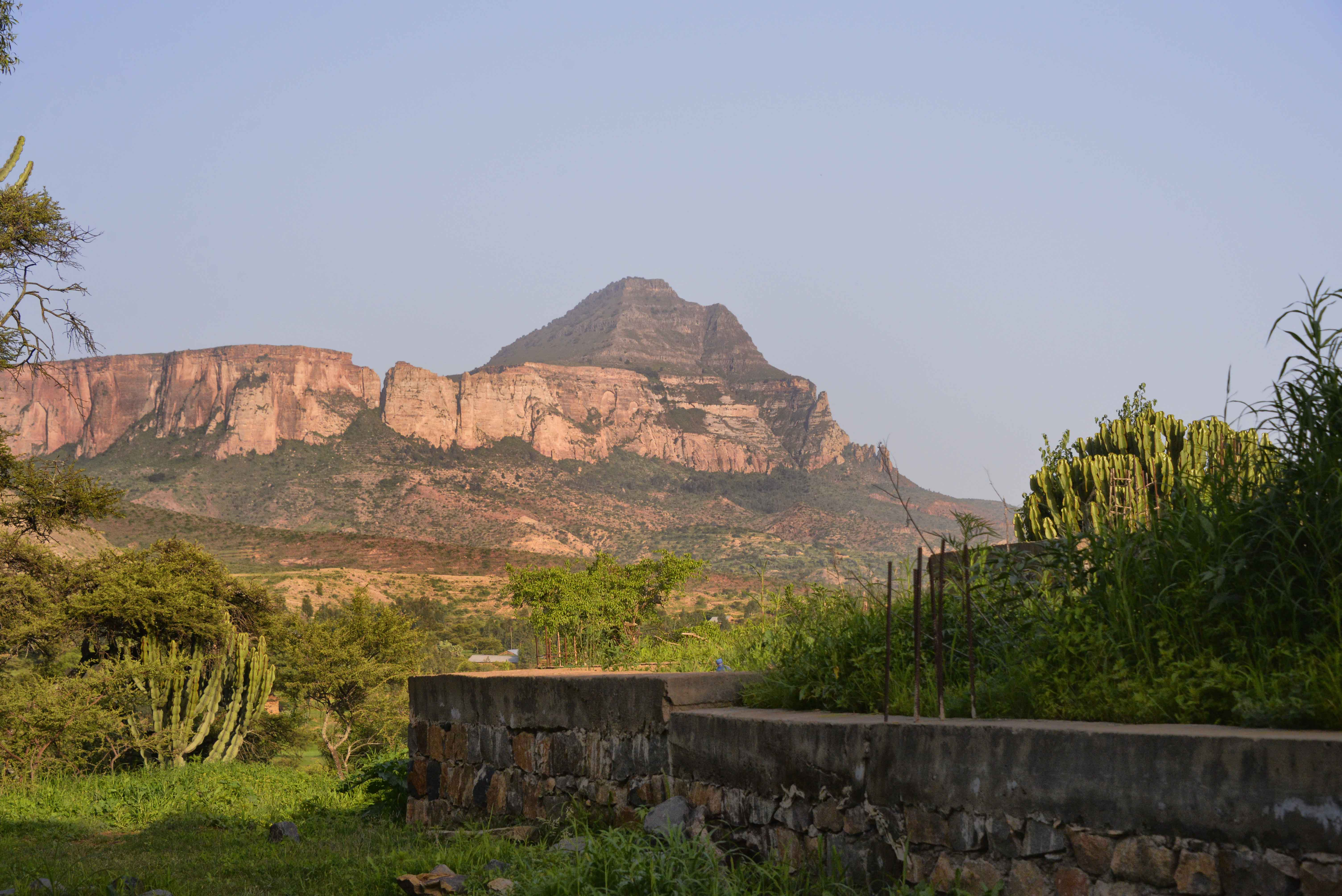

- Flag

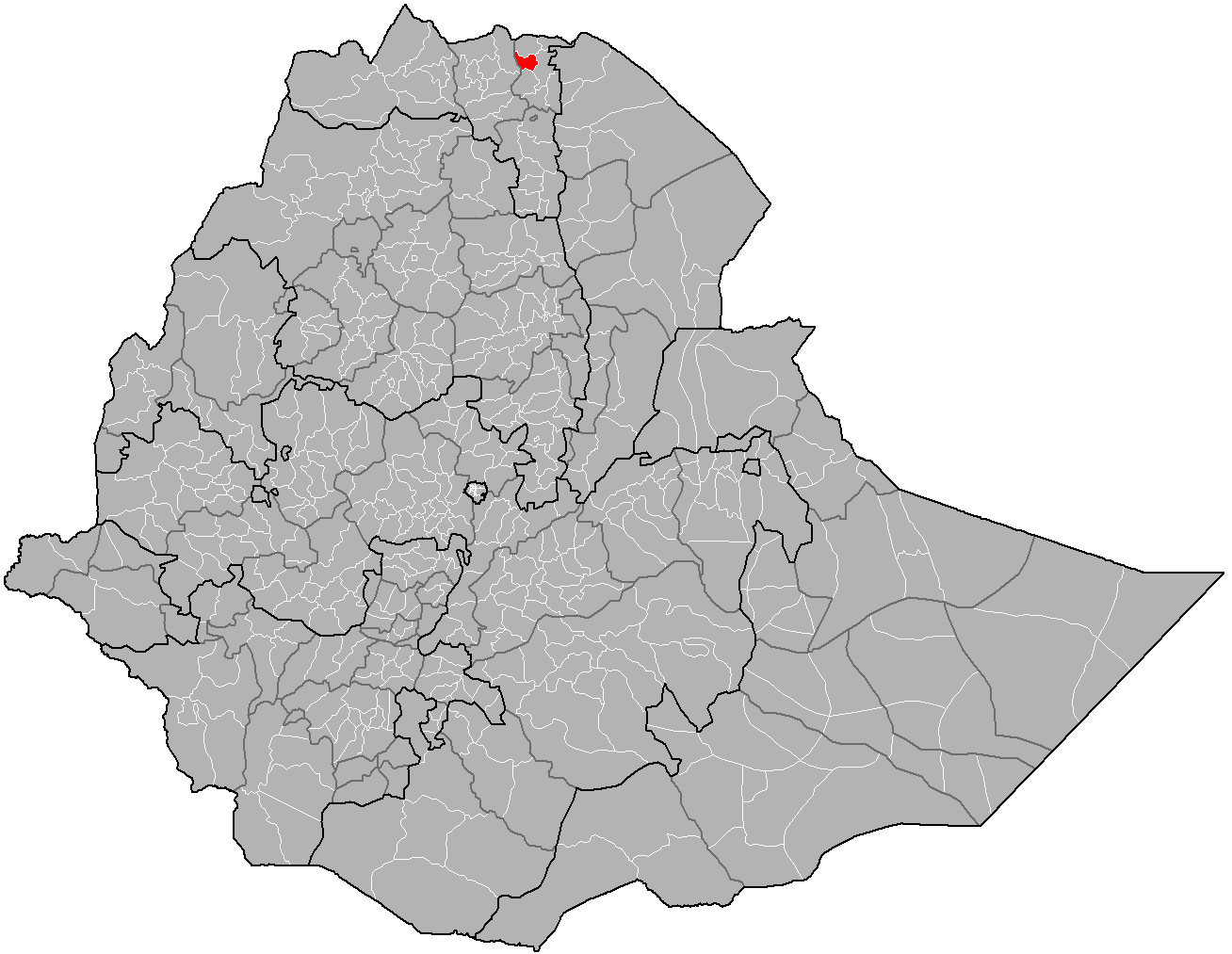
- Country: Ethiopia
- Region: Tigray
- Zone: Misraqawi (Eastern)

Area
  - Total: 1,636.36 km^{2} (631.80 sq mi)

Population (2007)
  - Total: 122,827

Ganta Afeshum (Tigrinya: ጋንታ ኣፈሹም; also transliterated as Ganta ʾAfäšum) is one of the woredas in the Tigray Region of Ethiopia. Part of the Misraqawi Zone, Ganta Afeshum is bordered on the south by Hawzen, on the west by the Mehakelegnaw (Central) Zone, on the north by Gulomahda, and on the east by Saesi Tsaedaemba. Towns in Ganta Afeshum include Bizet. Since the town of Adigrat split off Ganta Afeshum as a separate woreda, it is surrounded by this woreda.

There are several local monolithic churches in this woreda, which include Mariyam Si'it and Samuel Mayaba (abandoned as of 1970). High points in Genta Afeshum include Mount Alequa (3290 meters) and Mount Undale, part of the Mugulat Mountains.

== Demographics ==
Based on the 2007 national census conducted by the Central Statistical Agency of Ethiopia (CSA), this woreda has a total population of 88,644, an increase of 3.79% over the 1994 census, of whom 42,096 are men and 46,548 women; 3,636 or 4.10% are urban inhabitants. With an area of 1,636.36 square kilometres, Ganta Afeshum has a population density of 54.17, which is less than the Zone average of 56.93 persons per square kilometre. A total of 19,301 households were counted in this woreda, resulting in an average of 4.59 persons to a household, and 18,855 housing units. The majority of the inhabitants said they practiced Ethiopian Orthodox Christianity, with 99.14% reporting that as their religion.

The 1994 national census reported a total population for this woreda of 122,827 of whom 58,398 were men and 64,429 were women; 39,561 or 32.21% of its population were urban dwellers. The largest ethnic group reported in Ganta Afeshum was the Tigrayan (98.07%), and Tigrinya was spoken as a first language by 98.56%. The majority of the inhabitants practiced Ethiopian Orthodox Christianity, with 97.28% reporting that as their religion, while 1.66% were Muslim. Concerning education, 29.77% of the population were considered literate, which is greater than the Zone average of 9.01%; 47.64% of children aged 7–12 were in primary school; 8.41% of the children aged 13–14 were in junior secondary school; and 10.59% of the inhabitants aged 15–18 were in senior secondary school. Concerning sanitary conditions, about 83% of the urban houses and 37% of all houses had access to safe drinking water at the time of the census; about 22% of the urban and about 9% of the total had toilet facilities.

== Agriculture ==
A sample enumeration performed by the CSA in 2001 interviewed 20,704 farmers in this woreda, who held an average of 0.37 hectares of land. Of the 7,710 hectares of private land surveyed, 83.38% was under cultivation, 2.67% pasture, 5.15% fallow, 1.95% in woodland, and 6.86% was devoted to other uses. For the land under cultivation in this woreda, 64% was planted in cereals, 8.9% in pulses, 0.61% in oilseeds, and 13 hectares in vegetables. The total area planted in fruit trees was 646 hectares, while 78 were planted in gesho. 72.00% of the farmers both raised crops and livestock, while 25.63% only grew crops and 2.37% only raised livestock. Land tenure in this woreda is distributed amongst 94.88% owning their land, 3.39% renting, and 1.74% holding their land under other forms of tenure.

== Churches and monasteries ==
As of 2013, 72 church institutions were registered in the woreda. Churches and monasteries in the woreda that contain historical manuscripts and artefacts include:

- Nǝḥbi Däbrä Sälam Qǝddus Mikaʾel gädam
- Gänaḥti Däbrä Gännät Qǝddǝst Maryam
- Betä Ḥawaryat Ṣǝrḥa Ṣǝyon gädam
- Bäʿatti Däbrä Mǝḥrät Qǝddus Mikaʾel gädam
- Mäḵan Maryam
- Bet Mäḵaʿ Däbrä Sahǝl Qǝddus Mikaʾel gädam / Gäbrä Mänfäs Qǝddus
- May ʾAbʾa Maryam
- Č̣äḥat Mädḥane ʿAläm
- Läq̱ay Däbrä Mǝḥrät Kidanä Mǝḥrät
- Siʿät Däbrä Gännät Qǝddǝst Maryam
- Qiʿat Däbrä Ṣǝyon Qǝddǝst Maryam
- Mäḵodʿä Däbrä Gännät Kidanä Mǝḥrät gädam
- Märgaḥǝya Däbrä Sälam Qǝddus Mikaʾel
- Dǝbla Däbrä Bǝrhan Yoḥannǝs Mäṭmǝq
- ʾAndel Maryam
- Soṭa Däbrä Sälam Qǝddus Mikaʾel
- Dändera Däbrä Mǝḥrät Qǝddus Mikaʾel
- Ḥawaṣi Qǝddus Gäbrǝʾel and ʾAbrǝqo Qǝddǝst Maryam
- Golʿa Yoḥannǝs Mäṭmǝq
- Qǝta Maryam
- Ḥarennät Maryam Gäbäzäyti
- Qändaʿro Däbrä Ḫayl Qǝddus Qirqos
- Mǝʾǝsar Gwǝḥila Qǝddus Mikaʾel
- Mäläkusäyto Qǝddǝst Maryam
- ʿAddimḥara Däbrä Mädḫanit ʾAbba Yoḥanni
- Mǝngaś Qǝddǝst Maryam
- Däbri Däbrä Zakaryas Qǝddus Giyorgis
- ʾAf Mǝhyaw Qǝddǝst Maryam
- Baḥǝra Qǝddǝst Maryam gädam
- Gwaḥgot Däbrä Ṣǝge ʾIyäsus
