= Adwa Pan-African University =

University in Adwa, Tigray, Ethiopia

- ዓድዋ ፓን ኣፍሪካ ዩኒቨርሲቲ
- Established: April 2017
- Location: Adwa, Ethiopia
- Campus: 1
- Language: English
- Website: www.apau.org

Adwa Pan-African University (Tigrinya: ዓድዋ ፓን ኣፍሪካ ዩኒቨርሲቲ) is a higher education institution under construction in Adwa, Tigray, Ethiopia. The university is named after the historically significant 1896 Battle of Adwa.

Emperor Haile Selassie was the first to propose the establishment of a Pan-African university, where he said future African leaders would be groomed. He offered facilities to host a Pan-African university and proposed the African Standby Force in the form of common defense against colonial type interventions. The foundation of the university was established 24 April 2017 by President Yoweri Museveni and Prime Minister Hailemariam Desalegn. As of 2019, 200 million birr of seed money was provided by the Ethiopian government, and a plot of 150 acres was allotted.
