= Tigray Region =

Tigray ሀገረ ትግራይ (Tigrinya)
- Regional state
- Tigray State
- Flag Seal
- Nickname: The birthplace of Ethiopian civilization
- Motto: "ዘይንድይቦ ጎቦ ዘይንሰግሮ ሩባ" "There are no mountains we would not climb"
- Map of Ethiopia showing Tigray Region
- Coordinates: 14°7′28″N 38°43′26″E
- Country: Ethiopia
- Established: 1991
- Capital: Mekelle

Government
  - Chief Administrator of the Interim Regional Administration: None
  - Deputy Administrator of the Interim Regional Administration: None

Area
  - Total: 53,036 km^{2} (20,477 sq mi)
  - Rank: 5th

Population (2025)
  - Total: 7,467,000
  - Rank: 5th in Ethiopia
  - Density: 140.8/km^{2} (364.6/sq mi)

Demographics
  - Official language: Tigrinya
  - Demonym: Tigrayan
- Time zone: UTC+3 (EAT)
- ISO 3166 code: ET-TI
- HDI (2021): 0.522 low · 5th of 11
- Website: www.ethiopia.gov.et/regional-states/tigray-regional-state/

The Tigray Region (Note: /ˈtɪɡraɪ/, /ˈtɪɡreɪ/ or /ˈtiːˈɡreɪ/; Tigrinya: ክልል ትግራይ; Amharic: ትግራይ ክልል, romanized: Tigrāi kilil) (or simply Tigray; officially the Tigray National Regional State) (Note: Tigrinya: ብሔራዊ ክልላዊ መንግስቲ ትግራይ, romanized: Bəḥerawi Kəllelawi Mängəśti Təgrai; formerly known as Region 1.) is the northernmost regional state in Ethiopia. The Tigray Region is the homeland of the Tigrayan, Irob and Kunama people. Its capital and largest city is Mekelle. Tigray is the fifth-largest by area, the fourth-most populous, and the fifth-most densely populated of the 14 regional states. Tigray is bordered by Eritrea to the north, the Amhara Region to the south, Sudan to the west, and Afar Region to the east .

Tigray's official language is Tigrinya, the same language found in Eritrea. The Tigray region had an estimated pre-Tigray war population of 7,070,260. The majority of the population (c. 80%) are farmers, contributing 46% to the regional gross domestic product (2009). The highlands have the highest population density, especially in eastern and central Tigray. The much less densely populated lowlands comprise 48% of Tigray's area. Although the percentage of Muslims in Tigray as of 2007 was approximately 4%, it has been historically Islam's doorway to the region and to Africa at large. Approximately 95.6% of Tigrayans are Orthodox Christian.

The government of Tigray consists of the executive branch, led by the president, General Tadesse Werede; the legislative branch, which comprises the state council; and the judicial branch, which is led by the state supreme court. In early November 2020, a conflict between the Tigray People's Liberation Front (TPLF) and the Ethiopian federal government (with support from Eritrea) rapidly escalated into the Tigray War, destabilizing the region, displacing millions of people. There were around 600,000 civilian deaths and as many as 70,000 combatants were killed and up to 18,000 injured as a result of the war.

== History ==
=== 3rd millennium to 1st century BC ===
Tigray is often regarded as the cradle of Ethiopian civilization. Its landscape has many historic monuments. Three major monotheistic religions, Judaism, Christianity, and Islam arrived in Axum through the Red Sea.

Given the presence of a large temple complex and fertile surroundings, the capital of the 3,000-year-old kingdom of Dʿmt may have been near present-day Yeha. Dʿmt developed irrigation schemes, used the plough, grew millet, and made iron tools and weapons. Some modern historians, including Stuart Munro-Hay, Rodolfo Fattovich, Ayele Bekerie, Cain Felder, and Ephraim Isaac consider this civilization to be indigenous, although Sabaean-influenced due to the latter's dominance of the Red Sea. Others, including Joseph Michels, Henri de Contenson, Tekletsadik Mekuria, and Stanley Burstein, have viewed Dʿmt as the result of a mixture of Sabaean and indigenous peoples. The most recent research, however, shows that Ge'ez, the ancient Semitic language spoken in Tigray, Eritrea, and northern Ethiopia in ancient times, is not likely to have been derived from Sabaean. There is evidence of a Semitic-speaking presence in Tigray, Eritrea, and northern Ethiopia at least as early as 2000 BC. It is now believed that Sabaean influence was minor, limited to a few localities, and disappearing after a few decades or a century, It may have represented a trading or military colony, in some sort of symbiosis or military alliance with the civilization of Dʿmt or some other proto-Aksumite state.

After the fall of Dʿmt in the 5th century BC, the plateau came to be dominated by smaller, unknown successor kingdoms. This lasted until the rise of one of these polities during the first century BC, the Aksumite Kingdom, which succeeded in reunifying the area and is, in effect, the ancestor of medieval and modern states in Eritrea and Ethiopia using the name "Ethiopia" as early as the 4th century.

=== 1st to 10th century AD ===
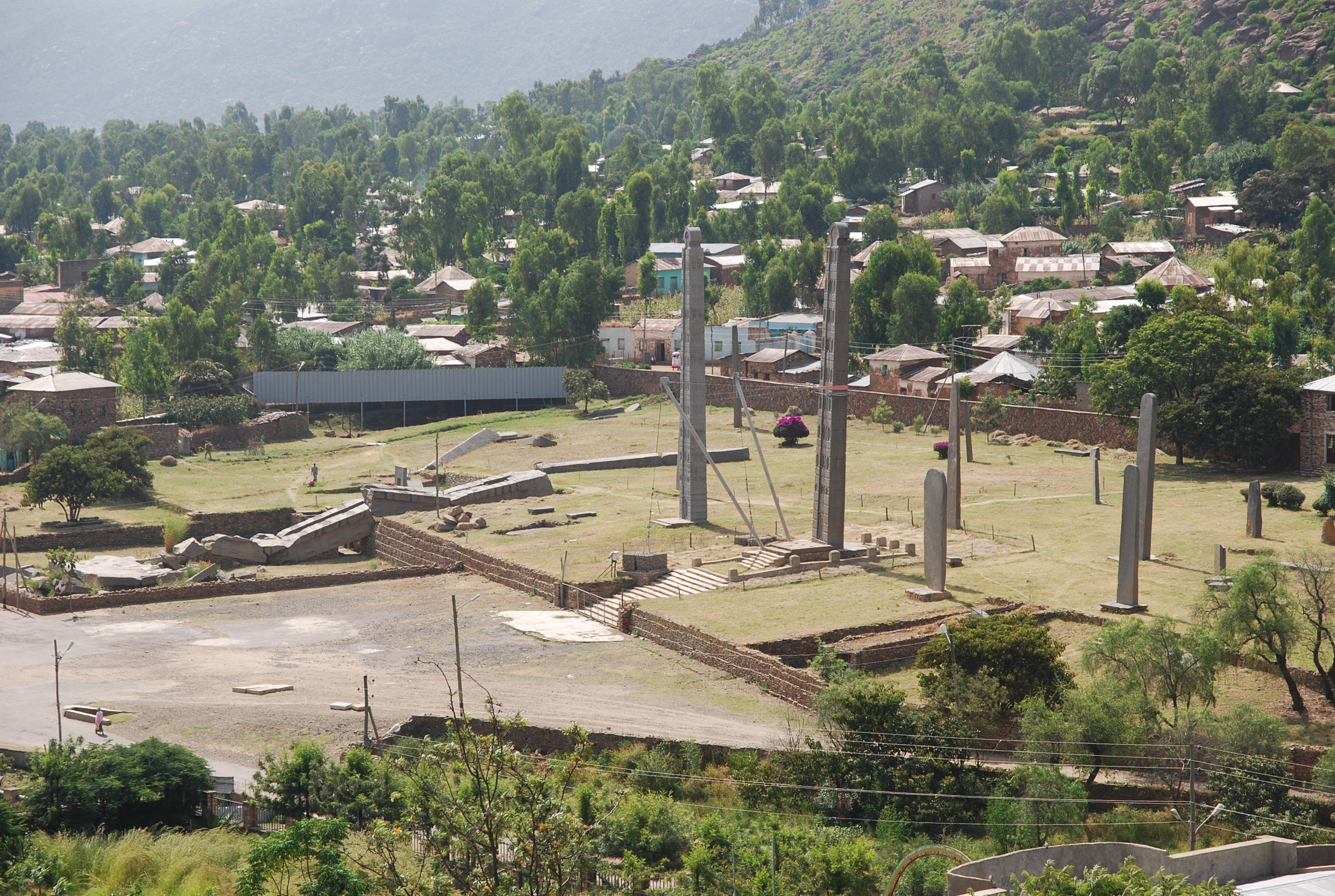
Axum Stele in the city Axum.

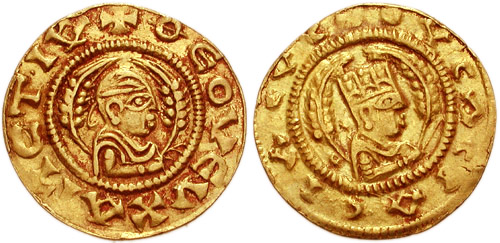
Aksumite gold coins.

The Kingdom of Aksum was a trading empire rooted in Tigray. It existed from approximately 100–940 AD, growing from the proto-Aksumite Iron Age period c. 4th century BC to achieve prominence by the 1st century AD.

According to the Book of Axum, Axum's first capital, Mazaber, was built by Itiyopis, son of Cush. The capital was later moved to Aksum in northern Ethiopia.

The Empire of Aksum, at its height, at times extended across most of present-day Eritrea, Ethiopia, Djibouti, Sudan, Yemen and Saudi Arabia. The capital city of the empire was Axum, now in northern Ethiopia. Today a smaller community, the city of Axum was once a bustling metropolis and a cultural and economic hub. Two hills and two streams lie on the east and west expanses of the city; perhaps providing the initial impetus for settling this area. Along the hills and plain outside the city, the Aksumites had cemeteries with elaborate grave stones, which are called stelae, or obelisks. Other important cities included Yeha, Hawulti-Melazo, Matara, Adulis, and Qohaito, the last three of which are now in Eritrea. By the reign of Endybis in the late 3rd century, Aksum had begun minting its own currency and was named by Mani as one of the four great powers of his time, along with China and the Sassanid and Roman empires. It converted to Christianity in 325 or 328 under King Ezana and was the first state to use the image of the cross on its coins.

Located in Negash, Tigray, the 7th century Al-Nejashi Mosque is considered the oldest in Africa and serves as a symbol of early Islam's asylum in the Aksumite Kingdom. Despite sustaining damage during the 2020 Tigray War, the heritage site, which holds the tombs of the Prophet Muhammed's companions, has undergone restoration efforts.

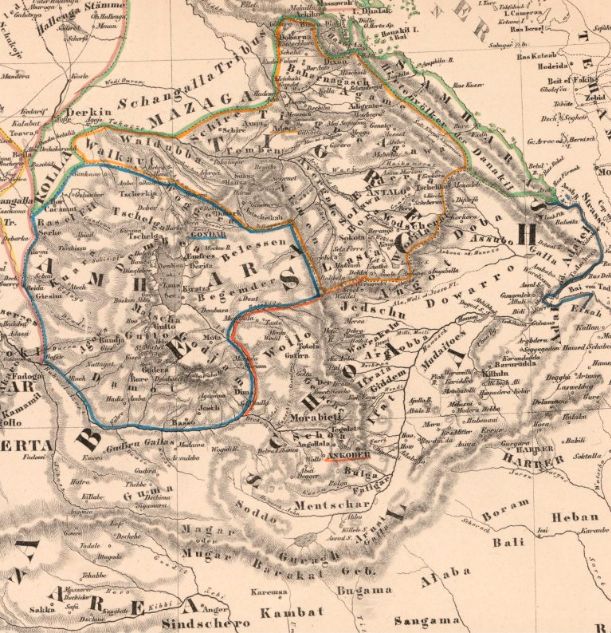
Handtke's map is 39 cm wide and 66 cm tall, and is printed on paper that has been bonded to fabric. The scale is approximately 1:5,600,000; relief is shown by short lines representing slope aspect and a general sense of steepness (hachures).The work was created in one of the few stronger cartographic publishing houses in 19th century Germany, managed by Carl Flemming (1806–1878). Flemming was aided by cartographer Friedrich Handtke (1815–1879), who worked on nearly every map assignment for the firm.

=== 11th to 19th century AD ===
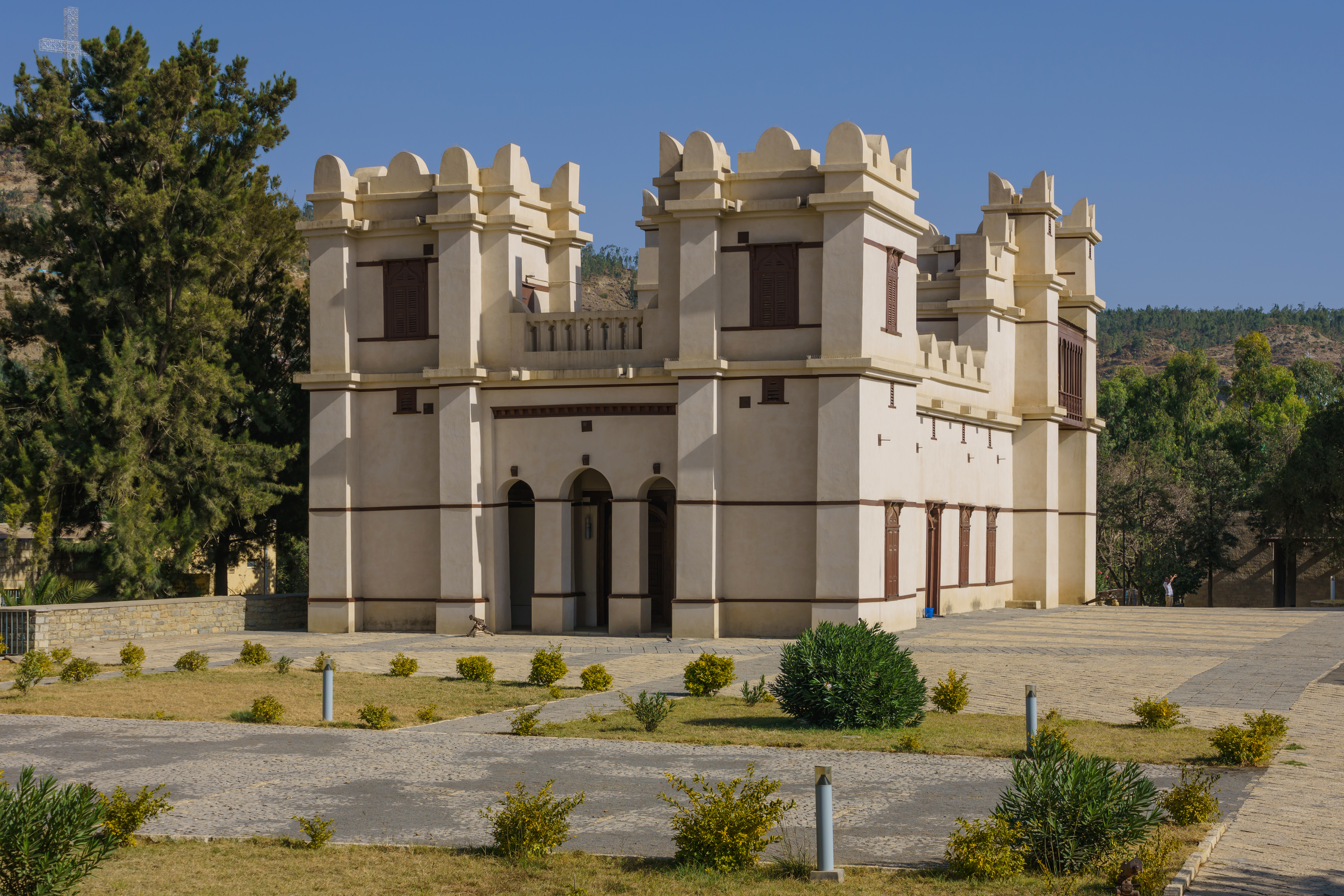
Mekelle palace of Emperor Yohannes IV (emperor of the whole Ethiopian Empire).

In the 11th century the Tigrinya-speaking lands (Tigray-Mareb Melash) were divided into two provinces, separated by the Mereb River, by the newly enthroned Agaw emperors. The governor of the northern province received the title Bahre Negash (Ruler of the sea), whereas the governor of the southern province was given the title of Tigray Mekonen (Lord of Tigray). The Portuguese Jesuit Emanuele Baradas's work titled "Do reino de Tigr", written in 1633–34, states that the "Reino de Tigr" (Kingdom of Tigray) extended from Hamasien to Temben, from the borders of Dankel to the Adwa mountain. He also stated that Tigray-Mereb Melash was divided into 24 smaller political units (principalities), twelve of which were located south of the Mereb and governed by the Tigray Mekonen, based in Enderta. The other twelve were located north of the Mereb, under the authority of the Bahre Negash, based in the district of Serae.

The Book of Aksum, written and compiled mainly in the period from the sixteenth to seventeenth centuries, shows a traditional schematic map of Tigray with the city of Aksum at its center, surrounded by the 13 principal provinces: "Tembien, Shire, Serae, Hamasien, Bur, Sam'a, Agame, Amba Senayt, Garalta, Enderta, Sahart and Abergele."

During the Middle Ages, the position of Tigray Mekonnen ("Governor of Tigray") was established to rule over the area. Other districts included Akele Guzay (now part of Eritrea), and the kingdom of the Bahr negus, who ruled much of what is now Eritrea and Shire district and town in Western Tigray. At the time when Tigray Mekonnen existed simultaneously with that of Bahr negus, their frontier seems to have been the Mareb River, which is currently constitutes the border between the Ethiopian province of Tigray and Eritrea.

After the loss of power of the Bahr negus in the aftermath of Bahr negus Yeshaq's rebellions, the title of Tigray mekonnen gained power in relation to the Bahr negus and at times included ruling over parts of what is now Eritrea, especially in the 19th century. By the unsettled Zemene Mesafint period ("Era of the Princes"), both designations had declined to little more than empty titles, and the lord who succeeded them used (and received from the Emperor) the title of either Ras or Dejazmach, beginning with Ras Mikael Sehul. Rulers of Tigray such as Ras Wolde Selassie alternated with others, chiefly those of Begemder or Yejju, as warlords to maintain the Ethiopian monarchy during the Zemene Mesafint.

In the mid-19th century, the lords of Tembien and Enderta managed to establish an overlordship of Tigray. One of its members, Dejazmach Kahsay Mercha, ascended the imperial throne in 1872 under the name Yohannes IV. Following his 1889 death in the Battle of Metemma, the Ethiopian throne came under the control of the king of Shewa, and the center of power shifted south and away from Tigray.

=== 20th century ===
In 1943, a rebellion broke out all over southern and eastern Tigray under the slogan, "there is no government; let's organize and govern ourselves". Throughout Enderta Awraja, including Mekelle, Didibadergiajen, Hintalo, Saharti, Samre and Wajirat, Raya Awraja, Kilte-Awlaelo Awraja and Tembien Awraja, local assemblies, called gerreb, were formed. The gerreb sent representatives to a central congress, called the shengo, which elected leaders and established a military command system. Although the first Woyane rebellion of 1943 had shortcomings as a prototype revolution, historians agree that it involved a fairly high level of spontaneity and peasant initiative. It demonstrated considerable popular participation and reflected widely shared grievances. The uprising was specifically directed against the central "Shoan Amhara" regime of Haile Selassie I to rile support, despite Tigrayan imperial elite being collaborators and beneficiaries of the regime.

==== Ethiopian Civil War ====
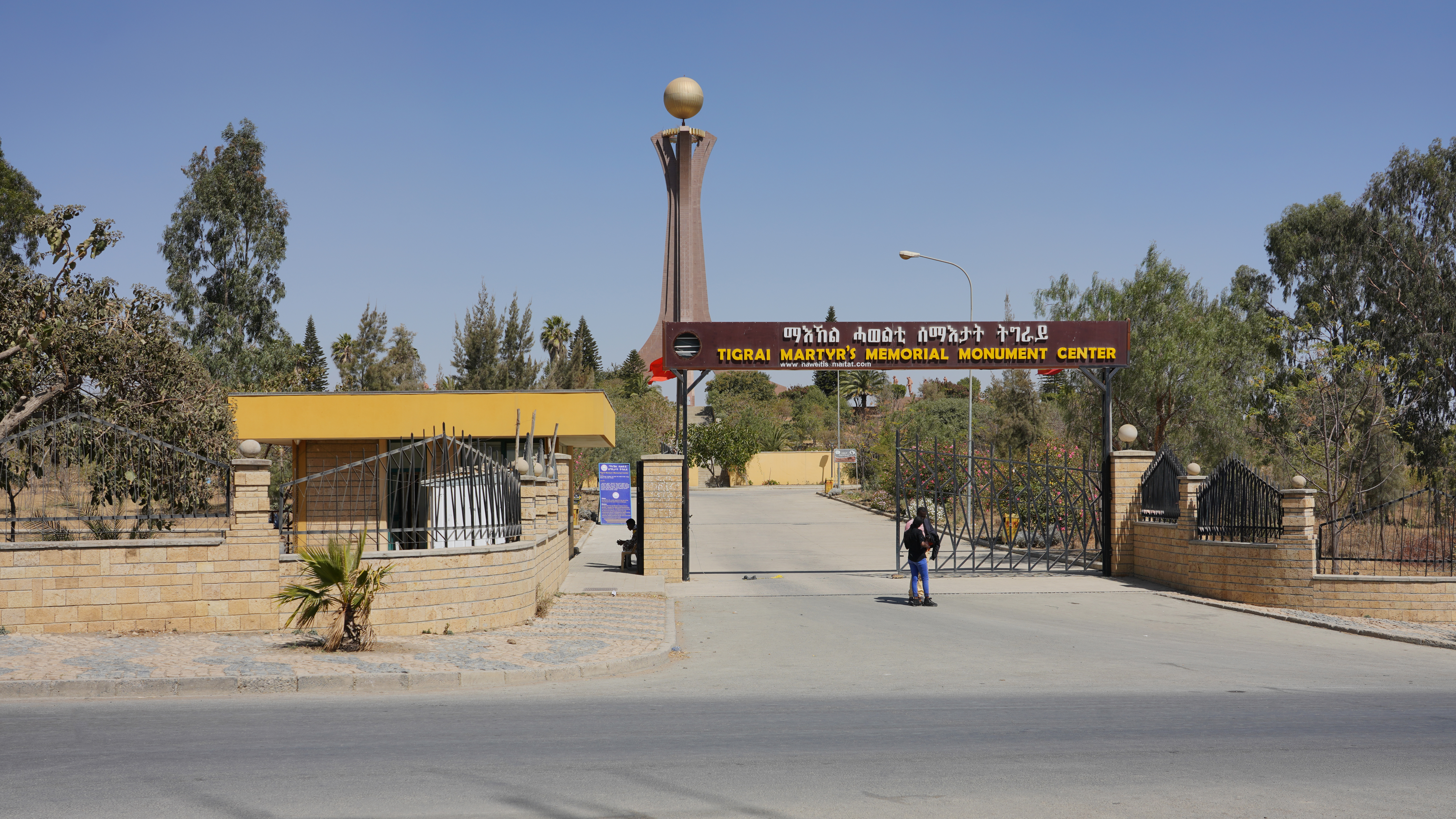
Memorial in Mekelle to more than 60,000 TPLF fighters who died and over 100,000 fighters who were injured in the overthrow of the Marxist Derg regime in 1991.

Following the outbreak of the Ethiopian Revolution in February 1974, the first signal of any mass uprising was the actions of the soldiers of the 4th Brigade of the 4th Army Division in Nagelle in southern Ethiopia. The Coordinating Committee of the Armed Forces, Police, and Territorial Army, or the Derg (Ge'ez "Committee"), was officially announced 28 June 1974 by a group of military officers. The committee elected Major Mengistu Haile Mariam as its chairman and Major Atnafu Abate as its vice-chairman. In July 1974, the Derg obtained key concessions from the emperor, Haile Selassie, which included the power to arrest not only military officers but government officials at every level. Soon both former Prime Ministers Tsehafi Taezaz Aklilu Habte-Wold and Endalkachew Makonnen, along with most of their cabinets, most regional governors, many senior military officers and officials of the Imperial court were imprisoned. In August 1974, after a proposed constitution creating a constitutional monarchy was presented to the emperor, the Derg began a program of dismantling the imperial government in order to forestall further developments in that direction. The Derg deposed and imprisoned the emperor on 12 September 1974.

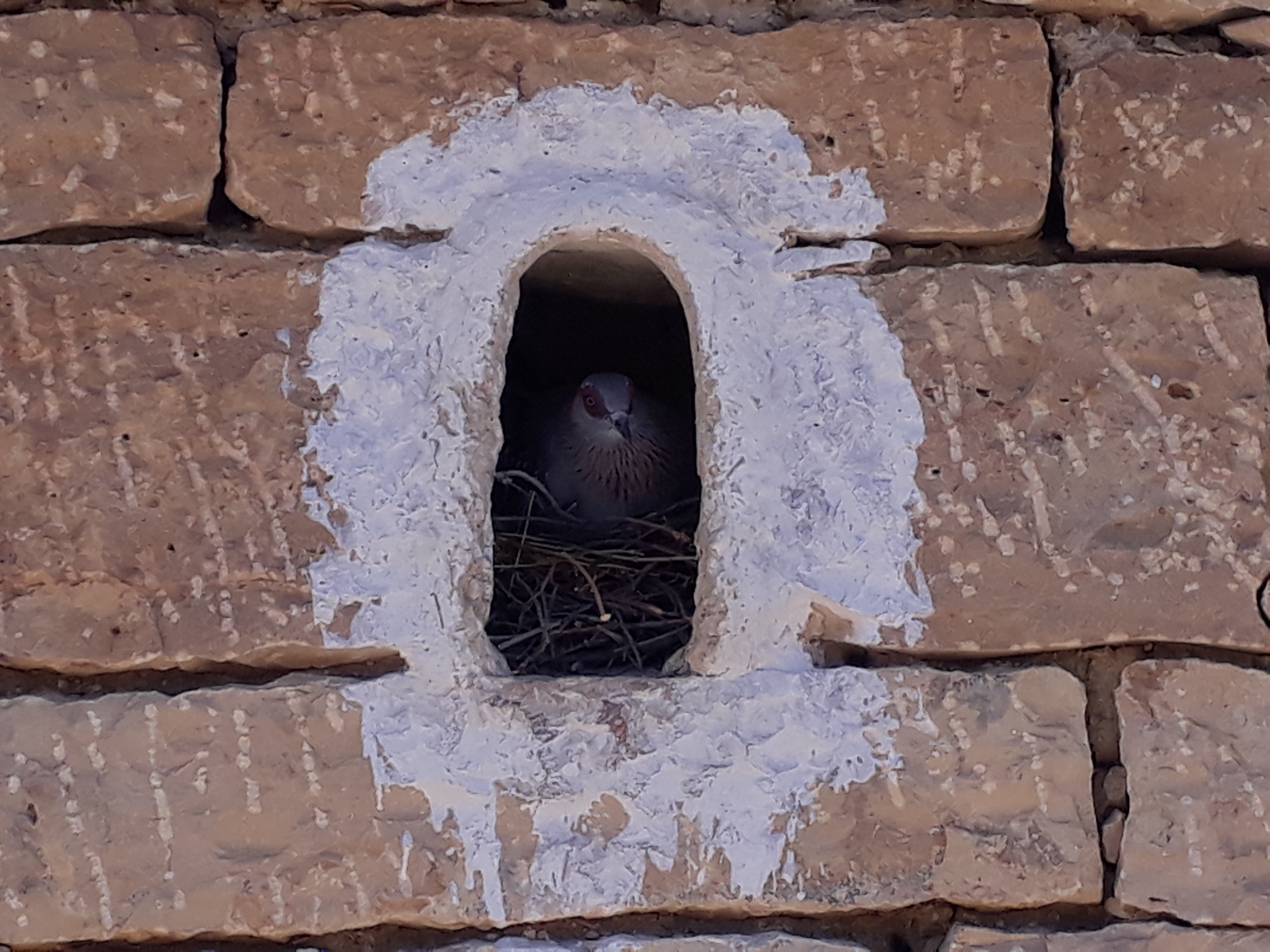
Nest box for Columba guinea (considered a symbol of peace) in the wall of a homestead in Zerfenti, a village in Tigray where hundreds were killed by Derg bombings.

In addition, the Derg in 1975 nationalized most industries and private and somewhat secure urban real-estate holdings. But mismanagement, corruption, and general hostility to the Derg's violent rule, coupled with the draining effects of constant warfare with the separatist guerrilla movements in Tigray, led to a drastic fall in general productivity of food and cash crops. In October 1978, the Derg announced the National Revolutionary Development Campaign to mobilize human and material resources to transform the economy, which led to a Ten-Year Plan (1984/85–1993/94) to expand agricultural and industrial output, forecasting a 6.5% growth in GDP and a 3.6% rise in per capita income. Instead per capita income declined 0.8% over this period. Famine scholar Alex de Waal observes that while the famine that struck the country in the mid-1980s is usually ascribed to drought, "closer investigation shows that widespread drought occurred only some months after the famine was already under way". Hundreds of thousands fled economic misery, conscription, and political repression, and went to live in neighboring countries and all over the Western world, creating an Ethiopian diaspora.

Toward the end of January 1991, a coalition of rebel forces, the Ethiopian People's Revolutionary Democratic Front (EPRDF) captured Gondar, the ancient capital city, Bahar Dar, and Dessie.

==== Postwar ====
John Young, who visited the area several times in the early 1990s, attributes this delay in part to "central budget restraint, structural readjustment, and lack of awareness by government bureaucrats in Addis Ababa of conditions in the province", but notes "an equally significant obstacle was posed by an entrenched, and largely Oromo and Southern-dominated, central bureaucracy which used its power to block government-authorized funds from reaching Tigray". At the same time, a growing urban middle class of traders, businessmen and government officials emerged that was suspicious of and distant from the victorious EPRDF. From 1991 to 2001, the president of Tigray was Gebru Asrat. In 1998, war erupted between Eritrea and Ethiopia over a portion of territory that had been administered as part of Tigray, which included the town of Badme. A 2002 United Nations decision awarded much of this land to Eritrea, but Ethiopia did not accept the ruling until 2018, when a bilateral agreement ended the border conflict. The text of this agreement has not been publicly availed.

=== 21st century ===
Between April 2001 and December 2010, Tsegay Berhe of the Tigray People’s Liberation Front (TPLF) served as President of the Tigray Region. A veteran of the TPLF and former vice-president (1991–2001), Berhe also held the position of vice-chairman of the party during this tenure. In 2010, Berhe was succeeded by Abay Weldu, who served as regional president from 2010 until January 2018 and concurrently led the TPLF from September 2012 to November 2017. Weldu came to power amid a rapidly centralized political structure under the Ethiopian People’s Revolutionary Democratic Front (EPRDF), a coalition led by TPLF.

During their administrations, Tigray’s regional government benefitted from significant fiscal autonomy. State‑linked conglomerates like EFFORT and METEC funnelled resources into regional coffers, making Tigray one of the most financially empowered regions in Ethiopia. This economic clout helped the regional TPLF maintain political dominance, though critics argue that such financial strength also entrenched patronage networks and limited political pluralism. Nationally, EPRDF—which included the TPLF as dominant member since its founding in 1989—held control over Ethiopia’s ethnic‑federal system. The 2005 national parliamentary elections marked a turning point; serious opposition gains were met with strong government crackdowns, and protests later erupted in 2016–2017 demanding reforms and challenging the longstanding one‑party dominance.

==== 2020 administrative reorganisation ====
Between 2018 and 2020, as part of a reform aimed to deepen and strengthen decentralisation, woredas were reorganised, and new boundaries established. As smaller towns had been growing, they had started providing a larger range of services, such as markets and even banks, that encouraged locals to travel there rather than to their formal woreda centre. However, these locals still had to travel to their local woreda centre for most local government services – often in a different direction. In 2018 and 2019, after multiple village discussions that were often vigorous in the more remote areas, 21 independent urban administrations were added and other boundaries re-drawn, resulting in an increase from 35 to 88 woredas in January 2020.

==== Tigray War ====
Following the 2020 Tigray regional election, on 4 November, after the attacks by TDF on Northern Command units in Tigray and missiles sent to Eritrea, the Ethiopian and Eritrean militaries launched counterattacks. Ethiopian forces advanced through southern Tigray, while Eritrean troops occupied northern border towns.

Warfare, the COVID-19 pandemic in Ethiopia, and a locust outbreak contributed to an emergency food situation in the region by January 2021. Approximately two million people faced food shortages, with a critical situation in Shire Inda Selassie, hosting 100,000 refugees. The Famine Early Warning Systems Network indicated that parts of central and eastern Tigray were likely in emergency phase 4, a step below famine.

==== After the Tigray War ====
After the Tigray War (2020–2022), which resulted in an estimated 600,000 deaths, the Tigray region faced ongoing instability. A peace agreement in November 2022 led to the early 2023 formation of the Interim Regional Administration of Tigray, but the region struggled with implementing key provisions, such as the return of displaced people. In 2025, tensions resurfaced when Tigray’s interim president, Getachew Reda, fled to Addis Ababa after a faction led by former TPLF leader Debretsion Gebremichael seized control. The power struggle sparked fears of renewed conflict. In response, Prime Minister Abiy Ahmed invited Tigrayans to suggest a new leader via email and extended the interim administration’s mandate. This development followed internal struggles, including a coup attempt and clashes, as well as growing concerns over tensions with neighboring Eritrea, which added to the regional instability. In September 2026, the region would see renewed conflict as part of the 2026 Ethiopian Offensive.

== Geography ==
=== Location and size ===
Tigray is situated between 12° – 15°N and 36° 30' – 40° 30'E.

A 2006 national statistics report stated the land area as 50,079 km^{2} (19,336 sq mi). The 2011 National Statistics gave an area of 41,410 km^{2} (15,990 sq mi), but the sum of the figures it gave for the Tigray zones was substantially different, rendering the 2011 report internally inconsistent. The figure of 53,036 km^{2} (20,477 sq mi) is supported by the Google Maps area calculator demonstrated in this article.

=== Geology ===
==== Overview ====
The East African Orogeny led to the growth of a mountain chain in the Precambrian (up to 800 Ma [million years ago]), which was largely eroded afterwards. Around 600 Ma, the Gondwana break-up led to the presence of tectonic structures and a Palaeozoic planation surface, that extents to the north and west of the Dogu'a Tembien massif.

Subsequently, there was the deposition of sedimentary and volcanic formations, from older (at the foot of the massif) to younger, near the summits. From Palaeozoic to Triassic, Tigray was located near the South Pole. The (reactivate) Precambrian extensional faults guided the deposition of glacial sediments (Edaga Arbi Glacials and Enticho Sandstone). Later alluvial plain sediments were deposited (Adigrat Sandstone). The break-up of Gondwana (Late Palaeozoic to Early Triassic) led to an extensional tectonic phase, what caused the lowering of large parts of the Horn of Africa. As a consequence a marine transgression occurred, leading to the deposition of marine sediments (Antalo Limestone and Agula Shale). The region has an estimated 3.89 billion tons of mostly "excellent" quality oil shale.

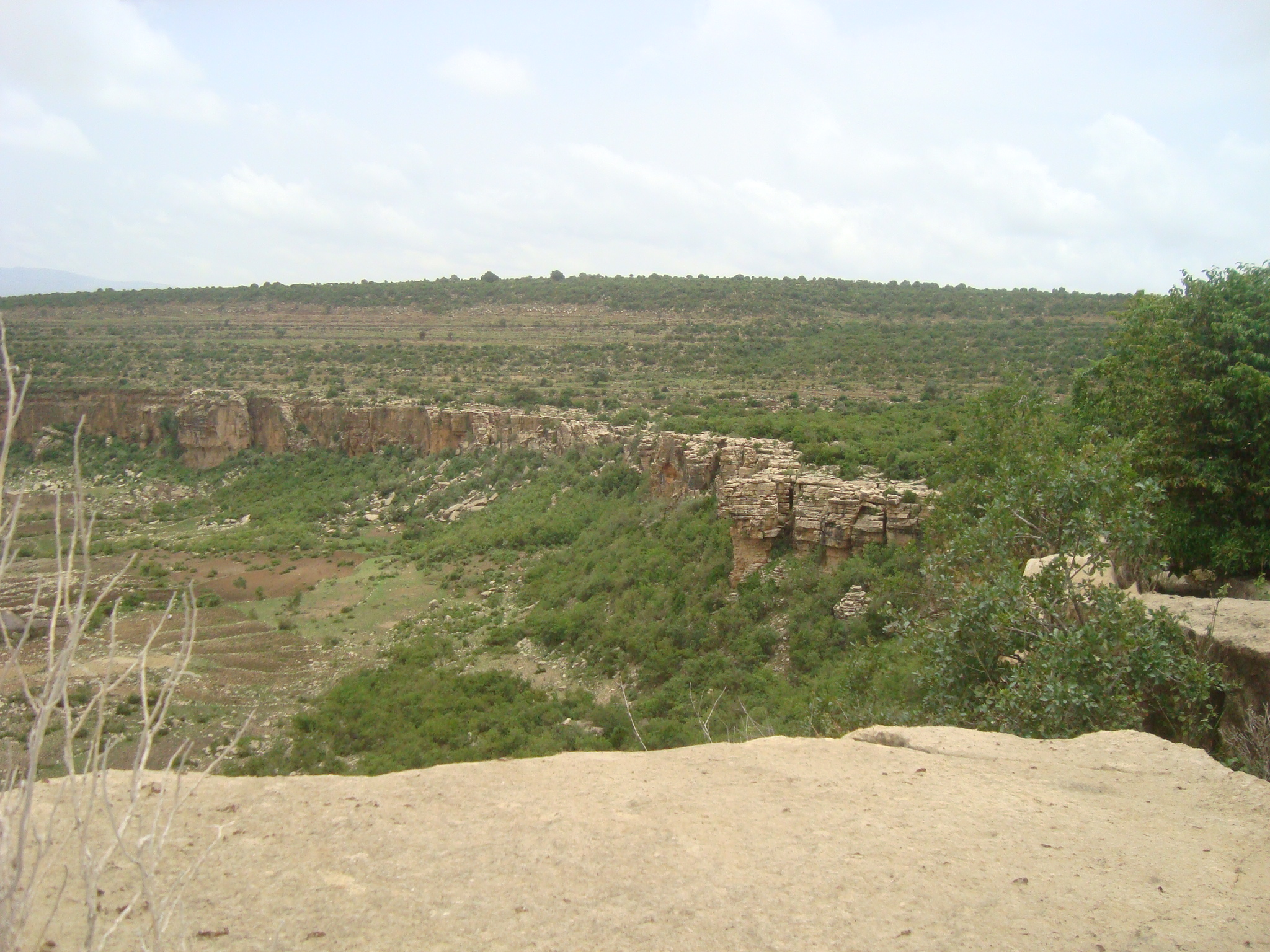
The Antalo Limestone cliff at Mishlam in the southeastern part of Dogu'a Tembien

At the end of the Mesozoic tectonic phase, a new (Cretaceous) planation took place. After that, the deposition of continental sediments (Amba Aradam Formation) indicates the presence of less shallow seas, probably caused by a regional uplift. At the beginning of the Caenozoic, there was a relative tectonic quiescence, during which the Amba Aradam Sandstones were partially eroded, which led to the formation of a new planation surface.

In the Eocene, the Afar plume, a broad regional uplift, deformed the lithosphere, leading to the eruption of flood basalts. Three major formations may be distinguished: lower basalts, interbedded lacustrine deposits and upper basalts. Almost at the same time, the Mekelle Dolerite intruded into the Mesozoic sediments, following joints and faults.

A new magma intrusion occurred in the Early Miocene, which gave rise to phonolite plugs, mainly in the Adwa area and also in Dogu'a Tembien. The present geomorphology is marked by deep valleys, eroded as a result of the regional uplift. Throughout the Quaternary, deposition of alluvium and freshwater tufa occurred in the valley bottoms.

==== Fossils ====
In Tigray, there are two main fossil-bearing geological units. The Antalo Limestone (upper Jurassic) is the largest. Its marine deposits comprise mainly benthic marine invertebrates. Also, the Tertiary lacustrine deposits, interbedded in the basalt formations, contain a range of silicified mollusc fossils.

In the Antalo Limestone: large Paracenoceratidae cephalopods (nautilus); Nerineidae indet.; sea urchins; Rhynchonellid brachiopod; crustaceans; coral colonies; crinoid stems.

In the Tertiary silicified lacustrine deposits: Pila (gastropod); Lanistes sp.; Pirenella conica; and land snails (Achatinidae indet.).

All snail shells, both fossil and recent, are called t'uyo in Tigrinya language, which means 'helicoidal'.

==== Traditional uses of rock ====
As Tigray holds a wide variety of rock types, there is expectedly a varied use of rock.

- Natural stone masonry. Preferentially, the easier shaped limestone and sandstone are used to build homesteads and churches, but particularly in the upland areas, basalt is also used. Traditionally, fermented mud will be used as mortar
- Fencing of homesteads, generally in dry stones
- Church bells, generally three elongated plates in phonolite or clinkstone, with different tonalities
- Milling stone: for this purpose plucked-bedrock pits, small rock-cut basins that naturally occur in rivers with kolks, are excavated from the river bed and further shaped. Milling is done at home using an elongated small boulder
- Door and window lintels, prepared from rock types that frequently have an elongated shape (sandstone, phonolite, limestone), or that are easily shaped (tufa)
- Troughs for livestock watering and feeding, generally hewn from tufa
- Footpath paving, generally done as community work. Some very ancient paved footpaths occur on major communication lines dating back to the period before the introduction of the automobile
- foot travellers stop, pray and put an additional stone
- Stones collected from farmlands in order to free space for the crop, and heaped in typical rounded metres-high heaps, called zala
- Contour bunding or gedeba: terrace walls in dry stone, typically laid out along the contour for sake of soil conservation
- Check dams or qetri in gullies for sake of gully erosion control
- Cobble stones, used for paving secondary streets in the towns. Generally limestone is used.

==== Major mountains ====
- Ferrah Imba, 3954 metres, summit of the Tsibet massif in Endamekoni woreda (12°50′34″N 39°31′03″E), and highest peak of Tigray
- Imba Alaje, 3438 metres, in Alaje woreda (12°59′39″N 39°30′13″E)
- Mugulat, 3263 metres, in Ganta Afeshum woreda (14°16′N 39°25′E); one of its spurs is crossed by the Siqurto foot tunnel
- Asimba, 3199 metres, in Irob woreda (14°26′N 39°36′E)
- Upper plateaus of the Atsbi Horst at 3057 metres in Atsbi Wenberta woreda (14°03′N 39°43′E)
- Maebino, 3031 metres, in Irob woreda (14°27′N 39°33′E)
- Imba Tsion, 2917 metres, in Hawzen woreda (14°06′N 39°26′E)
- Ekli Imba, 2799 metres, summit of the Arebay massif in Degua Tembien woreda (13°43′N 39°16′E)
- Imba Aradom – sometimes transliterated as Amba Aradam, 2756 metres, in Hintalo Wajirat woreda (13°20′N 39°31′E)
- Soloda, 2436 metres, part of the Adwa plugs in Adwa woreda (14°11′N 38°54′E)
- Imba Neway, 2388 metres, in Abergele (woreda)(13°16′N 38°57′E)
- Imba Aleguwen, 2273 metres, in Tsimbla(13°56′N 38°06′E)

=== Water challenge ===
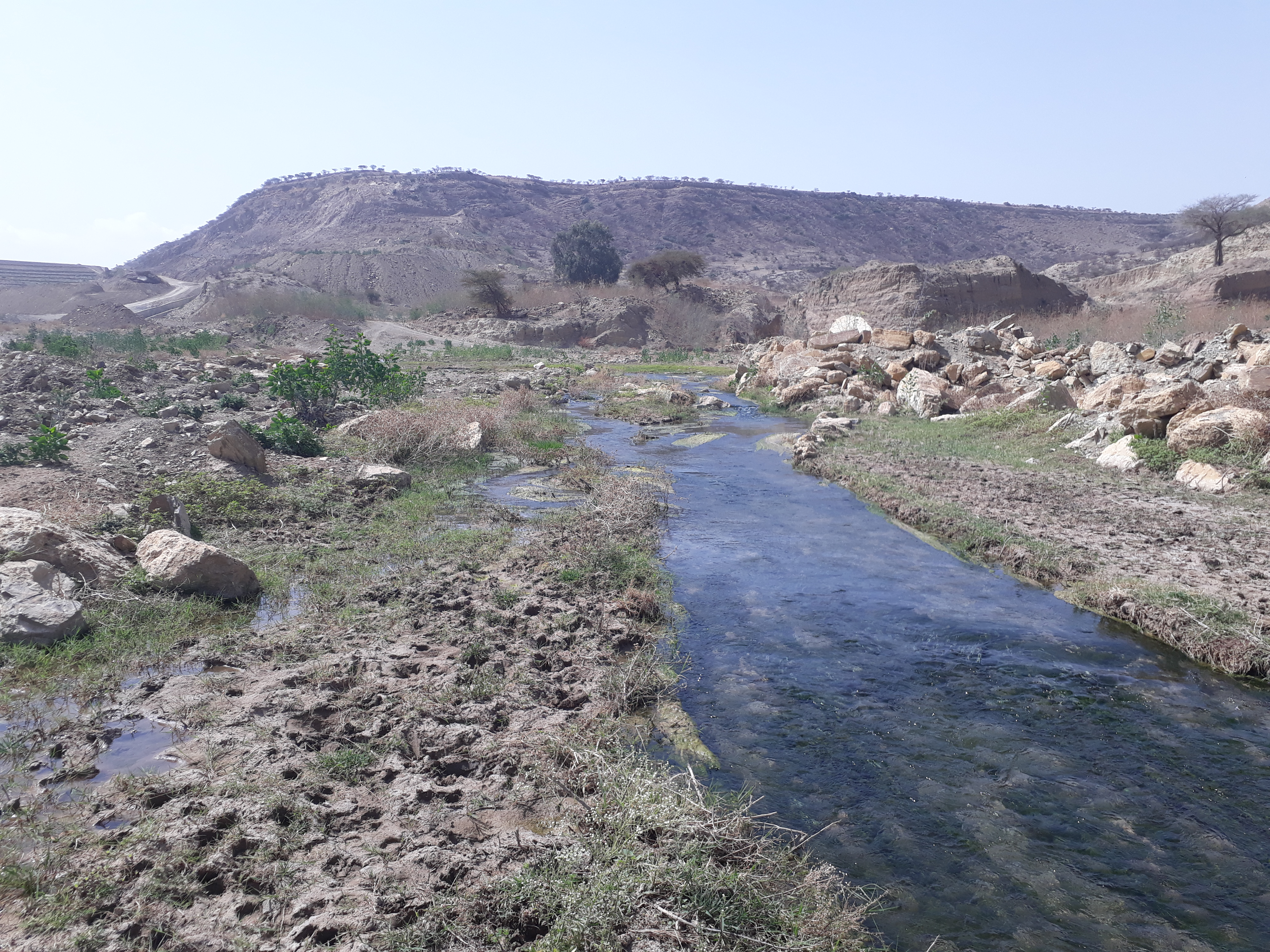
Regularised stream, fed by Gereb Segen dam

Overall, the region is semi-arid. The wet season lasts only for a couple of months. The farmers are adapted to this, but the problem arises when rains are less than normal. Another major challenge is providing water to urban areas. Smaller towns, but particularly Mekelle, face endemic water shortages. Reservoirs have been built, but their management is sub-optimal.

=== Wildlife ===
==== Large mammals ====
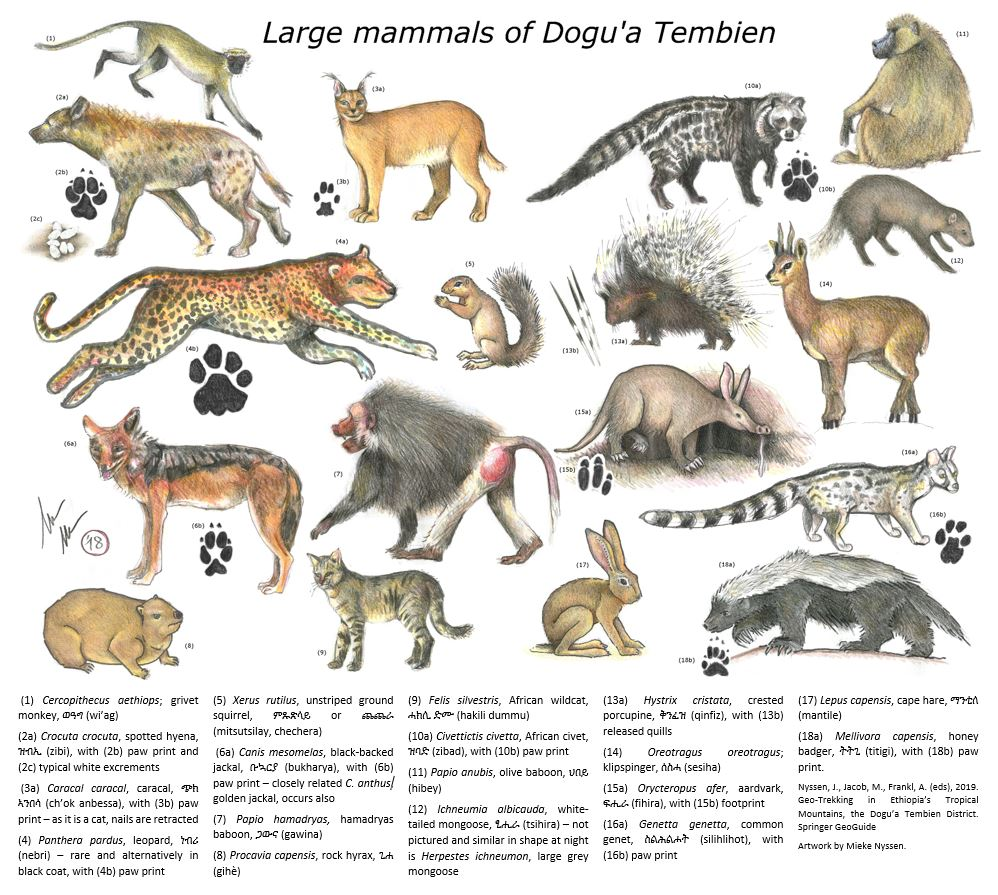

Besides elephants in Western Tigray and the endemic gelada baboon on the highest mountains, large mammals in the region, with scientific (italics), English and Tigrinya language names, are:

- Cercopithecus aethiops; grivet monkey, ወዓግ (wi'ag)
- Crocuta crocuta, spotted hyena, ዝብኢ (zibi)
- Caracal caracal, caracal, ጭክ ኣንበሳ (ch'ok anbessa)
- Panthera pardus, leopard, ነብሪ (nebri)
- Xerus rutilus, unstriped ground squirrel, ምጹጽላይ or ጨጨራ (mitsutsilay, chechera)
- Canis mesomelas, black-backed jackal, ቡኳርያ (bukharya)
- Canis anthus, golden jackal, ቡኳርያ (bukharya)
- Papio hamadryas, hamadryas baboon, ጋውና (gawina)
- Procavia capensis, rock hyrax, ጊሐ (gihè)
- Felis silvestris, African wildcat, ሓክሊ ድሙ (hakili dummu)
- Civettictis civetta, African civet, ዝባድ (zibad)
- Papio anubis, olive baboon, ህበይ (hibey)
- Ichneumia albicauda, white-tailed mongoose, ፂሒራ (tsihira)
- Herpestes ichneumon, large grey mongoose, ፂሒራ (tsihira)
- Hystrix cristata, crested porcupine, ቅንፈዝ (qinfiz)
- Oreotragus oreotragus; klipspringer, ሰስሓ (sesiha)
- Orycteropus afer, aardvark, ፍሒራ (fihira)
- Genetta genetta, common genet, ስልሕልሖት (silihlihot)
- Lepus capensis, cape hare, ማንቲለ (mantile)
- Mellivora capensis, honey badger, ትትጊ (titigi)

==== Small rodents ====
The most common pest rodents with widespread distribution in agricultural fields and storage areas are three Ethiopian endemic species: the Dembea grass rat (Arvicanthis dembeensis, sometimes considered a subspecies of Arvicanthis niloticus), Ethiopian white-footed rat (Stenocephalemys albipes), and Awash multimammate mouse (Mastomys awashensis).

==== Bats ====
Bats occur in natural caves, church buildings and abandoned homesteads. The large colony of bats that roosts in Zeyi cave comprises Hipposideros megalotis (Ethiopian large-eared roundleaf bat), Hipposideros tephrus, and Rhinolophus blasii (Blasius's horseshoe bat).

==== Birds ====
With its numerous exclosures, forest fragments and church forests, Tigray is a birdwatcher's paradise. Detailed inventories list at least 170 bird species, including numerous endemic species. Species belonging to the Afrotropical Highland Biome occur in the dry evergreen montane forests of the highland plateau but can also occupy other habitats. Wattled Ibis can be found feeding in wet grassland and open woodland. Black-winged Lovebird, Banded Barbet, Golden-mantled or Abyssinian Woodpecker, Montane White-eye, Rüppell's Robin-chat, Abyssinian Slaty Flycatcher and Tacazze Sunbird are found in evergreen forest, mountain woodlands and areas with scattered trees including fig trees, Euphorbia abyssinica and Juniperus procera. Erckel's spurfowl, Dusky Turtle Dove, Swainson's or Grey-headed Sparrow, Baglafecht Weaver, African Citril, Brown-rumped Seedeater and Streaky Seedeater are common Afrotropical breeding residents of woodland edges, scrubland and forest edges. White-billed Starling and Little Rock Thrush can be found on steep cliffs; Speckled or African rock pigeon and White-collared Pigeon in gorges and rocky places but also in towns and villages.

Species belonging to the Somali-Masai Biome. Hemprich's Hornbill and White-rumped Babbler are found in bushland, scrubland and dense secondary forest, often near cliffs, gorges or water. Chestnut-Winged or Somali Starling and Rüppell's Weaver are found in bushy and shrubby areas. Black-billed wood hoopoes have some red at the base of the bill or an entirely red bill in this area.

Species belonging to the Sudan-Guinea Savanna Biome: Green-backed eremomela and Chestnut-crowned Sparrow-Weaver.

Species that are neither endemic nor biome-restricted but that have restricted ranges or that can be more easily seen in Ethiopia than elsewhere in their range: Abyssinian Roller is an Ethiopian relative of Lilac-breasted Roller, which is an intra-tropical breeding migrant of south and east Africa, and of European Roller, an uncommon Palearctic passage migrant. Black-billed Barbet, Yellow-breasted Barbet and Grey-headed Batis are species from the Sahel and Northern Africa but also occur in Acacia woodlands in the area.

The most regularly observed raptor birds in crop fields in Tigray are Augur buzzard (Buteo augur), Common Buzzard (Buteo buteo), Steppe Eagle (Aquila nipalensis), Lanner falcon (Falco biarmicus), Black kite (Milvus migrans), Yellow-billed kite (Milvus aegyptius) and Barn owl (Tyto alba).

Birdwatching can be done particularly in exclosures and forests. Eighteen bird-watching sites have been inventoried in Enderta and Degua Tembien and mapped.

== Administrative zones and districts ==
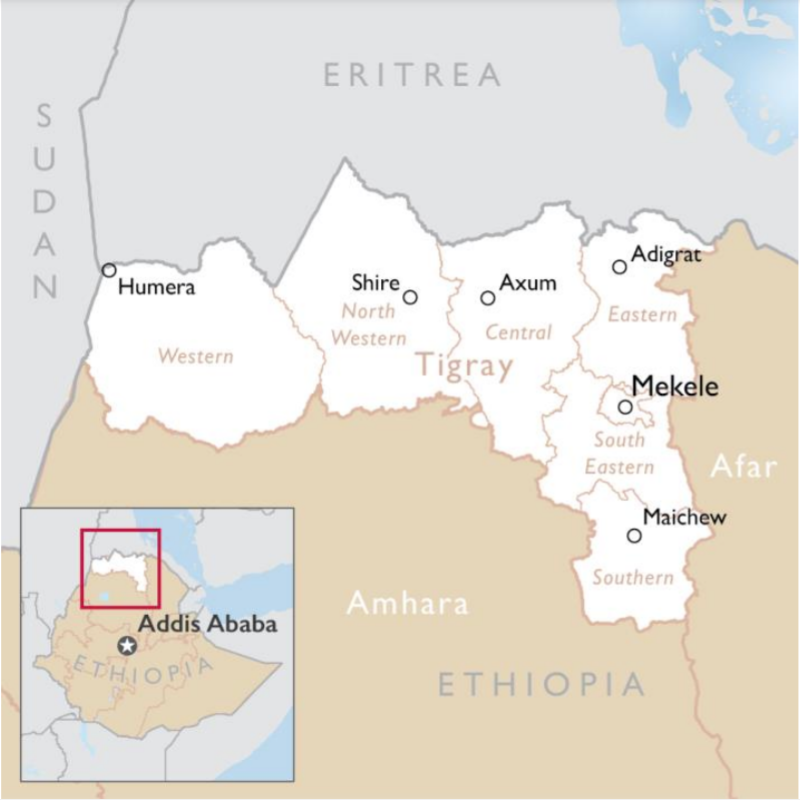
Administrative zones of Tigray

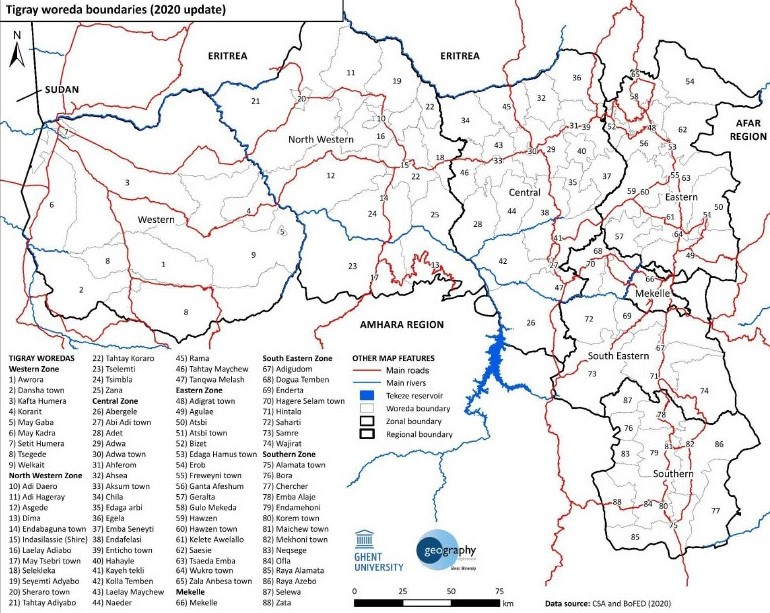
Districts of Tigray

Like other Regions in Ethiopia, Tigray is subdivided into administrative zones, and further into woredas or districts. Up to January 2020, these were the woredas of Tigray:

- Central Tigray
  - Abergele
  - Abiy Addi Town
  - Adwa
  - Adwa Town
  - Aksum Town
  - Dogu'a Tembien
  - Enticho
  - Kola Tembien
  - La'ilay Maychew
  - Mereb Lehe
  - Naeder Adet
  - Tahtay Maychew
  - Werie Lehe
- East Tigray
  - Adigrat Town
  - Atsbi Wenberta
  - Ganta Afeshum
  - Gulomahda
  - Hawzen
  - Irob
  - Kilte Awulaelo
  - Saesi Tsaedaemba
  - Wukro Town
- North West Tigray
  - Asigede Tsimbela
  - La'ilay Adiyabo
  - Medebay Zana
  - Tahtay Adiyabo
  - Tahtay Koraro
  - Tselemti
  - Shiraro Town
  - Shire Town
- South Tigray
  - Alaje
  - Alamata
  - Alamata Town
  - Endamehoni
  - Korem Town
  - Maychew Town
  - Ofla
  - Raya Azebo
- South East Tigray
  - Enderta
  - Hintalo Wajirat
  - Samre
- West Tigray
  - Kafta Humera
  - Humera Town
  - Wolqayt
  - Tsegede
- Mekelle (special zone)

In 2018 and 2019, after multiple village discussions that were often vigorous in the more remote areas, 21 independent urban administrations were added and other boundaries re-drawn, resulting in an increase from 35 to 94 woredas in January 2020:

- Central Tigray
  - Abergele
  - Adet
  - Abiy Addi Town
  - Adwa
  - Adwa Town
  - Ahferom
  - Ahse'a
  - Aksum Town
  - Chila
  - Edaga Arbi
  - Egela
  - Emba Seneyti
  - Mai Qnetal
  - Enticho town
  - Hahayle
  - Keyh Tekli
  - Kola Temben
  - Laelay Maychew
  - Naeder
  - Rama
  - Tahtay Maichew
  - Tanqua Melash
- East Tigray
  - Adigrat Town
  - Agulae
  - Tsirae Wenberta
  - Atsbi Dera
  - Atsbi Town
  - Bizet
  - Edaga Hamus Town
  - Erob
  - Freweyni Town
  - Ganta Afeshum
  - Gheralta
  - Hawzen
  - Hawzen Town
  - Kilte Awulaelo
  - Sebha Saesie
  - Tsaeda Emba
  - Wukro Town
  - Fatsi Town
  - Zalambessa Town
- North West Tigray
  - Adi Daero town
  - Maekel Adiyabo or Adi Hageray
  - Asgede
  - Laelay Tselemti
  - Inda Aba Guna Town
  - Shire Inda Selassie Town
  - Laelay Adiabo
  - May Tsebri Town
  - Selekleka
  - Seyemti Adiyabo
  - Sheraro Town
  - Tahtay Adiyabo
  - Tahtay Koraro
  - Tselemti
  - Tsimbla
  - Zana
- South Tigray
  - Alamata Town
  - Bora
  - Raya Chercher
  - Emba Alaje
  - Endamehoni
  - Korem Town
  - Maichew Town
  - Mekhoni Town
  - Neqsage
  - Ofla
  - Raya Alamata
  - Raya Azebo
  - Selewa
  - Zata
- South East Tigray
  - Adi Gudem town
  - Dogu'a Temben
  - Enderta
  - Hagere Selam Town
  - Hintalo
  - Eisra Adi Wajirat
  - Saharti
  - Samre
- West Tigray
  - Awura
  - Dansha town
  - Kafta Humera
  - Qorarit Town
  - May Kadra town
  - Mai Gaba town
  - Humera town
  - Tsegede
  - Welkalt
- Mekelle (special zone)
  - Hadnet Sub city
  - Hawelti Sub city
  - Adi Haqi Sub city
  - Quiha Sub city
  - Semien Sub city
  - Kedamay Weyane Sub city
  - Ayder Sub city

=== Major cities ===
Mekelle, home to Mekelle University, Mekelle Institute of Technology, Tigray Institute of Policy Studies, Admas University, Microlink College, Nile College, and Mekelle College of Teacher Education is the capital of Tigray, near the geographic center of the state.

Other Tigray cities functioning as centers of Ethiopian metropolitan areas include:

- Adigrat (home of Adigrat University, Debre Damo monastery and Addis Pharmaceutical Factory)
- Adwa (home of Adwa Pan African University,)
- Axum (home of Aksum University,)
- Maychew (home of Raya University)

Of the 10 largest cities in Tigray, Maychew has the highest elevation at 2479 meter above sea level. Plenty of smaller towns, like Atsbi and Edaga Hamus are located at even higher elevations. Of the large cities, Humera is located at the lowest altitude (585 m).

== Government and politics ==
=== Executive branch ===
==== 2010s ====
In the 2010s, the executive branch included a president, and a vice-president, who succeeds the president in the event of the president's removal from office, and performs any duties assigned by the president. The other elected constitutional offices in the executive branch are the Regional Health Bureau (Ato Hagos Godefy), Educational Bureau (Ato Gebre'egziabher), Auditor General (Ato Alemseged Kebedew), and 12 other officials.

==== 2020s ====
During the 2020s, executive control of Tigray Region changed several times in relation to leadup to the Tigray war, the war itself, and following events including the Ethiopia–Tigray peace agreement.

On 9 September 2020, Debretsion Gebremichael was elected president of Tigray Region in the 2020 Tigray regional election.

Debretsion de facto lost control of Tigray early during the Tigray war. The federally appointed Transitional Government of Tigray formally governed Tigray Region for over half a year, headed by Mulu Nega from around 13 November 2020 to 6 May 2021, and then by Abraham Belay until late June 2021.

Debretsion was de facto the head of Tigray Region again from 28 June 2021, following Operation Alula, to March 2023.

On 23 March 2023, following the November 2022 Ethiopia–Tigray peace agreement that established a ceasefire aiming to end the Tigray war, the federal government nominated Getachew Reda as head of an interim administration. In April 2025, Tadesse Werede, a military commander, took over the role of head of the administration.

From 5 May to 4 October 2026, Debretsion again held de facto control of the Tigray administration.

During the 2026 Ethiopian offensive, federal forces retook control of Mekelle. A second interim administration was established on 16 October 2026, for a declared intended duration of six months, with a rotating presidency, and a declared intention of enabling a new Tigray regional election to be held by the National Election Board of Ethiopia by April 2027.

=== Judicial branch ===
There are three levels of the Tigray state judiciary. The lowest level is the court of common pleas: each woreda maintains its own constitutionally mandated court of common pleas, which maintain jurisdiction over all justiciable matters. The intermediate-level court system is the district court system. Four courts of appeals exist, each retaining jurisdiction over appeals from common pleas, municipal, and county courts in an administrative zone. A case heard in this system is decided by a three-judge panel, and each judge is elected.

The highest-ranking court, the Tigray Supreme Court, is Tigray's "court of last resort". A seven-justice panel composes the court, which, by its own discretion, hears appeals from the courts of appeals, and retains original jurisdiction over limited matters. The chief judge is called the President of Tigray Supreme Court (W/ro Hirity Miheretab).

=== Legislative branch ===
The State Council, which is the highest administrative body of the state, is made up of 152 members.

=== National politics ===
Tigray is represented by 38 representatives in the Federal Democratic Republic of Ethiopia House of Peoples' Representatives. In mid 2020, after the postponement of the national election, which TPLF leaders viewed as illegitimate, Tigrayan representatives in the House of Peoples' Representatives resigned.

== Demographics ==
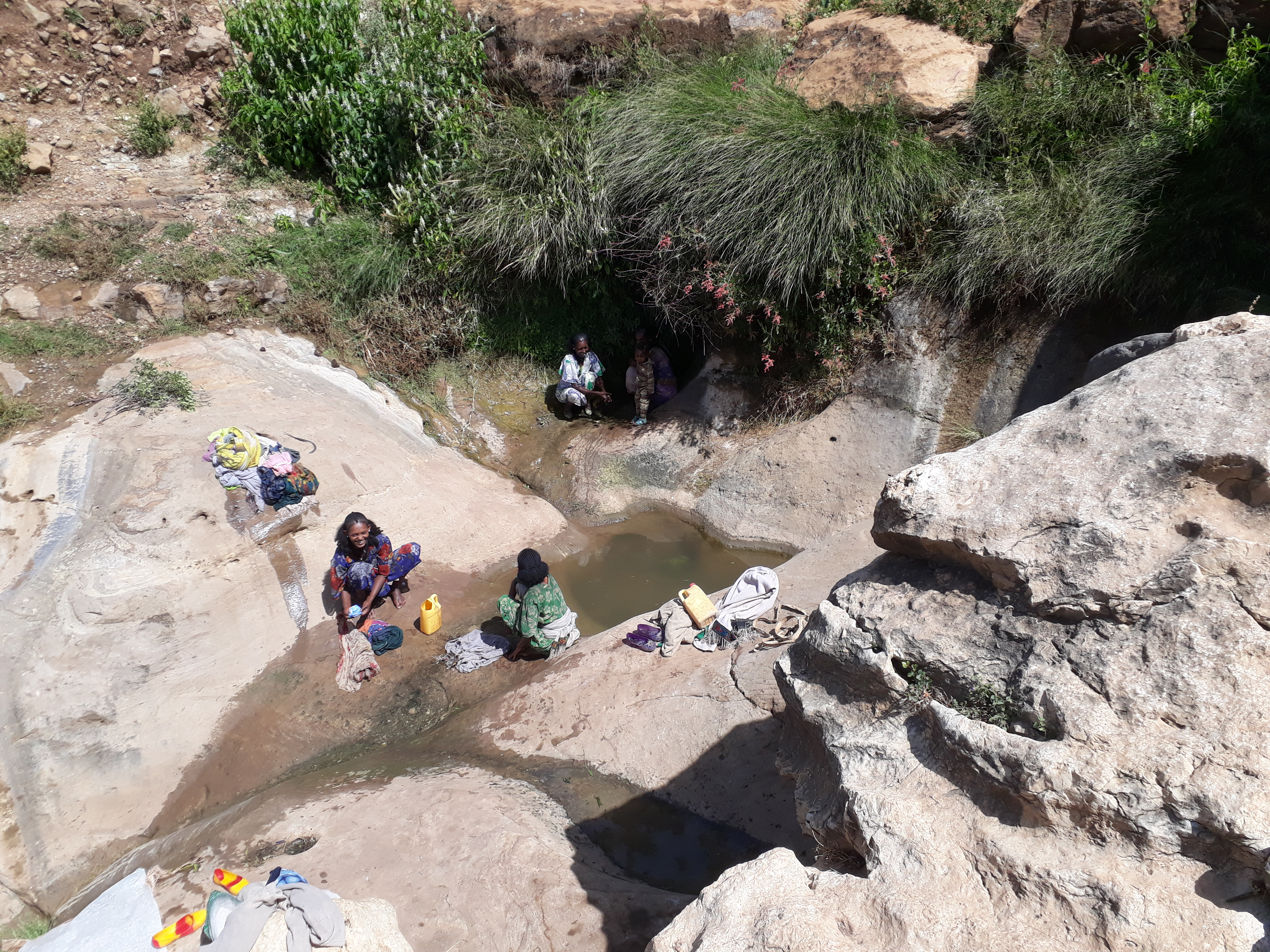
Tigrayan women washing clothes in Santarfa

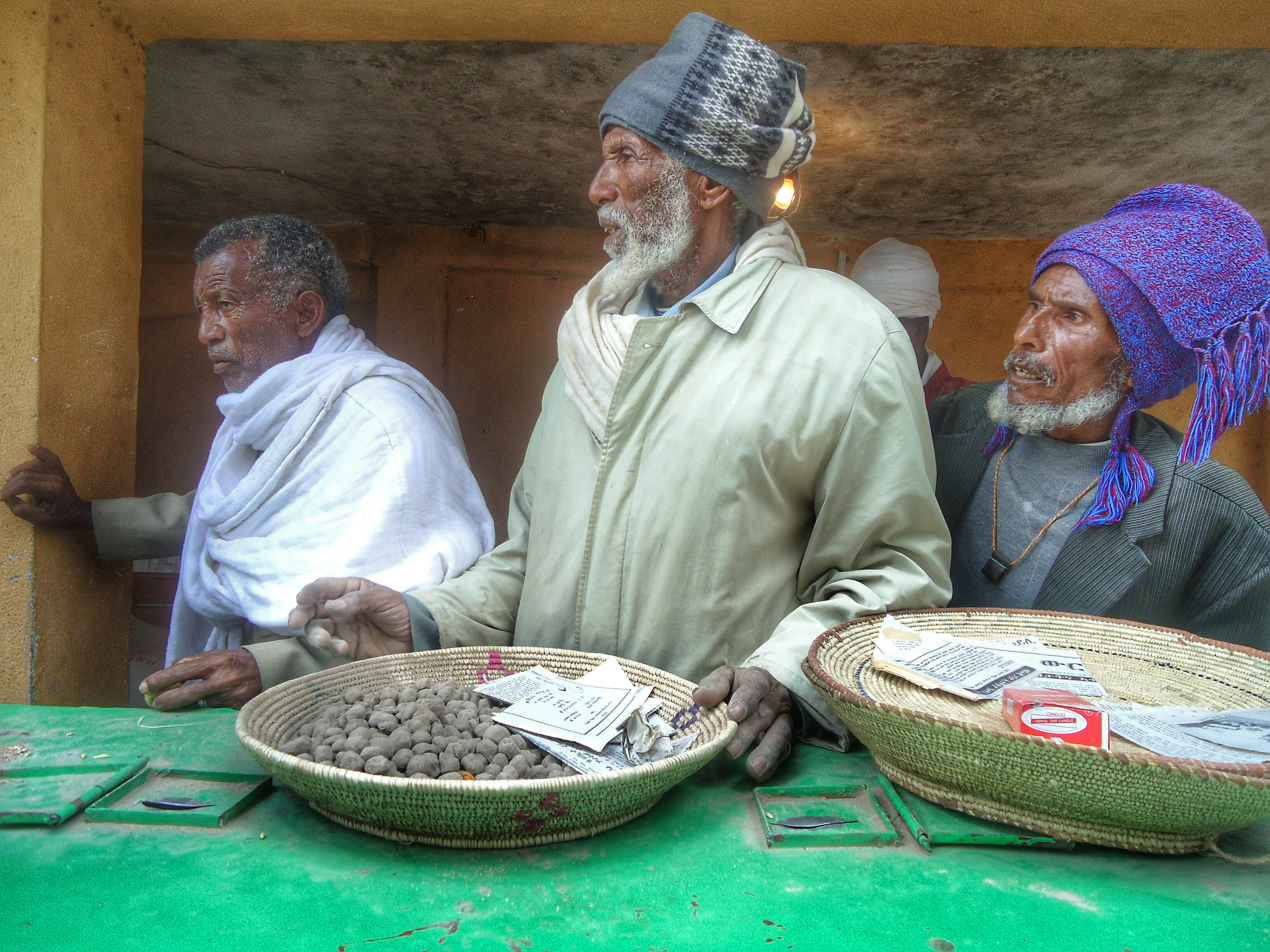
Church of Our Lady Mary of Zion in Axum

Based on the 2007 census conducted by the Central Statistical Agency of Ethiopia (CSA), the Tigray Region has a population of 4,316,988, of whom 2,126,465 are men and 2,190,523 women; urban inhabitants number 844,040 or 19.6% of the population. With an estimated area of 84,722 km^{2}, the region had an estimated density of 51 people per km^{2}. In the entire region 992,635 households were counted, for an average of 4.4 people per household, with urban households having on average 3.4 and rural households 4.6.

In the previous census, conducted in 1994, the region's population was 3,136,267, of whom 1,542,165 were men and 1,594,102 women; urban inhabitants numbered 621,210, or 14% of the population.

According to the CSA, as of 2004, 54.0% of the total population had access to safe drinking water, of whom 42.7% were rural inhabitants and 97.3% were urban. Values for other reported common indicators of the standard of living for Tigray as of 2005 include: 31.6% of the inhabitants fall into the lowest wealth quintile; adult literacy for men is 67.5% and for women 33.7%; and the infant mortality rate is 67 infant deaths per 1,000 live births, less than the national average of 77; at least half of these deaths occurred in the infants' first month of life.

The predominant religion in Tigray is Orthodox Christianity at 95.6%.

Religion	1994 Census	2007 Census
Orthodox Christians	96.5%	96.6%
Muslims	3.1%	3.0%
Catholics	0.4%	0.4%

Historical population
Year	Pop.	±%
1994	3,136,267	—
2007	4,316,988	+37.6%

=== Ethnicity ===
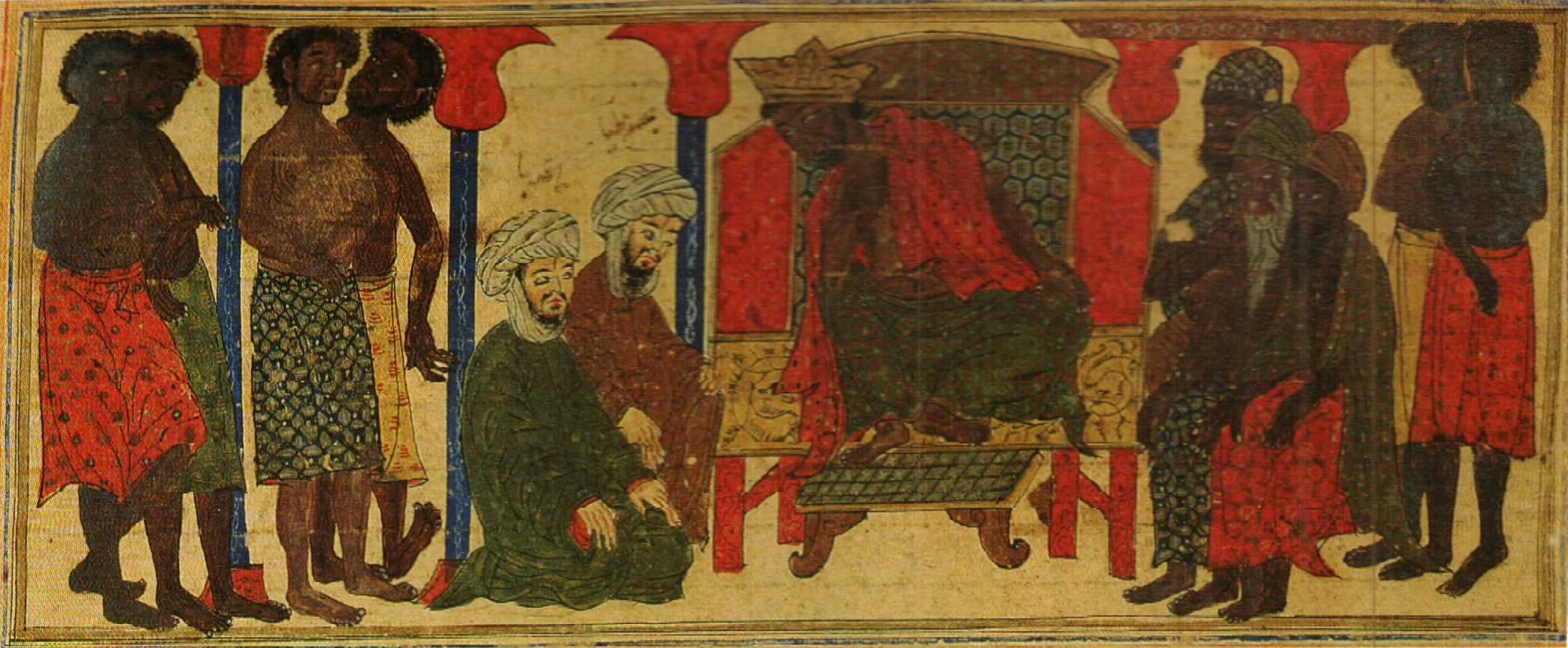
The king of Aksum refusing a request from pagan Meccans for Muslims Muhammad had sent there as refugees (1314 artwork).

With 96.6% of the local population, the region is predominantly inhabited by the Tigrinya-speaking Tigrayan people. The Tigrinya language belongs to the Semitic branch of the Afro-Asiatic family of languages. Most other residents hail from other Afro-Asiatic-speaking communities, including the Amhara, Irob, Afar, Agaw and Oromo. Partly assimilated Oromo live in remoter villages in Raya Azebo and Alamata (woreda), whereas there are Agaw in Abergele (woreda). There are also Nilo-Saharan-speaking Kunama as well.

Ethnic group	1994 Census	2007 Census
Tigrayan	95.0%	96.6%
Amhara	2.6%	1.6%
Irob	0.7%	0.7%
Afar	–	0.3%
Agaw	–	0.2%
Oromo	–	0.2%
Kunama	0.1%	0.1%

=== Languages ===
The working language is Tigrinya. Saho and Kunama are also spoken, and most people in urban areas are also able to speak Amharic.

=== Notable people ===
- Abay Tsehaye - Co-Founder of Tigray People's Liberation Front
- Abba Estifanos of Gwendagwende – Christian monk, itinerant preacher, and martyr known for his reformation movement and as an early dissident of the Ethiopian Orthodox Church
- Abune Mathias – "His Holiness Abune Mathias I, Sixth Patriarch and Catholicos of Ethiopia, Archbishop of Axum, and Ichege of the See of Saint Taklehaimanot."
- Abune Paulos – Former Patriarch of the Ethiopian Orthodox Tewahedo Church.
- Abune Samuel Of Waldeba – Founder of Waldeba Monastery
- Bashai Awalom Haregot – The first African-trained spy.
- Debretsion Gebremichael – Former President of Tigray (9 Jan 2018 – 3 March 2023) & current chairman of Tigray People's Liberation Front.
- Emperor Yohannes IV – Prince of Tigray (1868–1871) & Emperor of Ethiopia (r. 12 January 1872 – 10 March 1889).
- Ewostatewos – Prominent Tigrayan monk, religious reformer, and saint.
- Gebrehiwot Baykedagn – Doctor, economist, and intellectual.
- Gen. Tsadkan Gebretensae – Lieutenant general and member of the central command of the Tigray Defense Forces.
- Getachew Reda – Chief Administrator of the Interim Regional Administration of Tigray
- Gudaf Tsegay – Athlete, 5,000 and 10,000 world champion, current world record holder for 5,000 m.
- Hagos Gebrhiwet – Athlete and former World Junior Record holder in the 5,000 meters.
- Hayelom Araya – Former Major General of Tigray People's Liberation Front & Ethiopian People's Revolutionary Democratic Front.
- Kiros Alemayehu – Songwriter and singer, popularized Tigrigna songs. Popularized Tigrigna songs through his albums to the non Tigrinya speaking Ethiopians
- Le'ul Ras Mengesha Seyoum – Son of Le'ul Ras Mengesha Yohannes & Former Governor of Tigray (1960 – 12 October 1974).
- Le'ul Ras Seyoum Mengesha – Son of Ras Mengesha Yohannes & Former Prince of Tigray (1906–1936).
- Letesenbet Gidey – Athlete, 10,000 meters world champion, multiple medalist, and world record holder.
- Meles Zenawi – Former Prime Minister of Ethiopia (28 May 1991– 20 August 2012).
- Miruts Yifter – Olympic runner.
- Ras Alula Aba Nega – The first full African general.
- Ras Mengesha Yohannes – Son of Emperor Yohannes IV & Former Governor of Tigray (1872–1906).
- Ras Mikael Sehul – Former Ruler of Ethiopia & Governor of Tigray (1748 –1771) (1772–1784).
- Rophnan – Musician & DJ.
- Saint Yared – Axumite composer and priest (25 April 505 – 20 May 571 AD), inventor of the three basic modes of Ethiopian/Eritrean church music, namely Ge'ez, Ezl, and Araray
- Selam Tesfaye – Actress.
- Sebhat Gebre-Egziabher – Fiction writer and philosopher.
- Seyoum Mesfin – Co-founder of Tigray People's Liberation Front & Former Foreign Minister of Ethiopia (1991–2010).
- Siye Abraha – Former Rebel fighter & top official of Tigray People's Liberation Front & Ethiopian People's Revolutionary Democratic Front.
- Tedros Adhanom Ghebreyesus – Director-General, World Health Organization (WHO).
- Tewolde Berhan Gebre Egziabher – Scientist and brother of Sebhat Gebre-Egziabher.
- Tilahun Gizaw – Student leader of the Ethiopian Student Movement
- Zera Yacob – Philosopher from the 17th Century, best known for his treatise, Hatata ("The Inquiry").
- Zeresenay Alemseged – Anthropologist, known for discovering "Selam", the fossilized remains of a 3.3-million-year-old Australopithecus afarensis child.

== Agriculture ==
=== Cropping ===
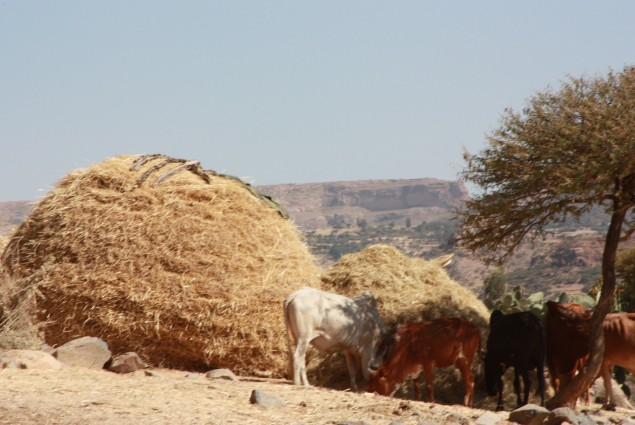
Heaped straw or kulsas

=== Terracing and dam construction ===
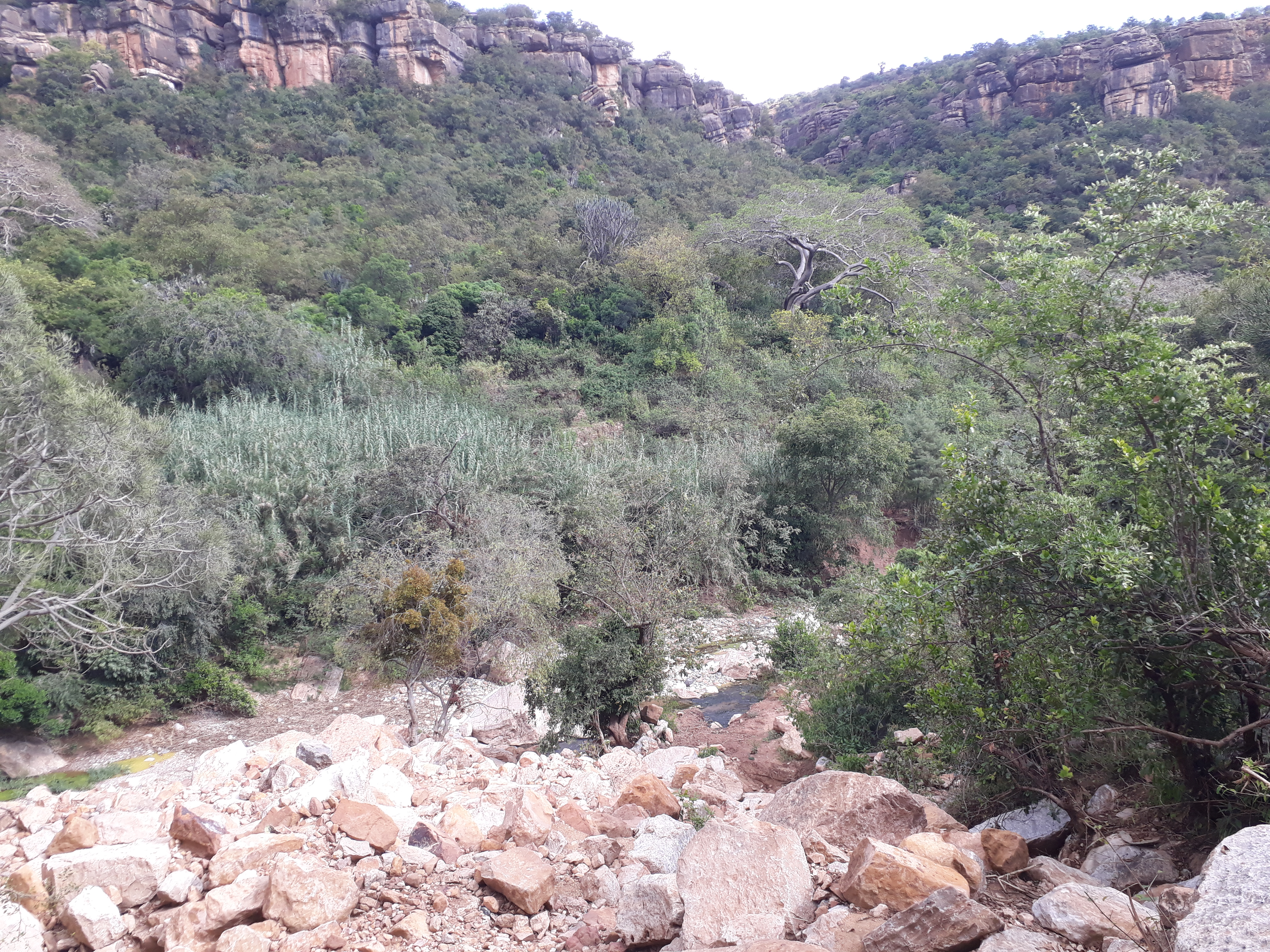
Gestet forest

An important aspect of the agricultural work in Tigray after the end of the 1991 civil war was to minimize the problems of drought. In the past, Tigray was covered with forests and had a micro-climate that favoured the rains. Subsequently, the forests were cut down, usually to impoverish the population during the wars. Consequently, Tigray achieved a fair amount of rainfall during the rainy season, from August to September, but quickly lost these waters downstream. In the process the fertile soil of the fields eroded. After a few weeks of rain, the country again dried up.

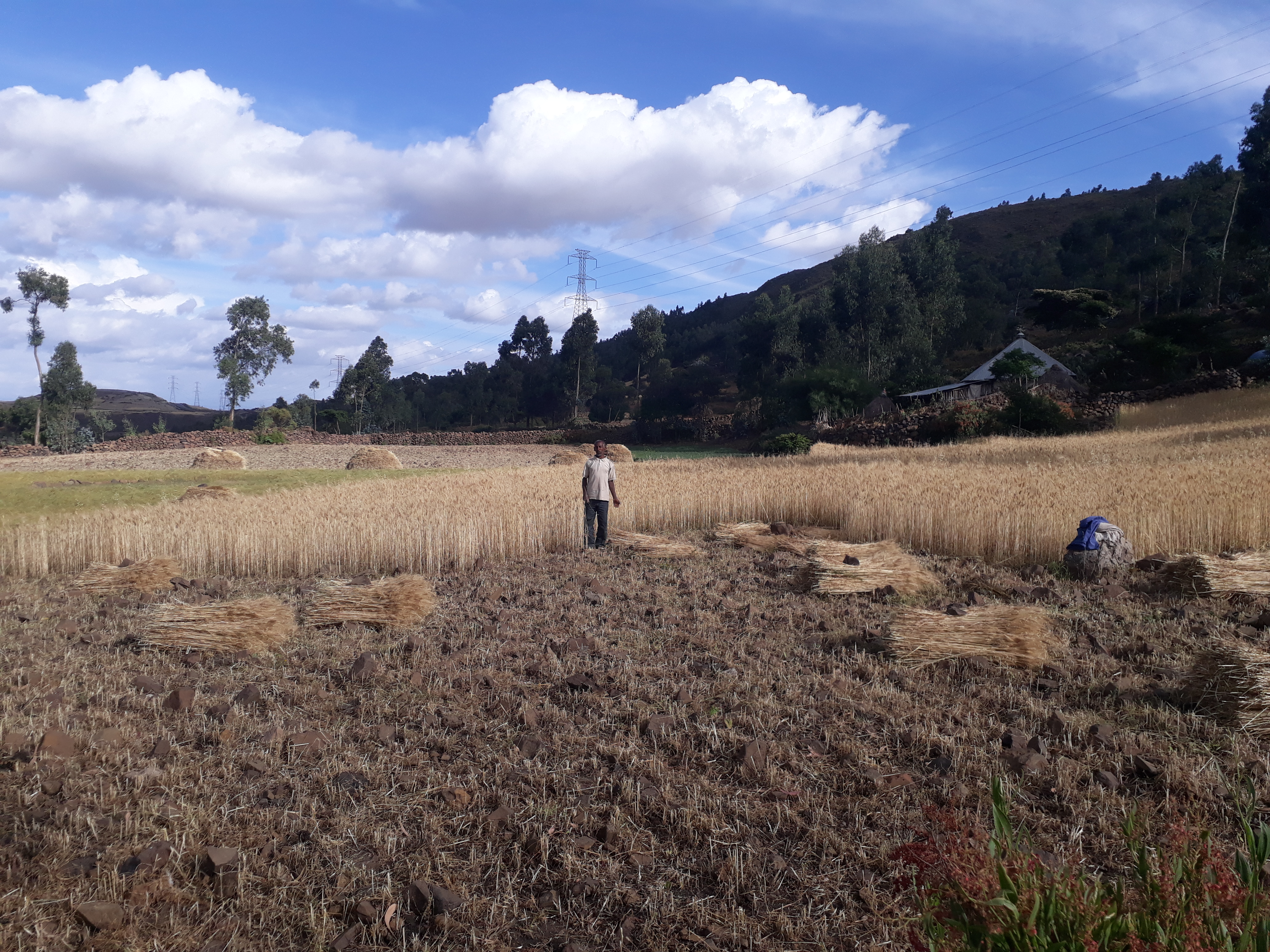
Crop harvesting in Khunale

The government undertook two projects in Tigray. The first was the construction of terraces which, with the agreement and help of local communities, go up to the tops of the mountains at 2,500 metres. The goal was to prevent the rainfall flowing away immediately so that it could be conserved for the agricultural season. On the highest terraces were planted trees, mainly eucalyptus, the dominant tree in Ethiopia and native to Australia. These plants created a new microclimate. The terracing method was very simple but required good organization. Long stretches of the fields were terraced by the villagers using stone walls from stones that erosion had exposed. The rains eroding the still non-terraced ground formed mudslides that were held by the topmost walls, which permitted construction of a new terrace field and another wall with uncovered stones, creating new ground terraced farmland every year.

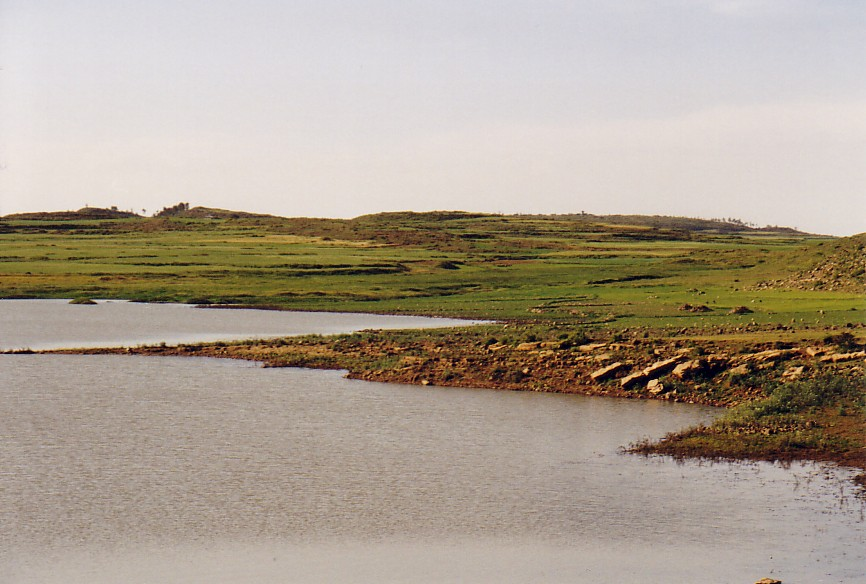
Addi Amharay reservoir

Another endeavour involved the construction of small reservoirs for local irrigation. As rains last only for a couple of months per year, reservoirs of different sizes allow harvesting runoff from the rainy season for further use in the dry season. The dams needed to create these basins are typically an embankment of a few hundreds of meters, closing off one part of a valley, with a maximum height of 20 metres. Each took months of work, in which people carried earth on their back, and with assistance of donkeys. Generally 2,000–3,000 people – men, women and children – carried the earth in simple baskets.

The small reservoirs in Tigray include:

- Addi Abagiè
- Addi Akhor
- Addi Amharay
- May Leiba
- Hiza'iti Wedi Cheber
- Addi Asme'e
- Chini
- Addi Gela
- Addi Hilo
- Addi Qenafiz
- Addi Shihu
- Aqushela
- Arato
- Belesat
- Betqua
- Chichat
- Dibdibo
- Dur Anbesa
- Imbagedo
- Inda Zib'i
- Era (reservoir)
- Era Quhila
- Gereb Mihiz
- Filiglig
- Gereb May Zib'i
- Gereb Bi'ati
- Gereb Awso
- Felaga
- Gereb Segen (Hintalo)
- Gereb Segen (May Gabat)
- Gereb Shegal
- Ginda'i
- Godew

Overall, these reservoirs suffer from rapid siltation. Part of the water that could be used for irrigation is lost through seepage; the positive side-effect is that this contributes to groundwater recharge.

=== Vegetation and enclosures ===
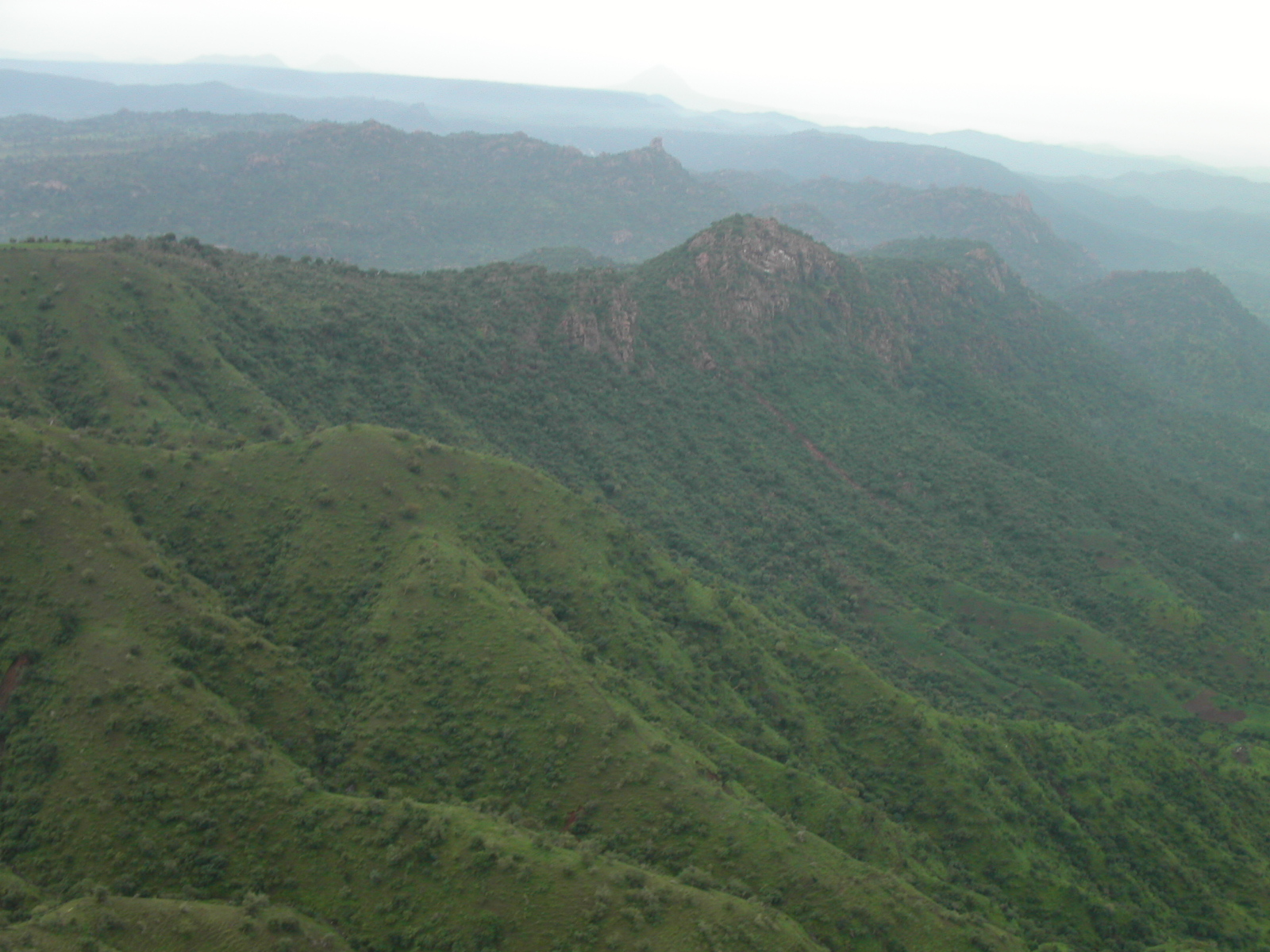
Mountains of Lemalimo near Inda Selassie in western Tigray

Tigray holds numerous exclosures, areas that are set aside for regreening. Logging and livestock grazing are not allowed there. Besides effects on biodiversity, water infiltration, protection from flooding, sediment deposition, carbon sequestration, people commonly have economic benefits from these exclosures through grass harvesting, beekeeping and other non-timber forest products. The local inhabitants also consider it as "land set aside for future generations". In Dogu'a Tembien, several exclosures are managed by the EthioTrees project. They have as an additional benefit that the villagers receive carbon credits for the sequestered CO_{2}, as part of a carbon offset programme. The revenues are then reinvested in the villages, according to the priorities of the communities; it may be for an additional class in the village school, a water pond, conservation in the exclosures, or a store for incense.

=== Livestock ===
Raya oxen at ploughing near Mekelle

The CSA estimated in 2005 that farmers in Tigray had a total of 2,713,750 cattle (representing 7.0% of Ethiopia's total cattle), 72,640 sheep (0.4%), 208,970 goats (1.6%), 1,200 horses (less than 0.1%), 9,190 mules (6.2%), 386,600 asses (15.4%), 32,650 camels (7.2%), 3,180,240 poultry of all species (10.3%), and 20,480 beehives (0.5%). Cattle are an essential component in the dominant grain-plough agricultural system. In the rainy season, a large part of the cattle herds are in transhumance.

Mainly used for draught, there are several cattle landraces in Tigray:

- Arado cattle, the dominant variety
- Raya cattle, long horned, especially raised in Southern Tigray and traded widely as plough oxen
- Irob cattle, particularly in the Irob woreda
- Abergele cattle, particularly in Abergele (woreda) and on the southwestern slopes of Dogu'a Tembien
- Begayt cattle, in western Tigray. They are known for better milk production
- In small towns: Cross-bred Arado x Begayt, and Arado x Holstein-Friesian milk cows

== Landmarks ==
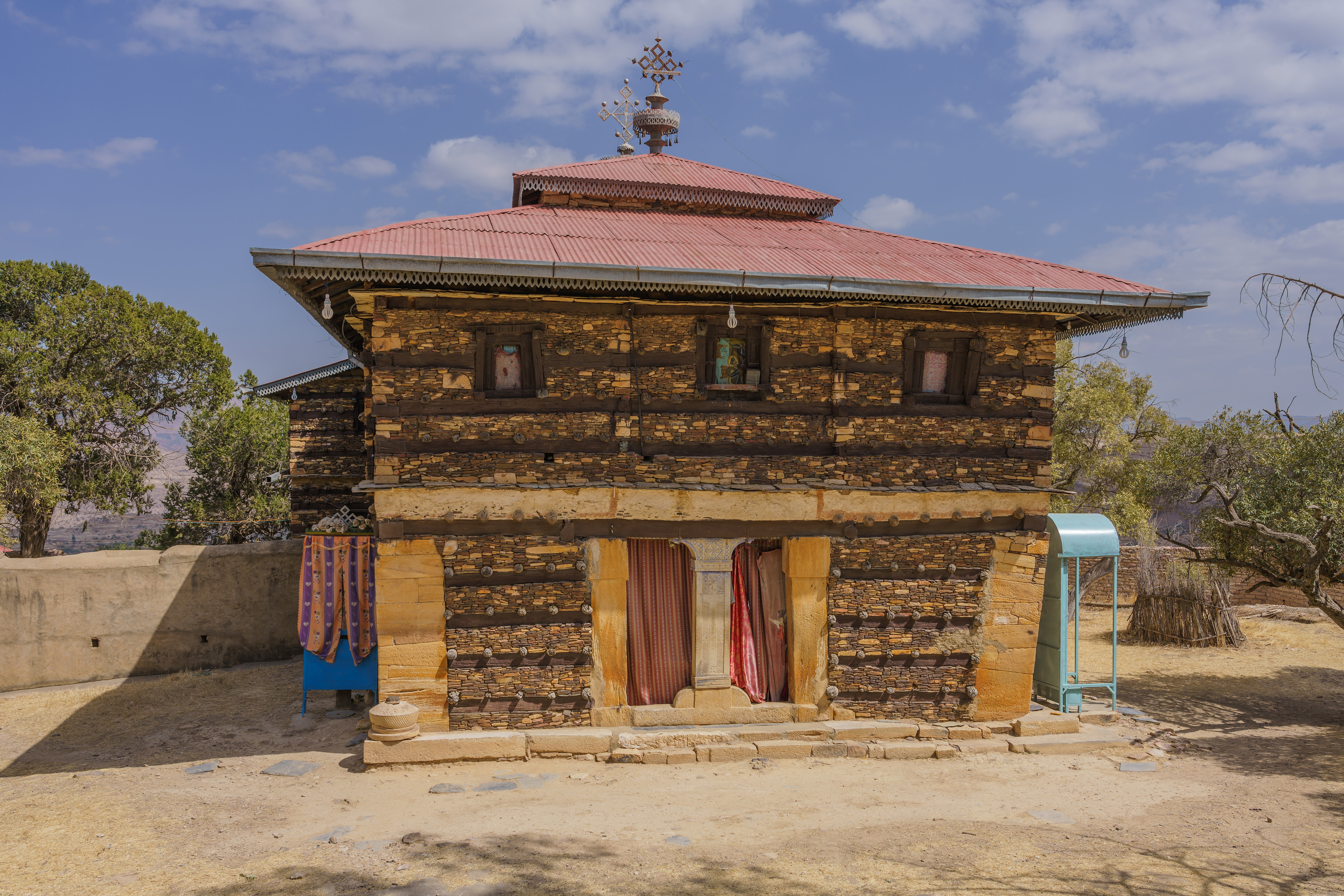
Debre Damo monastery.

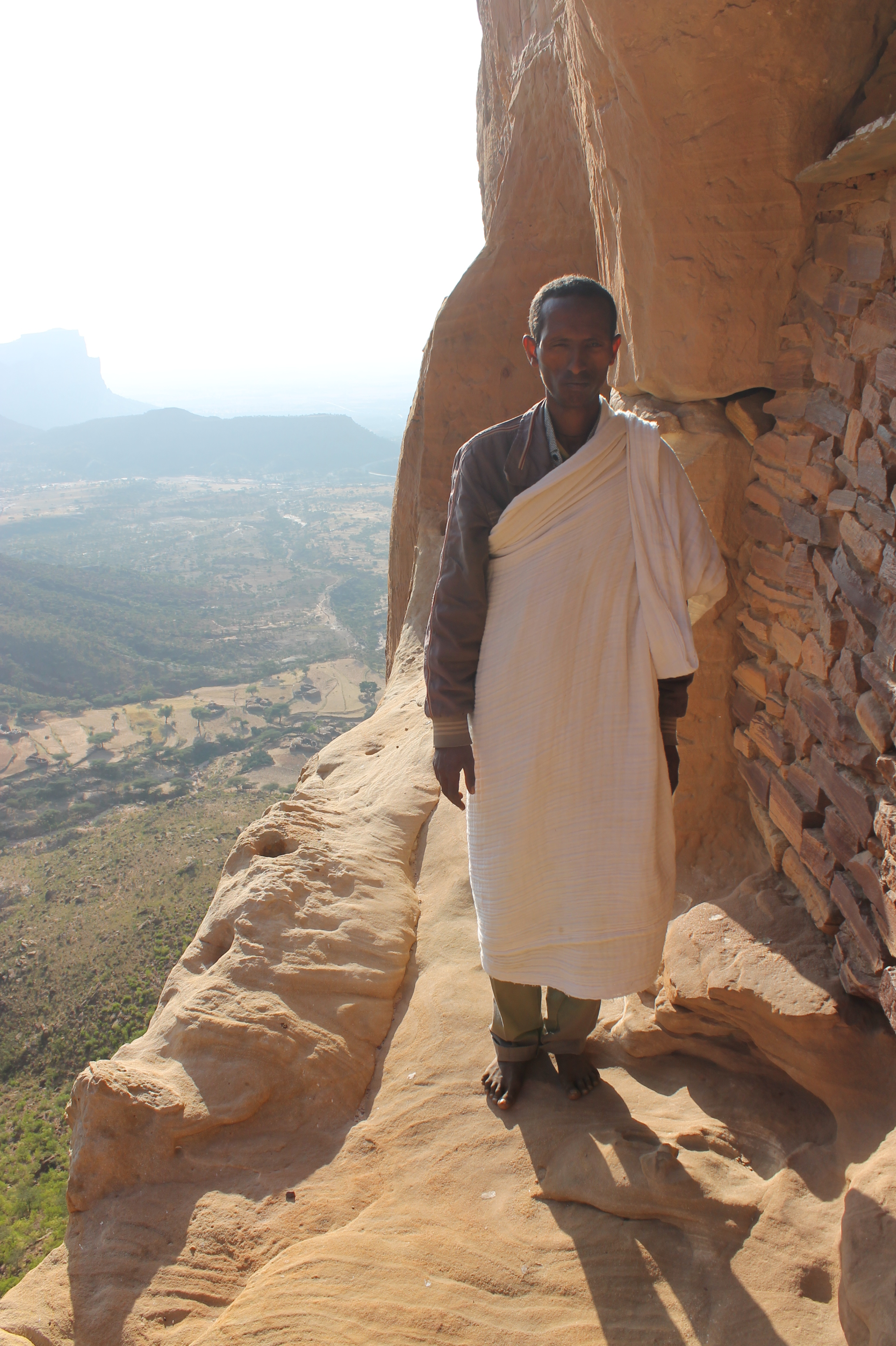
Monk standing in front of the rock-hewn Abuna Yemata Guh's entrance, situated at a height of 2,580 metres (8,460 ft) that has to be climbed on foot to reach.

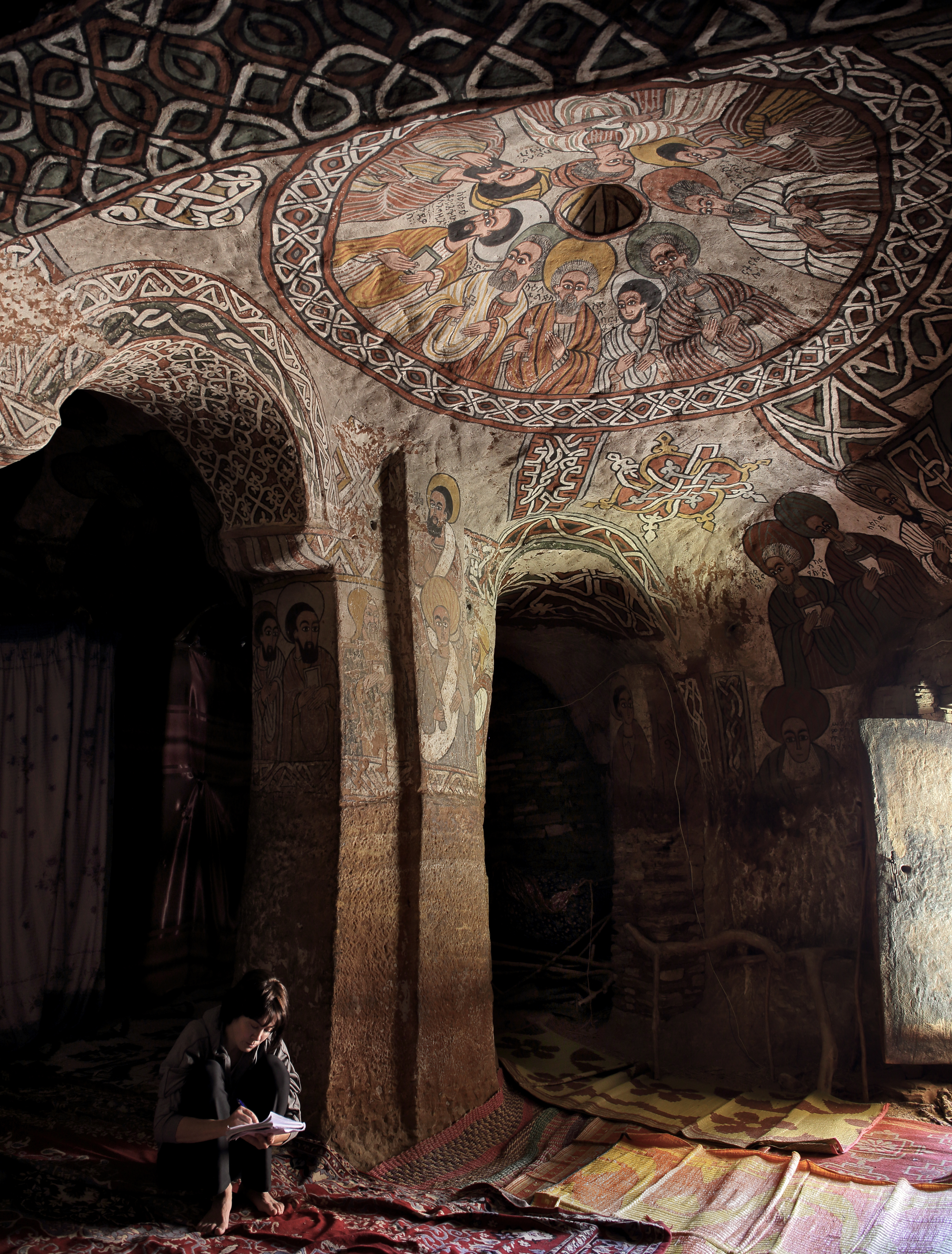
Rock hewn Church interior at Abuna Yemata Guh

A distinctive feature of Tigray are its rock-hewn churches. Similar in design to those of Lalibela in the Amhara Region, these churches are found in four or five clusters – Gheralta, Teka-Tesfay, Atsbi and Tembien – with Wukro sometimes included. Some of the churches are considered earlier than those of Lalibela, perhaps dating from the eighth century. Mostly monolithic, with designs partly inspired by classical architecture, they are often located at the top of cliffs or steep hills, for security. For example, Tigray's ancient Debre Damo monastery is accessible only by climbing a rope 25 metres up a sheer cliff.

Looting has become a major issue in the Tigray Region, as archaeological sites have become sources for construction materials and ancient artifacts used for everyday purposes by local populations.

The area is famous for a single rock sculptured 23 meter long obelisk in Axum as well as for other fallen obelisks. The Axum treasure site of ancient Tigrayan history is a major landmark. Yeha is another important local landmark that is little-known outside the region.

== Transport ==
=== Ground travel ===
A major north–south road corridor goes through Tigray. This is facilitated by Highway 2 which goes from Adigrat to Addis Ababa and Highway 3 which goes from Shire to Addis Ababa.

=== Air travel ===
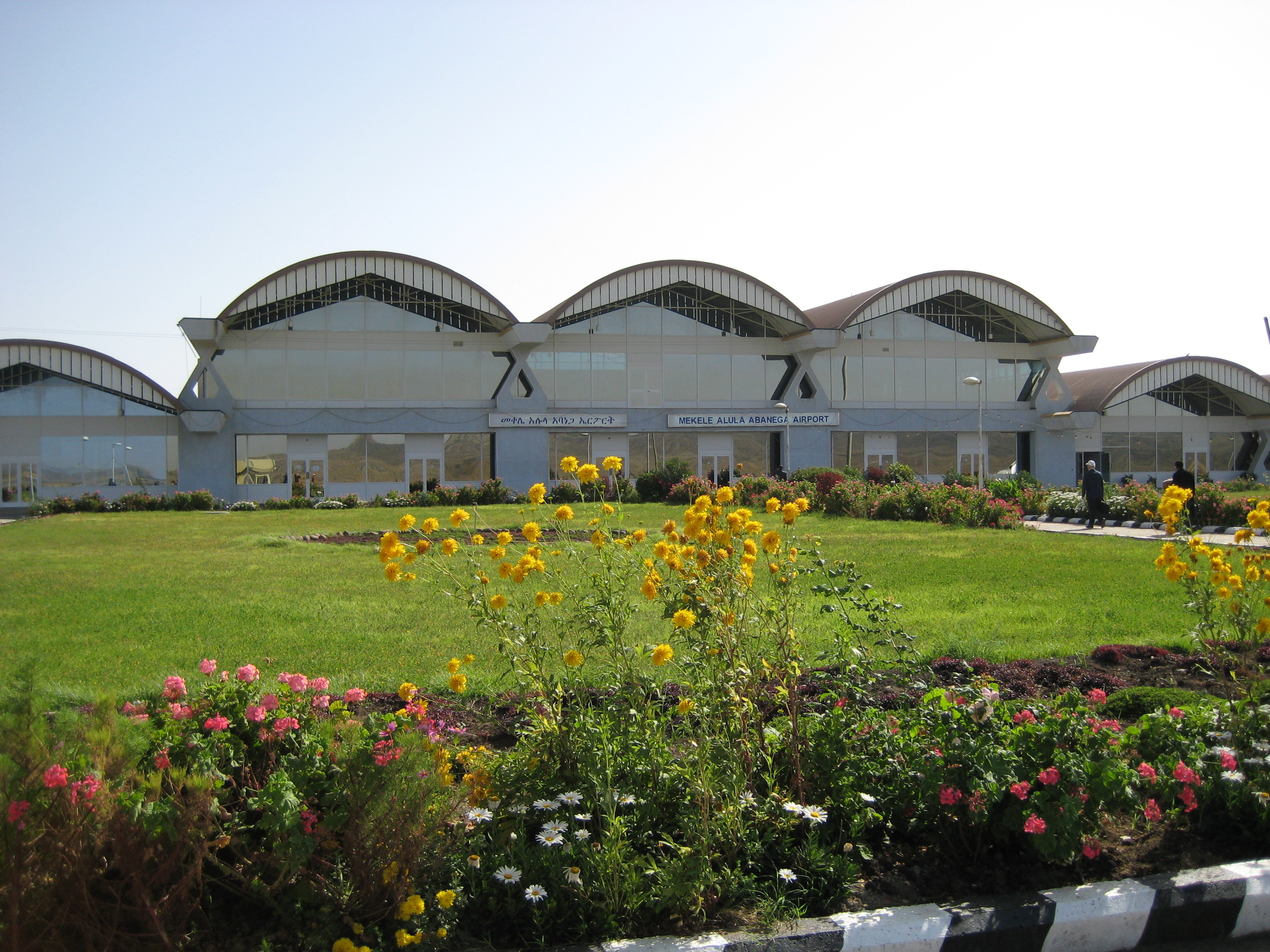
Alula Aba Nega Airport near to Mekelle.

Tigray has one international airport and four commercial airports. The international airport is Alula Aba Nega Airport (MQX) near Mekelle. The region's four other commercial airports are Shire Airport (SHC), Humera Airport (HUE), Dansha Airport, and Emperor Yohannes IV Airport (AXU), which serves Axum.

== Sports ==
Mekelle 70 Enderta F.C. (Tigrinya: ጋንታ መቐለ 70 እንደርታ) is an Ethiopian football club based in the capital, Mekelle. They are a member of the Ethiopian Football Federation and currently play in the top division of Ethiopian football, the Ethiopian Premier League. They are known by the nickname the Lion's Den (ምዓም ኣንበሳ /ምዓም አናብስት/ኣናብስቶቹ). The club won its first Ethiopian Premier League title in the 2018–2019 Ethiopian Premier League Season.

Shire Indasillasie F.C. (Tigrinya: ጋንታ ስሑል ሽረ, also known as Sihul Shire FC) is an Ethiopian football club based in Shire. They are a member of the Ethiopian Football Federation and play in the Ethiopian Premier League, the first division of football in Ethiopia.

Welwalo Adigrat University F.C (Tigrinya: ወልዋሎ ዓዲግራት ዩኒቨርስቲ ፍ.ሲ) is an Ethiopian football club based in Adigrat. They play in the Ethiopian Premier League, the top division of Ethiopian football

Mekele City, Suhul Shire, and Adigrat University football clubs were Tigray-based clubs among the 14 clubs to participate in the Ethiopian Premier League in 2020/2021. However, due to the war, they were replaced by other clubs from the League one rank below the Ethiopian Premier League.

Tigrayans are known for their good performance in road cycling. For many years cyclists from this region have been dominant in the Ethiopian national cycling championships. Tsgabu Grmay is one of the best Ethiopian cyclists and the first Ethiopian to participate in the Tour de France.

== Education ==
At the regional level, the Tigray Education Bureau governs primary and secondary educational institutions. At the municipal level, there are approximately 300 school districts region-wide.

=== Colleges and universities ===
- Adigrat University
- Axum University
- Adwa Pan-African University
- Raya University
- Ethio-lmage College
- Greenwich College
- Hashenge College
- Mars Engineering College
- Mekelle University
- Mekelle Institute of Technology
- New Millennium College
- Nile College
- Sheba University College
- Signal College
- St. Mary's University College
- Winner college Axum

=== Libraries ===
Tigray is home to Ethiopia's most extensive church libraries that are found in the eastern and central zones of the region. There are several ongoing digitization projects to preserve previous historical texts.

- Axum Heritage Foundation
- Romanat Qeddus Mika'el Church
- Gunda Gunde Monastery
- Agwaza Monastery
- Debre Damo Monastery

== Non-governmental organisations ==
Major NGOs, involved in development activities are:

- Relief Society of Tigray
- Tigrai Development Association
- Tegaru Disaster Relief Fund (TDRF)
