= Mekelle Institute of Technology =

University in Mekelle, Tigray Region, Ethiopia

- Type: Public
- Established: September 2002
- Location: Mekelle, Tigray Region, Ethiopia
- Campus: Urban
- Website: www.mu.edu.et

Mekelle Institute of Technology (MIT) is an educational institute created in Mekelle, the capital of the Tigray Region of Ethiopia, in 2002, aiming to teach and do research in engineering, science and technology. In 2020, MIT aimed to integrate with Mekelle University.

== History ==
MIT states that it was created in 2002.

MIT graduated its first batch of 142 students on 7 July 2007. In 2007, 560 students studied in the MIT Faculty of Engineering.

Inception

Mekelle Institute of Technology, MIT, was established and inspired by the following 4 pillars according to Ato Desta Asgedom one of the founders of MIT and Tigray Development Association (TDA).

1- First and for most, the 17 years of bitter armed struggle which is characterized by extreme endurance, tenacity, and determination of our people for equality and justice is the major source of inspiration not only for us but also for every Tigrean in all walks of life and will remain to be for generations to come.

2- Experience and achievements in the development endeavors undertaken by Tigrai Development Association that has given us the opportunity to learn the anatomy of poverty, its depth and severity that were in.

3- Experiences and achievements of other countries that were in the same situation as Tigray but which succeeded in becoming among the most industrialized nations and some to join middle-income economies in a matter of 40-50 years time.

4- The emergence of globalization and its attendants of rapid scientific and technological changes, fierce market competition that pose tremendous challenges also call for the urgency in human resource development as the theory of globalization is driven by a knowledge-based economy.

The main inspiration is from the believe that science and technology not only is relevant for poverty reduction, but it eradicates poverty altogether. In the paper presented at the International Conference at Mekelle Institute of Technology in October 22, 2011GC, Ato Desta Asgedom also stated that the start -up budget was donated from REST (one million birr) and from TDA (half a million birr and vehicles) and seven hundred thousand birr from fund raising. With this budget, MIT was launched and commenced its activities in November 2002. The building was secured from Tigray government at the building meant for "Management Institute" because the original plan to build the institute adjacent to Kalamino high school was interrupted by the Ethio-Eritrean war.

== Funding ==
EFFORT was the main funding body of Mekelle Institute of Technology. MIT also gets funds from research and development branch of its ICT department. This branch takes software and hardware projects and develops them for customers and gets some fund in return.

== Leadership and structure ==
MIT has also been able to create linkages with universities and colleges in the United States, which have provided manpower and material support to MIT. The institute is governed by a provisional governing board.

== See also ==
- List of universities and colleges in Ethiopia
- Education in Ethiopia

== Links and references ==
=== External links ===
- Official website
