= Soil in Inderta =

The soils of the Inderta woreda (district) in Tigray (Ethiopia) reflect its longstanding agricultural history, highly seasonal rainfall regime, relatively low temperatures, overall dominance of limestone and dolerite lithologies and steep slopes. Outstanding features in the soilscape are wide plains with Vertisols.

== Factors contributing to soil diversity ==
=== Climate ===
Annual rainfall depth is very variable with an average of around 600 mm. Most rains fall during the main rainy season, which typically extends from June to September. Mean temperature in woreda town Kwiha is 20 °C, oscillating between average daily minimum of 11.3 °C and maximum of 28.4 °C. The contrasts between day and night air temperatures are much larger than seasonal contrasts.

=== Geology ===
From the higher to the lower locations, the following geological formations are present:

- Amba Aradam Formation
- Agula Shale
- Mekelle Dolerite
- Antalo Limestone
- Quaternary alluvium and freshwater tufa

=== Topography ===
As part of the Ethiopian Highlands the land has undergone a rapid tectonic uplift, leading the occurrence of mountain peaks, plateaus, valleys and gorges.

=== Land use ===
Generally speaking the level lands and intermediate slopes are occupied by cropland, while there is rangeland and shrubs on the steeper slopes. Remnant forests occur around Orthodox Christian churches and a few inaccessible places. A recent trend is the widespread planting of eucalyptus trees.

=== Environmental changes ===
Soil degradation in this district became important when humans started deforestation almost 5000 years ago. Depending on land use history, locations have been exposed in varying degrees to such land degradation.

== Geomorphic regions and soil units ==
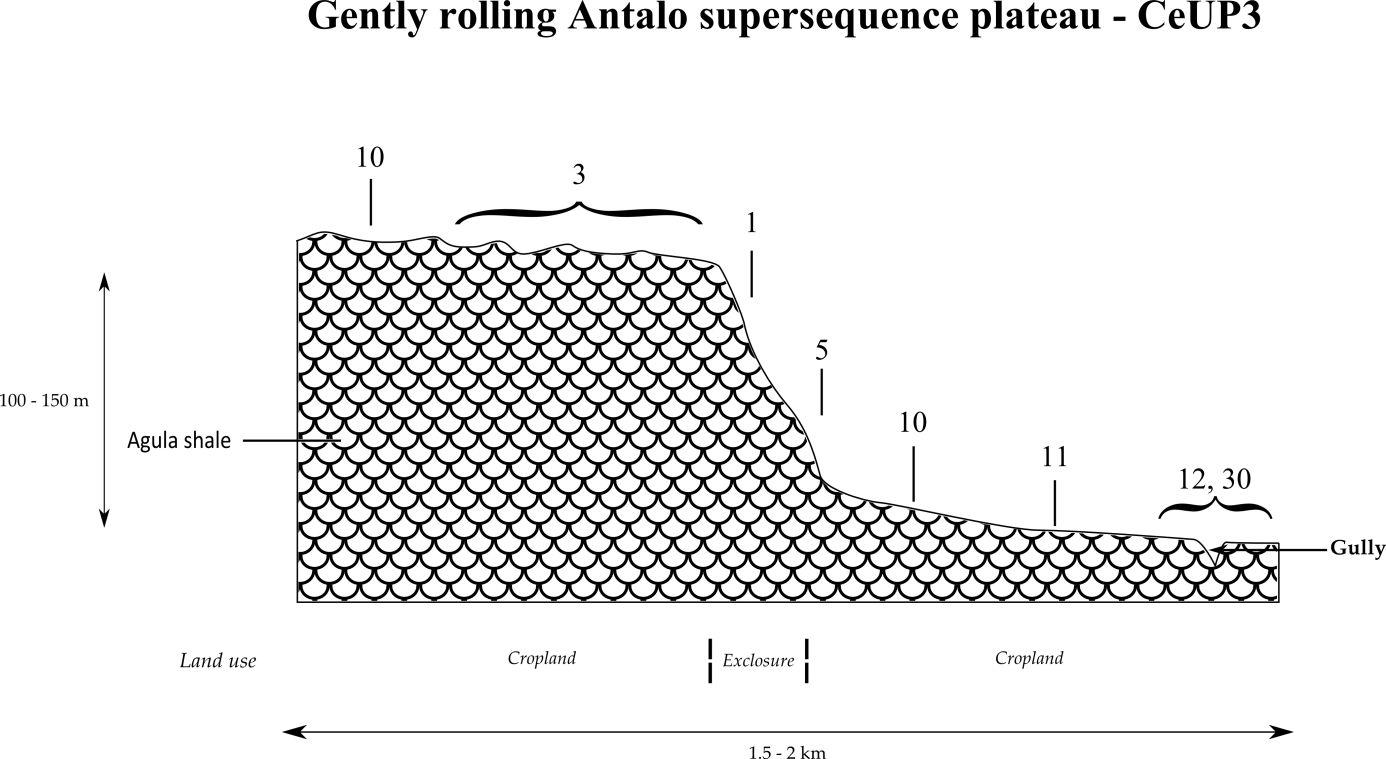
Typical catena in the gently rolling Antalo limestone plateau

Given the complex geology and topography of the district, it has been organised into land systems - areas with specific and unique geomorphic and geological characteristics, characterised by a particular soil distribution along the soil catena. Soil types are classified in line with World Reference Base for Soil Resources and reference made to main characteristics that can be observed in the field.

=== Gently rolling Antalo Limestone plateau, holding cliffs and valley bottoms ===
- Associated soil types
  - shallow stony soils with a dark surface horizon overlying calcaric material (Calcaric Leptosol) (3)
  - moderately deep dark stony clays with good natural fertility (Vertic Cambisol) (10)
  - deep, dark cracking clays on calcaric material (Calcaric Vertisol, Calcic Vertisol) (11)
- Inclusions
  - Rock outcrops and very shallow soils (Lithic Leptosol) (1)
  - Shallow very stony loamy soil on limestone (Skeletic Calcaric Cambisol) (5)
  - Deep dark cracking clays with very good natural fertility, waterlogged during the wet season (Chromic Vertisol, Pellic Vertisol) (12)
  - Brown to dark sands and silt loams on alluvium (Vertic Fluvisol, Eutric Fluvisol, Haplic Fluvisol) (30)

=== Gently undulating Agula shale plateau with dolerite ===
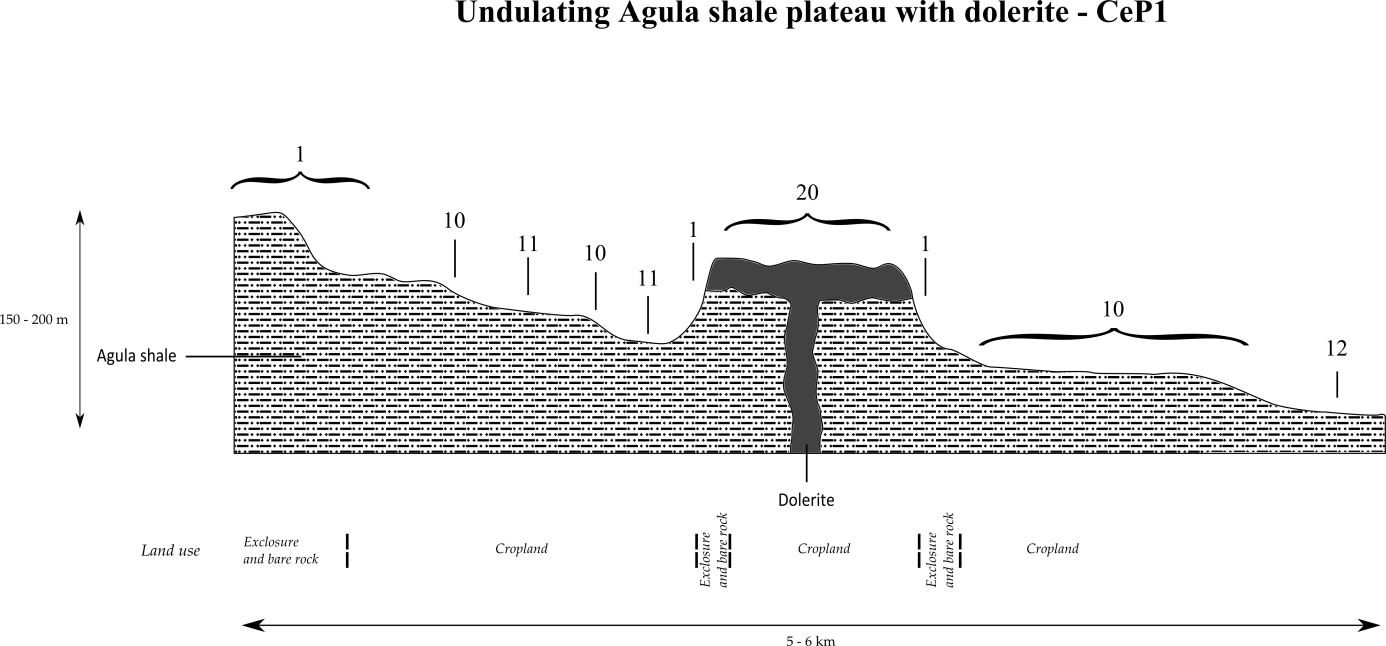
Typical catena on the undulating Agula shale plateau with dolerite

- Dominant soil type: stony, dark cracking clays with good natural fertility (Vertic Cambisol) (10)
- Associated soil types
  - rock outcrops, stony and shallow soils (Lithic Leptosol) (1)
  - red-brownish loamy soils with good natural fertility (Chromic Luvisol) (20)
- Inclusions
  - deep, dark cracking clays on calcaric material with good fertility but poor drainage (Vertisol) (11,12)

=== Mekelle Graben ===
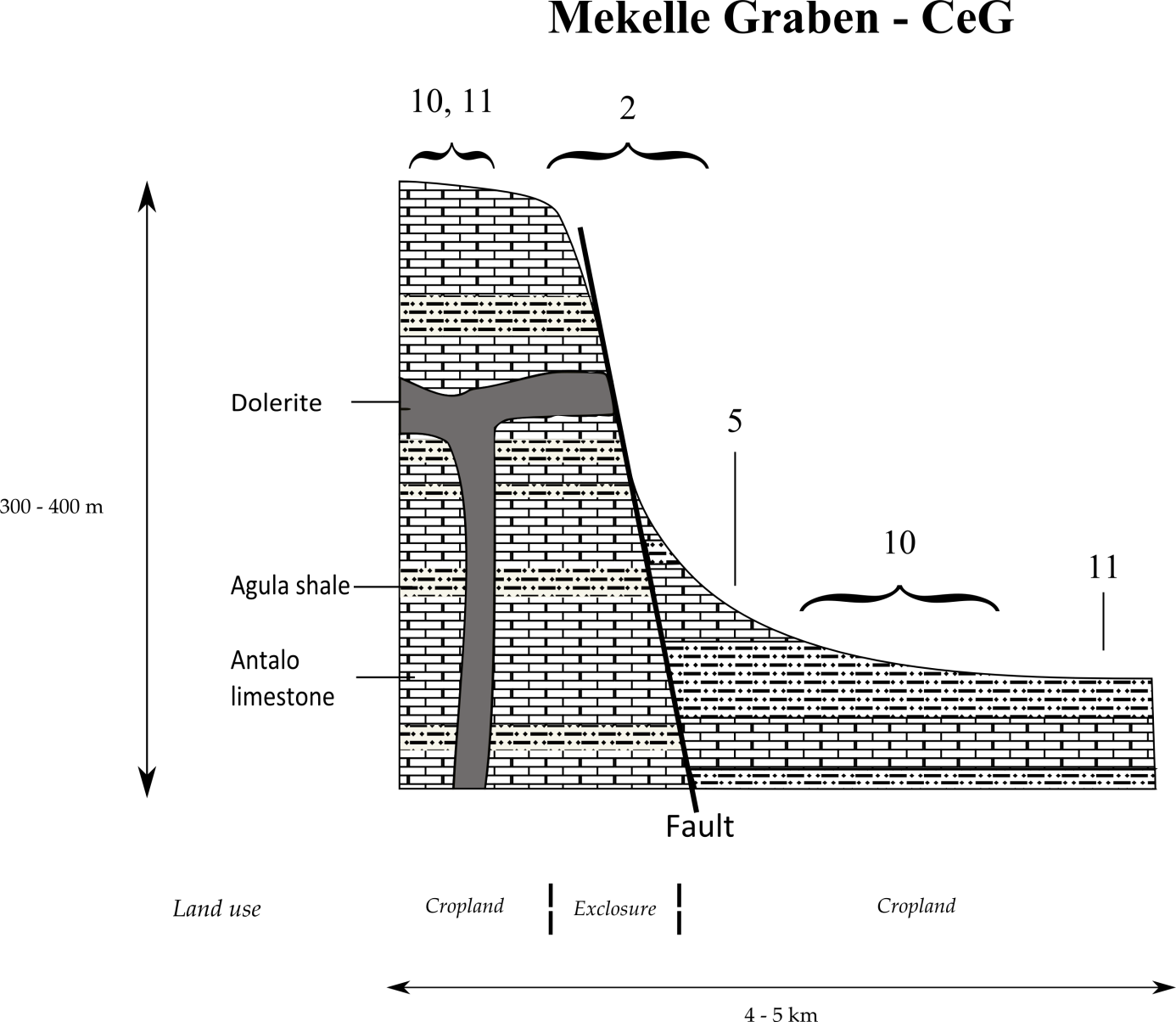
Typical catena along the Mekelle Fault escarpment

- Associated soil types
  - moderately deep dark stony clays with good natural fertility (Vertic Cambisol) (10)
  - deep, dark cracking clays on calcaric material (Calcaric Vertisol, Calcic Vertisol) (11)
  - moderately deep, red-brownish, loamy soils with a good natural fertility (Chromic Luvisol) (20)
- Inclusions
  - Rock outcrops and very shallow soils on limestone (Calcaric Leptosol) (2)
  - Shallow very stony loamy soil on limestone (Skeletic Calcaric Cambisol) (5)

=== Strongly incised Giba gorge ===
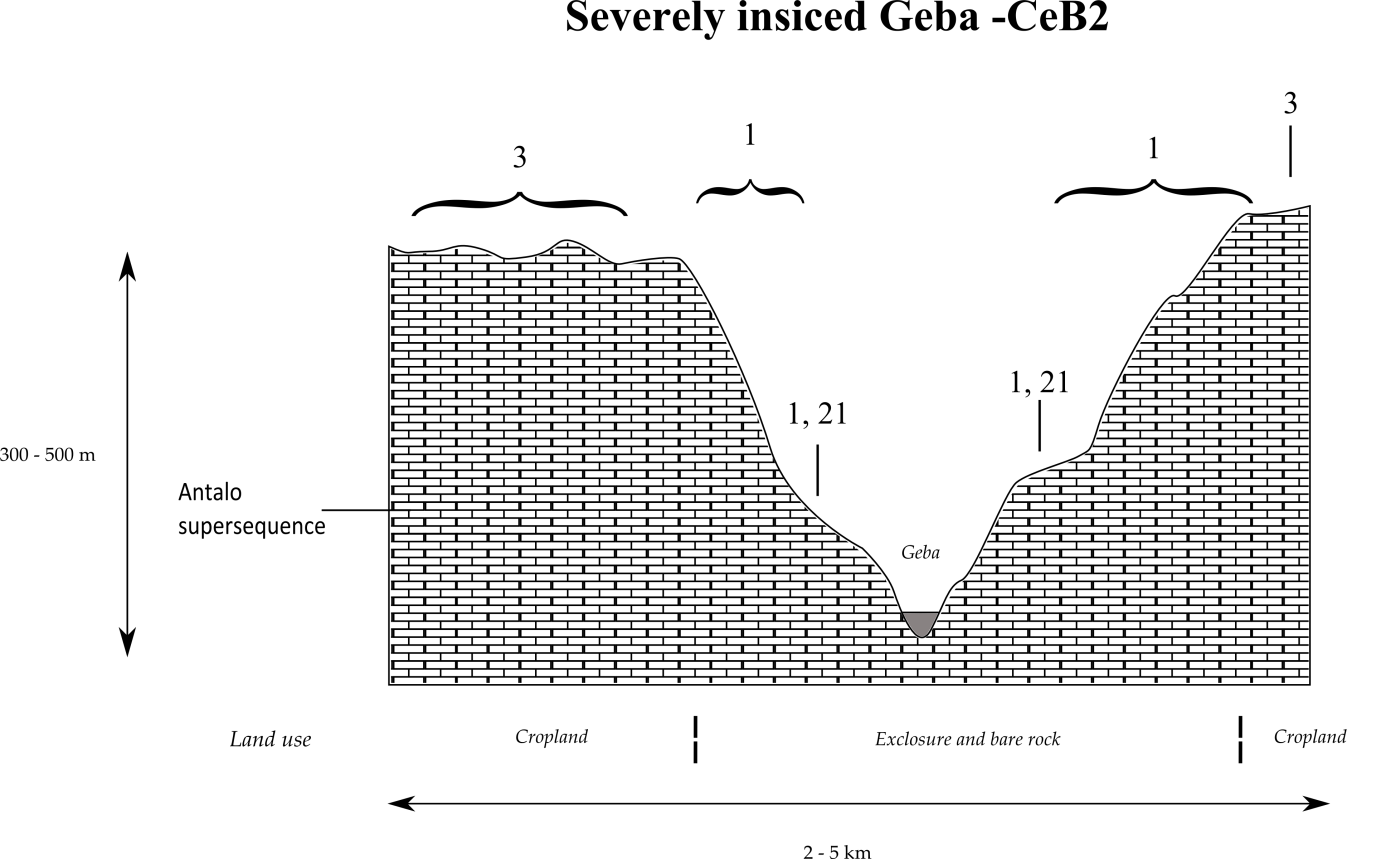
Typical catena in the severely incised Giba gorge

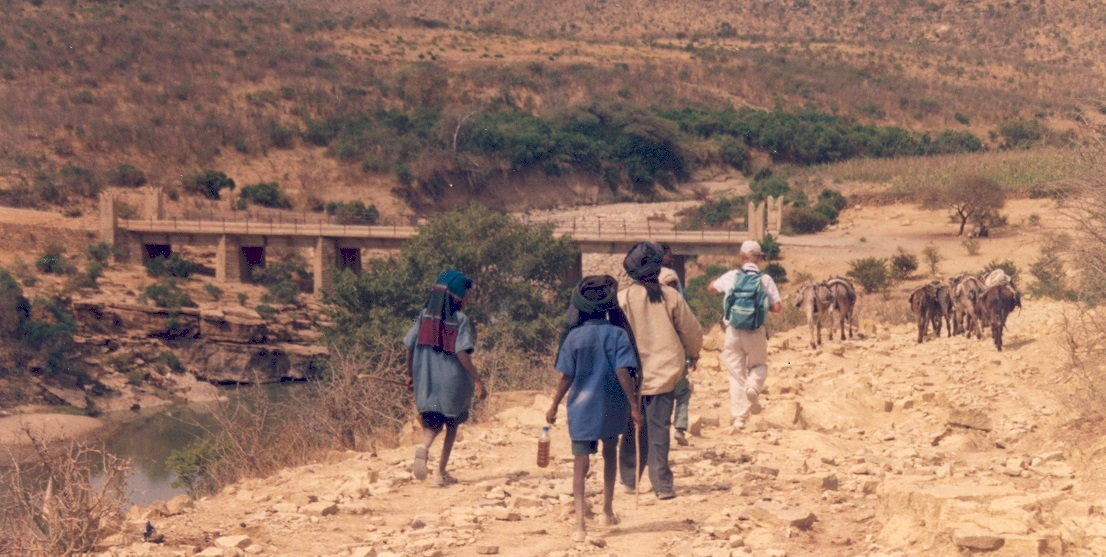
Giba river near Inda Mihtsun

- Dominant soil type: complex of rock outcrops, very stony and very shallow soils ((Lithic) Leptosol) (1)
- Associated soil types
  - shallow, stony, dark, loamy soils on calcaric material (Rendzic Leptosol) (3)
  - shallow, stony to sandy loam soils on calcaric material (Calcaric Regosol and Cambisol) (21)
  - brown loamy sands developed on alluvium along Giba River (Fluvisol)

=== Ancient river terraces ===
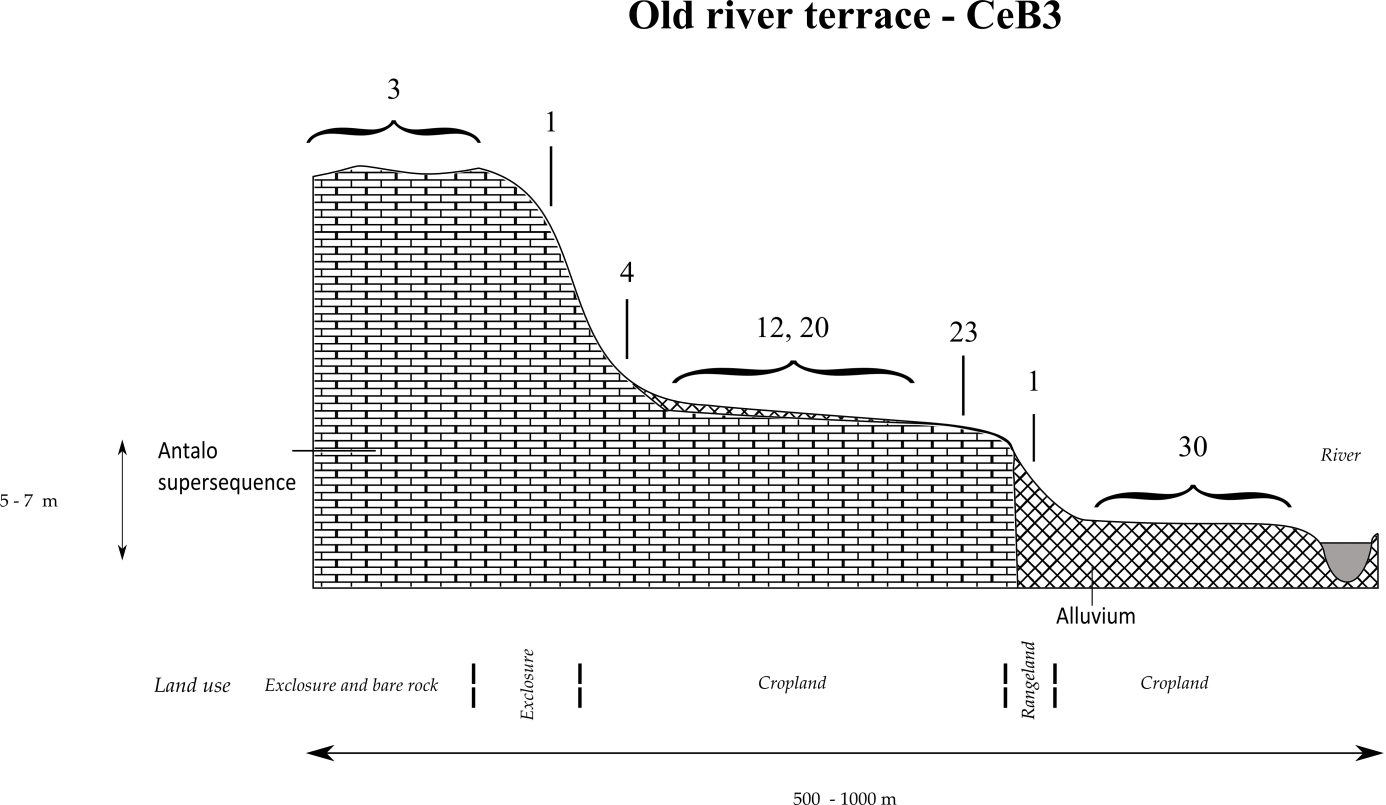
Typical catena on ancient river terraces

- Associated soil types
  - shallow, stony, dark, loamy soils on calcaric material (Rendzic Leptosol) (3)
  - Deep, dark cracking clays with good fertility, but problems of waterlogging (Chromic and Pellic Vertisol) (12)
  - moderately deep, red-brownish, loamy soils with a good natural fertility (Chromic Luvisol) (20)
  - Brown to dark, silty clay loams to loamy sands developed on alluvium, with good natural fertility (Fluvisol) (30)
- Inclusions
  - complex of rock outcrops, very stony and very shallow soils ((Lithic) Leptosol) (1)
  - shallow to very shallow, very stony, loamy soils (Skeletic/Leptic Cambisol and Regosol) (4)
  - shallow, dark, stony, loamy soils on calcaric material, rich on organic matter (Calcaric Mollic Cambisol) (23)

=== Alluvial plains induced by tufa dams ===
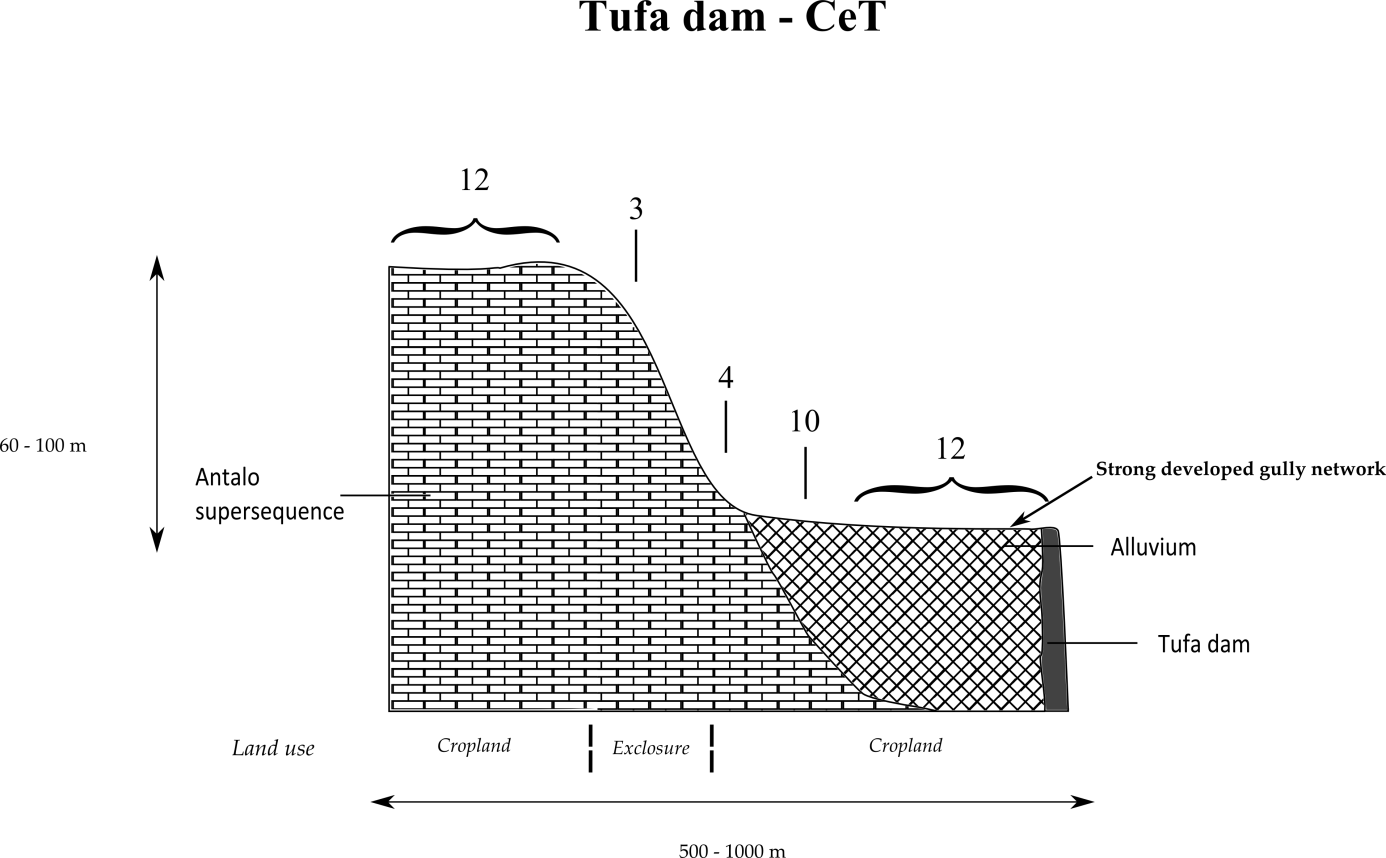
Typical catena on Tufa dam backfill

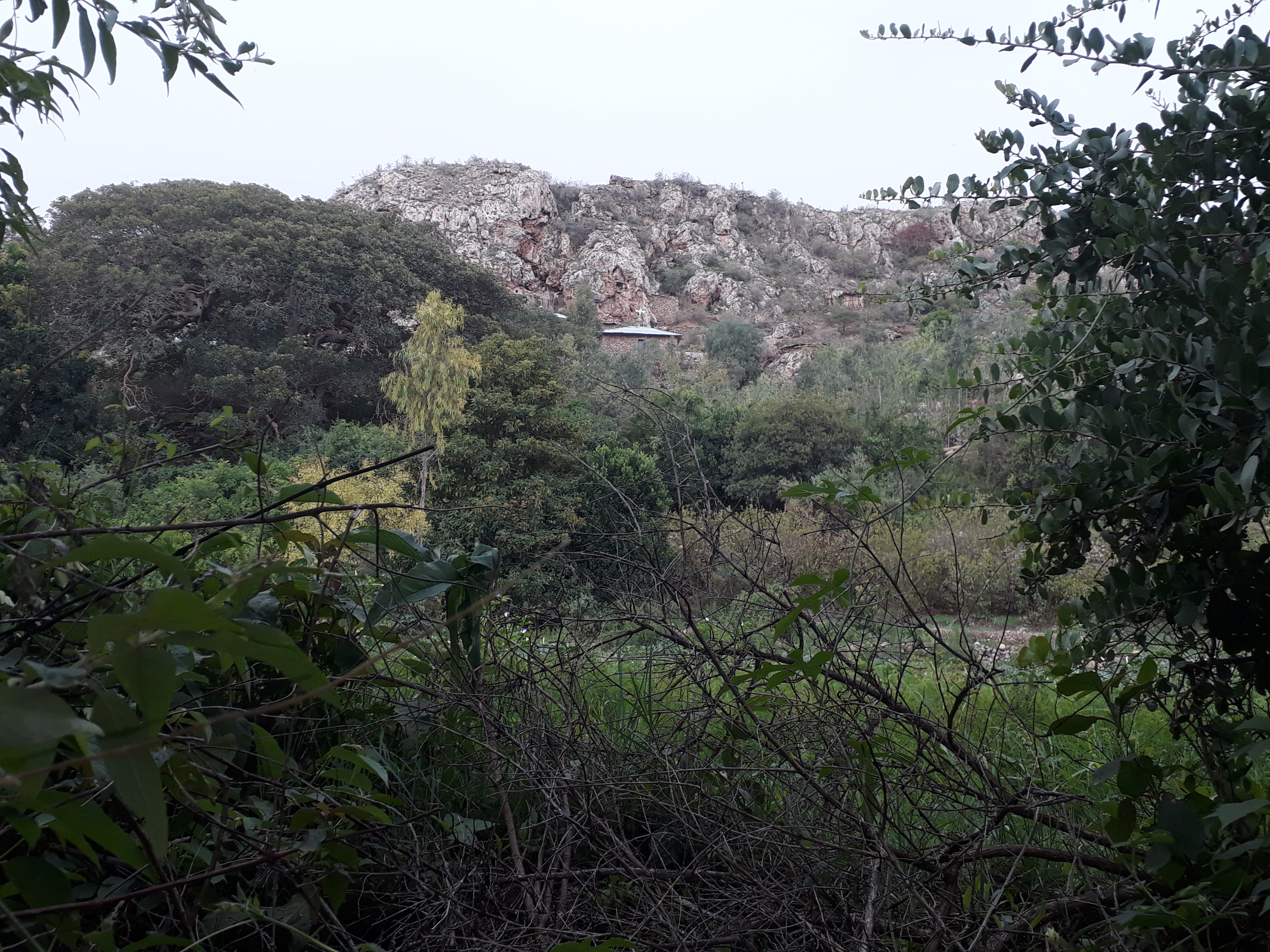
Tufa dam in Chelekwot

- Dominant soil type: deep dark cracking clays with very good natural fertility, waterlogged during the wet season (Chromic Vertisol, Pellic Vertisol) (12)
- Associated soil type: stony, dark cracking clays with good natural fertility (Vertic Cambisol) (10)
- Inclusions
  - shallow, stony, dark, loamy soils on calcaric material (Rendzic Leptosol) (3)
  - shallow, very stony, silt loamy to loamy soils (Skeletic Cambisol, Leptic Cambisol, Skeletic Regosol) (4)

== Soil erosion and conservation ==
The reduced soil protection by vegetation cover, combined with steep slopes and erosive rainfall has led to excessive soil erosion. Nutrients and organic matter were lost and soil depth was reduced. Hence, soil erosion is an important problem, which results in low crop yields and biomass production. As a response to the strong degradation and thanks to the hard labour of many people in the villages, soil conservation has been carried out on a large scale since the 1980s and especially 1980s; this has curbed rates of soil loss. Measures include the construction of infiltration trenches, stone bunds, check dams, small reservoirs such as Addi Amharay, Arato and Hiza'iti Wedi Cheber as well as a major biological measure: exclosures in order to allow forest regeneration. On the other hand, it remains difficult to convince farmers to carry out measures within the farmland (in situ soil management), such as bed and furrows or zero grazing, as there is a fear for loss of income from the land. Such techniques are however very effective.
