= May Gabat =

River in the Tigray highlands of Ethiopia

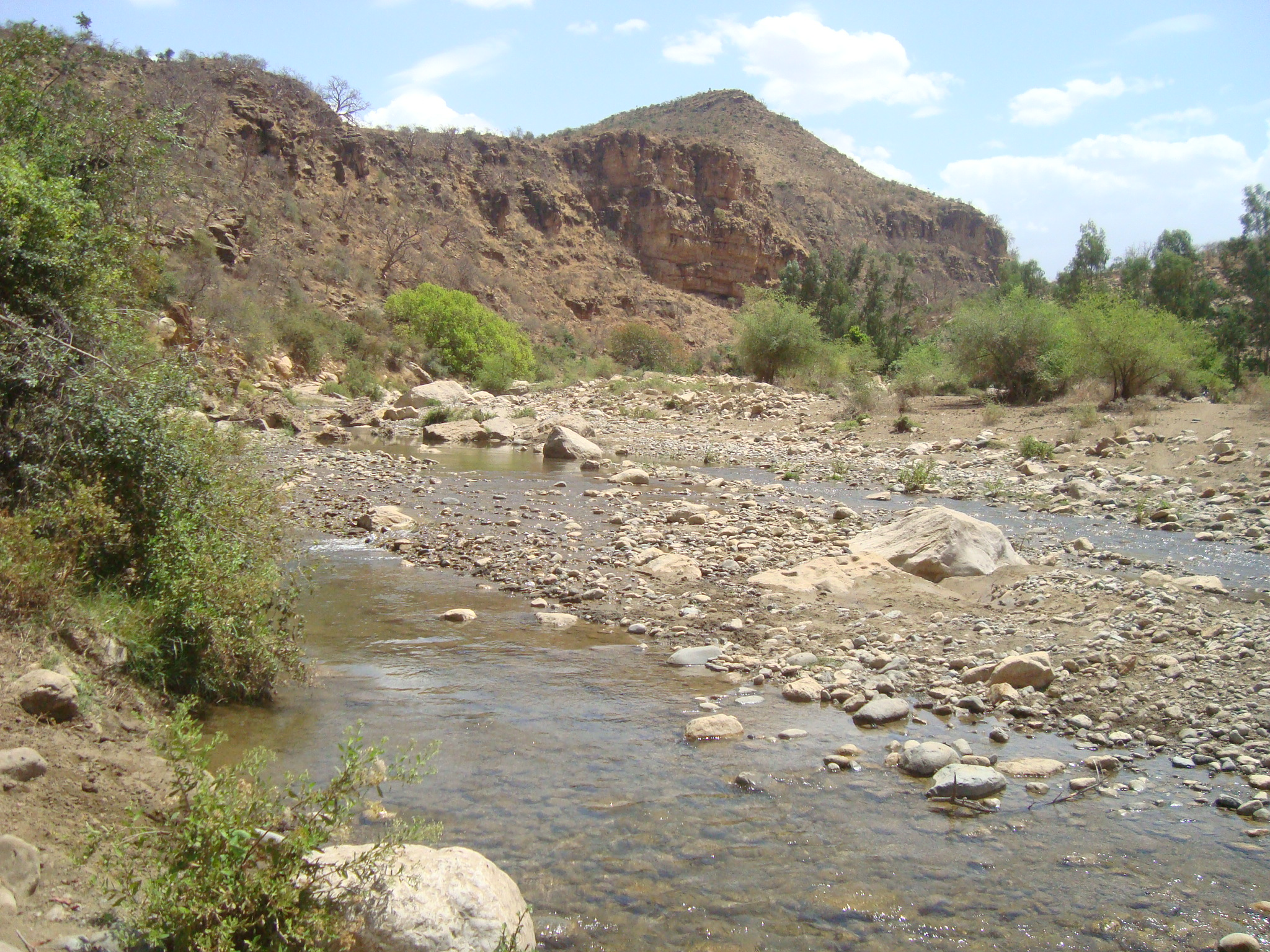
- The May Gabat River near the confluence with Giba River

- May Gabat River in Tigray Region

Location
- Country: Ethiopia
- Region: Tigray Region
- Districts (woreda): Inderta

Physical characteristics
- Source: Hiza'iti Wedi Cheber
  - location: Mereb Miti in Inderta
  - elevation: 2,233 m (7,326 ft)
- Mouth: Giba River
  - location: Kayeh Guila in Debre Nazret municipality
  - coordinates: 13.476°N 39.297°E
  - elevation: 1,590 m (5,220 ft)
- Length: 42 km (26 mi)
- Basin size: 652 km^{2} (252 mi^{2})
- Width
  - average: 15 m (49 ft)
- Discharge
  - location: Near confluence with Giba River
  - maximum: 190 m^{3}/s (6,700 cu ft/s)

Basin features
- Progression: Giba→ Tekezé→ Atbarah→ Nile→ Mediterranean Sea
- River system: Permanent river
- Tributaries
  - right: Kalamino River
- Waterbodies: Hiza'iti Wedi Cheber, Gereb Segen, Gereb Bi'ati, Addi Hilo
- Waterfalls: Maryam Bahrawti
- Bridges: Mereb Miti; road to Gijet
- Topography: Mountains and deep gorges

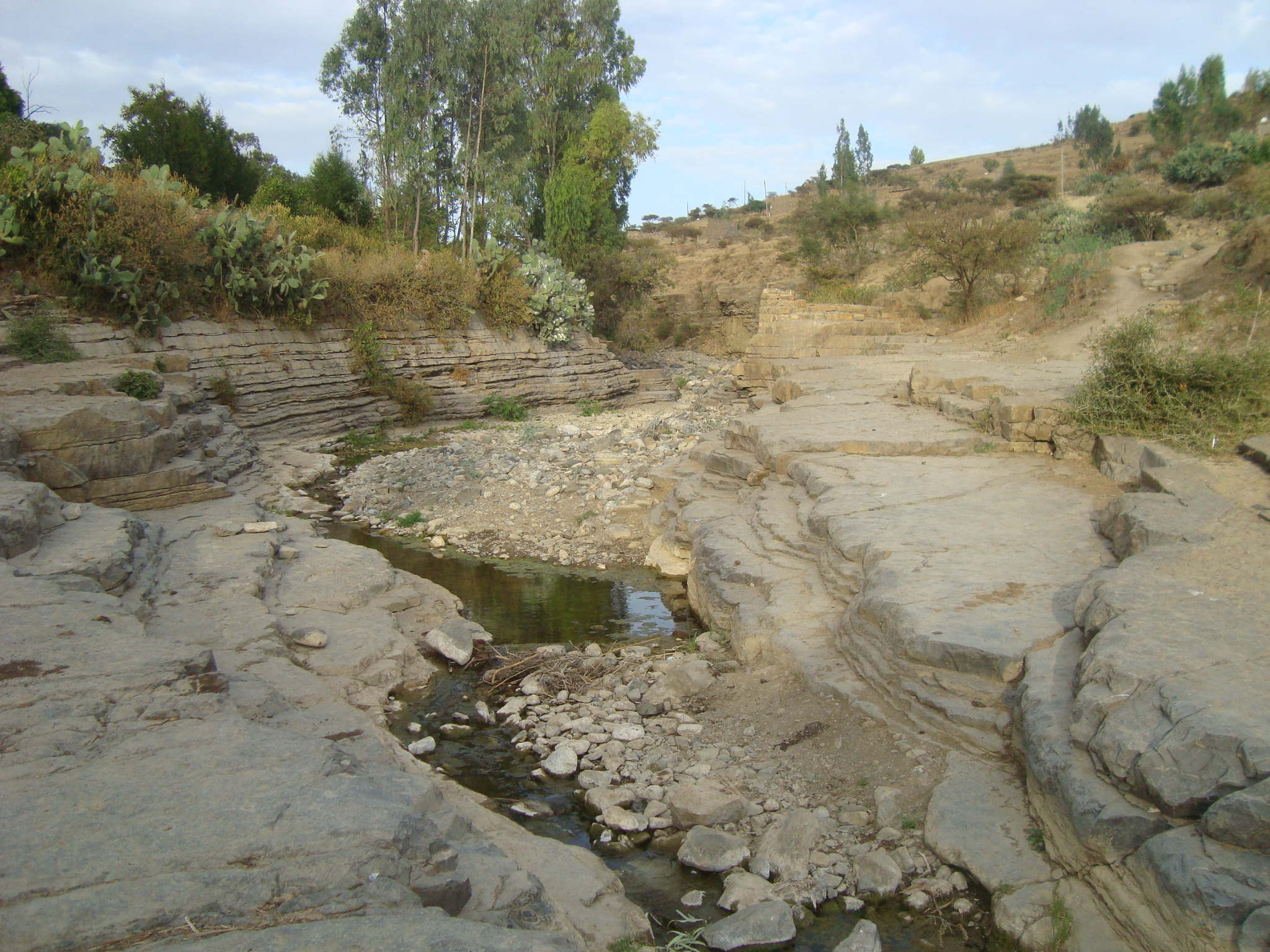
May Gabat in Chelekot

The May Gabat is a river of northern Ethiopia. Rising in the mountains of Inderta (2,233 metres above sea level), it flows westward to Giba River, which empties finally in the Tekezé River. The Gereb Segen reservoir has been built on this river in 2016, mainly for providing Mekelle with potable water.

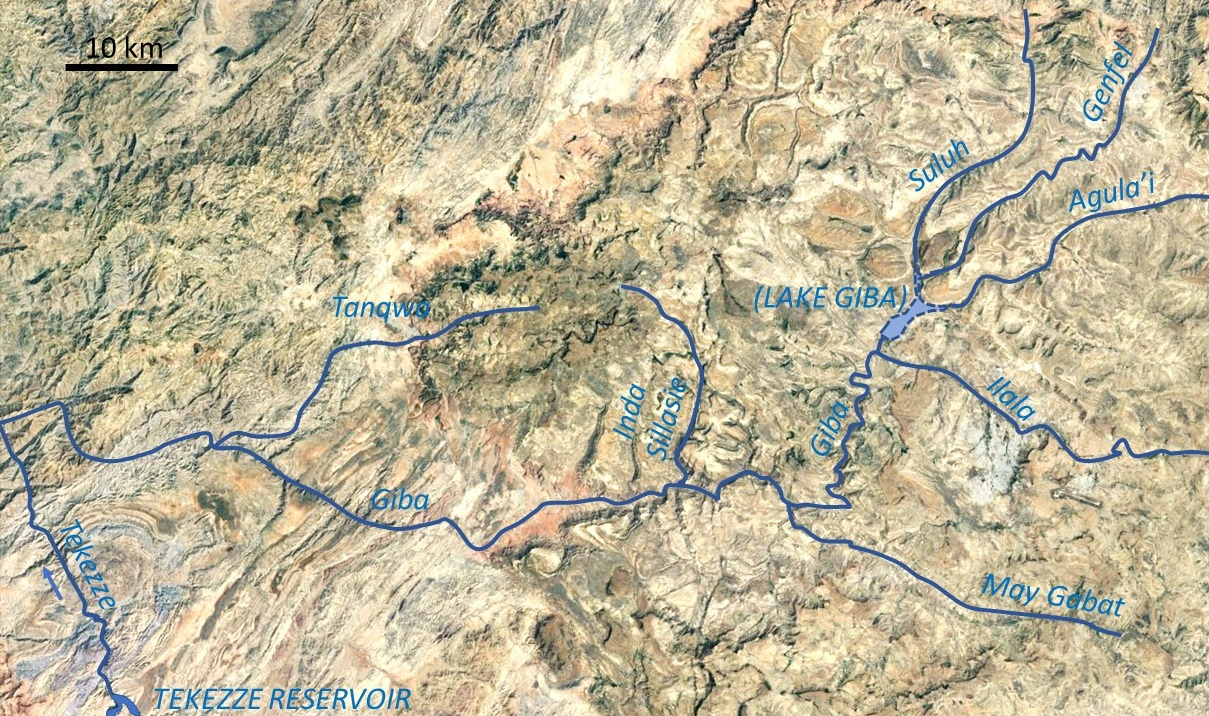
Giba drainage network

== Hydrography ==
It is a confined river, locally meandering in its narrow alluvial plain, with a slope gradient of 15 metres per kilometre. With its tributaries, the river has cut a deep gorge.

=== Tributaries ===
Main tributary is Kalamino River which drains a large part of Mekelle; it joins May Gabat downstream from the Gereb Segen reservoir.

== Hydrology ==
=== Hydrological characteristics ===
The runoff footprint or annual total runoff volume is 58 million m³. Peak discharges up to 190 m³ per second occur in the second part of the rainy season (month of August) when there are strong rains and the soils are saturated with water in many places. The percentage of total rainfall that directly leaves the catchment as storm runoff (also called runoff coefficient) is 9%. As limestone is present in 28% of the catchment this runoff coefficient is less than that of adjacent rivers.

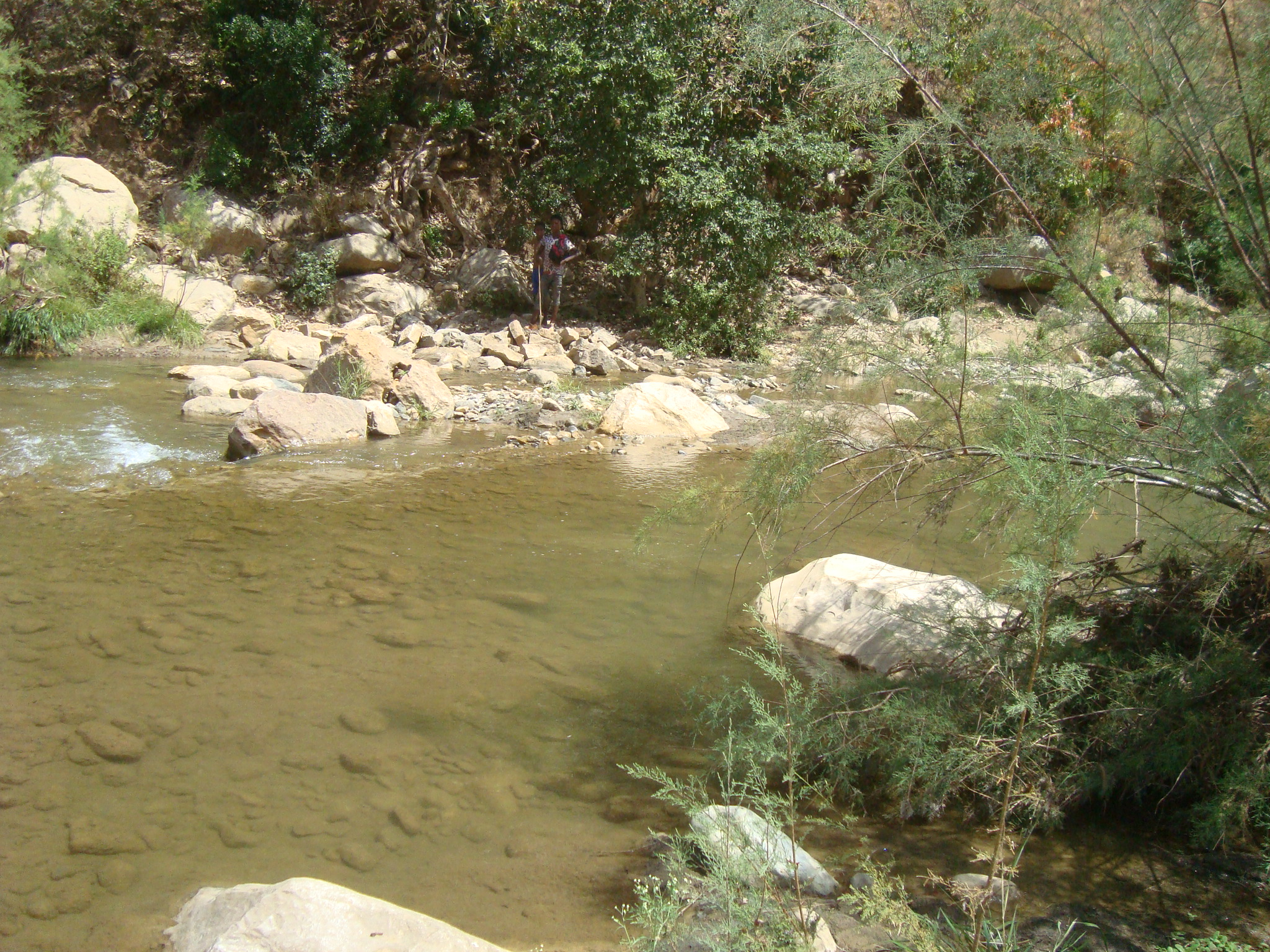
Location of previous May Gabat measuring station

The total amount of sediment that is transported by this river amounts to 373,000 tonnes per year. Median sediment concentration in the river water is 1.8 grammes per litre, but may go up to 64 g/L. The highest sediment concentrations occur at the beginning of the rainy season, when loose soil and dust is washed away by overland flow and ends up in the river. As such water contains many nutrients (locally it is called "aygi"), farmers estimate that it strengthens their cattle, which they will bring to the river. All in all, average sediment yield is 752 tonnes per km^{2} and per year. All measurements were done at a purposively installed station near the mouth of the river, in the years 2006–2007. It is anticipated that the mentioned values have strongly decreased after construction of the Gereb Segen reservoir, because it intercepts water and sediment.

=== Flash floods ===
Runoff mostly occurs in the form of high runoff discharge events that occur in a very short period (called flash floods). These are related to the steep topography, often little vegetation cover and intense convective rainfall. The peaks of such flash floods have often a 50 to 100 times larger discharge than the preceding baseflow. These flash floods mostly occur during the evening or night, because the convective rain showers occur in the afternoon.

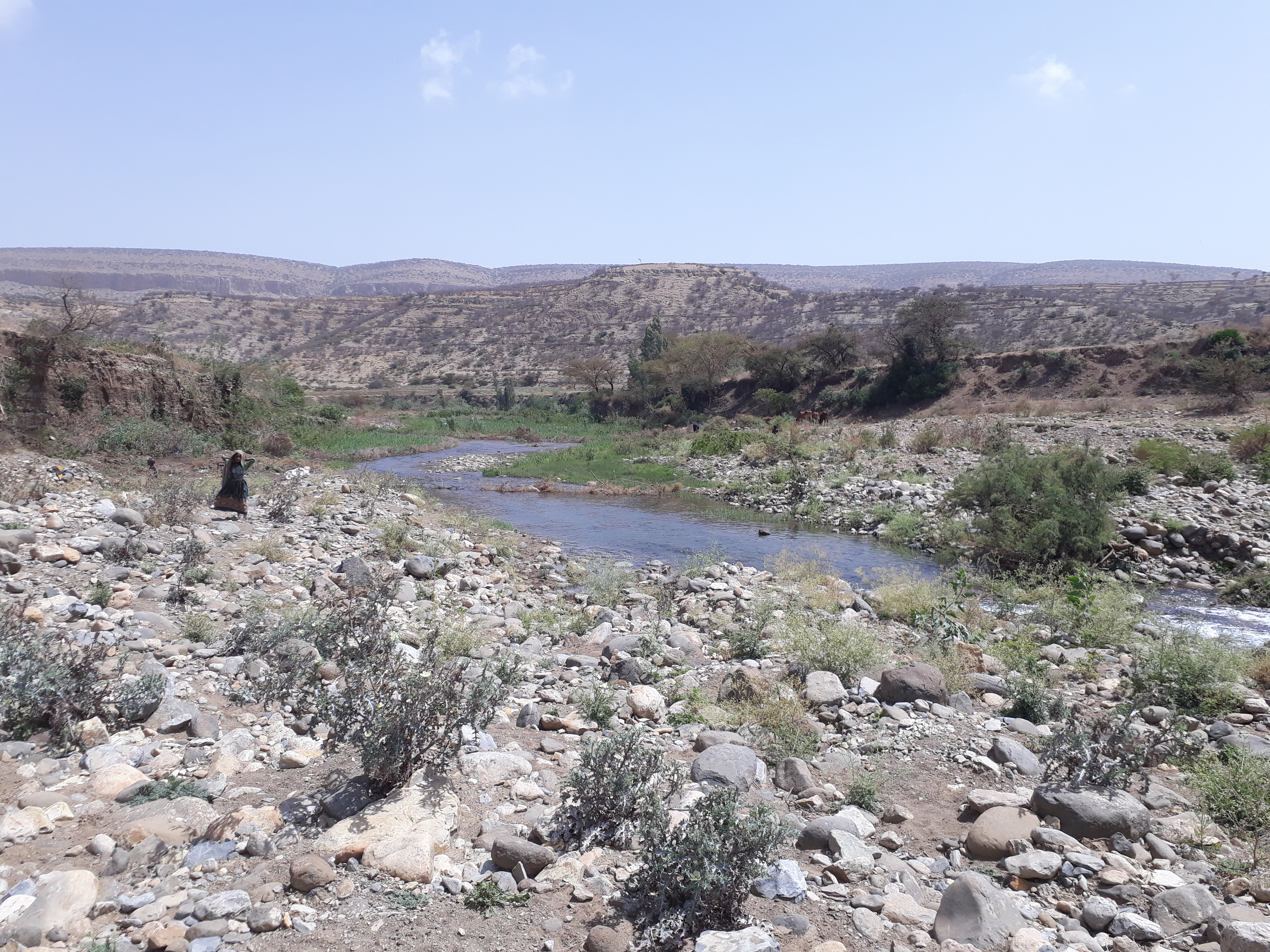
May Gabat downstream from Gereb Segenreservoir – the river has become regularised thanks to seepage from the reservoir

=== Changes over time ===
Evidence given by Italian aerial photographs of the catchment, taken in the 1930s show that 48% of the catchment was covered with woody vegetation (against 33% in 2014). This vegetation could better slow down runoff in earlier times. On the other hand, five reservoirs intercepted already the floods in the headwaters and the runoff coefficient was smaller in 2014 (12% in 1935 against 9% in 2014). Up to the 1980s, there was strong pressure on the environment, and much vegetation disappeared. This river had its greatest discharges and width in that period. The magnitude of floods in this river has also been decreased in recent years due to interventions in the catchment. On steep slopes, exclosures have been established; the dense vegetation largely contributes to enhanced infiltration, less flooding and better baseflow. Physical conservation structures such as stone bunds and check dams also intercept runoff.

== Irrigated agriculture ==
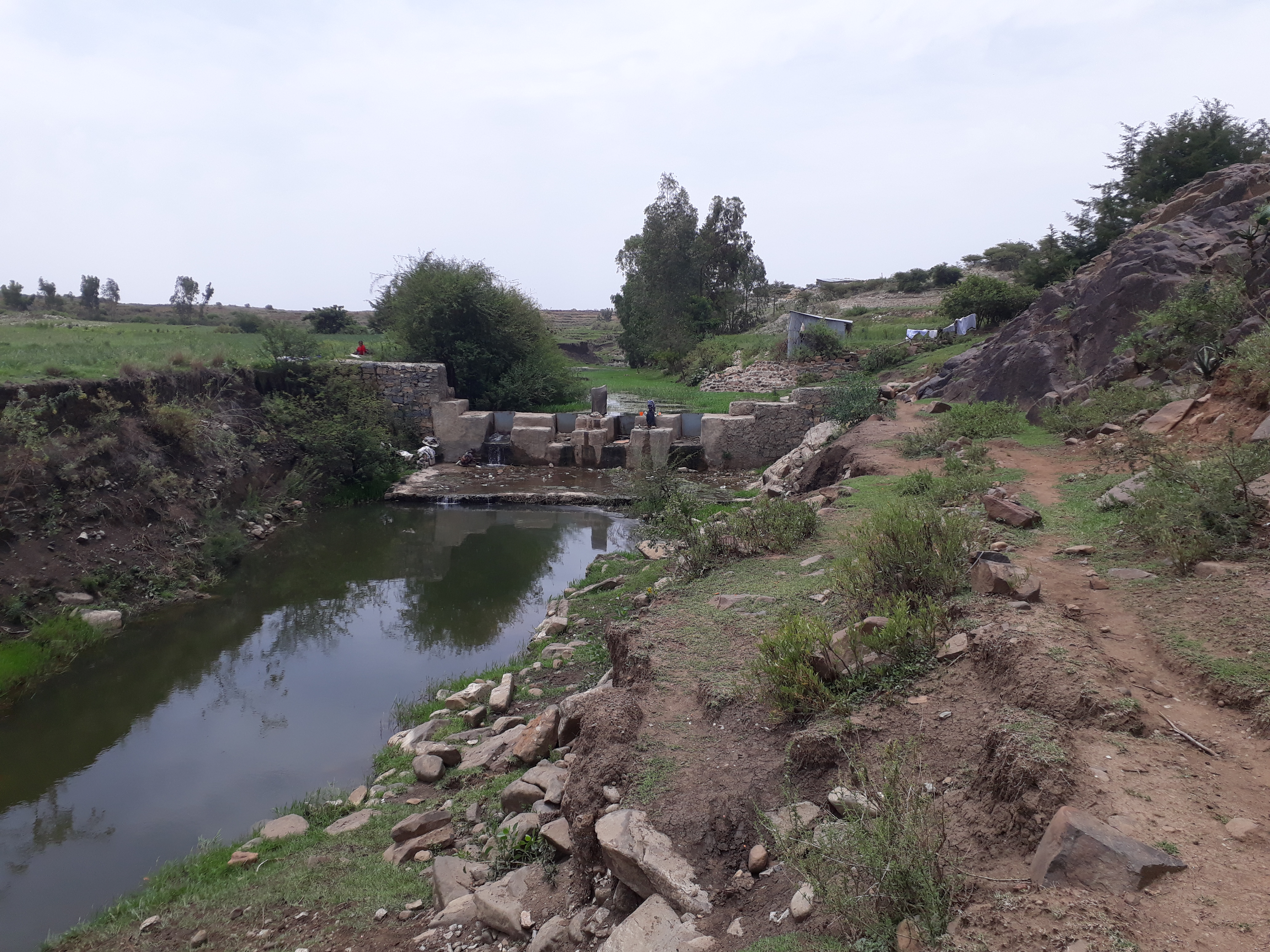
Irrigation scheme in Upper Gabat

Besides springs and reservoirs, irrigation is strongly dependent on the river's baseflow. Such irrigated agriculture is important in meeting the demands for food security and poverty reduction. Irrigated lands are established in the narrow alluvial plains along the river in many places; the farmers use motor pumps to pump baseflow water generated by seepage from Hiza'iti Wedi Cheber, Gereb Segen and Gereb Bi'ati reservoirs.

== Transhumance towards the river gorge ==
The valley bottoms in the lower gorge of this river have been identified as a transhumance destination zone. Transhumance takes place in the summer rainy season, when the lands near the villages are occupied by crops. Young shepherds will take the village cattle down to the gorge and overnight in small caves. The gorges are particularly attractive as a transhumance destination zone, because there is water and good growth of semi-natural vegetation.

== Boulders and pebbles in the river bed ==
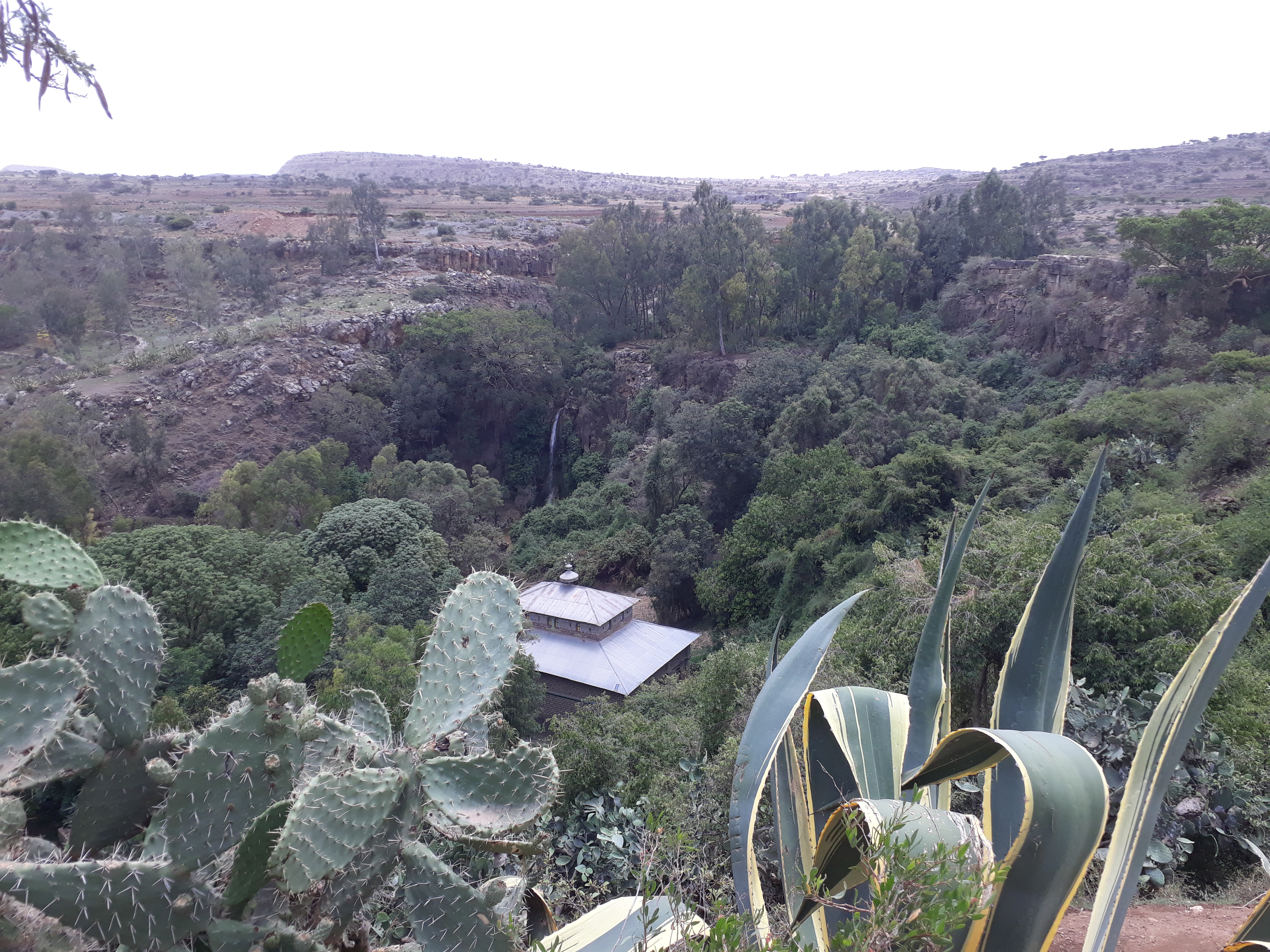
Maryam Bahrawti church forest in the headwaters of May Gabat. The river passes a tufa dam with a waterfall

Boulders and pebbles encountered in the river bed can originate from any location higher up in the catchment. In the uppermost stretches of the river, only rock fragments of the upper lithological units will be present in the river bed, whereas more downstream one may find a more comprehensive mix of all lithologies crossed by the river. From upstream to downstream, the following lithological units occur in the catchment.

- Amba Aradam Formation
- Antalo Limestone
- Mekelle Dolerite
- Quaternary freshwater tufa
- Adigrat Sandstone

== Natural boundary ==
During its course, this river passes through Inderta district. In historical times, the Inderta Province was wider than currently, and May Gabat constituted the border between Inderta proper (capital: Mekelle) and Gabat Mellash, literally meaning "beyond (May) Gabat", with Hintalo as its capital.

== Trekking ==
Trekking routes have been established in nearby Dogu'a Tembien. The tracks are not marked on the ground but can be followed using downloaded .GPX files. Trek 18, through the southwestern mountains of Dogu'a Tembien, allows panoramic views on lower May Gabat (including Gereb Segen reservoir) and the river mouth.

== See also ==
- List of Ethiopian rivers
