= Imbagedo =

- Location within Ethiopia Location within Africa
- Coordinates: 13°29′N 39°40′E
- Type: Freshwater artificial lake
- Basin countries: Ethiopia
- Surface area: 0.36 km^{2} (0.14 sq mi)
- Water volume: 1.776278×10^{6} m^{3} (1,440.052 acre⋅ft)
- Settlements: Kwiha

Imbagedo is a reservoir located in the Inderta woreda of the Tigray Region in Ethiopia. The earthen dam that holds the reservoir was built in 1998 by SAERT.

== Dam characteristics ==
- Dam height: 20 metres
- Dam crest length: 328 metres
- Spillway width: 20 metres

== Capacity ==
- Original capacity: 1 776 278 m³
- Dead storage: 360 000 m³
- Reservoir area: 36 ha

In 2002, the life expectancy of the reservoir (the duration before it is filled with sediment) was estimated at 24 years.

== Irrigation ==
- Designed irrigated area: 80 ha

== Environment ==
The catchment of the reservoir is 12.4 km² large. The reservoir suffers from rapid siltation. Part of the water that could be used for irrigation is lost through seepage; the positive side-effect is that this contributes to groundwater recharge.
