= Addi Akhor =

- Location within Ethiopia
- Coordinates: 13°30′N 39°40′E
- Type: Freshwater artificial lake
- Basin countries: Ethiopia
- Surface area: 0.0819 km^{2} (0.0316 sq mi)
- Water volume: 0.510777×10^{6} m^{3} (414.094 acre⋅ft)
- Settlements: Kwiha

Addi Akhor is a reservoir located in the Enderta district of the Tigray Region in Ethiopia. The earthen dam that holds the reservoir was built in 1998 by SAERT.

== Dam characteristics ==
- Dam height: 18 metres (59 ft)
- Dam crest length: 210 metres (690 ft)
- Spillway width: 1.3 metres (4 ft 3 in)

== Capacity ==
- Original capacity: 510,777 m^{3} (18,037,900 cu ft)
- Dead storage: 6,008 m^{3} (212,200 cu ft)
- Reservoir area: 8.19 ha (20.2 acres)

In 2002, the life expectancy of the reservoir (the duration before it is filled with sediment) was estimated at 30 years.

== Irrigation ==
- Designed irrigated area: 30 ha (74 acres)
- Actual irrigated area in 2002: 20 ha (49 acres)

== Environment ==
The catchment of the reservoir is 2.75 km^{2} (1.06 sq mi) large. The reservoir suffers from rapid siltation. The lithology of the catchment is Antalo Limestone and Mekelle Dolerite. Part of the water that could be used for irrigation is lost through seepage; the positive side-effect is that this contributes to groundwater recharge.
