= Era Quhila =

Reservoir in Ethiopia

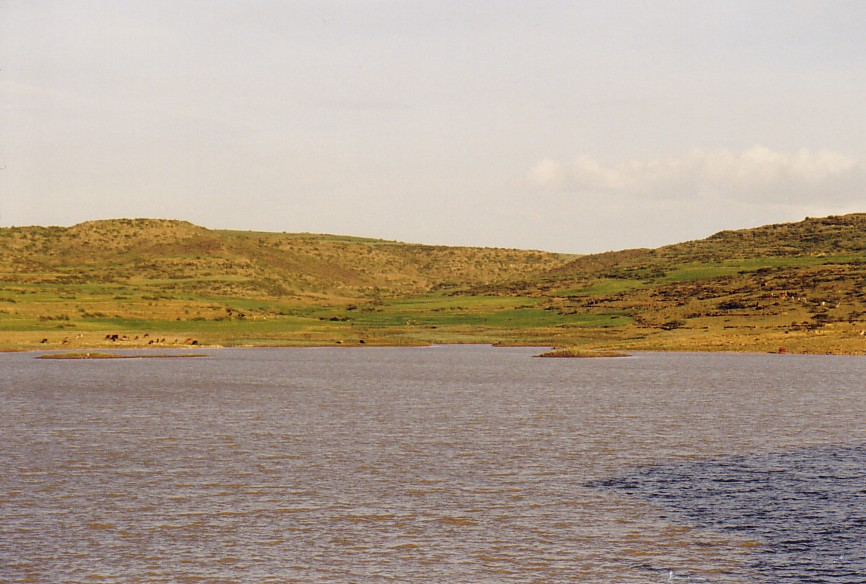

- Location within Ethiopia
- Coordinates: 13.44657408°N 39.59770361°E
- Type: Freshwater artificial lake
- Basin countries: Ethiopia
- Water volume: 1.185×10^{6} m^{3} (961 acre⋅ft)
- Surface elevation: 2,320 m (7,610 ft)
- Settlements: Kwiha

Era Quhila is a reservoir located in the Inderta woreda of the Tigray Region in Ethiopia. The earthen dam that holds the reservoir was built in 1997 by the Tigray Bureau of Agriculture and Natural Resources.

== Dam characteristics ==
- Dam crest length: 180 metres (590 ft)
- Spillway width: 15 metres (49 ft)
- Original capacity: 1,185,000 m^{3} (41,800,000 cu ft)

== Irrigation ==
- Designed irrigated area: 87 hectares (210 acres; 870,000 m^{2})
- Actual irrigated area in 2002: 25 hectares (62 acres; 250,000 m^{2})

== Environment ==
The catchment of the reservoir is 12.86 km^{2} (4.97 sq mi) large, with a perimeter of 14 kilometres (8.7 mi) and a length of 4,550 metres (14,930 ft). The reservoir suffers from rapid siltation. The lithology of the catchment is Agula shale and a bit of Mekelle Dolerite. Part of the water that could be used for irrigation is lost through seepage; the positive side-effect is that this contributes to groundwater recharge.
