= Arato =

Arato or Arató could refer to:

- Arato (reservoir), a reservoir in the Tigray Region, Ethiopia
- Arato Station, a railway station in Shirataka, Japan
- András István Arató (born 1945), Hungarian farmer, known for the "Hide the Pain Harold" meme
- Andrew Arato, professor of Political and Social Theory
- Gergely Arató, Hungarian parliamentarian
- Genjiro Arato (1946–2016), Japanese film producer, director, and actor
