= Enderta =

Enderta may refer to:

- Enderta province, a historic subdivision of Ethiopia
- Enderta (woreda), a woreda within the Tigray Region of Ethiopia
