= Inda Zib'i =

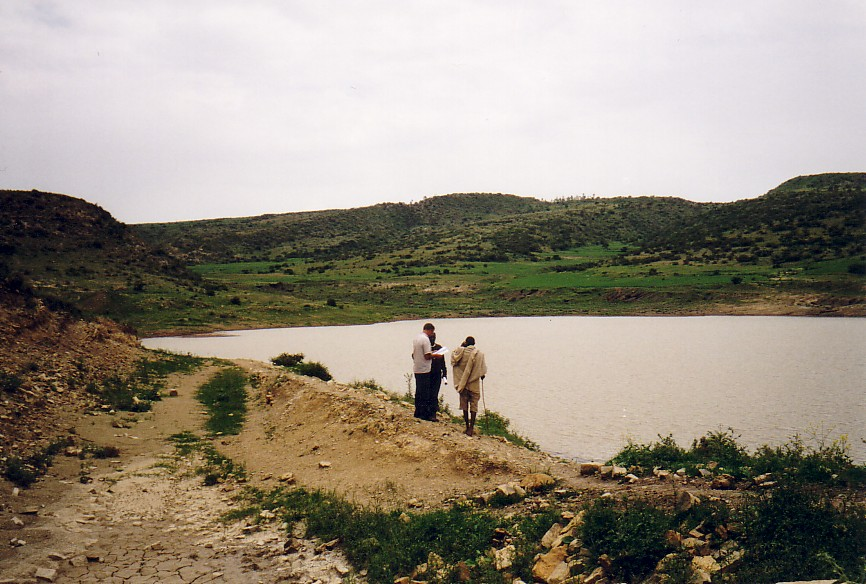

- Location within Ethiopia
- Coordinates: 13.46980156°N 39.65274114°E
- Type: Freshwater artificial lake
- Basin countries: Ethiopia
- Surface area: 0.04 km^{2} (0.015 sq mi)
- Water volume: 0.182593×10^{6} m^{3} (148.031 acre⋅ft)
- Surface elevation: 2,400 m (7,900 ft)
- Settlements: Araguren

Inda Zib'i is a reservoir located in the Inderta woreda of the Tigray Region in Ethiopia. The earthen dam that holds the reservoir was built in 1999 by SAERT.

== Dam characteristics ==
- Dam height: 12.34 metres
- Dam crest length: 227 metres
- Spillway width: 2 metres

== Capacity ==
- Original capacity: 182 593 m³
- Dead storage: 20 000 m³
- Reservoir area: 4.05 ha

In 2002, the life expectancy of the reservoir (the duration before it is filled with sediment) was estimated at 25 years.

== Irrigation ==
- Designed irrigated area: 13 ha
- Actual irrigated area in 2002: 0 ha

== Environment ==
The catchment of the reservoir is 1.49 km² large, with a perimeter of 4.77 km and a length of 1320 metres. The reservoir suffers from rapid siltation. The lithology of the catchment is Agula Shale. Part of the water that could be used for irrigation is lost through seepage; the positive side-effect is that this contributes to groundwater recharge.
