= Addi Hilo =

Reservoir in Ethiopia

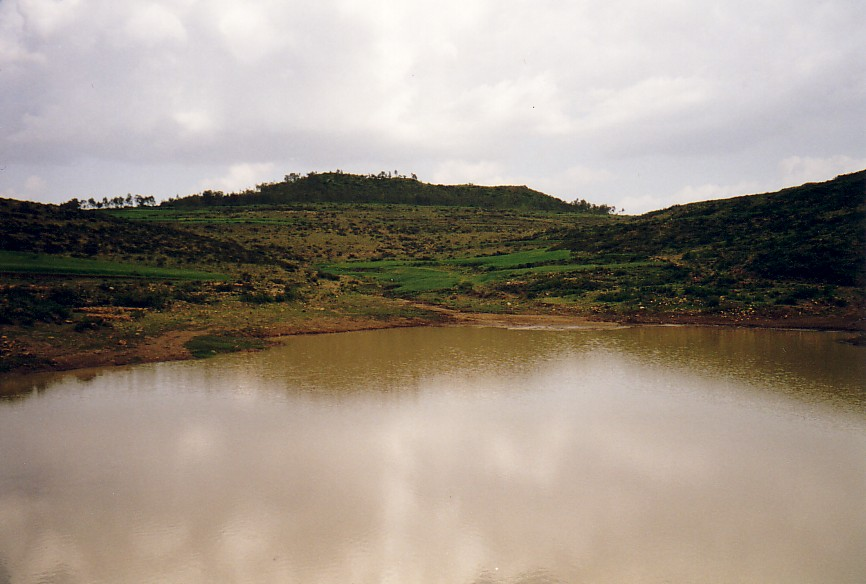

- Location within Ethiopia
- Coordinates: 13.44277616°N 39.56654435°E
- Type: Freshwater artificial lake
- Basin countries: Ethiopia
- Surface area: 0.025 km^{2} (0.0097 sq mi)
- Water volume: 0.108806×10^{6} m^{3} (88.210 acre⋅ft)
- Surface elevation: 2,310 m (7,580 ft)
- Settlements: Kwiha

Addi Hilo is a reservoir located in the Inderta woreda of the Tigray Region in Ethiopia. The earthen dam that holds the reservoir was built in 1998 by SAERT.

== Dam characteristics ==
- Dam height: 11.4 metres
- Dam crest length: 171 metres
- Spillway width: 1 metre

== Capacity ==
- Original capacity: 108 806 m^{3}
- Dead storage: 4328 m^{3}
- Reservoir area: 2.5 ha

In 2002, the life expectancy of the reservoir (the duration before it is filled with sediment) was estimated at 9 years.

== Irrigation ==
- Designed irrigated area: 9 ha
- Actual irrigated area in 2002: 9 ha

== Environment ==
The catchment of the reservoir is 0.72 km^{2} large, with a perimeter of 3.34 km and a length of 1210 metres. The reservoir suffers from rapid siltation. The lithology of the catchment is dominantly Agula shale and little Mekelle dolerite. Part of the water that could be used for irrigation is lost through seepage; the positive side-effect is that this contributes to groundwater recharge.
