= Godew =

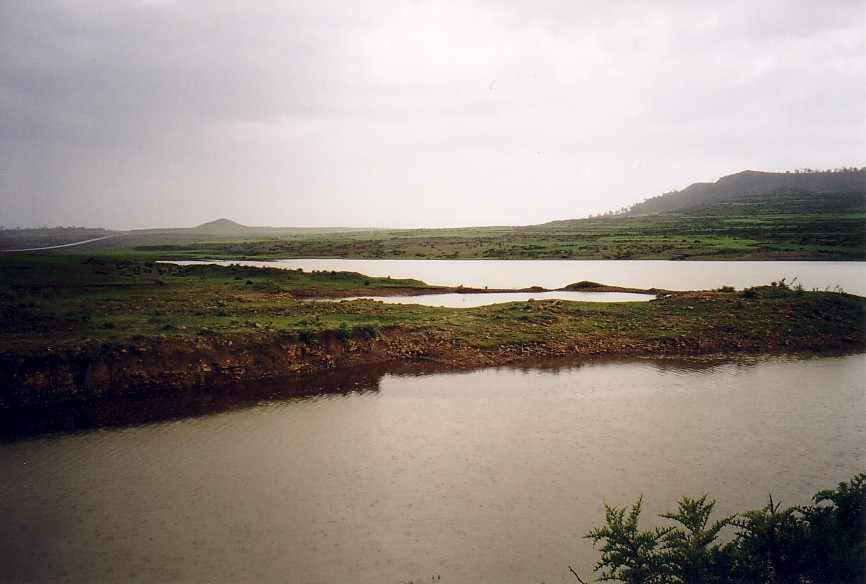

- Location within Ethiopia
- Coordinates: 13.44388992°N 39.54534603°E
- Type: Freshwater artificial lake
- Basin countries: Ethiopia
- Surface elevation: 2,280 m (7,480 ft)
- Settlements: Ashegoda

Godew is a reservoir located in the Inderta woreda of the Tigray Region in Ethiopia. The earthen dam that holds the reservoir was built in 1990 by the Tigray Bureau of Agriculture and Natural Resources.

== Environment ==
The catchment of the reservoir is 4 km^{2} large, with a perimeter of 10.45 km (of which 326 metres is occupied by the dam) and a length of 3260 metres. The reservoir suffers from rapid siltation. The lithology of the catchment is Mekelle Dolerite and Agula Shale. Part of the water that could be used for irrigation is lost through seepage; the positive side-effect is that this contributes to groundwater recharge.
