= Gereb Segen (May Gabat) =

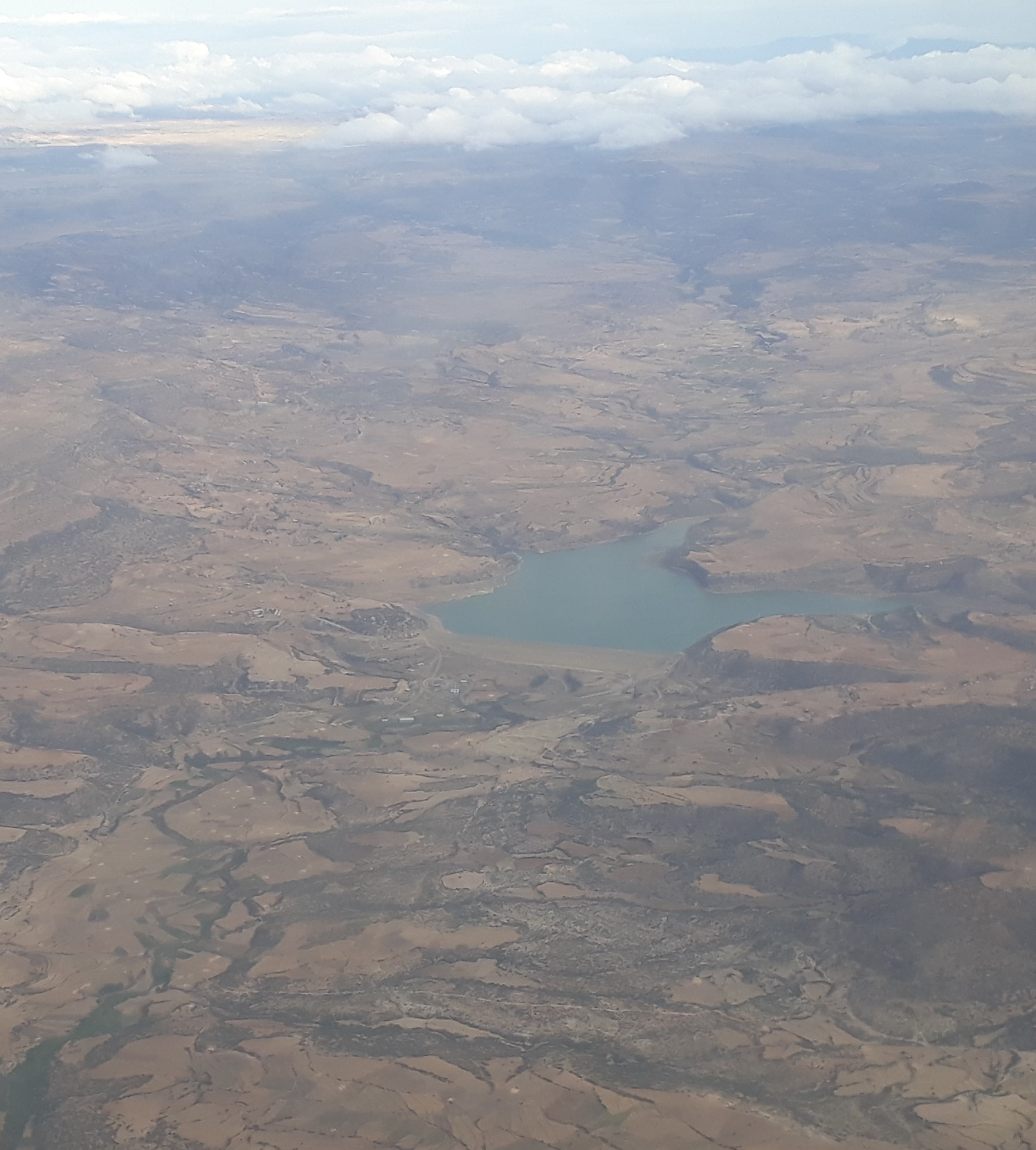

- Location within Ethiopia
- Coordinates: 13.404°N 39.4°E
- Type: Freshwater artificial lake
- Primary inflows: May Gabat
- Primary outflows: May Gabat
- Basin countries: Ethiopia
- Surface area: 1.3 km^{2} (0.50 sq mi)
- Surface elevation: 1,869 m (6,132 ft)

Gereb Segen is a reservoir located in the Inderta woreda of the Tigray Region in Ethiopia. The earthen dam that holds the reservoir was built in 2016 by the Tigray Water Bureau, with the main aim of providing Mekelle with water.

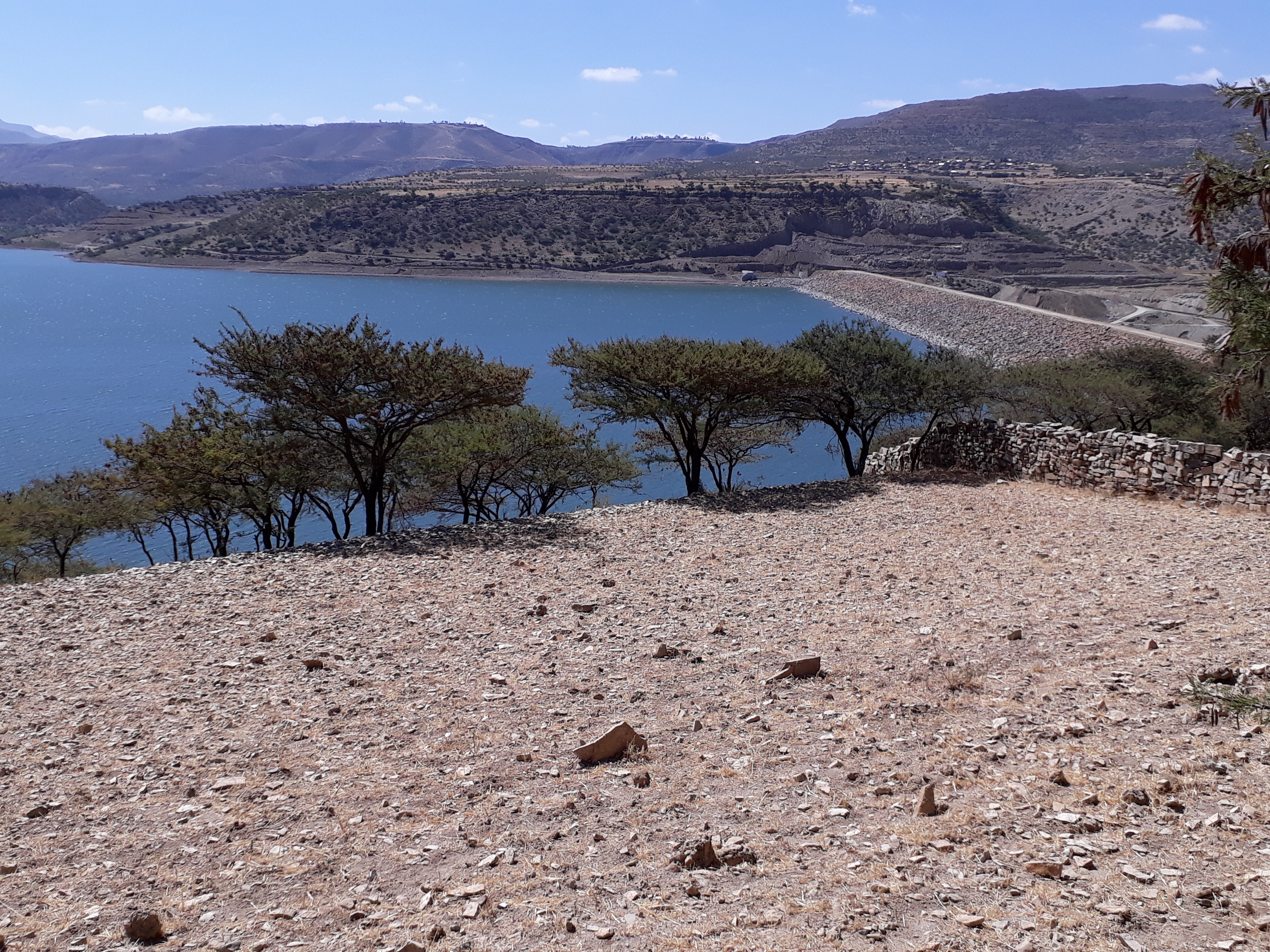
Gereb Segen dam and reservoir

== Challenges ==
In 2018-2019 the reservoir was unable to sustain the water needs of Mekelle

- Pipe diameters are underfit
- Leakage through the abutment
- Sediment deposition by May Gabat river

== Irrigation ==
Though the reservoir was not intended for irrigation, its seepage water is used in the downstream valley for irrigation. The lithology of the catchment is Antalo Limestone. Part of the water is lost through seepage; the positive side-effect is that this contributes to groundwater recharge, and it allows irrigation by the downstream communities.

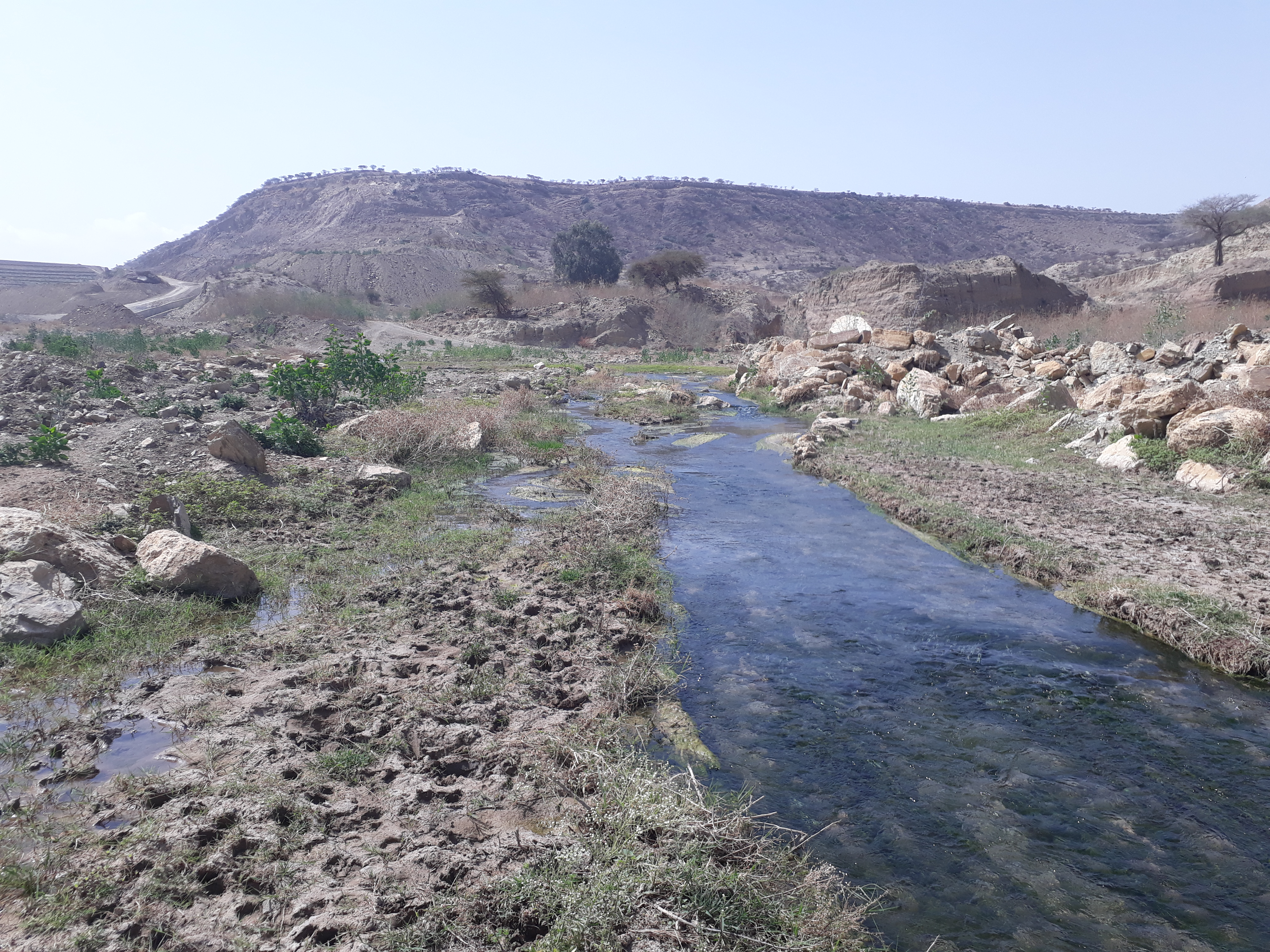
Leakage from Gereb Segen dam

== Homonymous places ==
There is a (much smaller) reservoir with the same name, some 20 km to the southeast: Gereb Segen (Hintalo).

== Spillway collapse ==
On August 19, 2024 the spillway of the dam collapsed, also damaging the downstream irrigation canal.

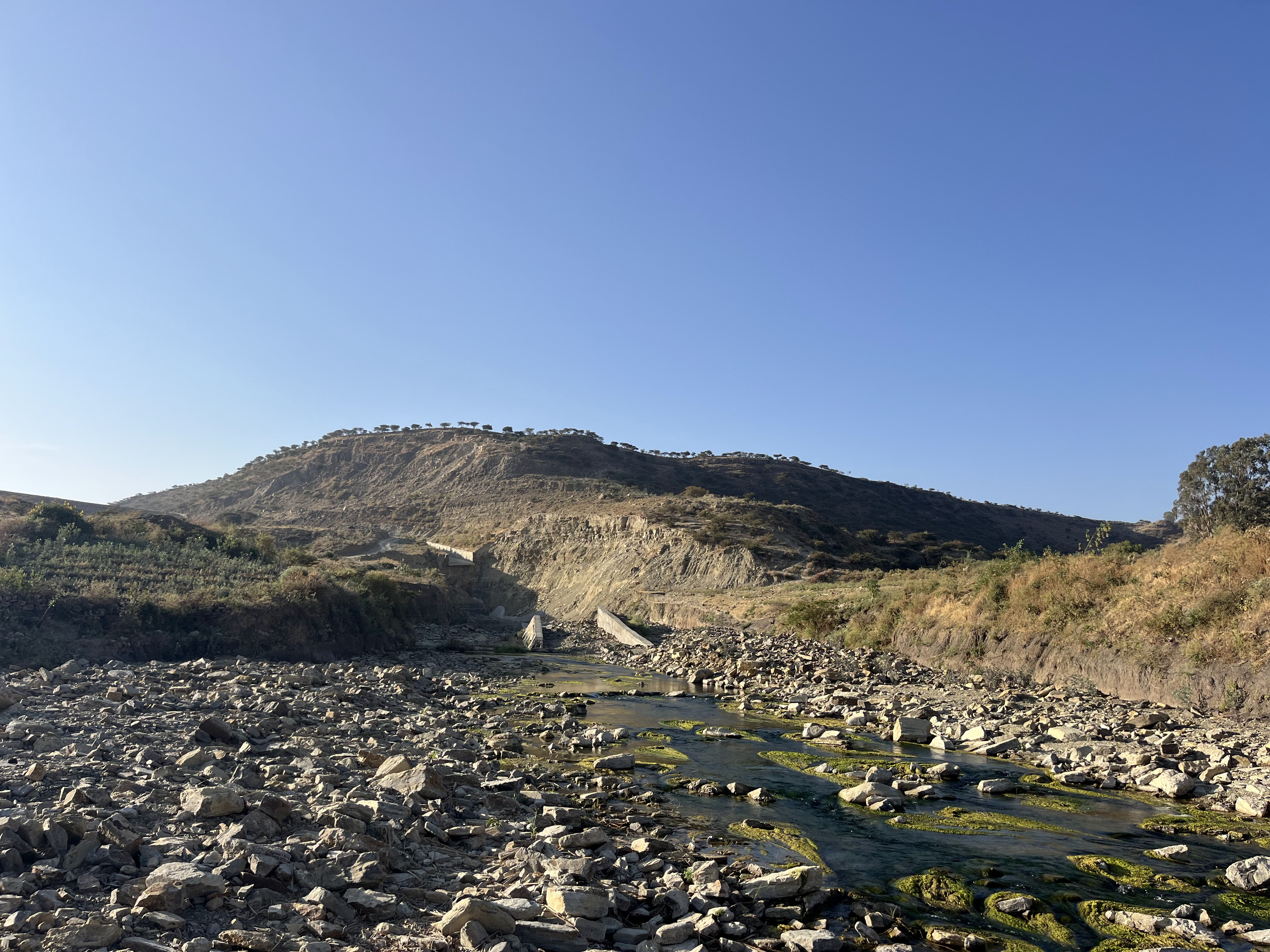
Collapsed spillway
