= Gereb Shegal =

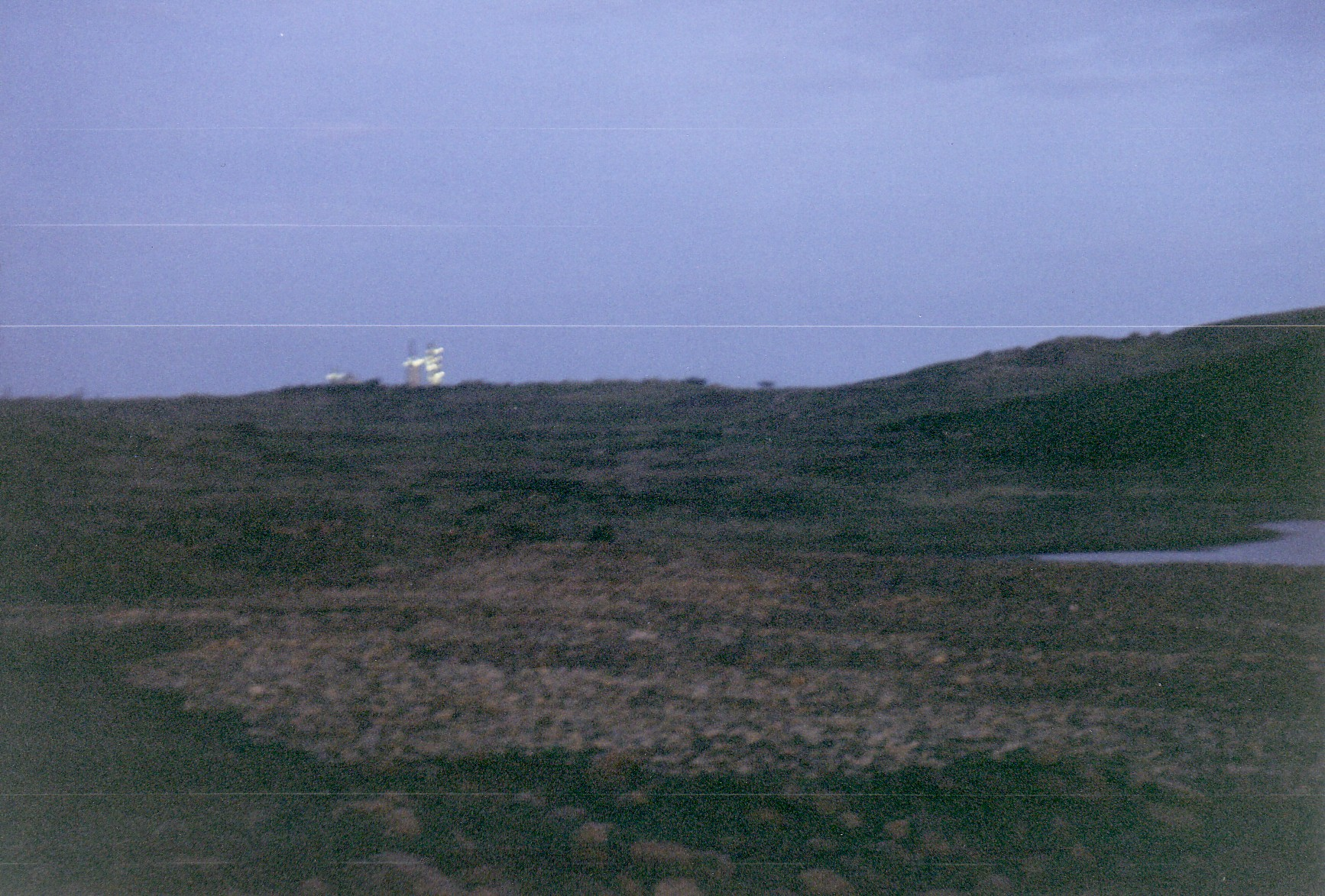

- Location within Ethiopia
- Coordinates: 13.58772585°N 39.45243401°E
- Type: Freshwater artificial lake
- Basin countries: Ethiopia
- Surface area: 0.171 km^{2} (0.066 sq mi)
- Water volume: 1×10^{6} m^{3} (810 acre⋅ft)
- Surface elevation: 1,900 m (6,200 ft)
- Settlements: Romanat

Gereb Shegal is a reservoir located in the Inderta woreda of the Tigray Region in Ethiopia. The earthen dam that holds the reservoir was built in 1998 by SAERT.

== Dam characteristics ==
- Dam height: 20 metres
- Dam crest length: 363 metres

== Capacity ==
- Original capacity: 1000000 m³
- Reservoir area: 17.1 ha

== Irrigation ==
- Designed irrigated area: 52 ha
- Actual irrigated area in 2002: 14 ha

== Environment ==
The catchment of the reservoir is 8.67 km² large, with a perimeter of 12.12 km and a length of 4320 metres. The reservoir suffers from rapid siltation. The lithology of the catchment is Mekelle Dolerite and Antalo Limestone. Part of the water that could be used for irrigation is lost through seepage; the positive side-effect is that this contributes to groundwater recharge.
