= Addi Amharay =

Lake in the Tigray Region of Ethiopia

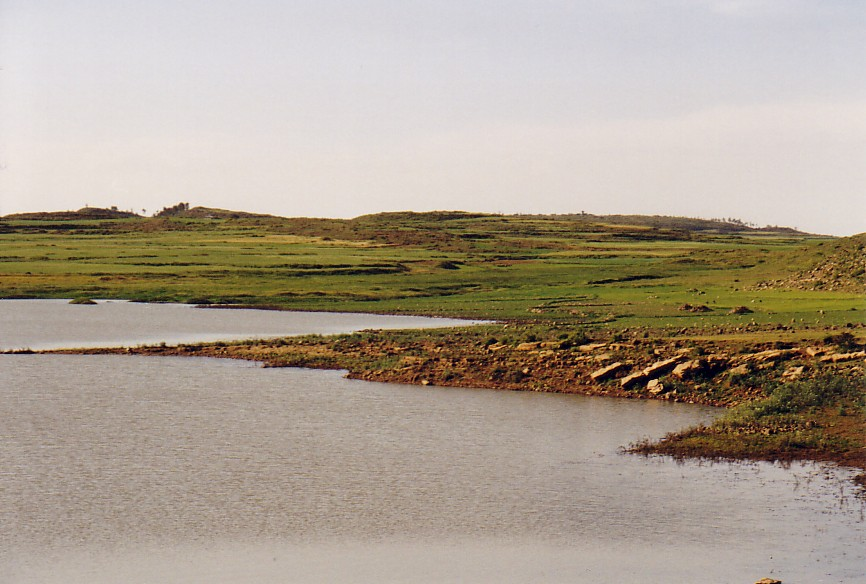

- Location within Ethiopia
- Coordinates: 13.40500132°N 39.5733461°E
- Type: Reservoir
- Basin countries: Ethiopia
- Surface area: 0.315 km^{2} (0.122 sq mi)
- Water volume: 0.957×10^{6} m^{3} (776 acre⋅ft)
- Surface elevation: 2,320 m (7,610 ft)
- Settlements: Kwiha

Addi Amharay is a reservoir located in the Inderta woreda of the Tigray Region in Ethiopia. The earthen dam that holds the reservoir was built in 1997 by SAERT.

== Dam characteristics ==
- Dam height: 14.7 metres
- Dam crest length: 128 metres
- Spillway width: 17 metres

== Capacity ==
- Original capacity: 957,000 m^{3}
- Dead storage: 175,000 m^{3}
- Reservoir area: 31.5 ha

In 2001, the life expectancy of the reservoir before it is filled with sediment was estimated at only 33 years.

== Irrigation ==
- Designed irrigated area: 60 ha
- Actual irrigated area in 2001: 5 ha

== Environment ==
The catchment of the reservoir is 4.92 km^{2}, with a perimeter of 9.62 km and a length of 3560 metres. The reservoir suffers from rapid siltation. The lithology of the catchment is Antalo Limestone and Agula shale. Part of the water that could be used for irrigation is lost through seepage; the positive side-effect is that this contributes to groundwater recharge.
