= Arato (reservoir) =

Reservoir in Ethiopia

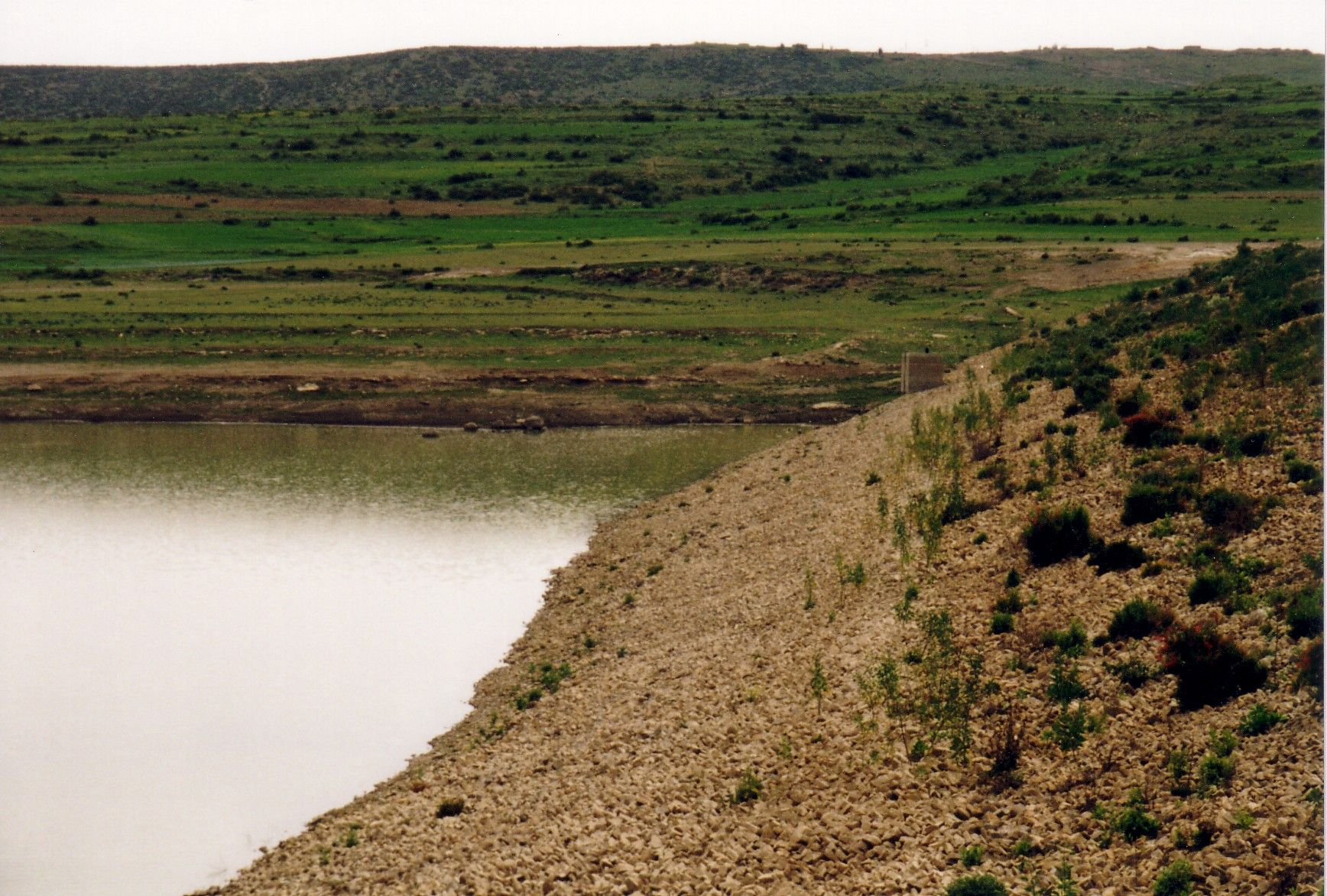

- Location within Ethiopia
- Coordinates: 13.51230068°N 39.64480822°E
- Type: Freshwater artificial lake
- Basin countries: Ethiopia
- Surface area: 0.4 km^{2} (0.15 sq mi)
- Water volume: 2.59×10^{6} m^{3} (2,100 acre⋅ft)
- Surface elevation: 2,400 m (7,900 ft)
- Settlements: Araguren

Arato is a reservoir located in the Inderta woreda of the Tigray Region in Ethiopia. The earthen dam that holds the reservoir was built in 1997 by SAERT.

== Dam characteristics ==
- Dam height: 20 metres
- Dam crest length: 443 metres
- Spillway width: 20 metres

== Capacity ==
- Original capacity: 2,590,000 m^{3}
- Dead storage: 647,698 m^{3}
- Reservoir area: 40 ha

== Irrigation ==
- Designed irrigated area: 120 ha
- Actual irrigated area in 2002: 27 ha

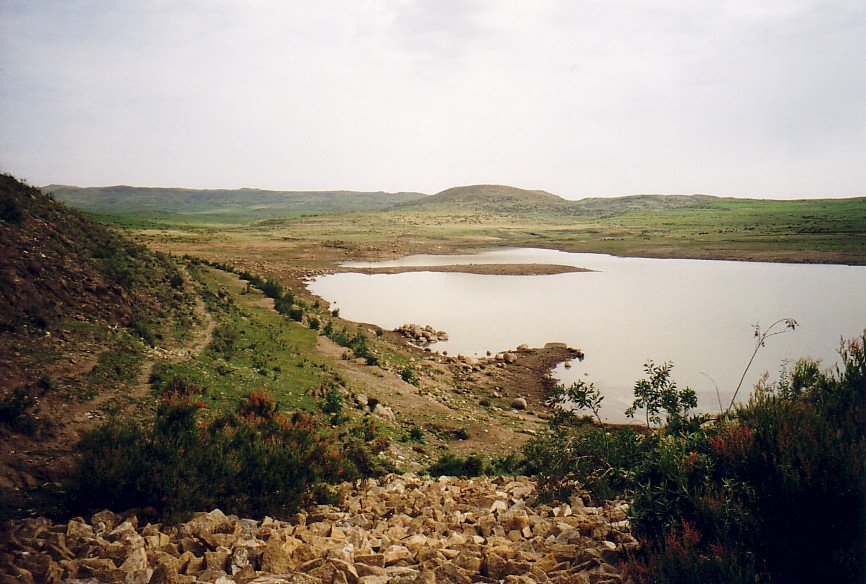

== Environment ==
The catchment of the reservoir is 12 square kilometres (4.6 sq mi) large, with a perimeter of 16 km (9.9 mi) and a length of 4,950 m (16,240 ft). The reservoir suffers from rapid siltation. The lithology of the catchment is Antalo Limestone and Mekelle Dolerite. Part of the water that could be used for irrigation is lost through seepage; the positive side-effect is that this contributes to groundwater recharge.
