= Gereb Bi'ati =

Gereb Bi’ati
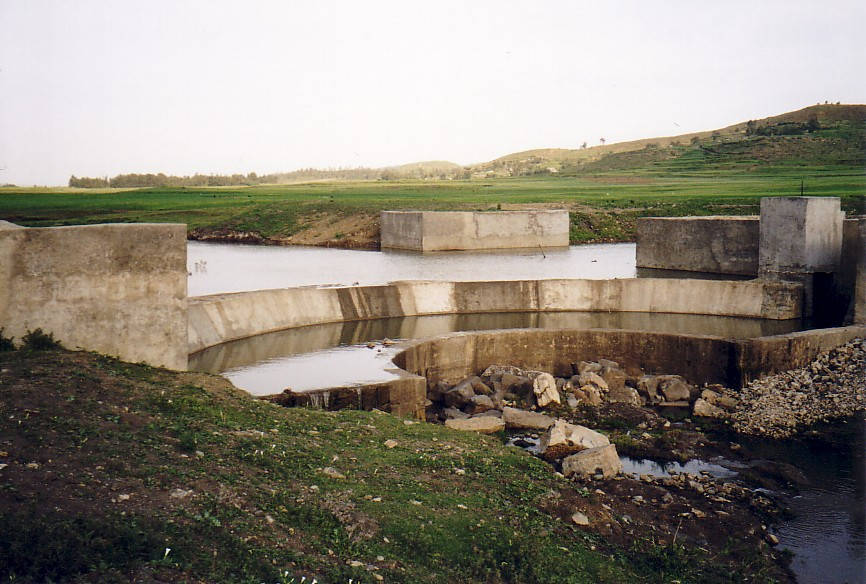

- Location within Ethiopia
- Coordinates: 13.44277614°N 39.4747198°E
- Type: Freshwater artificial lake
- Basin countries: Ethiopia
- Surface area: 0.17 km^{2} (0.066 sq mi)
- Water volume: 1.005841×10^{6} m^{3} (815.449 acre⋅ft)
- Surface elevation: 2,140 m (7,020 ft)
- Settlements: Mekelle

Gereb Bi’ati is a reservoir located near Mekelle in the Tigray Region in Ethiopia. The earthen dam that holds the reservoir was built in 2000 by SAERT.

== Dam characteristics ==
- Dam height: 17 metres
- Dam crest length: 578 metres
- Spillway width: 40 metres

== Capacity ==
- Original capacity: 1005841 m³
- Dead storage: 232728 m³
- Reservoir area: 17 ha
- Designed irrigated area: 88 ha

== Environment ==
The catchment of the reservoir is 9.71 km² large, with a perimeter of 14.24 km and a length of 4960 metres. Due to the possibility to by-pass sediment-laden water, the reservoir suffers from less rapid siltation. The lithology of the catchment is Agula Shale and Mekelle Dolerite. Part of the water that could be used for irrigation is lost through seepage; the positive side-effect is that this contributes to groundwater recharge.
