= Enderta (woreda) =

District in Tigray Region, Ethiopia

Coordinates: 13°30′N 39°40′E

Enderta እንደርታ
- Woreda
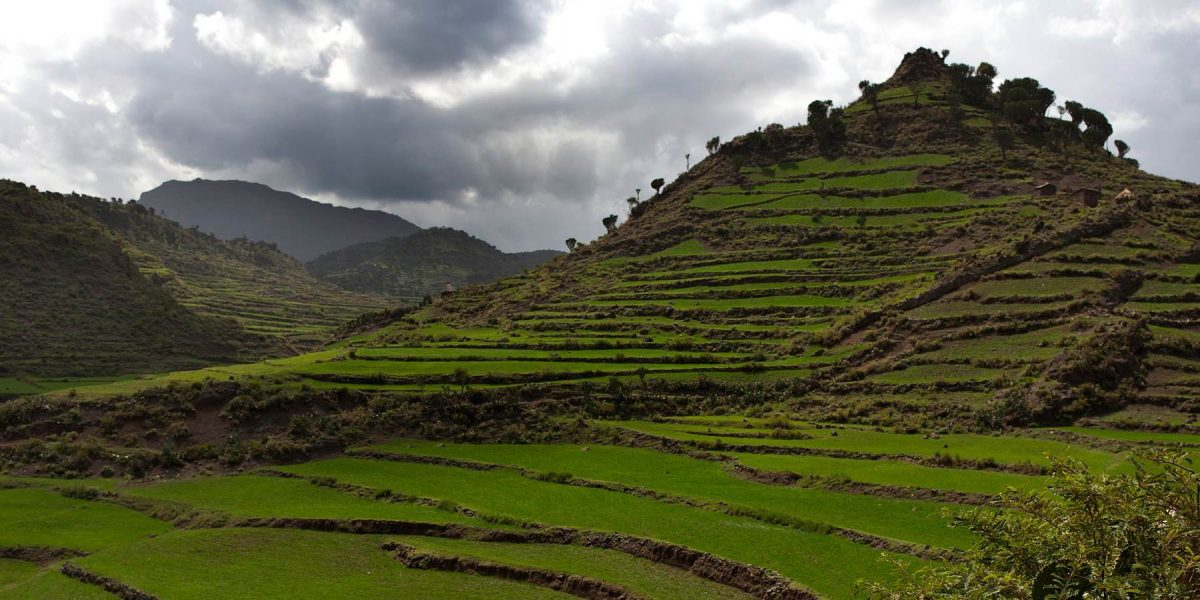
- Interactive map of Enderta
- Country: Ethiopia
- Region: Tigray
- Zone: Debub Misraqawi (Southeastern)

Area
  - Total: 3,175.31 km^{2} (1,225.99 sq mi)

Population (2007)
  - Total: 114,297

Enderta (Tigrinya: እንደርታ; also transliterated as ʾƎndärta) is one of the woredas in the Tigray Region of Ethiopia. It was named for the former Enderta province, which was later merged into Tigray Province. Located in the Debub Misraqawi (Southeastern) Zone at the eastern edge of the Ethiopian Highlands Enderta is bordered on the south by Hintalo Wajirat, on the west by Samre, on the northwest by the Mehakelegnaw (Central) Zone, on the north by the Misraqawi (Eastern) Zone, and on the east by the Afar Region; the city and special zone of Mek'ele is an enclave within Enderta. Towns in Enderta include Aynalem and Qwiha; the historic village of Chalacot is also located in this woreda.

At least one monolithic church is located in this woreda: a dedication to Mikael in the village of Zahero, which lies in the eastern part.

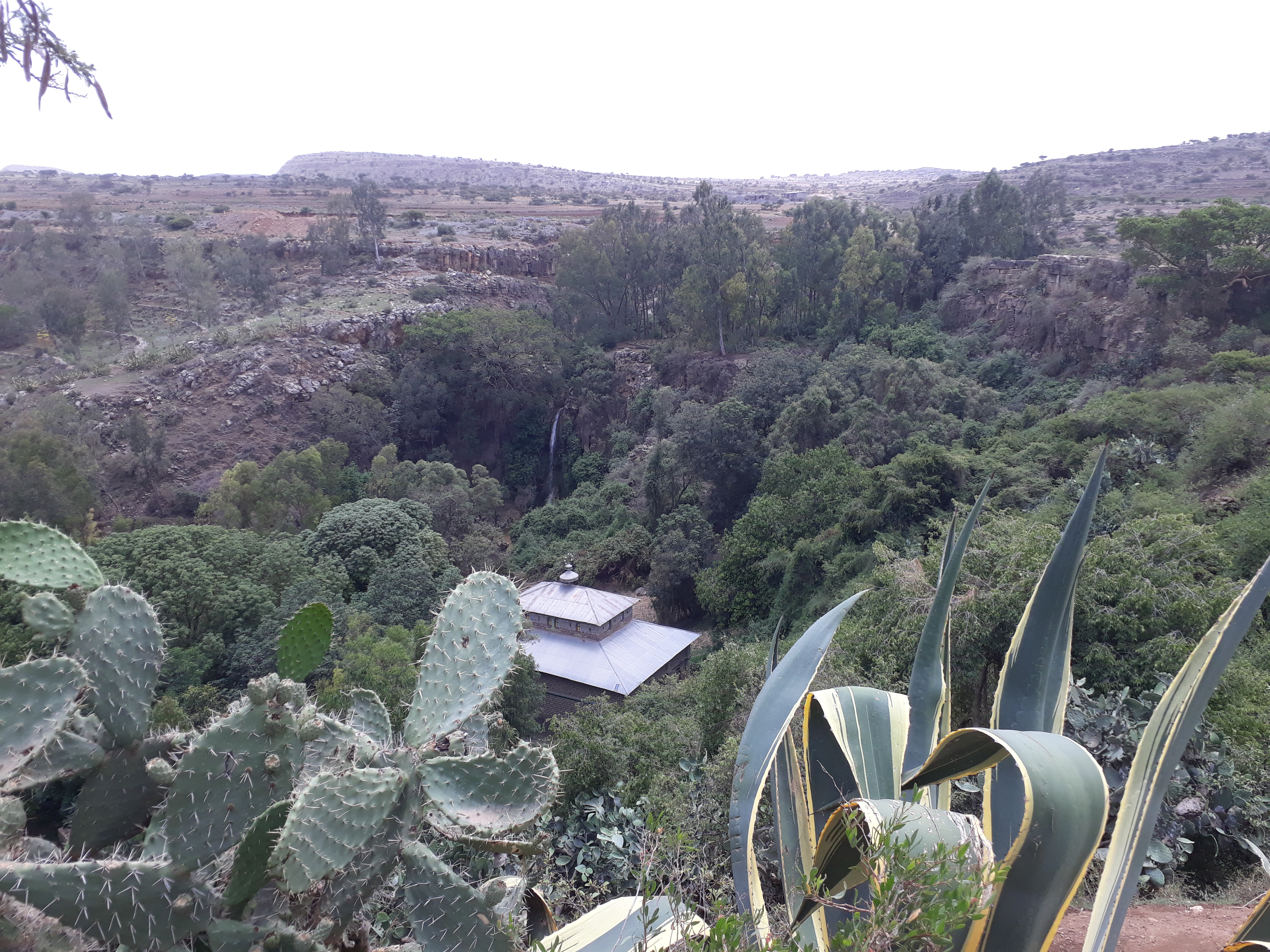
Maryam Bahrawti church forest in Mereb Mi'iti

== Demographics ==
Based on the 2007 national census conducted by the Central Statistical Agency of Ethiopia (CSA), this woreda has a total population of 114,297, an increase of 8.02% over the 1994 census, of whom 57,482 are men and 56,815 women; no urban inhabitants were reported. With an area of 3,175.31 square kilometers, Enderta has a population density of 36.00, which is less than the Zone average of 53.91 persons per square kilometer. A total of 24,618 households were counted in this woreda, resulting in an average of 4.64 persons to a household, and 23,856 housing units. 99.68% of the population said they were Orthodox Christians.

The 1994 national census reported a total population for this woreda of 105,814, of whom 51,871 were men and 53,943 were women; 12,375 or 11.7% of its population were urban dwellers. The largest ethnic group reported in Enderta was the Tigrayan (99.5%); all other ethnic groups made up 0.5% of the population. Tigrinya was spoken as a first language by 99.44%; the remaining 0.56% spoke all other primary languages reported. The overwhelming majority of the population, 99.32%, practiced Ethiopian Orthodox Christianity. Concerning education, 13.64% of the population were considered literate, which is less than the Zone average of 15.71%; 21.31% of children aged 7–12 were in primary school; 1.71% of the children aged 13–14 were in junior secondary school; 2.62% of the inhabitants aged 15–18 were in senior secondary school. Concerning sanitary conditions, about 90% of the urban houses and 29% of all houses had access to safe drinking water at the time of the census; about 29% of the urban and 6% of the total had toilet facilities.

== Agriculture ==
A sample enumeration performed by the CSA in 2001 interviewed 22,546 farmers in this woreda, who held an average of 1.22 hectares of land. Of the 27,421 hectares of private land surveyed, 95.37% was in cultivation, 0.36% pasture, 1.41% fallow, 0.3% woodland, and 2.56% was devoted to other uses. For the land under cultivation in this woreda, 85.11% was planted in cereals, 6.16% in pulses, 2.16% in oilseeds, and 35 hectares in vegetables. The area planted in fruit trees was 402 hectares, while 16 were planted in gesho. 74.42% of the farmers both raised crops and livestock, while 23.08% only grew crops and 2.51% only raised livestock. Land tenure in this woreda is distributed amongst 81.93% owning their land, and 15.89% renting; the number held in other forms of tenure is missing.

== Reservoirs ==
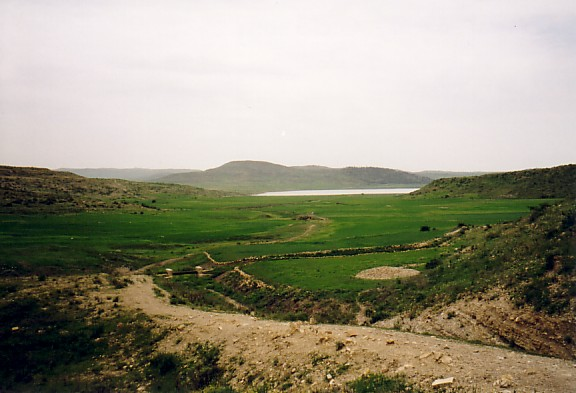
Chichat (from Inda Zib'i)

In this district with rains that last only for a couple of months per year, reservoirs of different sizes allow harvesting runoff from the rainy season for further use in the dry season. The reservoirs of the district include:

- Addi Akhor
- Addi Amharay
- Addi Hilo
- Arato
- Chichat
- Hiza'iti Wedi Cheber
- Imbagedo
- Inda Zib'i

- Era Quhila
- Gereb Bi'ati
- Gereb Awso
- Gereb Segen (May Gabat)
- the larger Lake Giba (under construction)
- Gereb Shegal
- Godew

Overall, these reservoirs suffer from rapid siltation. Part of the water that could be used for irrigation is lost through seepage; the positive side-effect is that this contributes to groundwater recharge.

== 2020 woreda reorganisation ==
Around 2020, woreda Inderta's boundaries became modified:

- large parts near Mekelle were included in the Mekelle woreda
- the limestone areas, west of Giba river, were transferred from Dogu'a Tembien to Inderta

== Churches and monasteries ==
As of 2013, 106 church institutions were registered in the woreda. Churches and monasteries in the woreda that contain historical manuscripts and artefacts include:

- Dǝrba Däbrä ʾAbunä Yasay
- Koholo Däbrä Gälila Däbrä Betel Qǝddus Yoḥannǝs Mäṭmǝq
- May ʾAnbäsa Däbrä Gännät Kidanä Mǝḥrät gädam / ʾƎnda Mäḥṣun gädam
