= Hiza'iti Wedi Cheber =

Hiza’iti Wedi Cheber
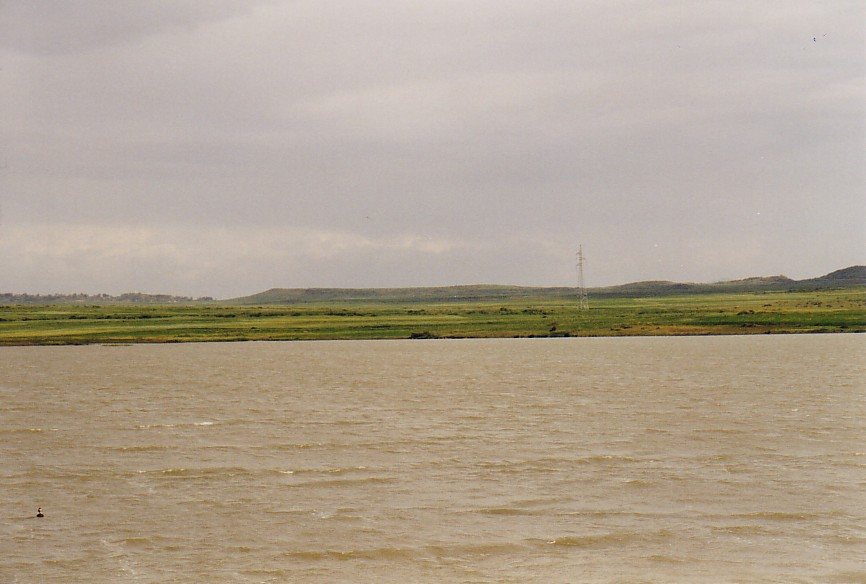

- Location within Ethiopia
- Coordinates: 13.363202°N 39.543074°E
- Type: Freshwater artificial lake
- Basin countries: Ethiopia
- Water volume: 1.24×10^{6} m^{3} (1,010 acre⋅ft)
- Surface elevation: 2,230 m (7,320 ft)
- Settlements: Mereb Mi’iti

Hiza’iti Wedi Cheber is a reservoir located in the Inderta woreda of the Tigray Region in Ethiopia. The earthen dam that holds the reservoir was built in 1997 by the Tigray Bureau of Agriculture and Natural Resources.

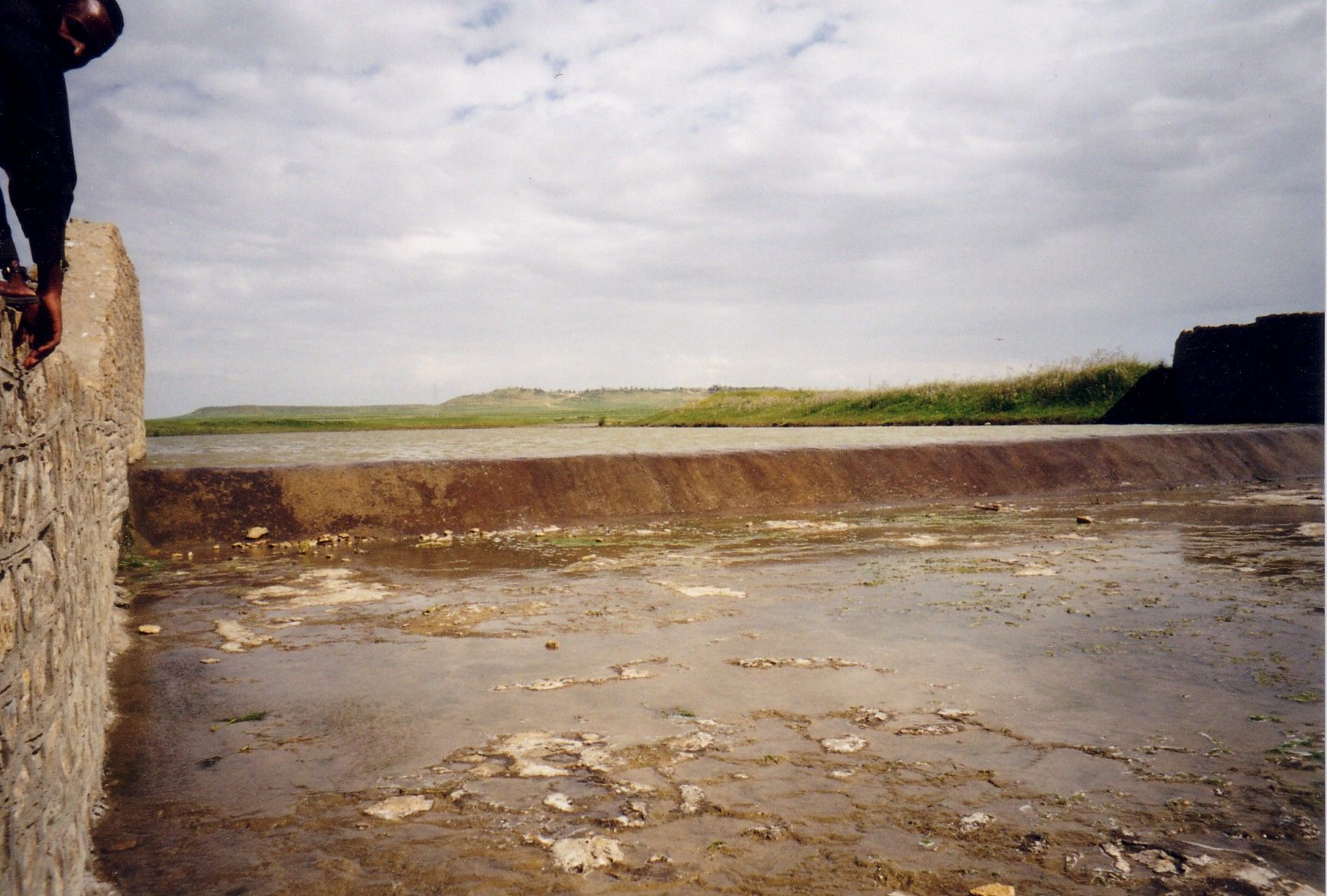
Hiza'iti Wedi Cheber (spillway)

== Dam characteristics ==
- Dam height: 14.5 metres
- Dam crest length: 598 metres
- Spillway width: 30 metres
- Original capacity: 1 240 000 m³
- Designed irrigated area: 80 ha
- Actual irrigated area in 2002: 50 ha

== Environment ==
The catchment of the reservoir is 33 km² large, with a perimeter of 24.6 km and a length of 6910 metres. The reservoir suffers from rapid siltation. The lithology of the catchment is Antalo Limestone and Mekelle Dolerite. Part of the water that could be used for irrigation is lost through seepage; the positive side-effect is that this contributes to groundwater recharge. Actually the whole valley bottom down to Chelekwot benefits from this seepage water, that emerges in various springs and is particularly used for irrigation agriculture.
