= Qwiha =

Kwiha
- Flag

- Location within Ethiopia
- Coordinates: 13°29′N 39°38′E
- Country: Ethiopia
- Region: Tigray
- Zone: Debub Misraqawi (south-eastern)
- Woreda: Enderta
- Elevation: 2,247 m (7,372 ft)

Population (2005)
  - Total: 12,543
- Time zone: UTC+3 (EAT)

Kwiha (in Italian colonial spelling Quiha, in recent years by some writers misunderstood as Qwiha without any basis in local spelling and pronunciation) is a town located in Tigray Regional State, Ethiopia. Quiha has the biggest airport in Tigray which is called Alula Aba Nega airport. The name comes from the local word for willows, which are abundant in the area. Located in the Debub Misraqawi (south-eastern) Zone of the Tigray Regional State, it lies 9 kilometers east of Mekelle straddling Ethiopian Highway 2 which leads to Addis Ababa. It has a latitude and longitude of 13°28′37″N 39°32′42″E with an elevation of 2247 meters above sea level.

== History ==
=== Antiquity ===
The hill of Kwiha Cherqos located on the eastern fringe of the modern city was settled during the Aksumite Period and hosted monumental buildings, possibly including a church. Monumental stone pillars typical of the Aksumite architecture can be seen near the new church at the summit of the hill.

=== Medieval Period ===
A Muslim community is attested in Kwiha between the 10th and 13th century through Arabic funerary stelae discovered in the field known as Bilet, east of the tell of Kwiha Cerqos.

=== 19th century ===
On the northern edge of town are ruins, including a set of monolithic pillars. The ruins were first described by Nathaniel Pearce in the early 19th century, which included the presence of inscriptions. he also mentions the presence of a sacred spring whose waters "afflicted with disease resort from far and near to bathe." There is also a tradition that the ruins were part of a church dedicated to saint Cyriakos (in Ethiopia known as Qirqos respectively Chirqos/Cherqos) and destroyed by Imam Ahmad ibn Ibrahim al-Ghazi. Although no other remains of this structure has been recorded, a more recent church stands nearby and "grave digging has exposed rough walls and possibly Aksumite pottery."

=== 20th century ===
The Guida dell'Africa orientale Italiana describes Kwiha in 1938, during the Italian occupation, as having a small Italian settlement below the center of town, and little north of the pass a small church of San Francesco da Páola built by an Italian military unit. In 1938, there were shops, five restaurants and Hotel-Restaurant “Romagnolo” in Kwiha. There was also a car service station and an airport. The town was occupied by the Woyane during their rebellion against the Ethiopian government in late 1943.

Kwiha had telephone service at least as early as 1956, when it is reported that the only hotel in town had the only telephone.

== Transportation ==
Kwiha is the administrative center of the Enderta woreda.

The airport of Mekelle, Alula Aba Nega Airport is located within the administrative boundaries of Kwiha. In Kwiha, the (main) paved road from Addis Ababa takes a sharp turn left to Mek'ele. The recently asphalted old road to Asmara, which used to bear the "National road n°1" label, keeps heading north to the village of Maymegden and Wukro.

A local road starts in Kwiha linking the eastern tabias of Arato and Dergajen to the woreda center. Seven kilometers south of Kwiha a regional road heading to Shiket and the Afar Region diverts from the national highway.

== Demographics ==
In 1938, the town counted approximately 900 inhabitants (including 60 Italians). Based on figures from the Central Statistical Agency in 2005, Qwiha has an estimated total population of 12,543, of whom 5,644 were males and 6,899 were females. The 1994 census reported it had a total population of 9,867 of whom 4,336 were males and 5,531 were females. It is one of two towns in Enderta woreda.
