= Addi Qenafiz =

Reservoir in Ethiopia

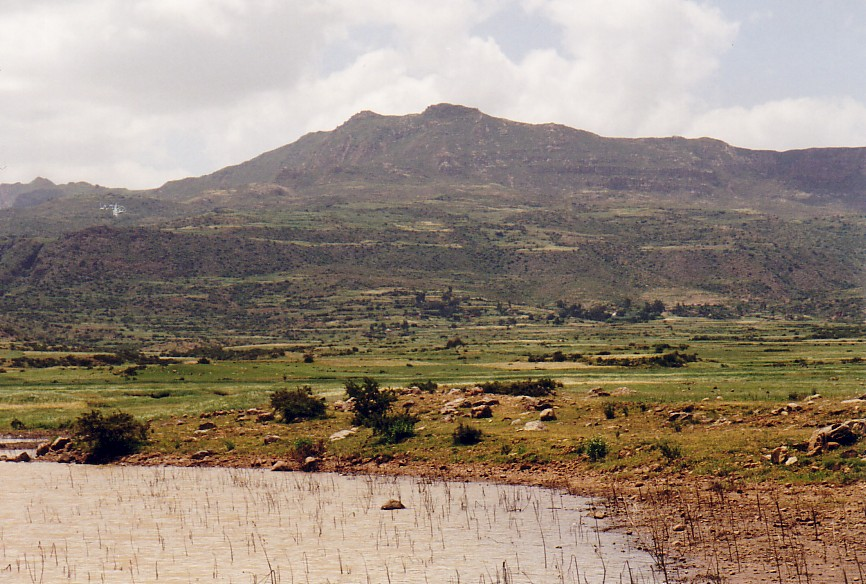

- Location within Ethiopia
- Coordinates: 13.25411779°N 39.40795418°E
- Type: Freshwater artificial lake
- Basin countries: Ethiopia
- Surface area: 0.1286 km^{2} (0.0497 sq mi)
- Water volume: 0.67×10^{6} m^{3} (540 acre⋅ft)
- Surface elevation: 2,120 m (6,960 ft)
- Settlements: Hintalo

Addi Qenafiz is a reservoir located in the Hintalo Wajirat woreda of the Tigray Region in Ethiopia. The earthen dam that holds the reservoir was built in 1998 by SAERT.

== Dam characteristics ==
- Dam height: 15.5 metres
- Dam crest length: 514 metres
- Spillway width: 10 metres

== Capacity ==
- Original capacity: 670 480 m^{3}
- Dead storage: 60953 m^{3}
- Reservoir area: 12.86 ha

In 2002, the life expectancy of the reservoir (the duration before it is filled with sediment) was estimated at 31 years.

== Irrigation ==
- Designed irrigated area: 60 ha
- Actual irrigated area in 2002: 7 ha

== Environment ==
The catchment of the reservoir is 14.18 km^{2} large, with a perimeter of 17 km and a length of 5360 metres. The reservoir suffers from rapid siltation. The geology of the catchment is Mekelle Dolerite, Agula Shale, and, at the upper edge, the Amba Aradam Formation. Part of the water that could be used for irrigation is lost through seepage; the positive side-effect is that this contributes to groundwater recharge.
