= SAERT =

Organization that constructed micro-dams in Ethiopia

Sustainable Agriculture and Environmental Rehabilitation in Tigray (SAERT) was a parastatal organisation in the Tigray Region of Ethiopia. It was established in 1995 for "policymaking, design and construction of dams and canals, and the maintenance of dams and water distribution systems". SAERT was funded jointly by the United Nations Development Programme, United Nations Economic Commission for Africa and Food and Agriculture Organization of the United Nations, with the Regional Government of Tigray sharing project financing in kind. It started as a project but it was later established as a commission (co-SAERT). The first project manager was Leul Kahsay who later became deputy commissioner. Abay Tsehaye was the first commissioner appointed by the Regional government.

Initially, SAERT planned on small-scale irrigation projects in the Region through constructions of 500 earthen micro-dams in ten years. In the first year construction work started at four sites: Gum Selasa dam near Adi Gudem, Korir dam near Wukro, Dura dam near Aksum and Meskebet dam near Adi Daero. After evaluating the resources required for the construction of each dam and realizing that the goal was too large, the plan was changed to concentrate on drought-prone districts of Atsbi Wenberta, Enderta, Hintalo Wajirat and Saharti Samre. By 2003, SAERT had only constructed 54 dams. Due to several factors, many of the ponds and reservoirs became inoperable; those that remain suffer from heavy siltation and seepage.

In the Ilala and Kalamino Basins, SAERT constructed dams at Hashenge, Mai Serakit, Da Zeb'oy, Arato, Gereb Shegal, Sewhi Meda, Era Quhila, Gereb Awso and Addi Hilo. Also constructed was Addi Akhor, Addi Qenafiz, Gereb Segen (Hintalo) and Ginda'i.

Other earthen dams and reservoirs constructed by SAERT include Addi Amharay, Addi Gela, Addi Shihu, Betqua, Dur Anbesa, Era (reservoir), Filiglig, Gereb Awso, Gereb Bi'ati, Gereb Mihiz, Imbagedo and Inda Zib'i.
