= Ilala River =

River in the Tigray highlands of Ethiopia

Ilala
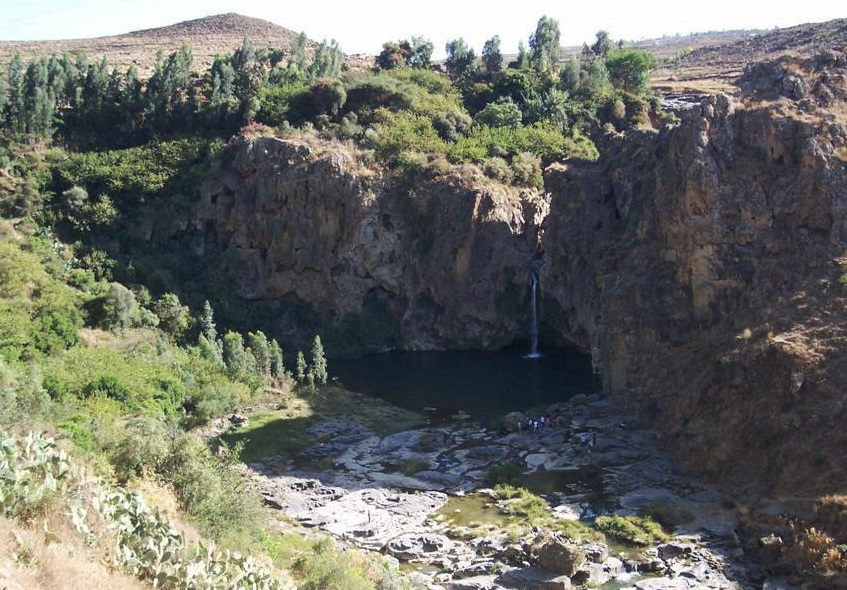
- The Ilala River at Romanat

- Ilala River in Tigray Region

Location
- Country: Ethiopia
- Region: Tigray Region
- Districts (woreda): Inderta

Physical characteristics
- Source: Chichat
  - location: Dergajen
  - elevation: 2,376 m (7,795 ft)
- Mouth: Giba River
  - location: Qarano in Addi Azmera
  - coordinates: 13.591°N 39.377°E
  - elevation: 1,740 m (5,710 ft)
- Length: 46 km (29 mi)
- Basin size: 341 km^{2} (132 mi^{2})
- Width
  - average: 25 m (82 ft)
- Discharge
  - location: Confluence to Giba River
  - maximum: 259 m^{3}/s (9,100 cu ft/s)

Basin features
- Progression: Giba→ Tekezé→ Atbarah→ Nile→ Mediterranean Sea
- River system: Permanent river
- Landmarks: Mekelle City
- Waterbodies: Chichat, Inda Zib'i, Arato
- Waterfalls: Romanat
- Bridges: Mekelle, Kwiha
- Topography: Mountains and deep gorges

The Ilala is a river of northern Ethiopia. Rising in the mountains of Dergajen (2,676 metres above sea level), it flows westward to Giba River which empties finally in the Tekezé River.

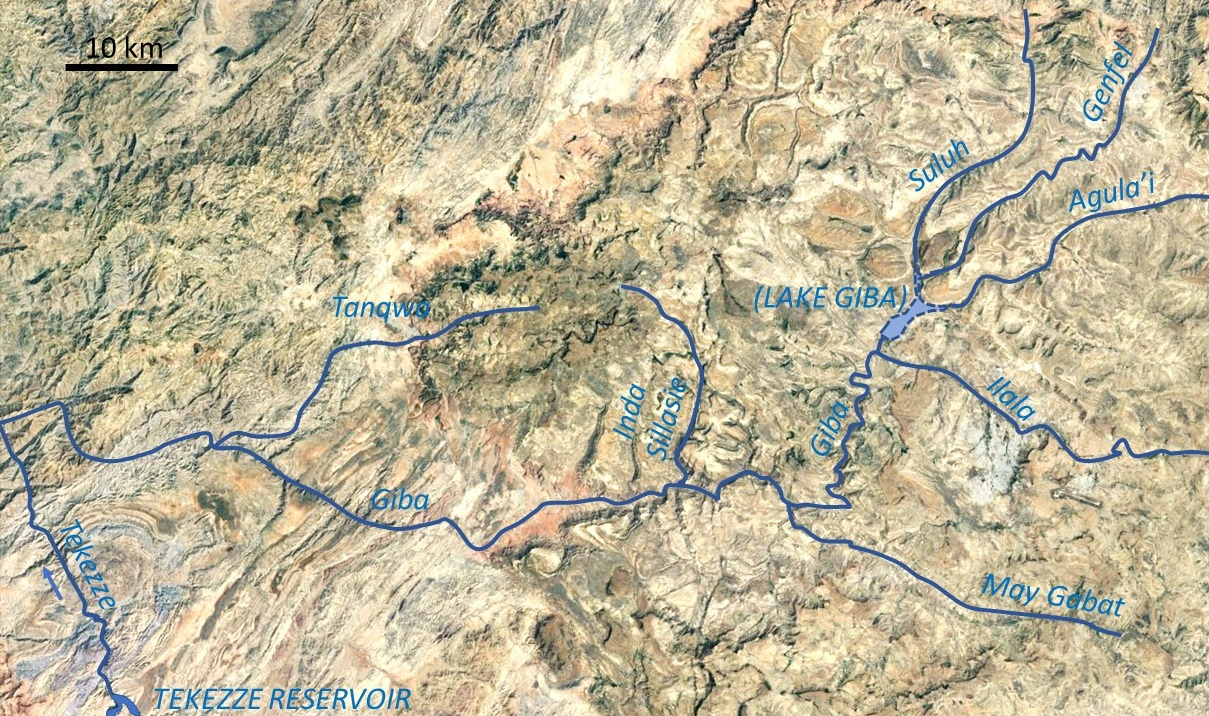
Giba drainage network

== Hydrography ==
It is a confined river, locally meandering in its narrow alluvial plain, with a slope gradient of 14 metres per kilometre. With its tributaries, the river has cut a deep gorge.

== Hydrology ==
=== Hydrological characteristics ===
The runoff footprint or annual total runoff volume is 48,000,000 m³. Peak discharges up to 259 m³ per second occur in the second part of the rainy season (month of August) when there are strong rains and the soils are saturated with water in many places. The percentage of total rainfall that directly leaves the catchment as storm runoff (also called runoff coefficient) is 14%.

The total amount of sediment that is transported by this river amounts to 222,000 tonnes per year. Median sediment concentration in the river water is 2.45 grammes per litre, but may go up to 62 g/L. The highest sediment concentrations occur at the beginning of the rainy season, when loose soil and dust is washed away by overland flow and ends up in the river. As such water contains many nutrients (locally it is called "aygi"), farmers estimate that it strengthens their cattle, which they will bring to the river. All in all, average sediment yield is 878 tonnes per km² and per year. All measurements were done at a purposively installed station near the mouth of the river, in the years 2004–2007.

=== Flash floods ===
Runoff mostly occurs in the form of high runoff discharge events that occur in a very short period (called flash floods). These are related to the steep topography, often little vegetation cover and intense convective rainfall. The peaks of such flash floods have often a 50 to 100 times larger discharge than the preceding baseflow. These flash floods mostly occur during the evening or night, because the convective rain showers occur in the afternoon.

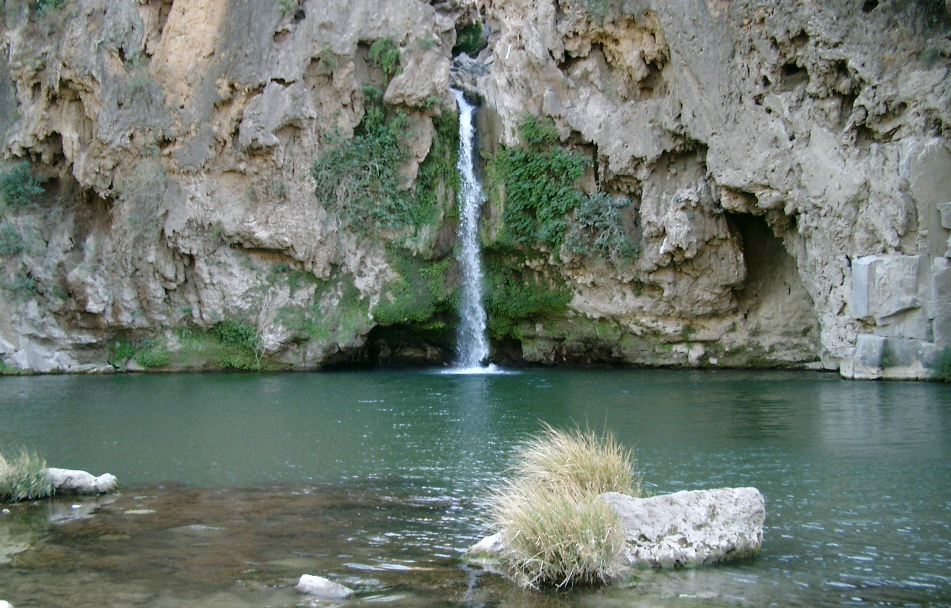
Romanat waterfall on Ilala River

=== Changes over time ===
Evidence given by Italian aerial photographs of the catchment, taken in the 1930s show that 36% of the catchment was covered with woody vegetation (against 20% in 2014). This vegetation could slow down runoff and the runoff coefficient was smaller (12% in 1935 against 14% in 2014). As a consequence, discharges in the river were less and the river was narrower than today. Up to the 1980s, there was strong pressure on the environment, and much vegetation disappeared. This river had its greatest discharges and width in that period. The magnitude of floods in this river has however been decreased in recent years due to interventions in the catchment. On steep slopes, exclosures have been established; the dense vegetation largely contributes to enhanced infiltration, less flooding and better baseflow. Physical conservation structures such as stone bunds and check dams also intercept runoff.

== Irrigated agriculture ==
Besides springs and reservoirs, irrigation is strongly dependent on the river's baseflow. Such irrigated agriculture is important in meeting the demands for food security and poverty reduction. Irrigated lands are established in the narrow alluvial plains all along the river, mainly through use of pump irrigation.

== Boulders and pebbles in the river bed ==
Boulders and pebbles encountered in the river bed can originate from any location higher up in the catchment. In the uppermost stretches of the river, only rock fragments of the upper lithological units will be present in the river bed, whereas more downstream one may find a more comprehensive mix of all lithologies crossed by the river. From upstream to downstream, the following lithological units occur in the catchment.

- Agula Shale
- Mekelle Dolerite
- Antalo Limestone
- Quaternary freshwater tufa

== See also ==
- List of Ethiopian rivers
