= Addi Gela =

Reservoir in Ethiopia

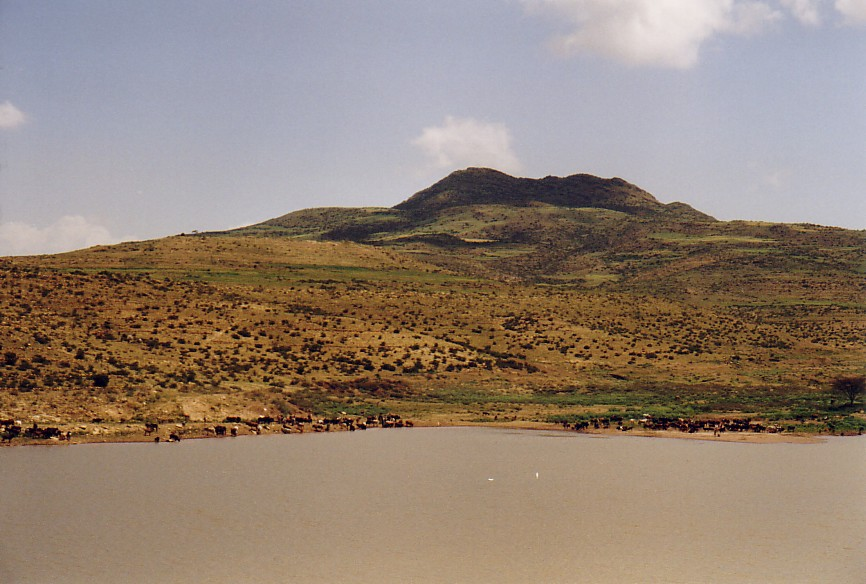

- Location within Ethiopia
- Coordinates: 13.12925976°N 39.50988014°E
- Type: Freshwater artificial lake
- Basin countries: Ethiopia
- Surface area: 0.185 km^{2} (0.071 sq mi)
- Water volume: 1.25×10^{6} m^{3} (1,010 acre⋅ft)
- Surface elevation: 2,040 m (6,690 ft)
- Settlements: Hiwane

Addi Gela is a reservoir located in the Hintalo Wajirat woreda of the Tigray Region in Ethiopia. The earthen dam that holds the reservoir was built in 1998 by SAERT.

== Dam characteristics ==
- Dam height: 22 metres
- Dam crest length: 424 metres
- Spillway width: 14 metres

== Capacity ==
- Original capacity: 1 250 000 m^{3}
- Dead storage: 62 500 m^{3}
- Reservoir area: 18.5 ha

In 2002, the life expectancy of the reservoir (the duration before it is filled with sediment) was estimated at 40 years.

== Irrigation ==
- Designed irrigated area: 100 ha
- Actual irrigated area in 2002: 6 ha

== Environment ==
The catchment of the reservoir is 8.19 km^{2} large, with a perimeter of 13.43 km and a length of 5640 metres. The reservoir suffers from rapid siltation. The lithology of the catchment is Agula Shale, Mekelle Dolerite, and sandstone of the Amba Aradam Formation. Part of the water that could be used for irrigation is lost through seepage; the positive side-effect is that this contributes to groundwater recharge.
