= Dur Anbesa =

- Location within Ethiopia Location within Africa
- Coordinates: 13°16′47″N 39°27′35″E
- Type: Freshwater artificial lake
- Basin countries: Ethiopia
- Surface area: 0.14 km^{2} (0.054 sq mi)
- Water volume: 0.9×10^{6} m^{3} (730 acre⋅ft)
- Settlements: Hintalo

Dur Anbesa is a reservoir located in the Hintalo Wajirat woreda of the Tigray Region in Ethiopia. The earthen dam that holds the reservoir was built in 2001 by SAERT. The catchment of the reservoir is 10 km^{2} large. The reservoir suffers from rapid siltation. Part of the water that could be used for irrigation is lost through seepage; the positive side-effect is that this contributes to groundwater recharge.

== Dam characteristics ==
- Dam height: 18 metres
- Dam crest length: 605 metres
- Spillway width: 10 metres

=== Capacity ===
- Original capacity: 900 000 m³
- Dead storage: 115 598 m³
- Reservoir area: 14 ha

In 2002, the life expectancy of the reservoir (the duration before it is filled with sediment) was estimated at 36 years.

=== Irrigation ===
- Designed irrigated area: 61 ha
