= Gereb Segen =

Gereb Segen may refer to:

- Gereb Segen (May Gabat)
- Gereb Segen (Hintalo)
