= Adi Gudem =

Adi Gudem Adigudem
- Flag

- Location within Ethiopia
- Coordinates: 13°15′N 39°31′E
- Country: Ethiopia
- Region: Tigray
- Zone: Debub Misraqawi Zone
- District: Hintalo Wajirat
- Elevation: 2,100 m (6,900 ft)
- Time zone: UTC+3 (EAT)

Adi Gudem (Tigrigna: ዓዲጉደም) is a town in Tigray, Ethiopia. Located in the Debub Misraqawi (Southeastern) Zone of the Tigray Region (or kilil), this town has a latitude and longitude of 13°15′N 39°31′E with an elevation of 2100 meters above sea level. It is one of the larger settlements in the Hintalo Wajirat district. Adi Gudem is located along Ethiopian Highway 2.
