= Gereb Mihiz =

Reservoir in the Tigray Region of Ethiopia

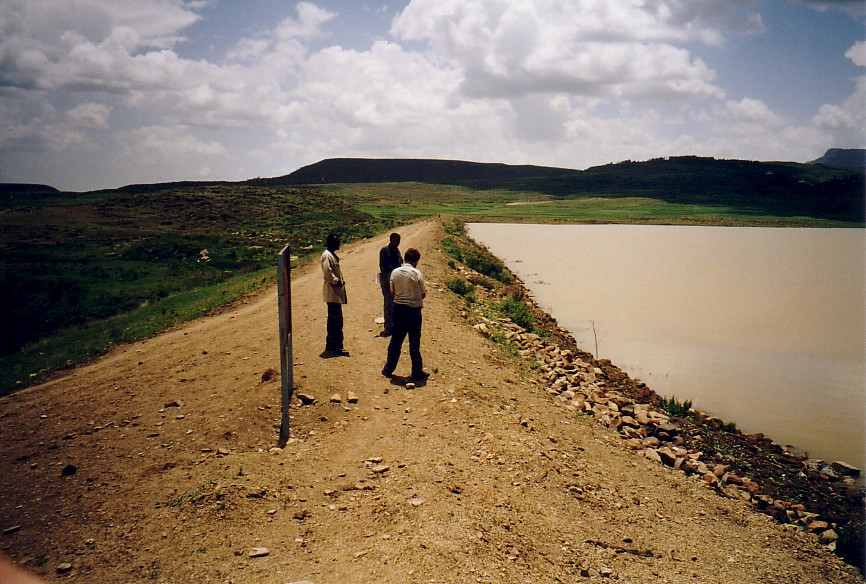

- Location within Ethiopia
- Coordinates: 13.29464441°N 39.47134646°E
- Type: Freshwater artificial lake
- Basin countries: Ethiopia
- Surface area: 0.3 km^{2} (0.12 sq mi)
- Water volume: 1.3×10^{6} m^{3} (1,100 acre⋅ft)
- Surface elevation: 2,110 m (6,920 ft)
- Settlements: Hintalo

Gereb Mihiz is a reservoir located in the Hintalo Wajirat woreda of the Tigray Region in Ethiopia. The earthen dam that holds the reservoir was built in 1998 by SAERT.

== Dam characteristics ==
- Dam height: 17.5 metres
- Dam crest length: 403 metres
- Spillway width: 15 metres

== Capacity ==
- Original capacity: 1300000 m³
- Dead storage: 325000 m³
- Reservoir area: 30 ha

In 2002, the life expectancy of the reservoir (the duration before it is filled with sediment) was estimated at 21 years.

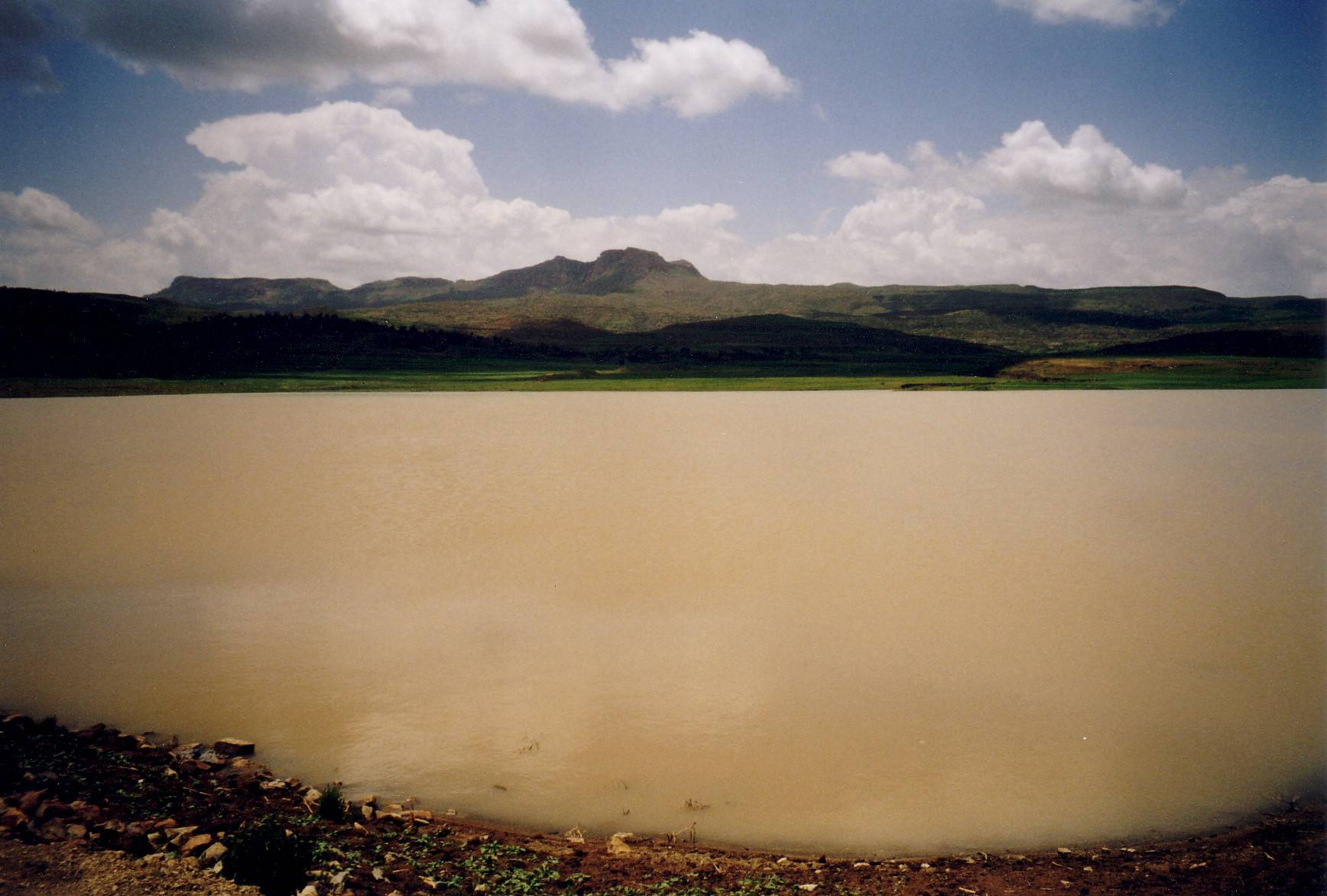
Gereb Mihiz

== Irrigation ==
- Designed irrigated area: 80 ha
- Actual irrigated area in 2002: 38 ha

== Environment ==
The catchment of the reservoir is 17.16 km² large, with a perimeter of 20.38 km and a length of 4910 metres. The reservoir suffers from rapid siltation. The lithology of the catchment is Mekelle Dolerite and Agula Shale. Part of the water that could be used for irrigation is lost through seepage; the positive side-effect is that this contributes to groundwater recharge.
