= Hintalo Wajirat =

Coordinates: 13°10′N 39°40′E

Hintalo Wajirat ሒንጣሎ ወጀራት
- Woreda
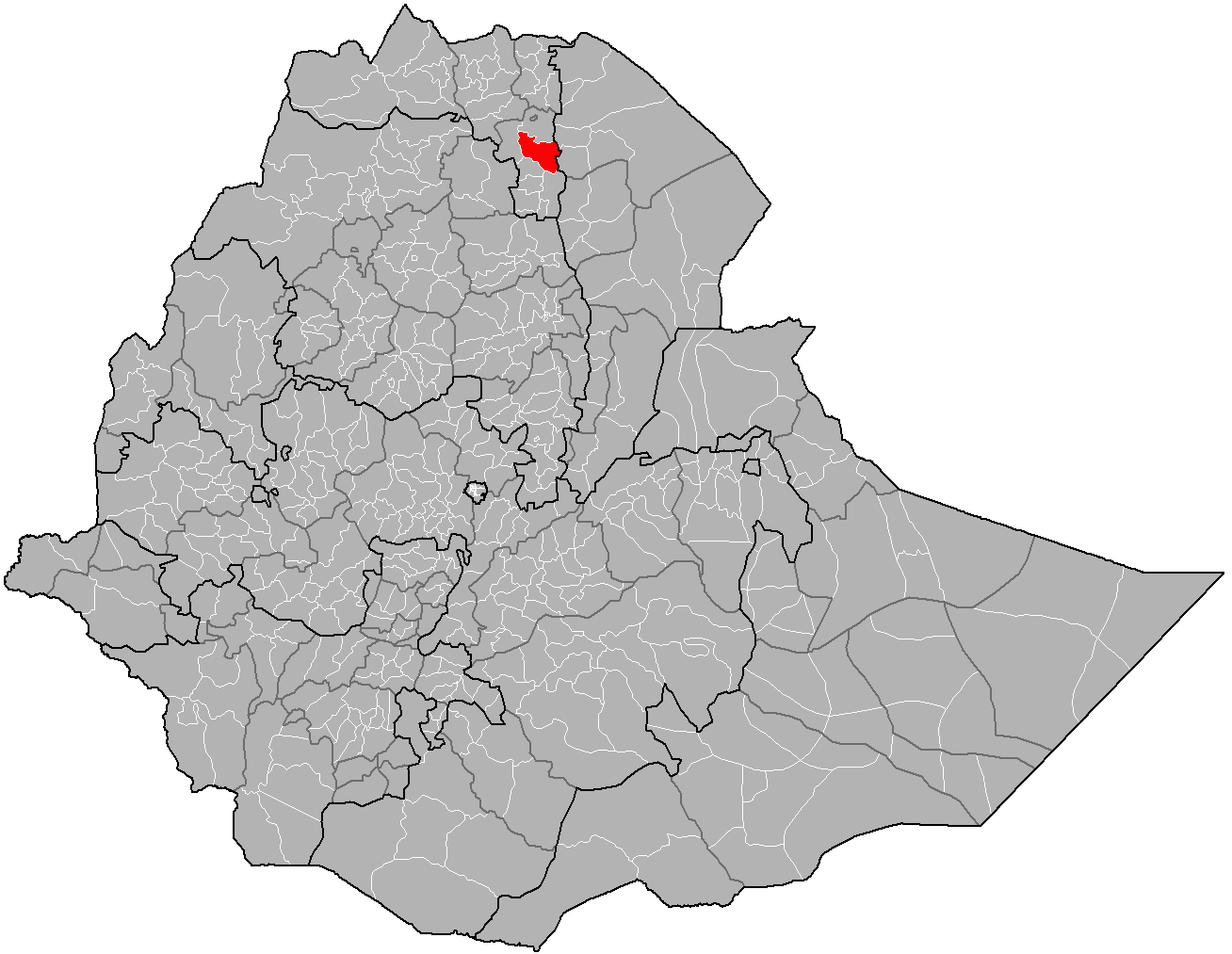
- Country: Ethiopia
- Region: Tigray
- Zone: Debub Misraqawi (Southeastern)

Area
  - Total: 2,864.79 km^{2} (1,106.10 sq mi)

Population (2007)
  - Total: 153,505

Hintalo Wajirat (Tigrinya: ሒንጣሎ ወጀራት) is one of the Districts of Ethiopia or woredas in the Tigray Region of Ethiopia. It is named after its largest town, Hintalo, and the Wajirat Mountains in the southern part of the woreda. Located in the Debub Misraqawi (Southeastern) Zone at the eastern edge of the Ethiopian Highlands Hintalo Wajirat is bordered on the south by the Debubawi (Southern) Zone, on the west by Samre, on the north by Enderta, and on the east by the Afar Region. Other towns in Hintalo Wajirat include Adi Gudem, and Bahri Tseba.

== History ==
Hintalo (ሕንጣሎ) has been the capital city of Gabat-Milash woreda (ጋባት ምላሽ) as well as the capital city of Enderta province, with Wajirat (ወጀራት) itself being a historical district of the province of Enderta, Wajirat's historical capital city was Debub (ደቡብ). The current Hintalo Wajirat woreda is the merger of Gabat Milash and Wajirat, and both Gabatmilash as well as Wajirat have been an integral part of Enderta province when Enderta was an independent province as well as an awraja as recent as the late 1990s,

As of early 2020, woreda Hintalo-Wajirat became inoperative and its territory belongs to the following new woredas:

- Hintalo (new, smaller, woreda)
- Wajirat woreda
- Adi Gudom town

== Overview ==
High points in this woreda include Amba Aradam, an amba or mountain north of Hintalo. Rivers include the Samre, which rises in Hintalo Wajirat. Local points of interest include the church of Mariam Nazara, built on ruins which local tradition asserts was a palace of 44 chambers built by Emperor Amda Seyon. The remaining ten rock-pillars and four chambers with roofs made of oval-shaped brick attest to the splendid nature of the building in its heyday.

On 7 May 2009, the Ethiopian Electric Power Corporation and the French Agence Française de Développement signed a financing agreement amounting to 210 million Euros to build the Ashegoda Wind Power Project, located 20 kilometers southwest of Mekelle. This plant would have an installation capacity of 120 MW, along with an annual energy production of 400 to 450 GwH. The project timeline stated that the first phase would take 16 months to complete and yield 30 MW, while the entire project, which will be in three phases, would be finalized in 36 months. The project was completed at the end of October, 2013. Wind farm has 84 turbines with capacity of 120 MW making it biggest wind farm of Ethiopia.

== Demographics ==
Based on the 2007 national census conducted by the Central Statistical Agency of Ethiopia (CSA), this woreda has a total population of 153,505, an increase of 38.39% over the 1994 census, of whom 75,890 are men and 77,615 women; 11,936 or 7.78% are urban inhabitants. With an area of 2,864.79 square kilometers, Hintalo Wajirat has a population density of 53.58, which is greater than the Zone average of 53.91 persons per square kilometer. A total of 34,360 households were counted in this woreda, resulting in an average of 4.47 persons to a household, and 33,130 housing units. 98.84% of the population said they were Orthodox Christians, and 1.14% were Muslim.

The 1994 national census reported a total population for this woreda of 110,926, of whom 54,601 were men and 56,325 were women; 9,903 or 8.93% of its population were urban dwellers. The largest ethnic group reported in Hintalo Wajirat was the Tigrayan (99.79%); all other ethnic groups made up 0.21% of the population. Tigrinya was spoken as a first language by 99.8%; the remaining 0.2% spoke all other primary languages reported. 98.58% of the population practiced Ethiopian Orthodox Christianity, and 1.39% were Muslim. Concerning education, 9.12% of the population were considered literate, which is less than the Zone average of 15.71%; 10.59% of children aged 7–12 were in primary school; 0.63% of the children aged 13–14 were in junior secondary school; and 0.19% of the inhabitants aged 15–18 were in senior secondary school. Concerning sanitary conditions, about 69% of the urban houses and 14% of all houses had access to safe drinking water at the time of the census; about 7% of the urban and about 3% of the total had toilet facilities.

== Reservoirs ==
In this district with rains that last only for a couple of months per year, reservoirs of different sizes allow harvesting runoff from the rainy season for further use in the dry season. The reservoirs of the district include:

- Addi Qenafiz
- Betqua
- Addi Gela
- Dur Anbesa
- Gereb Mihiz
- Filiglig
- Gereb Segen (Hintalo)

Overall, these reservoirs suffer from rapid siltation. Part of the water that could be used for irrigation is lost through seepage; the positive side-effect is that this contributes to groundwater recharge.
