= Betqua =

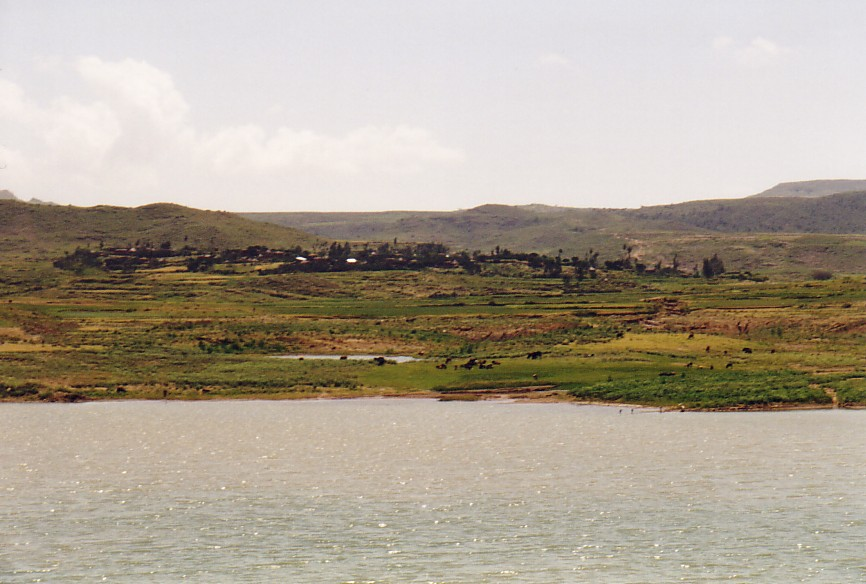

- Location within Ethiopia
- Coordinates: 13.32473607°N 39.33529336°E
- Type: Freshwater artificial lake
- Basin countries: Ethiopia
- Surface area: 0.137 km^{2} (0.053 sq mi)
- Water volume: 0.666×10^{6} m^{3} (540 acre⋅ft)
- Surface elevation: 2,270 m (7,450 ft)
- Settlements: Hintalo

Betqua is a reservoir located in the Hintalo Wajirat woreda of the Tigray Region in Ethiopia. The earthen dam that holds the reservoir was built in 1997 by SAERT.

== Dam characteristics ==
- Dam height: 16 metres
- Dam crest length: 284 metres
- Spillway width: 20 metres

== Capacity ==
- Original capacity: 666 337 m³
- Dead storage: 133 267 m³
- Reservoir area: 13.7 ha

In 2002, the life expectancy of the reservoir (the duration before it is filled with sediment) was estimated at 23 years.

== Irrigation ==
- Designed irrigated area: 70 ha
- Actual irrigated area in 2002: 25 ha

== Environment ==
The catchment of the reservoir is 1.52 km² large, with a perimeter of 4.82 km and a length of 1520 metres. The reservoir suffers from rapid siltation. The lithology of the catchment is Agula Shale and Mekelle Dolerite Part of the water that could be used for irrigation is lost through seepage; the positive side-effect is that this contributes to groundwater recharge.
