= Filiglig =

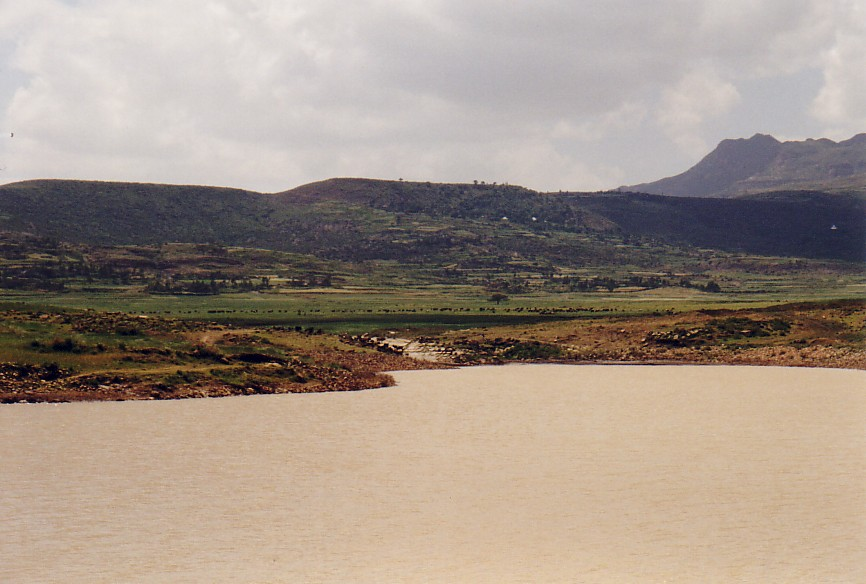

- Location within Ethiopia
- Coordinates: 13.24641279°N 39.4196826°E
- Type: Freshwater artificial lake
- Basin countries: Ethiopia
- Surface area: 0.065 km^{2} (0.025 sq mi)
- Water volume: 0.296×10^{6} m^{3} (240 acre⋅ft)
- Surface elevation: 2,070 m (6,790 ft)
- Settlements: Hintalo

Filiglig is a reservoir located in the Hintalo Wajirat woreda of the Tigray Region in Ethiopia. The earthen dam that holds the reservoir was built in 1998 by SAERT.

== Dam characteristics ==
- Dam height: 14 metres
- Dam crest length: 325 metres
- Spillway width: 15 metres

== Capacity ==
- Original capacity: 296000 m³
- Dead storage: 20832 m³
- Reservoir area: 6.5 ha

In 2002, the life expectancy of the reservoir (the duration before it is filled with sediment) was estimated at 30 years.

== Irrigation ==
- Designed irrigated area: 20 ha
- Actual irrigated area in 2002: 3 ha

== Environment ==
The catchment of the reservoir is 7.44 km^{2} large, with a perimeter of 14.23 km and a length of 5840 metres. The reservoir suffers from rapid siltation. The lithology of the catchment is Mekelle Dolerite and Agula Shale. Part of the water that could be used for irrigation is lost through seepage; the positive side-effect is that this contributes to groundwater recharge.
