= Amba Aradam =

Table mountain in Ethiopia

- Location within Ethiopia

Highest point
- Elevation: 2,756 m (9,042 ft)
- Coordinates: 13°20′N 39°31′E

Geography
- Location: Debub Misraqawi Zone, Tigray Region, Ethiopia

Amba Aradam is a table mountain in northern Ethiopia. Located in the Debub Misraqawi (Southeastern) Zone of the Tigray Region, between Mek'ele and Addis Ababa, it has a latitude and longitude of 13°20′N 39°31′E and an elevation of 2,756 metres (9,042 ft).

The name in Tigrinya is Imba Aradom, but international usage in geology (Amba Aradam Formation) and history (battles in the 1930s) have coined the name Amba Aradam.

== Geology ==
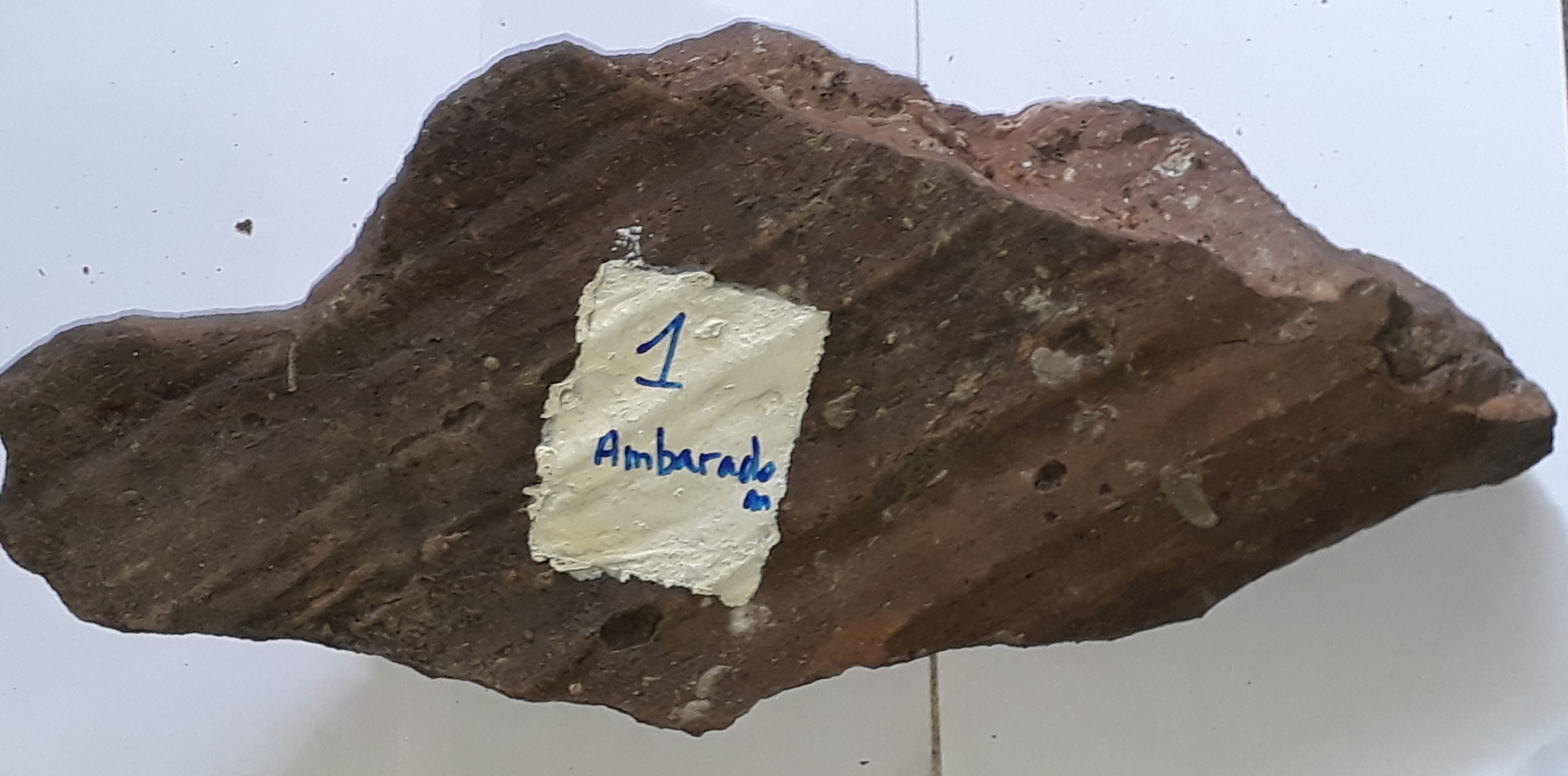
Rock sample of Amba Aradam sandstone with slickensides, collected along a fault at the northern edge of the mountain

The outcropping bedrock consists of Jurassic, sub-horizontally layered or slightly inclined, marine varicoloured marls and marly clays with interbedded limestones, sandstones and gypsum layers, that are part of the Agula Shales Formation. These are unconformably overlain by Cretaceous continental conglomerates, sandstones and laterite levels, belonging to the Amba Aradam Formation, which is obviously named after the mountain. The unconformity is due to a planation episode which followed the pre-Cretaceous marine regression. Dolerite sills and laccolites of Oligocene age are interlayered within the Agula Shales. Small dolerite necks are exposed on the westernmost edge of the upper escarpment and west of the Amba Aradam summit.

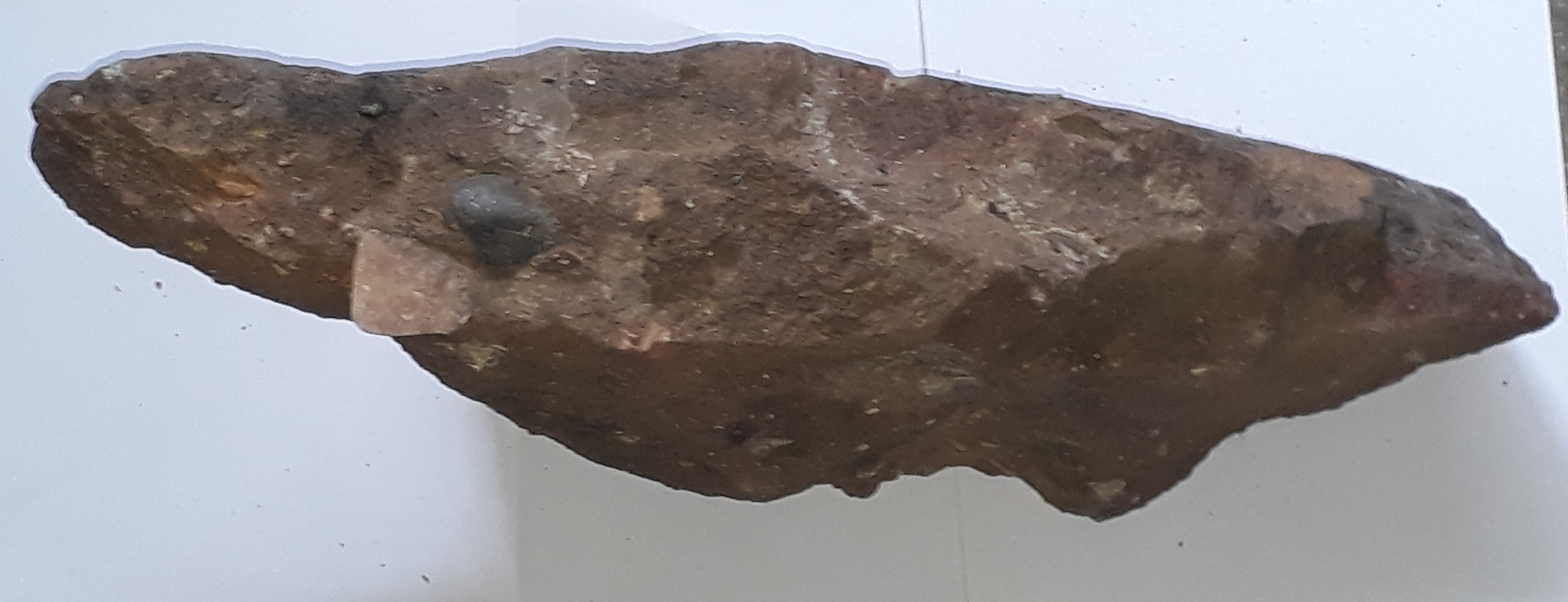
Rock sample of Amba Aradam sandstone with conglomeratic facies, collected along a fault at the northern edge of the mountain

== Vegetation ==
The present-day spontaneous vegetation is dominated by Juniperus procera, Eucalyptus camaldulensis and Podocarpus gracilior, although farming and grazing have reduced it to a sparse shrub cover, except for limited areas around churches where the holy character of the places allows their preservation.

== Settlements ==
Human settlements are scattered around the main relief, being usually located on the most favourable topographic situations, such as flat surfaces and foot slopes, where colluvial deposits allow subsistence farming. Major town on the foot of the mountain is Hintalo, which used to be capital of Tigray in the 19th century, after which large parts of the town were abandoned. Ruins of the abandoned quarters were observed in 1868 and are still present nowadays.

== History ==
The mount is famous for the Battle of Enderta that the Italians fought in order to capture Amba Aradam on 15 February 1936.
