= Gereb Segen (Hintalo) =

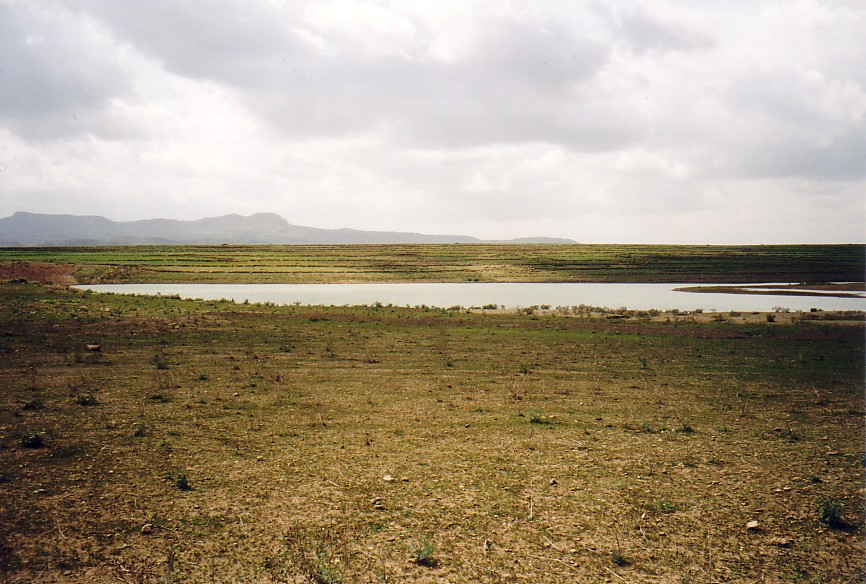

- Location within Ethiopia
- Coordinates: 13.25521166°N 39.49495665°E
- Type: Freshwater artificial lake
- Basin countries: Ethiopia
- Surface area: 0.117 km^{2} (0.045 sq mi)
- Water volume: 0.3374×10^{6} m^{3} (273.5 acre⋅ft)
- Surface elevation: 2,090 m (6,860 ft)
- Settlements: Hintalo

Gereb Segen is a reservoir located in the Hintalo Wajirat woreda of the Tigray Region in Ethiopia. The earthen dam that holds the reservoir was built in 2000 by SAERT.

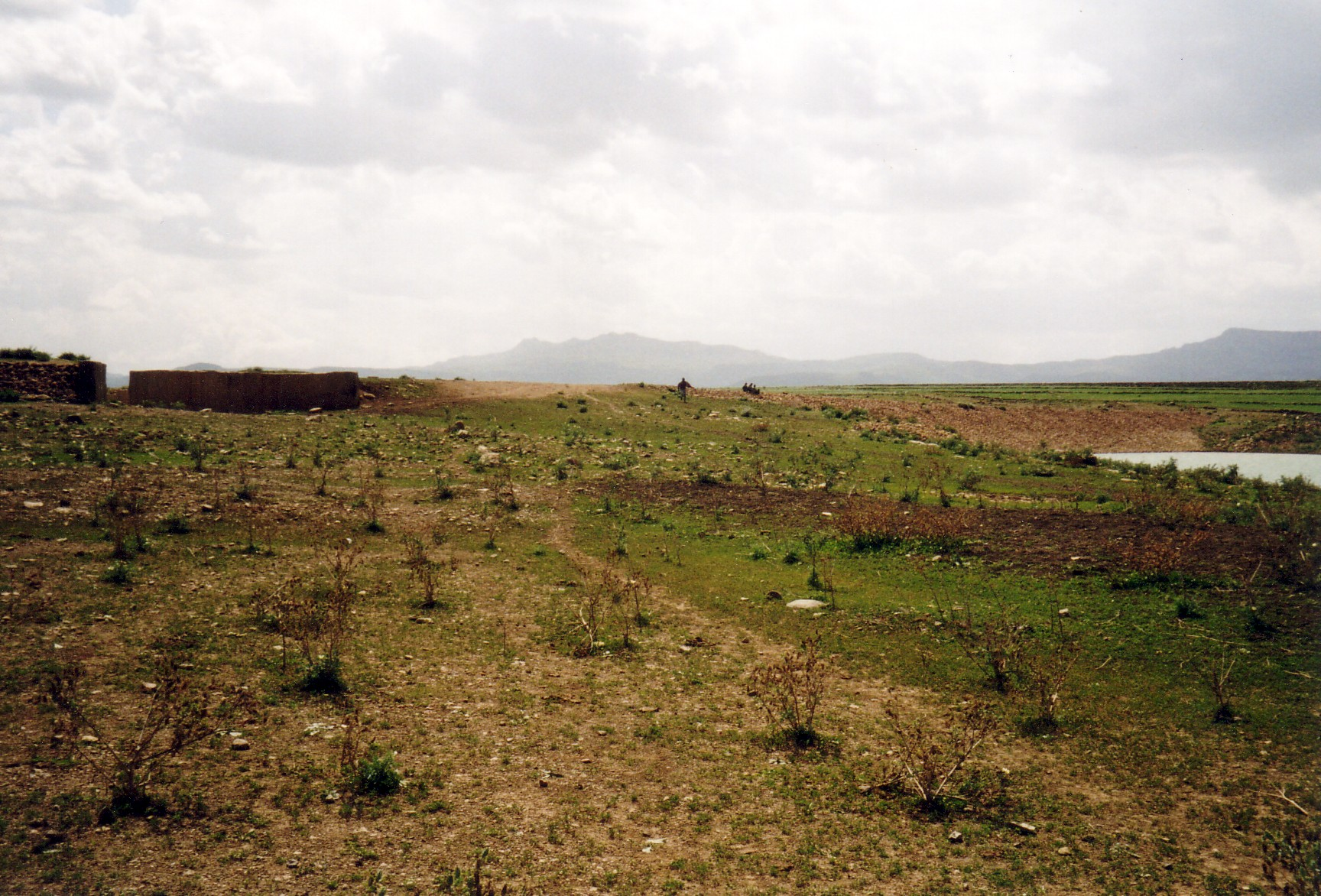
Gereb Segen (with spillway)

== Dam characteristics ==
- Dam height: 14.86 metres
- Dam crest length: 473 metres
- Spillway width: 8 metres

== Capacity ==
- Original capacity: 337408 m³
- Dead storage: 22400 m³
- Reservoir area: 11.7 ha

In 2002, the life expectancy of the reservoir (the duration before it is filled with sediment) was estimated at 25 years.

== Irrigation ==
- Designed irrigated area: 24 ha
- Actual irrigated area in 2002: zero ha

== Environment ==
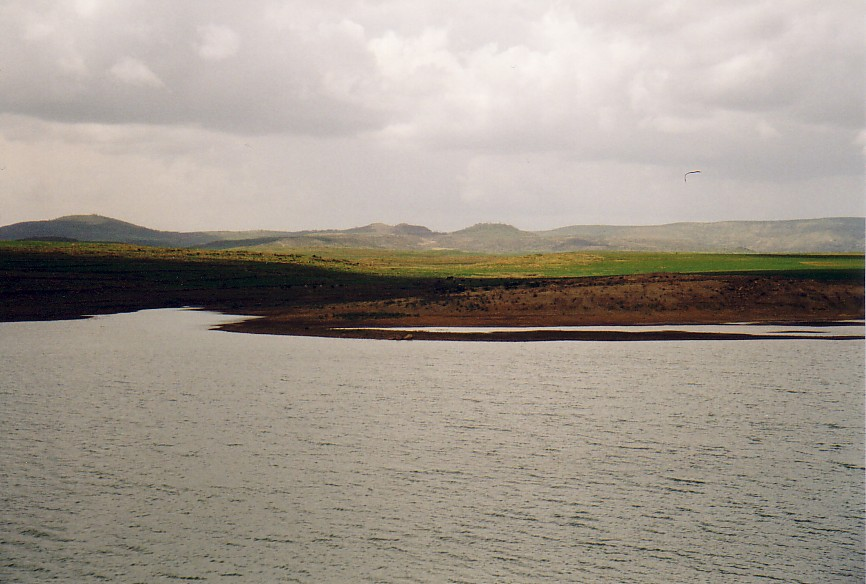
Gereb Segen with catchment

The catchment of the reservoir is 3.53 km^{2} large, with a perimeter of 11.66 km and a length of 5200 metres. The reservoir suffers from rapid siltation. The lithology of the catchment is Agula Shale. Part of the water that could be used for irrigation is lost through seepage; the positive side-effect is that this contributes to groundwater recharge.

== Homonymous places ==
There is a (much larger) dam with the same name, some 20 km to the northwest: Gereb Segen (May Gabat)
