= Gereb Awso =

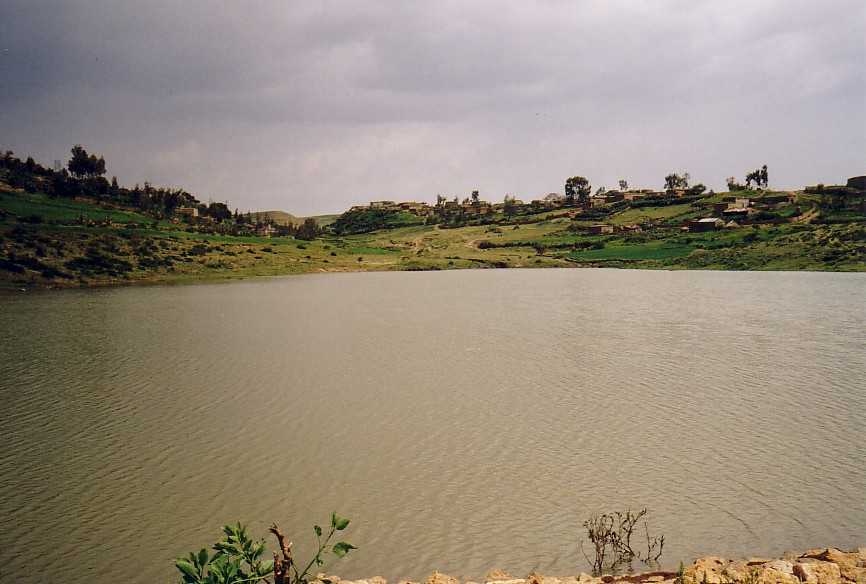

- Location within Ethiopia
- Coordinates: 13.4296493°N 39.55336882°E
- Type: Freshwater artificial lake
- Basin countries: Ethiopia
- Surface area: 0.0212 km^{2} (0.0082 sq mi)
- Water volume: 0.119×10^{6} m^{3} (96 acre⋅ft)
- Surface elevation: 2,290 m (7,510 ft)
- Settlements: Kwiha

Gereb Awso is a reservoir located in the Inderta woreda of the Tigray Region in Ethiopia. The earthen dam that holds the reservoir was built in 1998 by SAERT.

== Dam characteristics ==
- Dam height: 10.5 metres
- Dam crest length: 196 metres
- Spillway width: 3 metres

== Capacity ==
- Original capacity: 118944 m^{3}
- Dead storage: 3944 m^{3}
- Reservoir area: 2.12 ha

== Irrigation ==
- Designed irrigated area: 9 ha
- Actual irrigated area in 2002: 5 ha

== Environment ==
The catchment of the reservoir is 1.21 km^{2} large, with a perimeter of 4.62 km and a length of 1780 metres. The reservoir suffers from rapid siltation. The lithology of the catchment is Agula Shale. Part of the water that could be used for irrigation is lost through seepage; the positive side-effect is that this contributes to groundwater recharge.
