= Dergajen =

Municipality in Tigray Region, Ethiopia

Coordinates: 13°30′N 39°41′E

Dergajen (or Derge Agen) was a woreda in Enderta Province, in Tigray Region, Ethiopia. Its administrative center was Kwiha; now is a tabia (municipality) located 19 kilometers east of Kwiha, Ethiopia. The administrative center of the tabia is located in the village of Aragure. A weekly market is organized in Aragure. According to the 2007 census, 9524 people were living in the tabia, which results in a population density of 68 inhabitants per square kilometer.

== Geography ==
Dergajen is located on the hydrographic divide between the Tekeze catchment in the west and the endoreic Afar basin to the east. The western part of Dergajen consists of gentle slopes descending in a western direction. These slopes have an elevation of 2400 to 2600 meters above sea level. The eastern part of the tabia consists of steep slopes, descending into the Afar lowlands. The administrative center is located in Aragure, a village which is centrally located in the tabia. In 1938, Araguren counted approximately 700 inhabitants (including 5 Italians). At that time, there was a shop, a fountain, a telephone office and a health post. Araguren is located on the left bank of a river starting in the higher May Serakit reservoir and drains to the south-southwest to the large Chichat reservoir, which was built in 1984. The dam for the Mai Serakit reservoir was built between 2006 and 2009. In the southern part of the tabia a second large reservoir exists: the Hashenge reservoir which was built in 1996-97. A last reservoir, at the west, is Arato.

== Geology and soils ==
The following geological formations are present in this locality:

- Agula Shale
- Mekelle Dolerite
- Antalo Limestone
- Quaternary alluvium and freshwater tufa

The main geomorphic unit, with corresponding soil types is:

- Gently undulating Agula shale plateau with dolerite
  - Dominant soil type: stony, dark cracking clays with good natural fertility (Vertic Cambisol)
  - Associated soil types
    - rock outcrops, stony and shallow soils (Lithic Leptosol)
    - red-brownish loamy soils with good natural fertility (Chromic Luvisol)
  - Inclusions
    - deep, dark cracking clays on calcaric material with good fertility but poor drainage (Vertisol)

== Economy ==
The area gets relatively larger quantities of precipitation, due to its location on the eastern edge of the Ethiopian Highlands. The economy is based on agro-pastoral agriculture. The main crops are barley and wheat. Secondary crops are teff and lentils. The wheat and teff is mostly traded in Mekelle. From January to August, barley and wheat are imported from Mekelle. The livestock of the people living in the tabia usely grazes in the Afar lowlands.

== Administrative divisions ==
With an area of approximately 139 square kilometers, Dergajen used to be a district of the Enderta province already in Imperial times. In those times, Qwiha functioned as administrative center for the district Dergajen, while Mekelle was the capital of the Enderta province. Nowadays, the administrative divisions have changed. The Enderta province became obsolete and the Enderta name only denotes the former core area of the province, the actual Enderta woreda. As the former center, Mekelle, was carved out of this district and given its proper Special Zone, Qwiha became the center of the remaining Enderta district. Just as with Enderta, Dergajen is not a district (or woreda) anymore, but just a municipality (although one of the largest of the Enderta district).
