= Amba Aradam Formation =

Rock formation

- Stratigraphic range: Early Aptian; ~120 Ma
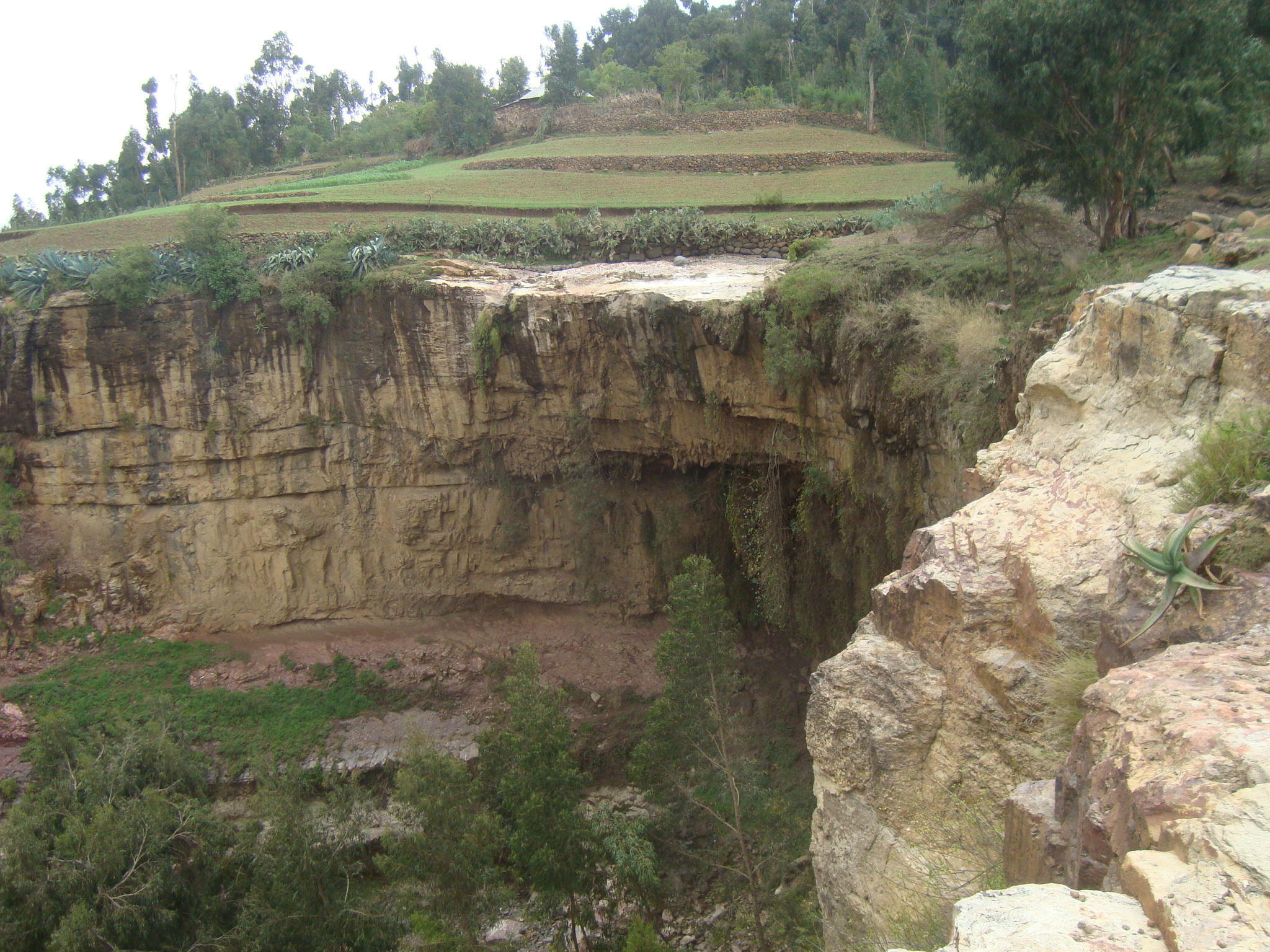
- Cliff and waterfall at Dingilet, Mika’el Abiy tabia
- Type: Geological formation
- Sub-units: Graua Limestone member
- Underlies: Tertiary basalts
- Overlies: Agula Shale, Mugher Mudstone
- Thickness: 200 m (660 ft)

Lithology
- Primary: Sandstone, siltstone
- Other: Claystone, conglomerates, iron oxide

Location
- Coordinates: 13.328°N 39.438°E
- Approximate paleocoordinates: 15.2°S 28.5°E
- Region: Tigray
- Country: Ethiopia
- Extent: northern Ethiopian Highlands

Type section
- Named for: Imba Aradom mountain, near Hintalo
- Named by: William Thomas Blanford
- Year defined: 1868
- Amba Aradam Formation (Ethiopia)

The Amba Aradam Formation is a Cretaceous sandstone formation in Ethiopia. It is up to 200 metres thick, for instance in the Degua Tembien district. As fossils are absent, the age of the Amba Aradam Formation was interpreted based on the age of assumed corresponding sandstones elsewhere in Ethiopia: the Debre Libanos Sandstones in the Blue Nile Basin, and the Upper Sandstone near Harrar in southeast Ethiopia, both of Late Cretaceous age (100–66 million years ago). The lithology of the Amba Aradam Formation makes it less suitable for rock church excavation; caves have however been blasted in this formation to serve as headquarters for the TPLF during the Ethiopian Civil War of the 1980s.

== Name and definition ==
The name “Amba Aradam Sandstone” was coined by geologist William Thomas Blanford, who accompanied the British invading army in 1868. The formation is named after the Amba Aradam mountain, where the formation widely outcrops. So far the nomenclature was not proposed for recognition to the International Commission on Stratigraphy.

== Stratigraphic context ==
The Amba Aradam Formation overlies the Agula Shale at Imba Aradom and in the eastern part of Dogu’a Tembien; further to the west, it rests on the Antalo Limestone and then on the Adigrat Sandstone. After the deposition of the sands that were to become the Amba Aradam Formation, planation has occurred. This was then followed by the deposition of the Tertiary Trap Volcanics.

== Lithology ==
The Amba Aradam Formation comprises white or red cross-bedded sandstones, and also mottled purple to violet siltstones and claystones. The sandstones are composed of quartz grains, cemented by clay minerals and iron oxides. The sediment was probably deposited in rivers. The iron oxide cementation (laterisation) makes the upper part of the formation harder, heavier and almost impervious for water. Locally, conglomerates occur.

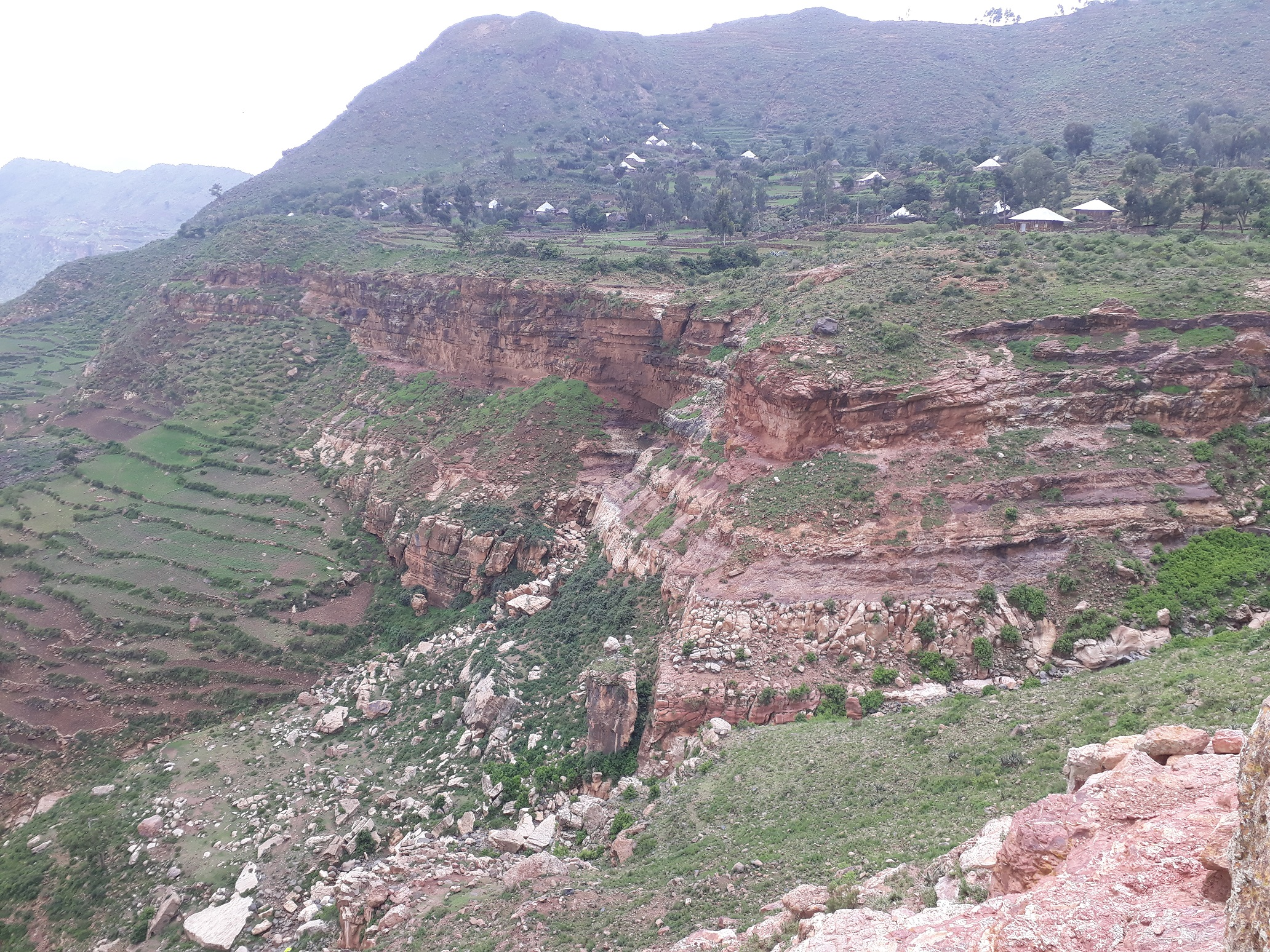
Cliff in Amba Aradam Sandstone at Gumuara, here, at its westernmost occurrence, it directly overlies the Adigrat Sandstone

=== Rock sample gallery ===
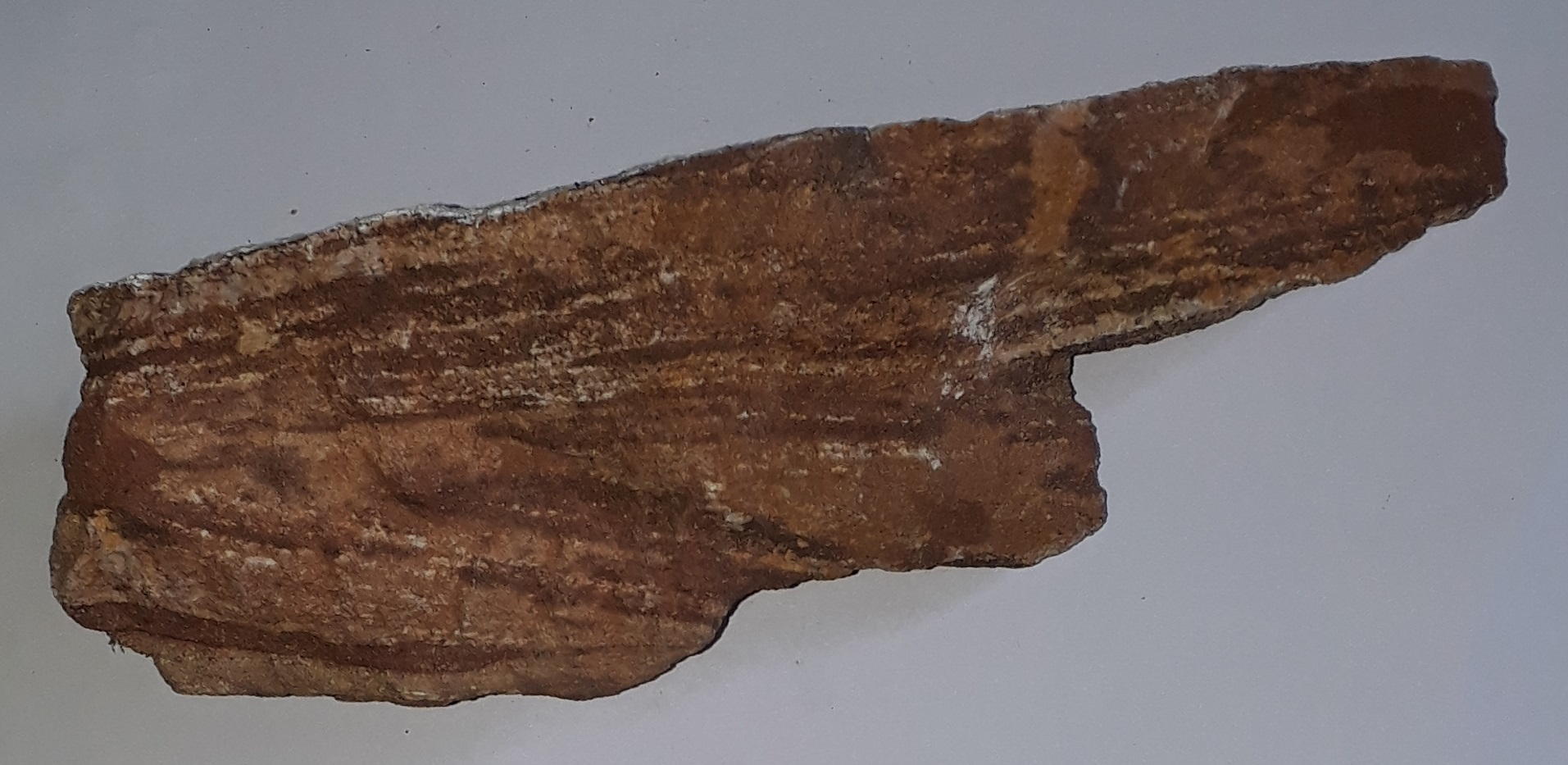
Rock sample with cross-bedding, collected in Miheno

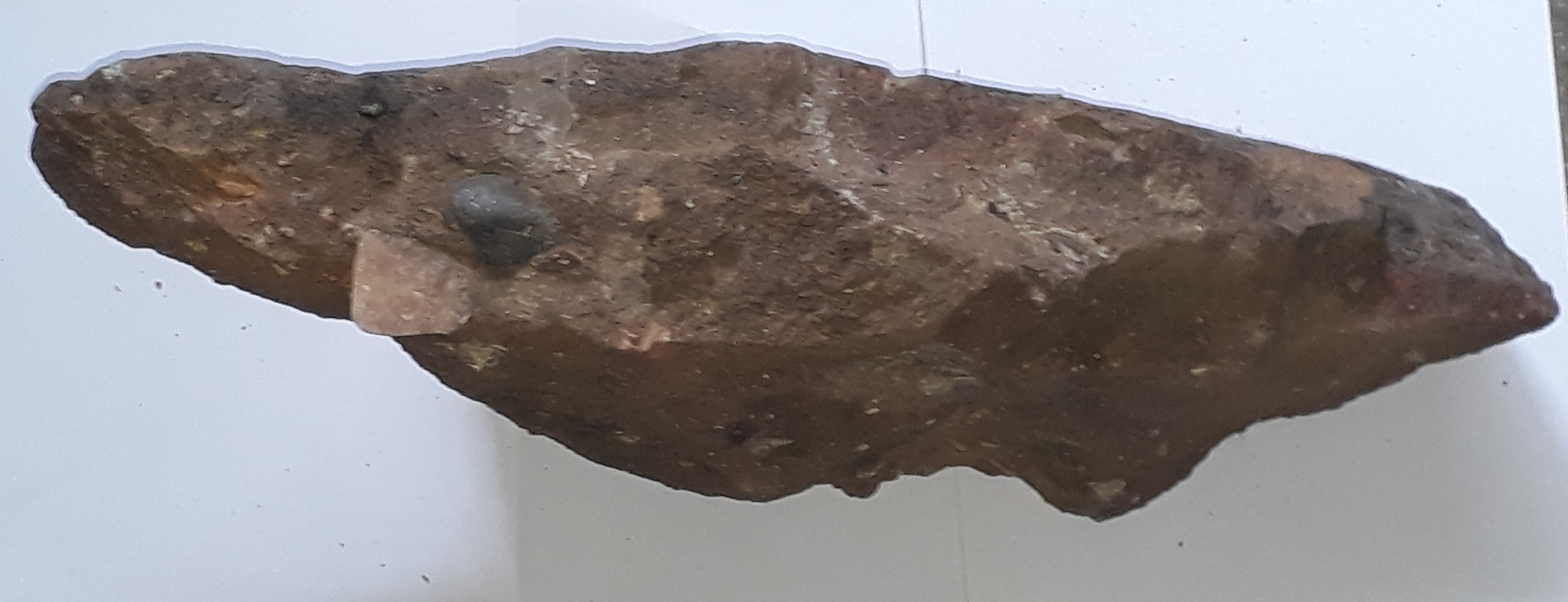
Rock sample, conglomeratic facies, collected on Imba Aradom

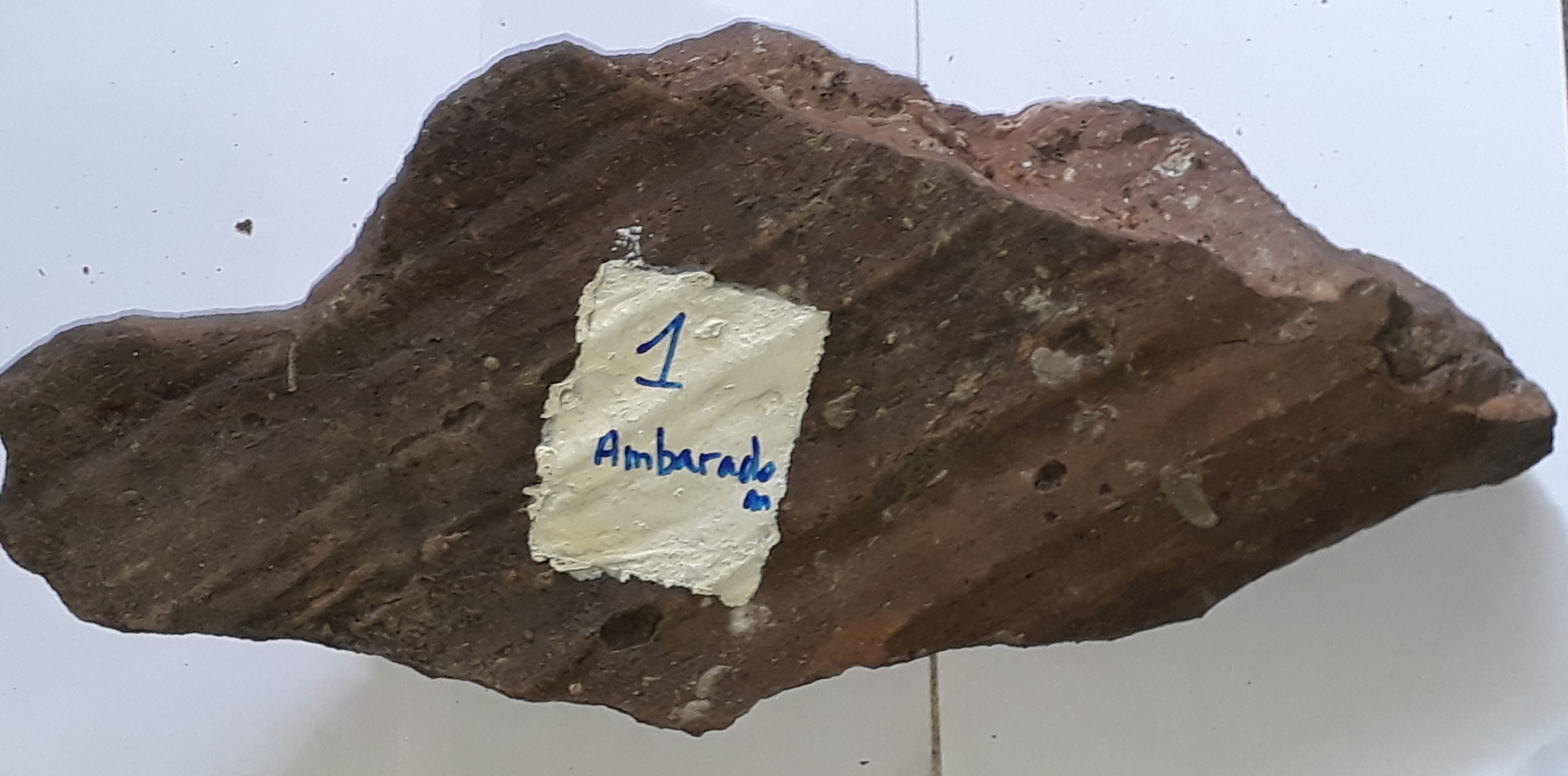
Rock sample with slickenside collected along a fault on Imba Aradom

== Geographical extent ==
Besides at Imba Aradom, the formation outcrops on the ridges north of Imba Alaje, and particularly in the Dogu'a Tembien district, all in the Tigray region of Ethiopia.

== Current geomorphology of the Amba Aradam Formation ==
The mesas of the Amba Aradam Formation, locally with trap volcanic cover, have an alternance of steep slopes and short moderate sections due to the alternance of beds of sandstone and layers of less resistant claystone or siltstone. The formation does not have high vertical cliffs like the Adigrat Sandstone. The iron-cemented upper part of the formation forms however steep cliffs, which can be more than 10 metres (33 ft) high. These layers are also impermeable, what results in a spring line at the edge of the Amba Aradam sandstone cliff.

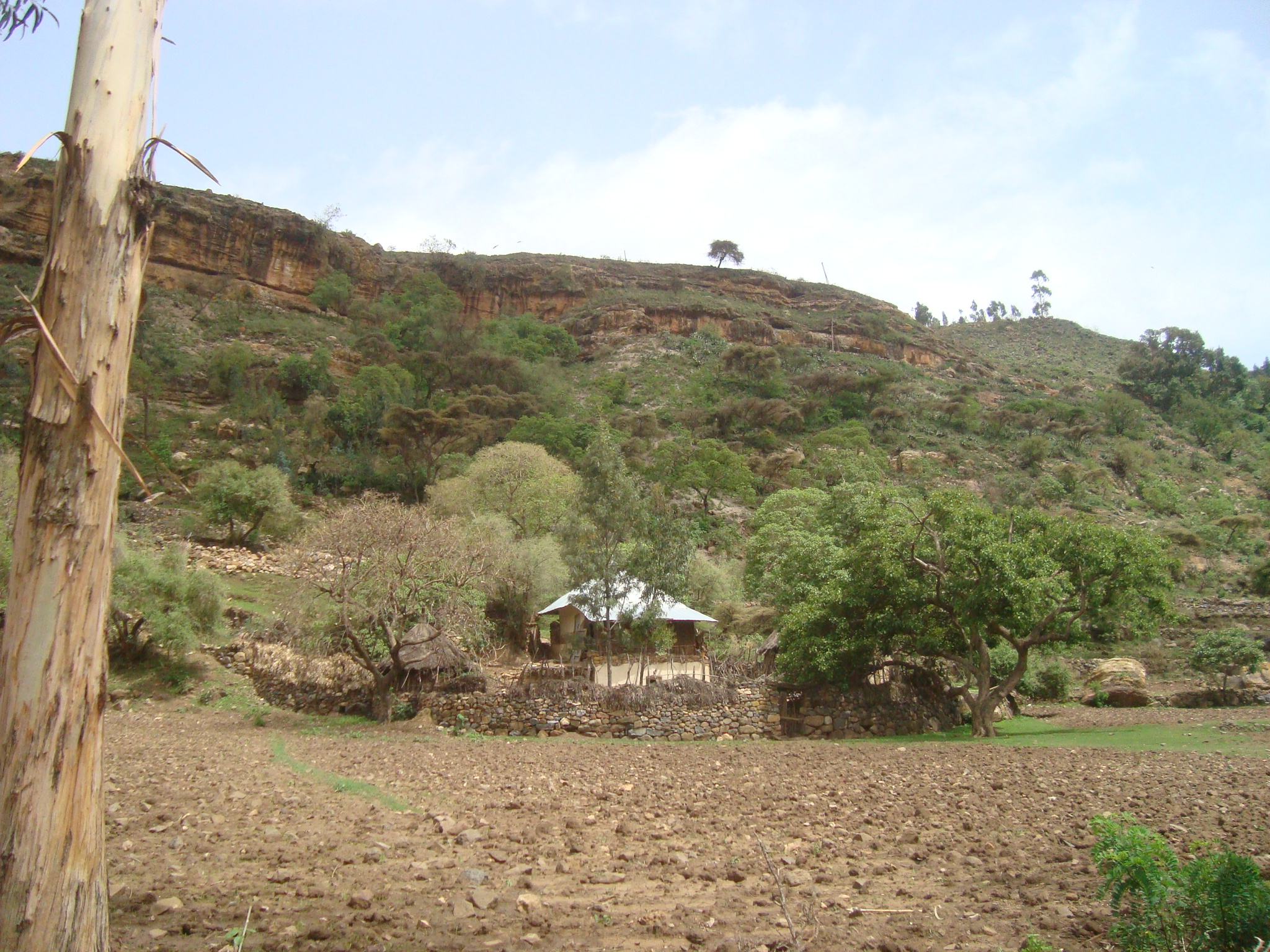
Cliff in Amba Aradam Sandstone at Addi Geza'iti; the previous TPLF headquarters were hewn in this cliff, at right

== Caves used as headquarters during the Ethiopian Civil War ==
In the 1980s, during the civil war, the Tigray People's Liberation Front (TPLF) excavated a cave in the sandstones of the Amba Aradam Formation, using dynamite. The cave is located near the Addi Geza'iti village, to the west of Hagere Selam, and served as offices for its leaders, including Meles Zenawi and Siye Abraha. The allied Ethiopian People’s Democratic Movement (EPDM) installed its HQ in a nearby cave at Melfa. Major military operations were coordinated from these caves almost until their victory against the Derg government in 1991. Both caves can be visited on appointment (contact at the Dogu'a Tembien district office, Hagere Selam, Tigray).
