= Chichat =

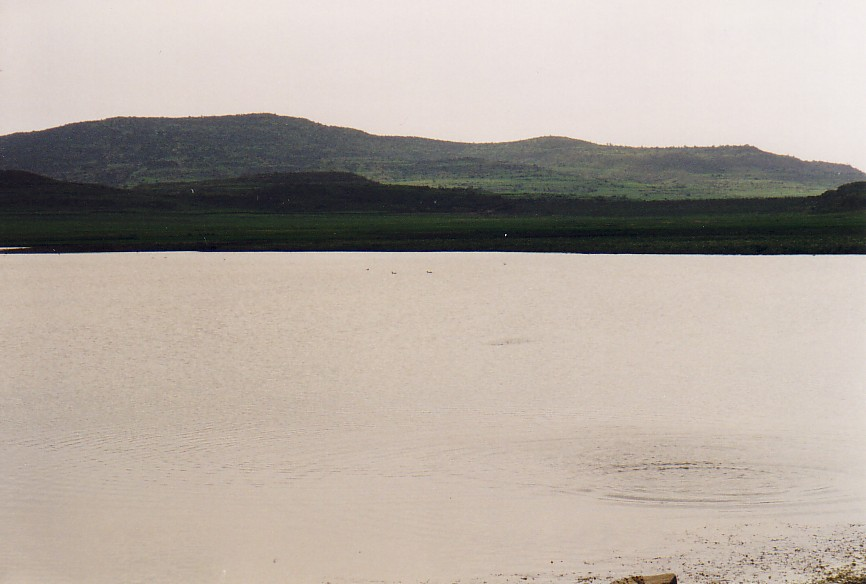

- Location within Ethiopia
- Coordinates: 13.49142096°N 39.65607985°E
- Type: Freshwater artificial lake
- Basin countries: Ethiopia
- Surface elevation: 2,360 m (7,740 ft)
- Settlements: Araguren

Chichat is a reservoir located in the Inderta woreda of the Tigray Region in Ethiopia. The 482-metres long earthen dam that holds the reservoir was built in 1985 by the Relief and Rehabilitation Commission.

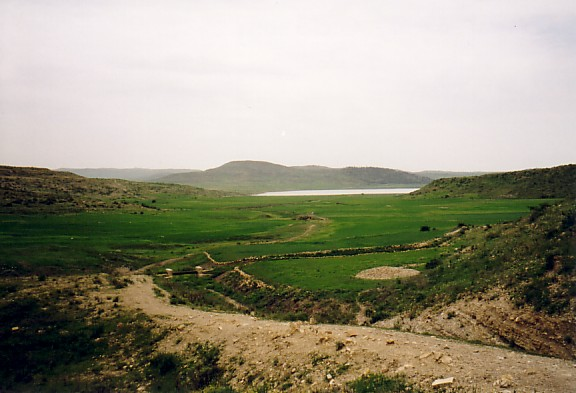
Chichat (from Indazib'i)

The catchment of the reservoir is 28.89 km² large, with a perimeter of 27.8 km and a length of 6740 metres. The reservoir suffers from rapid siltation. The lithology of the catchment is Agula Shale. As soon as the water table starts lowering after the end of the rainy season, the surrounding farmers implement recession agriculture on the exposed sediment. Part of the water that could be used for irrigation is lost through seepage; the positive side-effect is that this contributes to groundwater recharge.
