= South Eastern Zone, Tigray =

Zone in Tigray Region of Ethiopia

South Eastern Zone ዞባ ደቡባዊ ምብራቕ Zoba Enderta
- Zone
- Country: Ethiopia
- Region: Tigray

Population (2007)
  - Total: 392,142 (estim.)

The South Eastern Zone (Tigrinya: ዞባ ደቡባዊ ምብራቕ) is a zone in the Tigray Region of Ethiopia. The South Eastern Zone is bordered on the south by the Southern Zone, on the southwest by Agaw in the Amhara Region, on the northwest by the Central Zone, on the north by the Eastern Zone, on the east by the Afar Region, and it surrounds the enclaved Mekelle Special Zone.

== Demographics ==
As the zone was created after the census of 2007, it is hard to find correct data about the population of the zone. The estimated size of population according to 2007 census conducted by the CSA is 392,142, of which 21,125 or 5.39% were urban dwellers.
