= Antalo =

Village in Tigray Region, Ethiopia

Hintalo ሕንጣሎ Hentalo
- Town
- Location within Ethiopia
- Coordinates: 13°19′N 39°27′E
- Country: Ethiopia
- Region: Tigray
- Zone: Debub Misraqawi (Southeastern)
- Woreda: Hintalo Wajirat
- Elevation: 2,050 m (6,730 ft)

Population (2005)
  - Total: 1,179
- Time zone: UTC+3 (EAT)

Hintalo (Tigrinya: ሕንጣሎ), also called Antalo, was Administrative Center of Enderta’s historical wereda of Gabat Melash, is a small town located in the Debub Misraqawi (Southeastern) Zone of the Tigray Region of Ethiopia. It lies on a plateau with an elevation variously reported as 2050 to 2102 meters above sea level. It lies some 20 miles south of Mekelle, the capital of Tigray. The urge to control this fortified mountainous place has provoked frequent engagements among various Tigrayan chiefs since the 17th century. Hintalo flourished as a town in the last quarter of the 18th and beginning of the 19th century.

== History ==
=== Origins ===
Historically, Hintalo was the capital city of Enderta Province. Located on a high plateau beneath the south face of Amba Aradam, which made the town a natural fortress. With the advent of ras Wolde Selassie of Enderta to power as Governor of all Tigray, Hintalo became the political center of Tigray. Earlier, it was the residence and a safe hideout of his father dejazmach Kafle Iyasus, who once rose up to challenge the authority of ras Mikael Sehul of Tigray. Furthermore, one of the most insecure Gondarine "shadow emperors", atse Tekle Giyorgis once took asylum in the same area. It was from Hintalo that ras Wolde Selassie received annual taxes, reviewed troops and declared administrative re-organizations. His ambition to overthrow the Yejju dynasty induced him to undertake the necessary preparation from Hintalo.

=== 17th century ===
It was first mentioned in 1648 by the Yemeni ambassador Hasan ibn Ahmad al-Haymat, who described it as a "fortified town". In 1678 Hintalo was the location of a battle; some of the prominent men of Lasta intended to join a rebellion in southern Tigray, but they were defeated, and some of those from Hintalo were driven over the precipices to their deaths.

=== 19th century ===
Parallel to the physical extension of the town, Hintalo's population grew rapidly in the beginning of the 19th century. Meanwhile, Hintalo emerged as the principal commercial center of Tigray, second only to Adwa. It was frequented by Muslims and Christians alike. Nevertheless, the town had declines immediately after the death of its patron, ras Wolde Selassie. It was badly affected by the chaos that followed and became overshadowed by Adigrat, the new political center established by Sabagadis Woldu of Agame. The latter succeeded Wolde Selassie as Governor of Tigray. Even the, Hintalo survived as an important market-center of the salt trade throughout the 19th century.

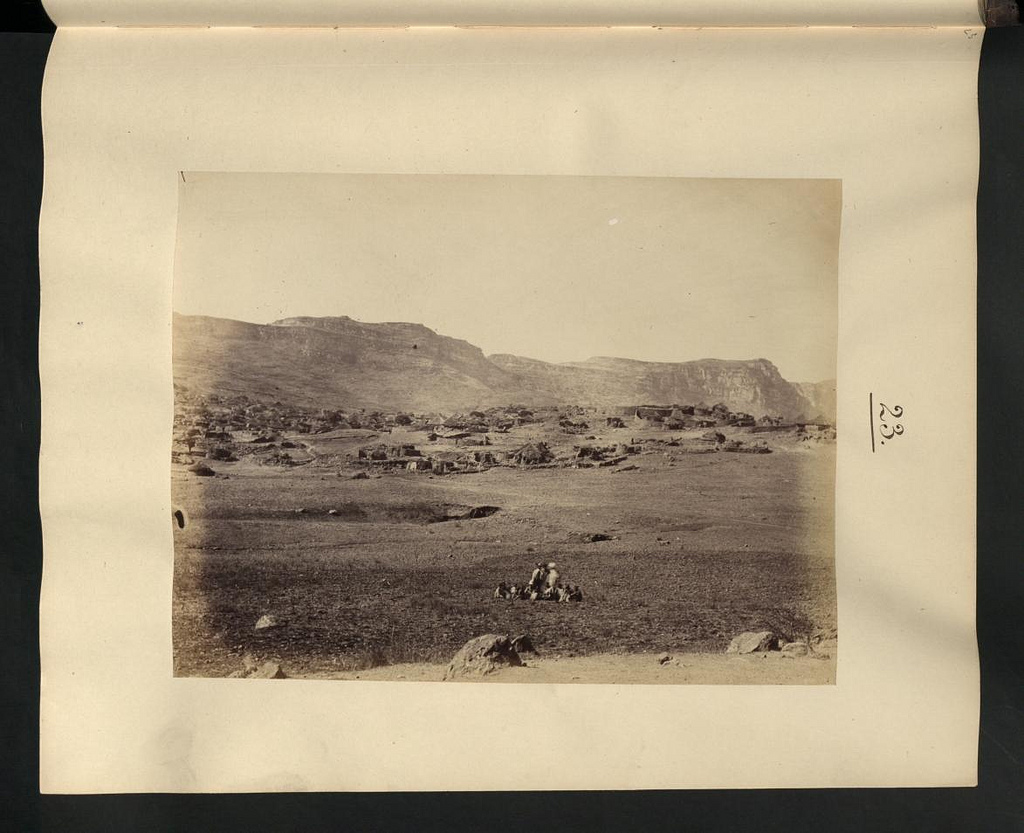
Hintalo during the Napier Expedition.

Ras Wolde Selassie made Hintalo his capital. It was here that Henry Salt met the ras in September, 1805. By March 1810, it was described as the capital of Enderta Province. A later meeting at Hintalo between Dejazmach Kassai Mercha (the future Yohannes IV) and Sir Robert Napier on 25–26 February 1868, led to the Dejazmach agreeing to deliver 15,000 kilograms of grain per week to each of the British camps at Hintalo and Adigrat used to support their 1868 Expedition to Abyssinia; for this, Dejazmach Kassai was later rewarded with a formidable quantity of supplies and material worth approximately £500,000.

By 1880, most of the town was in ruins but the weekly market remained important for the area. During the 1890s, it was a notable source of ivory and some 16,000 oxen, 8,000 cows, 8,000 goats, and 17,000 sheep were sold annually. On 9 October 1895, the Italian Major Ameglio with six companies and two pieces of artillery attacked Ethiopian warriors under Ras Mengesha Yohannes. The Italians caught about 200 prisoners, a thousand head of cattle, and many rifles. The Italian askari lost 11 dead and 30 wounded, while 16 dead Tigrayans were counted on the battle site and 60 wounded were said to have been carried from there.

=== 20th century ===
Hintalo was occupied by the Italian army in the Second Italo-Abyssinian War after their victory over the Ethiopians in the Battle of Enderta. Currently, it is only a small town and the capital of the Hintalo subdistrict in the South-Eastern Tigray Zone. The population was estimated at 899 inhabitants in 2000.

== Demographics ==
In 1867, Hintalo was described as one of the principal towns of Tigray, containing 200 to 300 houses.

Based on figures from the Central Statistical Agency in 2005, Hintalo has an estimated total population of 1,179 of whom 593 are men and 586 are women. The 1994 census reported it had a total population of 676 of whom 316 were men and 360 were women.

== Geography ==
Hintalo lies on a plateau in the Ethiopian Highlands near its eastern escarpment. It is just south of a steep hill formerly used for defense and just north of a wide fertile plain, along the road from Shoa to Massawa, the former Ethiopian port which now lies within Eritrea. Geologically, it is surrounded by fossil-bearing limestone.

Geologists have named the very thick calcareous strata, which are very developed in Tigray, the Antalo Limestone.

== Notable inhabitants ==
The hereditary chiefs of Enderta had their birthplace in Hintalo. These included the 18th and 19th century aristocrats Dejazmach Weldo, Dejazmach Kifla Iyasus and Ras Wolde Selassie. In his Life in Abyssinia, the 19th-century British traveller Mansfield Parkyns writes that the family of Dejazmach Kifla Iyasus and Ras Wolde Selassie were of distinguished origin and came from Hintalo in Enderta, where they were chiefs.

Hintalo is also the birthplace of Ras Bitweded Gebre Kidan, the son of Bilatengeta Zemu of Hintalo Enderta. Ras Bitweded Gebre Kidan was the Enderassie of Emperor Yohaness IV, and served as the Ethiopia's prime minister from 1872 to 1889. He married Emperor Yohanes's sister Empress Dinkinsh, with whom he had 3 children, who included Dejazmach Seyoum Gebre Kidan.

== Notes ==
=== Bibliography ===
- Baynes, T. S., ed. (1878), "Antalo" , Encyclopædia Britannica, vol. 2 (9th ed.), New York: Charles Scribner's Sons, p. 100
- Cana, Frank Richardson (1911), "Abyssinia" , in Chisholm, Hugh (ed.), Encyclopædia Britannica, vol. 2 (11th ed.), Cambridge University Press, pp. 82–95
