= List of towns and cities in Tigray =

This is a list of cities and town in Tigray, Ethiopia ordered by size and alphabetically.

== By population ==
The table below shows cities and towns with more than 40,000 inhabitants (from the projection for 2016 by using the 2007 census data). The population numbers are referring to the inhabitants of the cities themselves, suburbs and the metropolitan area outside the city area are not taken into account. Given the suburbs and the metropolitan area, the number of inhabitants might be much larger in several cases. Mekelle, for example, might have a total population of 4.5 to 5 million if also taking the metropolitan area into account.

Order	Name	Census 1984	Census 1994	Census 2007	Projected Estimate 2016	Region	Zone/Woreda
1.	Mekelle	35,332	120,249	215,914	340,859	Tigray	Mekelle Special Zone
24.	Adigrat	16,262	37,417	57,588	90,658	Tigray	Misraqawi Zone
29.	Shire (Inda Selassie)	12,846	25,269	47,284	74,503	Tigray	Semien Mi'irabawi Zone
32.	Aksum	17,753	27,148	44,647	70,360	Tigray	Mehakelegnaw Zone
38.	Adwa	13,823	24,519	40,500	63,759	Tigray	Mehakelegnaw Zone
46.	Alamata	14,030	26,179	33,214	52,435	Tigray	Debubawi Zone

== Alphabetical ==
This listing does not have a threshold for the size of the towns and cities. This listing has 256 cities and towns.

=== A ===
Map of Tigray Region

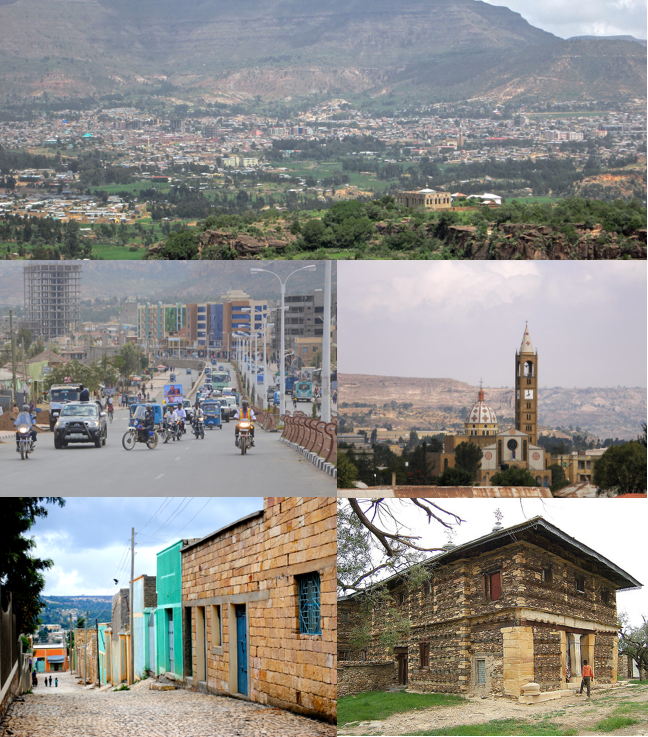
Adigrat

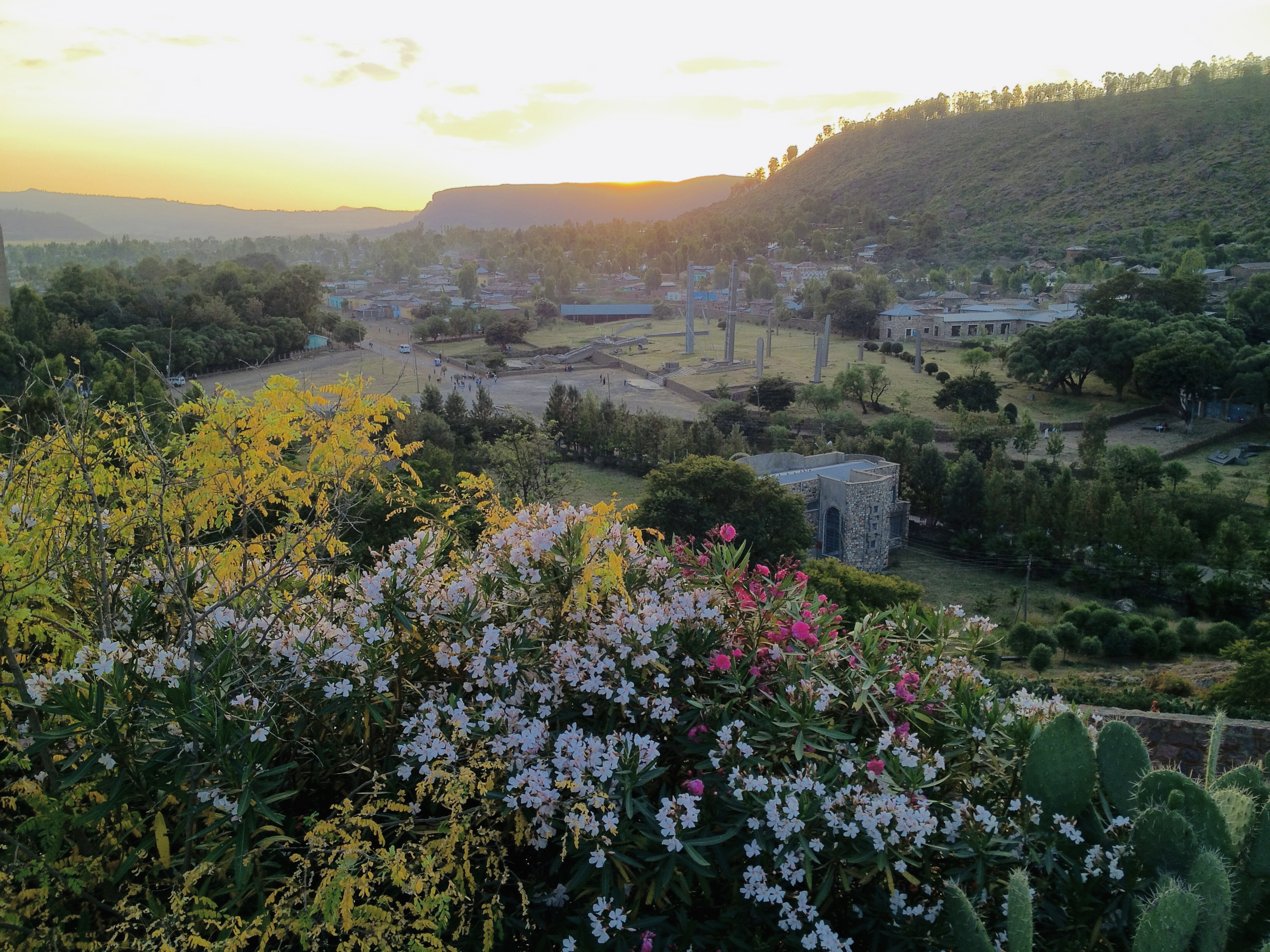
Axum

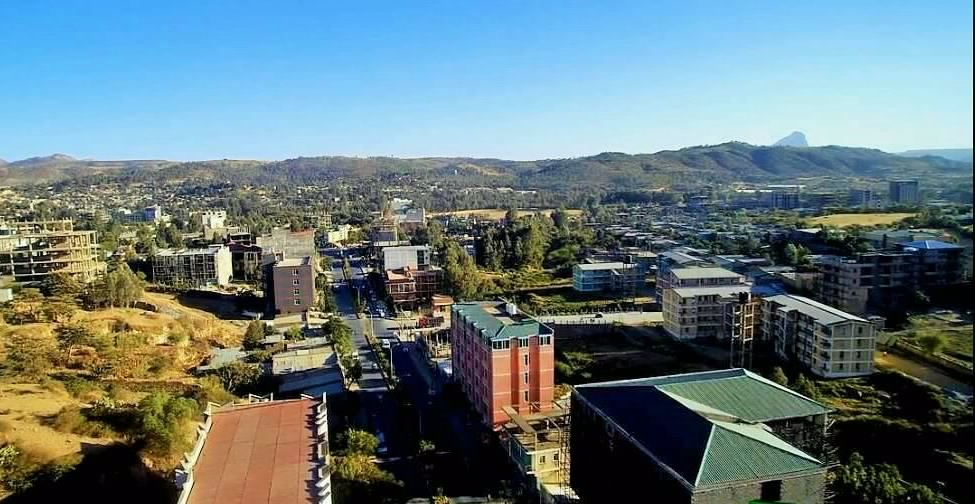
Adwa

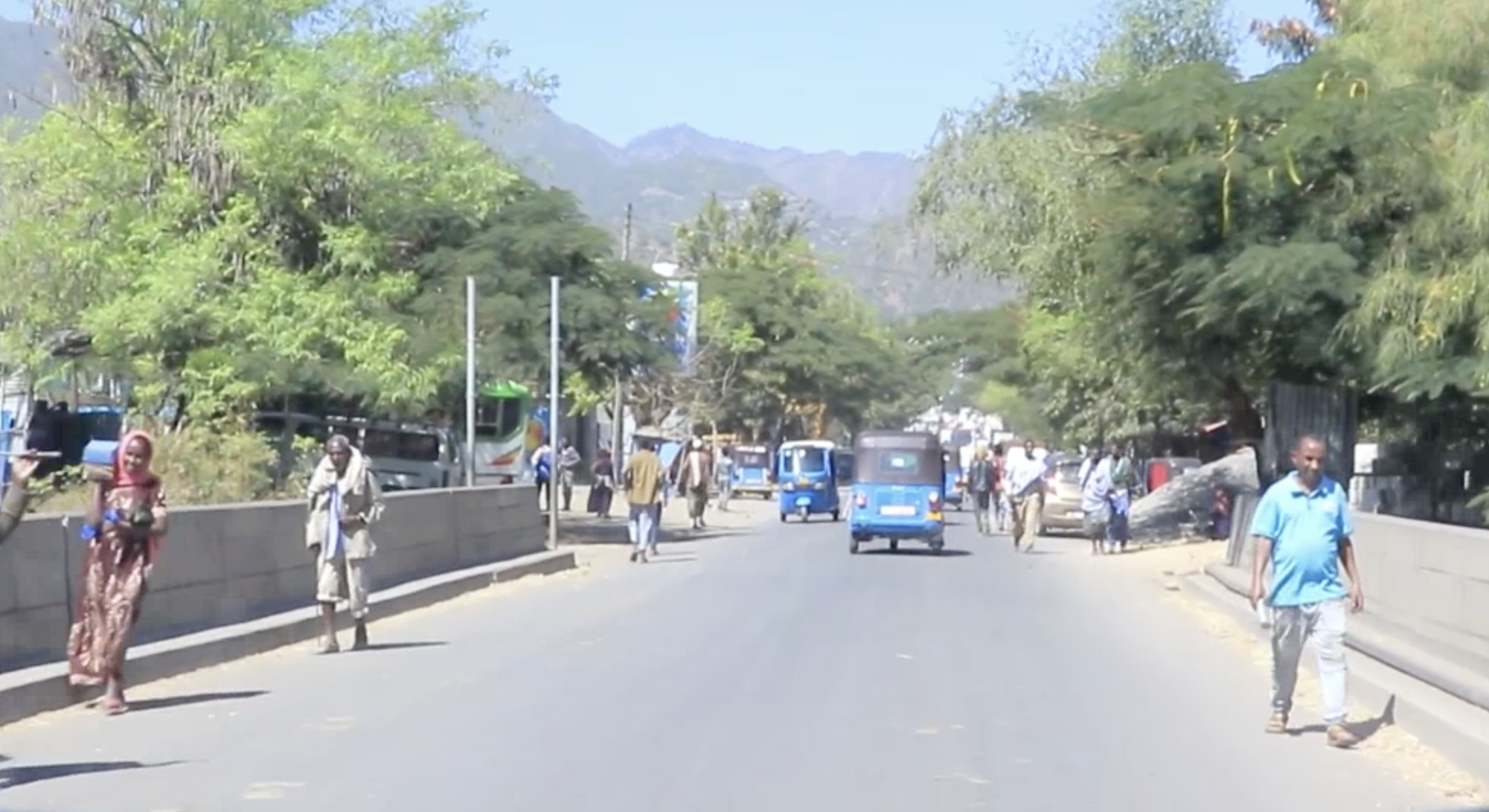
Alamata

- Abiy Addi
- Adi Daero
- Adi Gudom
- Adigrat
- Adwa
- Agula
- Alamata
- Ambalage
- Axum

=== B ===
- Bora
- Bizzet

=== C ===
- Chercher

=== D ===
- Dansha

=== E ===
- Enticho

=== F ===
- Fire Selam
- Freweyni

=== G ===
- Gijet

=== H ===
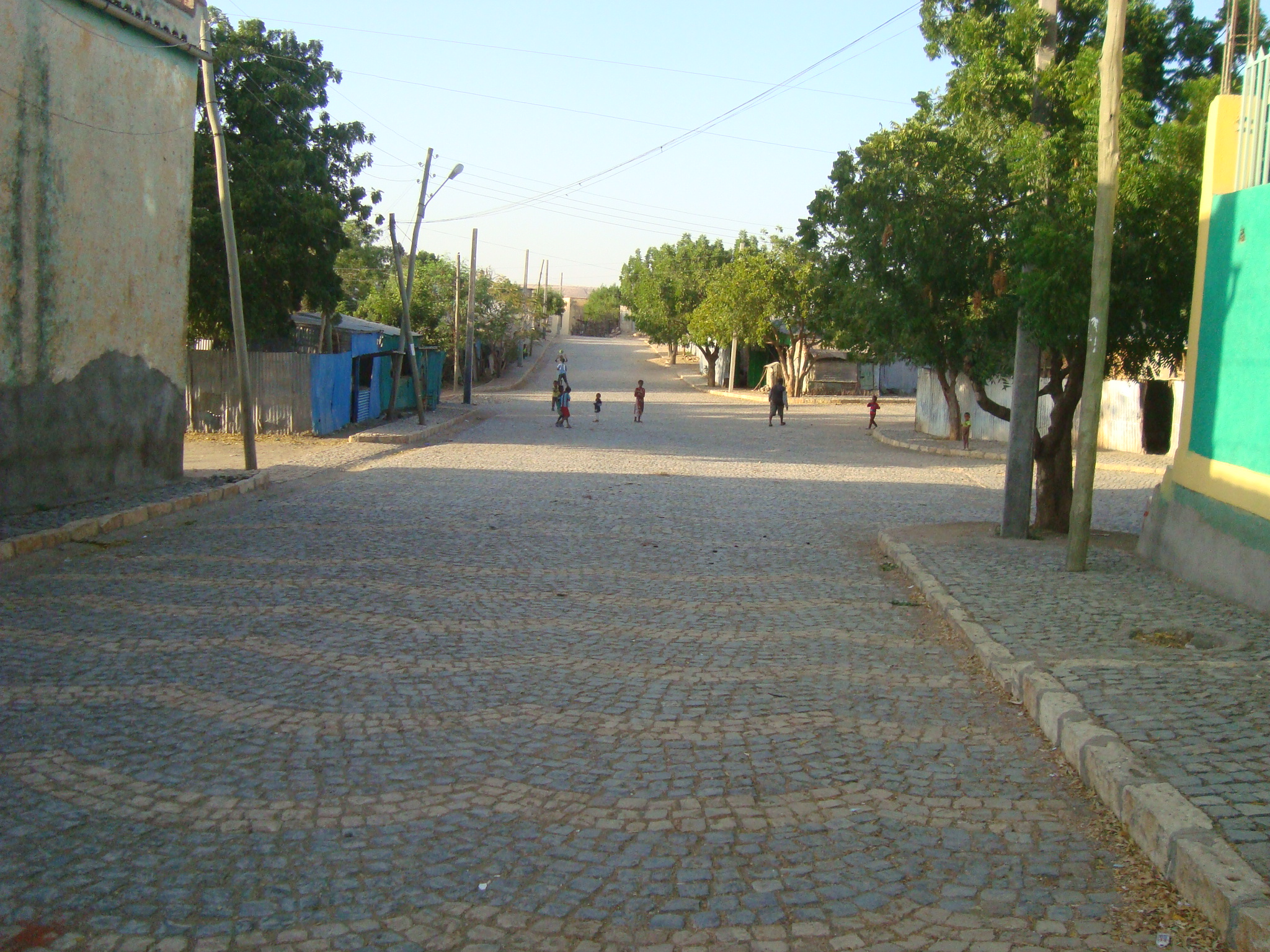
Humera

- Humera

=== I ===
- Idaga Hamus (Saesi Tsaedaemba)
- Inda Aba Guna (Indabaguna)

=== K ===
- Kobo
- Kombolcha
- Korem

=== M ===
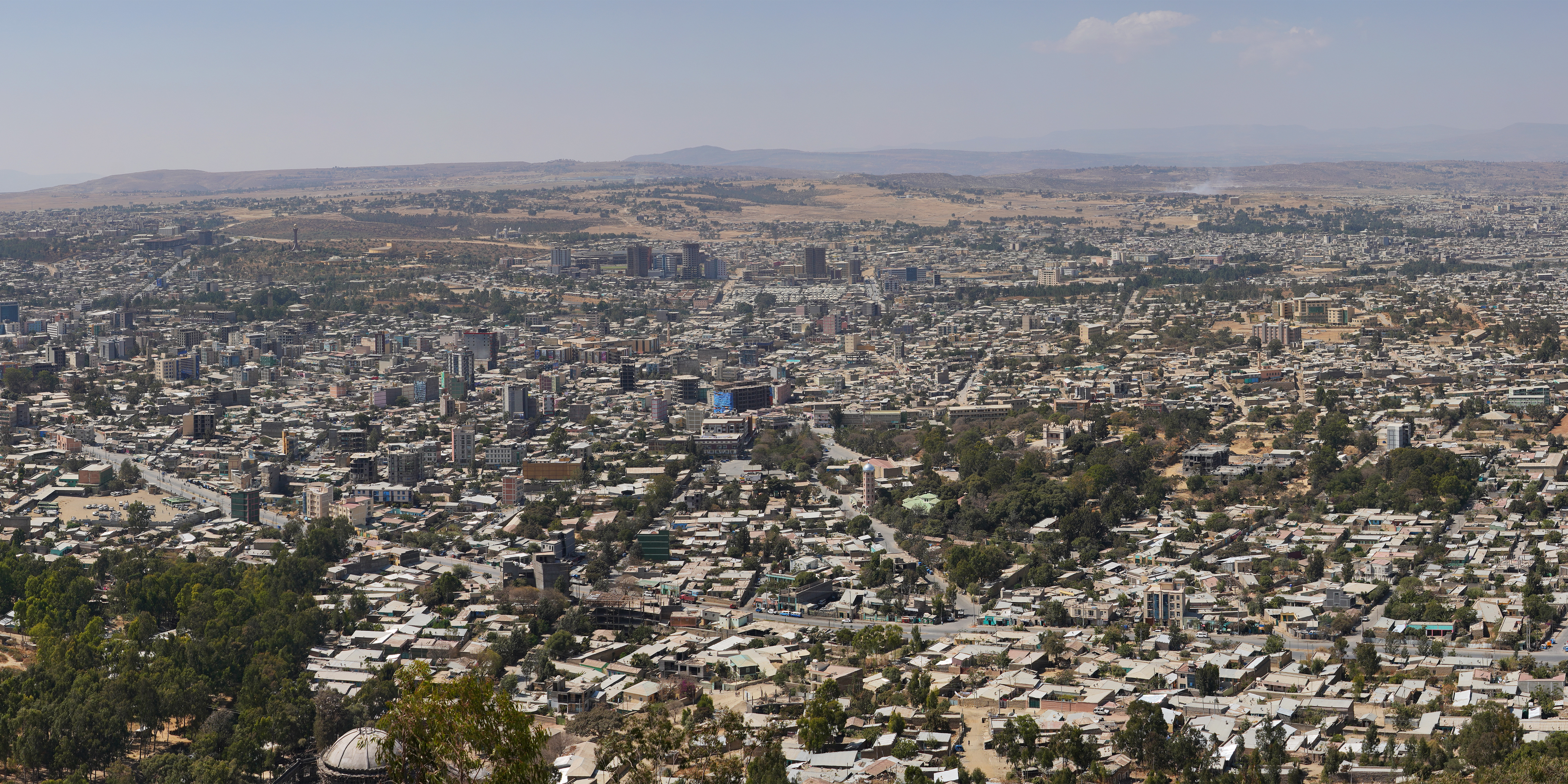
Mekelle, the capital of Tigray

- Maimekden (May Mekdan)
- Maychew
- Mek'ele

=== N ===
- Negash

=== R ===
- Rama

=== S ===
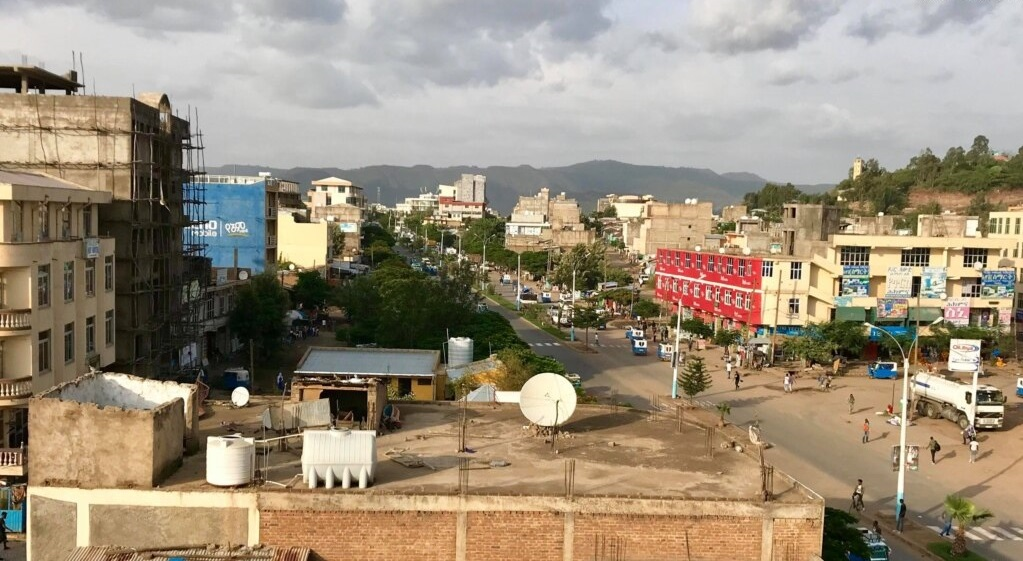
Shire

- Selekleka
- Sheraro
- Shire

=== W ===
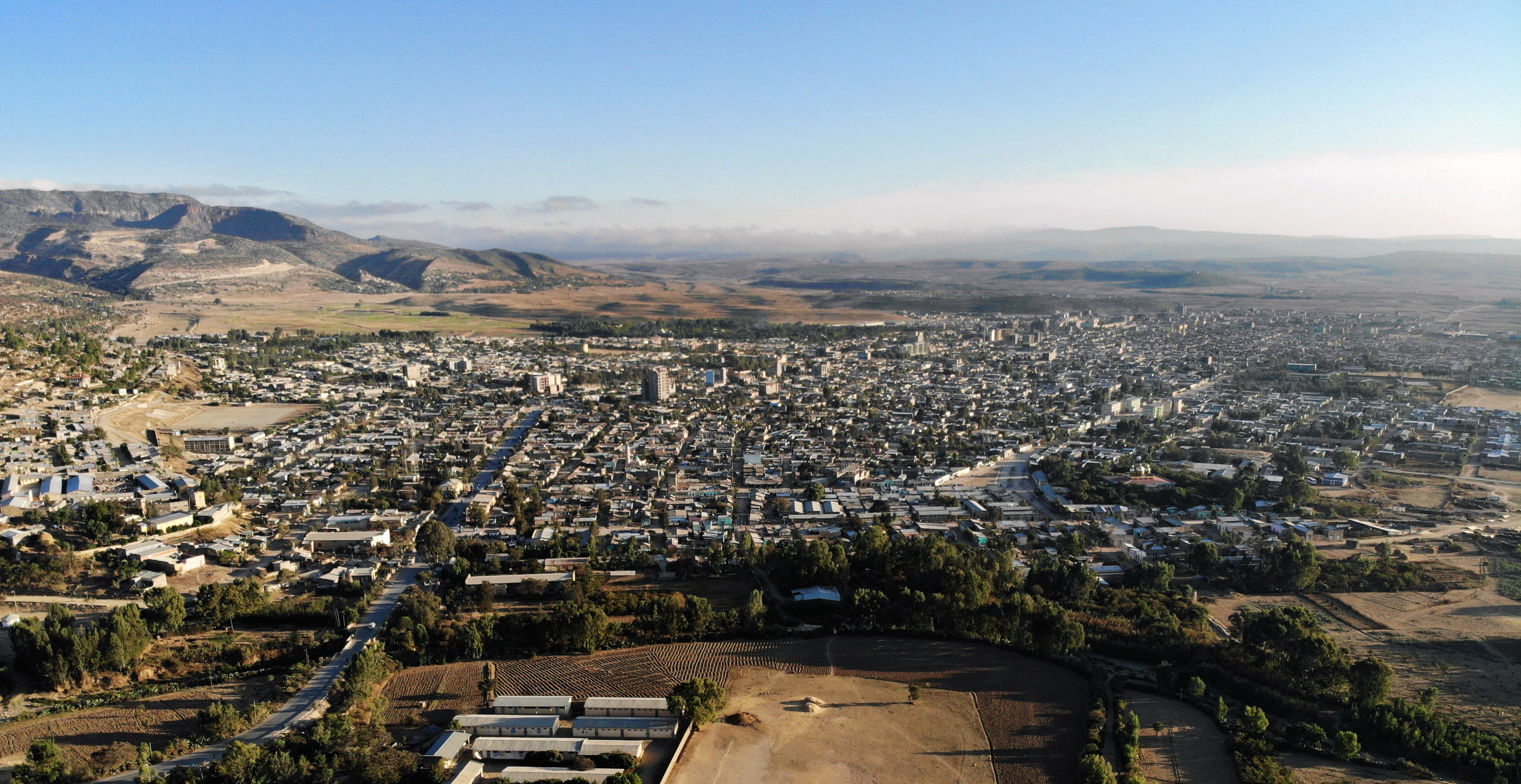
Wukro

- Waja
- Wukro

=== Y ===
- Yechila
- Yeha

== See also ==
- List of cities and towns in Ethiopia
- List of metropolitan areas in Africa
- List of cities in East Africa
- MENA
