= Hibret =

Hibret ሕብረት
- Town
- Location within Ethiopia
- Coordinates: 14.047315233441314°N 38.03292848247641°E
- Country: Ethiopia
- Region: Tigray
- Zone: Northwestern Zone
- Woreda: Hibret
- Elevation: 1,320.698 m (4,333.00 ft)

Population (2020)
  - Total: 10,604
- Time zone: UTC+3 (EAT)

Hibret (Ge'ez: ሕብረት), is a village town in Asgede district in the Tigray Region of Ethiopia located 52 km west of Shire in the way from Inda Aba Guna to Hitsats. The town is the administrative center of the Hibret subdistrict (tabia) home to more than 10,000 residents. During the Tigray war on 29 April 2021, more than 20 civilians were killed by the Ethiopian National Defence Forces in this village town.
