= Mayhansse =

Mayhansse ማይሓንሰ
- Town
- Location within Ethiopia
- Coordinates: 14.124464066133445°N 37.877296803735575°E
- Country: Ethiopia
- Region: Tigray
- Zone: Northwestern Zone
- Woreda: Mayhansse
- Elevation: 1,124.712 m (3,690.00 ft)

Population (2020)
  - Total: 8,000
- Time zone: UTC+3 (EAT)

Mayhansse (Ge'ez: ማይሓንሰ), is a town in Asgede district in the Tigray Region of Ethiopia located 60 km west of Shire in the highway to Dansha, Western zone Tigray. The town is the largest town in Asgede woreda (district) with population of 91,222 (as of 2020).
