= Battle of Shire (1989) =

Operation in the Ethiopian Civil War

- Part of the Ethiopian Civil War
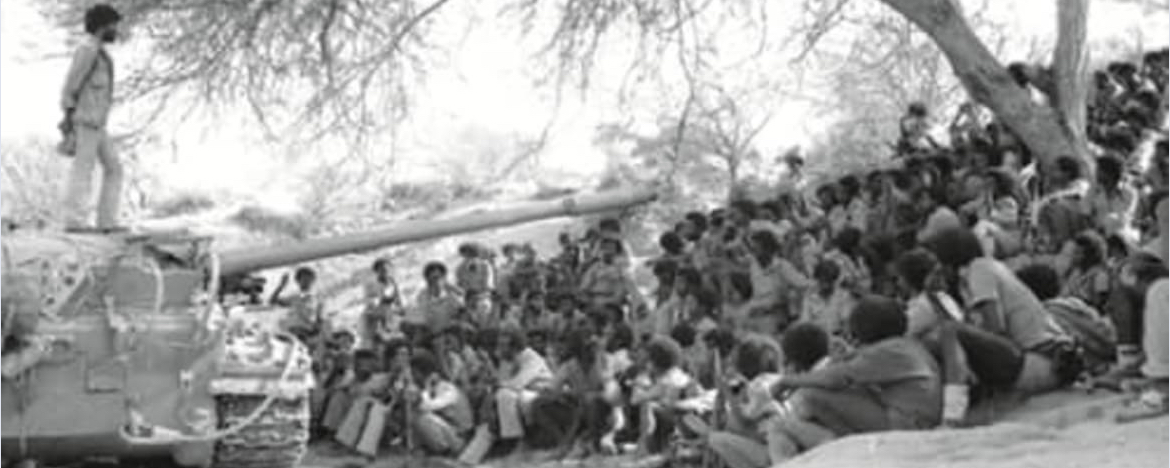
- TPLF tanks and militants after the battle
Date	8–19 February 1989
Location	Shire, Ethiopia
Result	TPLF victory

Belligerents
Ethiopia	(Tigray Region) TPLF

Commanders and leaders
(Ethiopia) Mulatu Negash	(Tigray Region) Samora Yunis

Strength
28,000	54,000

Casualties and losses
12,000 killed 14,000 captured	Unknown

The Battle of Shire was fought from February 8 to 19 February 1989, in and around the town of Shire, as part of the Ethiopian Civil War, and resulted in the destruction of the Ethiopian 604th Army Corps.

== Background ==
Following the Eritrean People's Liberation Front's (EPLF) victory at the Battle of Afabet, the Tigray People's Liberation Front (TPLF) quickly succeeded in overrunning many garrisons in Tigray, such as Shire Inda Selassie, Axum, Adwa, Adigrat, Wukro, and Maychew. In June 1988, the Ethiopian Third Revolutionary Army (TRA) led by General Mulatu Negash, launched an offensive titled "Operation Adwa" to clear the Tigray region of TPLF guerrillas. The Third Revolutionary Army's 604th Army Corps easily retook the towns of Wukro, Adigrat, Adwa and Axum and then attacked western Tigray, taking Selekleka and Shire Inda Selassie in early July and dispersed the rebels, killing 1,714 guerrillas and losing 1,071 men. The Third Revolutionary Army's 603rd Army Corps moved north from Gondar. However, the TPLF regrouped and finally engaged the Ethiopian army near Dansha in July, forcing them to retreat to Humera and killing 1,612 government troops, the TPLF then moved the bulk of its forces to the Sheraro area to face the 604th Corps. On August 3, the 604th Army Corps attacked the TPLF in Adi Hageray, although they managed to initially disperse the guerrillas from their original positions, on August 6 a rainy foggy day hampered air support and allowed the TPLF to counterattack the 604th, forcing them to retreat to Shire by the 11th. During this offensive, the army lost 8,482 men compared to the TPLF's 5,812 men, despite this, Mulatu Negash declared Operation Adwa a massive success in his report to Mengistu Haile Mariam.

After Operation Adwa, the TPLF positioned itself along key junctions in along the routes to Shire and resumed its hit and run tactics of harassing military convoys. Supplies for the 28,000 men of the TRA 604th Corps had to be delivered by air. The TPLF was estimated to be around 56,000 men and women, mainly zonal peasants. After the conclusion of Operation Adwa, a phase of inactivity ensued until the TPLF seized control of Rama on September 29, 1988. This capture disrupted the supply route of the 604th Corps from Asmara. The government, in response to the fall of Rama to the TPLF, formulated a fresh operational strategy called Operation Aksum. Operation Aksum began with the 9th and 16th Divisions moved to Chella, north of Selekleka. Despite the plan for a joint operation after the divisions converged at Chella, a significant gap allowed insurgents to launch separate attacks. After defeating the 16th Division and concentrating on the 9th Division, heavy losses prompted both divisions to retreat to Shire and Selekleka. To reinforce the 4th Division at Shire, the TRA transferred the 103rd Commando Division from Mekelle, while the 17th Division from Gondar and the 6th and 13th Mechanized Brigades from Wollo Province were moved to Mekelle. The withdrawal of the 17th Division allowed the TPLF to capture Debarq and Dabat on January 3, 1989.

== Battle ==
Despite the failure of Operation Aksum, Mulatu Negash still believed that there was a chance to reopen the Adwa-Asmara route. General Mulatu thus went ahead with the second phase of Operation Aksum. According to the plan of Operation Aksum II, the 16th Division would take control of Selekleka. Then, the 103rd Commando Division would sweep through the Selekleka-Aksum road to pave the way for the 9th Division, which could advance to Adwa. Operation Aksum II kicked off on February 8, 1989, under the direct command of General Mulatu, the 16th Division soon took control of Selekleka, the 103rd Commando Division commenced its journey from Selekleka towards Aksum. However, on February 10, 1989, insurgents launched an attack at Aqab Sa'at against the 22nd Brigade of the 16th Division and the 7th Brigade of the 9th Division. Rescue attempts for these two brigades proved unsuccessful, and the four brigades of the 103rd Commando Division were hastily ordered to return to Shire. One brigade from the 9th Division was tasked with safeguarding the road for the Commando Division's safe withdrawal. While advancing to Aksum, the 103rd Commando Brigade served as the vanguard unit. When the retreat order was issued, the 103rd Brigade became the last to return, lacking a rear guard. Isolated and attacked by insurgents, the brigade suffered heavy losses, with only about 450 out of approximately 1,200 troops returning to Shire. The division commander narrowly escaped a hand grenade attack, marking the ultimate failure of Operation Aksum II.

After the Aksum operations ended in failure, the 604th Corps gathered its four divisions around Shire and Selekleka. The 4th Division assumed the responsibility of defending Shire and the strategically important Mount Qoyasa. The 16th Division positioned itself at Selekleka. Meanwhile, the 103rd Commando Division was stationed at Af Gaga, and the 9th Division served as a reserve force for the 16th Division. The TPLF then attacked the 16th division at Selekleka, the rebels then captured Mount Qoyasa and the highway leading south of Selekleka, effectively surrounding the 16th and 9th Divisions. Of the 6,000-8,000 men trapped in Selekleka, less than half would manage to make it to Shire. At 0:200 hours on February 18, 1989, guerrillas initiated a close-in offensive against the 604th Corps, attacking from the south, north, and northeast. The primary assault originated from Addi Kokab, Enda Giorgis (north), and Mount Qoyaşa (northeast of Shire). The 4th Division managed to successfully defended its position. At this moment, General Mulatu, the head of the TRA's operations, and left for Mekelle, promising to send reinforcements. As the 4th Division withstood the TPLF offensive, the guerrillas turned against its reserve force, the 103rd Commando Division. The Commando Division was forced to retreat to the airport, exposing the 4th Division's rear defenses. Soon, the troops of the 9th and 16th Divisions, who had sustained heavy losses earlier fled to the airport, leaving the 4th Division exposed. Even then, the 4th Division continued fighting, unshaken by the retreat of friendly units.

The battle was finally lost when the TPLF took control of the strategic hill of Enda Kantiba on the southern outskirts of the town. Then, the 4th Division finally retreated to the airport. All attempts to turn the panic-stricken troops into a cohesive and effective combat force failed. The insurgents had already rushed to Inda Aba Guna to block the escape route to Gondar. The Battle of Shire was over by 18:00 February 19, 1989, this battle resulted in the deaths of 10,000 to 12,000 government soldiers and the capture of 14,309 men including Baratta Gamoraw, deputy commander of the TRA. Brigadier General Addis Agellachew, commander of the 604th Corps, and Brigadier General Haylu Kabbede died during the retreat. The fall of the town turned out to be a decisive victory for the TPLF and the second largest blow to the government after the Afabet disaster. However, around 2,000 government troops managed to escape to Gondar.

== Aftermath ==
After the defeat in Shire, Mengistu ordered the Ethiopian army to withdraw from Tigray, allowing the TPLF to occupy all of Tigray, including the capital Mekelle, by the end of February. Mengistu Haile Mariam was said to have been "shocked and bewildered" after hearing about the disaster in Shire, in a speech to the National Shengo he declared:

"A huge army has fallen, scattered, surrendered, within days and hours in a manner that is beyond belief. Quantity of weapons and property that will profoundly impact the unity and survivability of the state have fallen into enemy hands. It is no exaggeration to say that this lamentable episode will occupy a disgraceful place not only in the history of Ethiopia's struggles but also in world military history."

== See also ==
- Battle of Afabet
