= Sheraro massacre =

- Part of the Tigray war
- Location of Sheraro in the Tigray Region, Ethiopia Sheraro (Ethiopia)
- Location: 14°23′45″N 37°46′23″E; Sheraro, Tigray Region, Ethiopia
- Date: September 6-12, 2022
- Deaths: 40+
- Perpetrator: Eritrean Defence Forces

Between September 6 and 12, 2022, soldiers from the Eritrean Defence Forces (EDF) killed at least 40 civilians in the village of Sheraro, Tigray Region, Ethiopia.

== Background ==
During the Tigray war, which began in late 2020 after tensions between the separatist Tigray People's Liberation Front and Ethiopian president Abiy Ahmed boiled over, Adwa and other areas of western Tigray region became a hotspot of violence between the TPLF and the Ethiopian government. In November 2020, at the start of the war, Eritrean forces captured the town of Sheraro after the Tigrayan leaders of the town fled. At least 20 people were killed in Sheraro during the initial bombings by Eritrean forces.

On 14 September 2022, Eritrean and Ethiopian forces launched a joint offensive into southern and northern Tigray, attacking the cities of Adigrat and Shire, and capturing Alamata and Korem just days into the offensive. These joint offensives came at the cusp of a breakthrough in peace talks between Eritrea, Ethiopia, and the TPLF. During the offensives, EDF and ENDF forces carried out several attacks that killed hundreds of civilians in Mekelle and Adi Daero.

== Massacre ==
Before the offensive, Sheraro was under the control of fighters from the Tigray Defense Forces (TDF). An injured TDF fighter said that the group suffered significant losses when fleeing from Sheraro. Eritrean forces first started attempting to capture the city on September 6, and Tigrayan forces did not confirm their retreat from the city until September 13. During the battle for the city, Eritrean forces heavily shelled Sheraro, killing at least 4 people. One witness said that heavy shelling began in Sheraro on September 8 around 4:30 am. At least 40 civilians, including Eritrean refugees, were killed in extrajudicial killings by Eritrean soldiers in Sheraro during the first days of the occupation. Civilians were ordered by the soldiers to collect and bury slain Eritrean soldiers before being executed. At least 210,000 people were displaced from Sheraro, Tahtay Adiyabo, and Tsiliom by the end of September.
