= Hitsats =

Hitsats ሕፃፅ
- Town
- Location within Ethiopia
- Coordinates: 14.098674124833858°N 37.95993156714216°E
- Country: Ethiopia
- Region: Tigray
- Zone: Northwestern Zone
- Woreda: Hitsats
- Elevation: 1,087.222 m (3,567.00 ft)

Population (2020)
  - Total: 7,120
- Time zone: UTC+3 (EAT)

Hitsats (Ge'ez: ሕፃፅ), is a village town in Asgede district in the Tigray Region of Ethiopia located 48 km west of Shire in the Shire - Dedebit - Dansha highway.

The town is the administrative center of the Hitsats subdistrict (tabia) and the place of the Hitsats Refugee Camp. Following the genocidal war in Tigray in November 2020, more than 300 civilians were massacred by the Eritrean Defence Forces who entered supporting the Ethiopian National Defence Force.
