= Adi Daero =

Adi Daero ዓዲ ዳዕሮ
- Town
- Location within Ethiopia
- Coordinates: 14.312479478674936°N 38.17189751360551°E
- Country: Ethiopia
- Region: Tigray
- Zone: Northwestern Zone
- Woreda: Adi Daero town
- Elevation: 3,012 m (9,882 ft)

Population (2020)
  - Total: 21,134
- Time zone: UTC+3 (EAT)

Adi Daero (Ge'ez: ዓዲ ዳዕሮ), is a town in the Tigray Region of Ethiopia located at 977 km north of Addis Ababa and 278 km northwest of Mekelle along the highway which runs from Shire to Sheraro to Humera. The town is also the administrative center of the La'ilay Adiyabo woreda (district).

== Adi Daero Airstrike ==
On 4 October 2022, the Ethiopian National Defense Force launched an airstrike at a school housing internally displaced people in the town, killing more than 50 and injuring at least 70 others. According to Tigrayan authorities and some witnesses the death toll was at least 65. The attack is one of the deadliest in the Tigray War.
