= Adi Mehameday =

Town in Tigray Region, Ethiopia

Adi Mehameday ዓዲ መሓመዳይ Wehabit
- Village town
- Flag

- Location within Ethiopia
- Coordinates: 13°59′N 37°49′E
- Country: Ethiopia
- Region: Tigray
- Zone: Semien Mi'irabawi (Northwestern)
- Wereda: Asgede
- Elevation: 1,100 m (3,600 ft)

Population (2021)
  - Total: 9,548
- Time zone: UTC+3 (EAT)

Adi Mehameday (Tigrinya: ዓዲ መሓመዳይ, adi me'ha'me'day) is a small village town in Asgede wereda in the Northwestern Zone of Tigray Regional State of Ethiopia. Adi Mehameday is located about 373 kilometres (232 mi) North West of Mekelle.

Adi Mehameday is bordered along the south and southwest by the Tekezé River which separates the town from Tselemti and to the west by Tabia Dedebit. To the north is Deguadugugni, and to the east by May Tel River. Major village towns are Adi Mehameday, Adi Hilina, Sifra Mariyam, May Tselwadu.

== Demographics ==
Based on a 2021 unpublished census report, this town has a total population of 9548 out of which 4969 are male and 4578 are female. Most of the settlements are three to five individuals per household.

== Climate ==
Adi Mehameday is characterized as semiarid to arid climatic regions. The average annual temperature for the region, in general, varies from 24 - 29 °C. Records obtained show temperature maxima of 40 °C (104 °F) and minima of 15 °C (59 °F). November and December are the coldest months. There are two rainy periods: June to September with highest seasonal rainfall being 500 millimetres (20 in) and February to April is about 25 millimetres (0.98 in).

== Economy ==
Gum-resin produced and exported from Adi Mehameday.
