= Kisad Gaba =

Kisad Gaba ክሳድ ጋባ
- Town
- Location within Ethiopia
- Coordinates: 14.123351087481149°N 38.0961596204952°E
- Country: Ethiopia
- Region: Tigray
- Zone: Northwestern Zone
- Woreda: Kisad Gaba
- Elevation: 1,532.23 m (5,027.0 ft)
- Time zone: UTC+3 (EAT)

Kisad Gaba (Ge'ez: ክሳድ ጋባ) is a town in the Tigray Region of Ethiopia located at 272 km northwest of Mekelle, along the highway which runs from Shire to Dansha, Western Zone, Tigray. The town is also the administrative center of the Asgede woreda (district) with a population of 91,222 (as of 2020).

== Economy ==
The town's economy is agriculturally focused.
