= Selekleka =

Selekleka ሰለኽለኻ
- Location within Ethiopia
- Coordinates: 14°07′N 38°29′E
- Country: Ethiopia
- Region: Tigray
- Zone: Semien Mi'irabawi (North Western)
- Elevation: 1,972 m (6,470 ft)

Population (2005)
  - Total: 7,391
- Time zone: UTC+3 (East Africa Time)

Selekleka (Tigrinya: ሰለኽለኻ; also transliterated as Selekhlekha, Selekhlekha or Selekh Lekha) is a town in North Western Zone, Tigray Region, Ethiopia. Located in the Semien Mi'irabawi (North Western) Zone of the Tigray Region, this town has a latitude and longitude of 14°07′N 38°29′E with an elevation of 2107 meters above sea level. It is the administrative center of Medebay Zana woreda.

This town serves as the primary market center for much of the surrounding area. Sorghum and finger millet are brought from the lowland portions of La'ilay and Tahtay Adiyabo for sale.

== History ==
Selekh Lekha is mentioned in the Royal Chronicle as where Ras Mikael Sehul and his puppet Emperor Tekle Haymanot II spent one night in June 1770 during their campaign through Tigray. The chronicler describes the place as "a holy land where there is no breath of scandal."

Two British hunters passed through Selekh Lekha and its neighbor Beles in January 1923, later describing the settlements in unflattering and dismissive words. In February 1936, during the opening moves of the Second Italian-Abyssinian War, the Blackshirt "21st April" Division, with the "Gavininana" and "Gran Sasso" Divisions clashed with the soldiers of Ras Imru Haile Selassie near Selekh Lekha, as part of the Battle of Shire.

During the Italian occupation, a leprosarium was built in Selekh Lekha; this was abandoned by its Italian staff on 30 March 1941, and later pillaged and destroyed by the locals. The town was later the center of heavy fighting between the 604th Army Corps of the Derg's Third Revolutionary Army and troops of the Tigrayan People's Liberation Front during the Battle of Shire, which ended on 19 February 1989 with a crushing defeat for the Derg.

== Demographics ==
Based on figures from the Central Statistical Agency in 2005, Selekh Lekha has an estimated total population of 7,391, of whom 3,529 are men and 3,862 are women. The 1994 census reported it had a total population of 4252 of whom 1,879 were males and 2,373 were females.
