= Beles =

Beles may refer to:

- Beles, Ethiopia, a tabiya or municipality in the Tahtay Koraro district of the Tigray Region of Ethiopia. The tabiya centre is Beles village itself.
- Beles River and Gilgil Beles, a river and a town in Metekel Zone of Benishangul-Gumuz region of Ethiopia
- Beles Hydroelectric Power Plant in Ethiopia
- A name for the Opuntia ficus-indica fruit in Ethiopia and Eritrea
- Beleš (Serbian: Белеш), a village in Serbia
- Belasica (Beles), a mountain between Greece, Bulgaria and the Republic of Macedonia
