= May Tsebri =

May Tsebri ማይ ፀብሪ
- Town
- Location within Ethiopia
- Coordinates: 13.561605056995115°N 38.1313924146128°E
- Country: Ethiopia
- Region: Tigray
- Zone: North Western Zone, Tigray
- Woreda: May Tebri Town
- Elevation: 1,438 m (4,718 ft)

Population (2020)
  - Total: 50,000
- Time zone: UTC+3 (EAT)

May Tsebri (Tigrinya: ማይ ፀብሪ), is a town in the Tselemti zone of Ethiopia located at 873 km north of Addis Ababa and 329 km west of Mekelle along the highway which runs from Shire to Gondar.from Gondar to maitsebri is 210 km The town is also the administrative center of the Tselemti special region .

== Economy ==
The town's economy is agriculturally focused.
