= Medebay Zana =

District in Tigray Region, Ethiopia

Coordinates: 14°00′N 38°25′E

Medebay Zana መደባይ ዛና
- Woreda
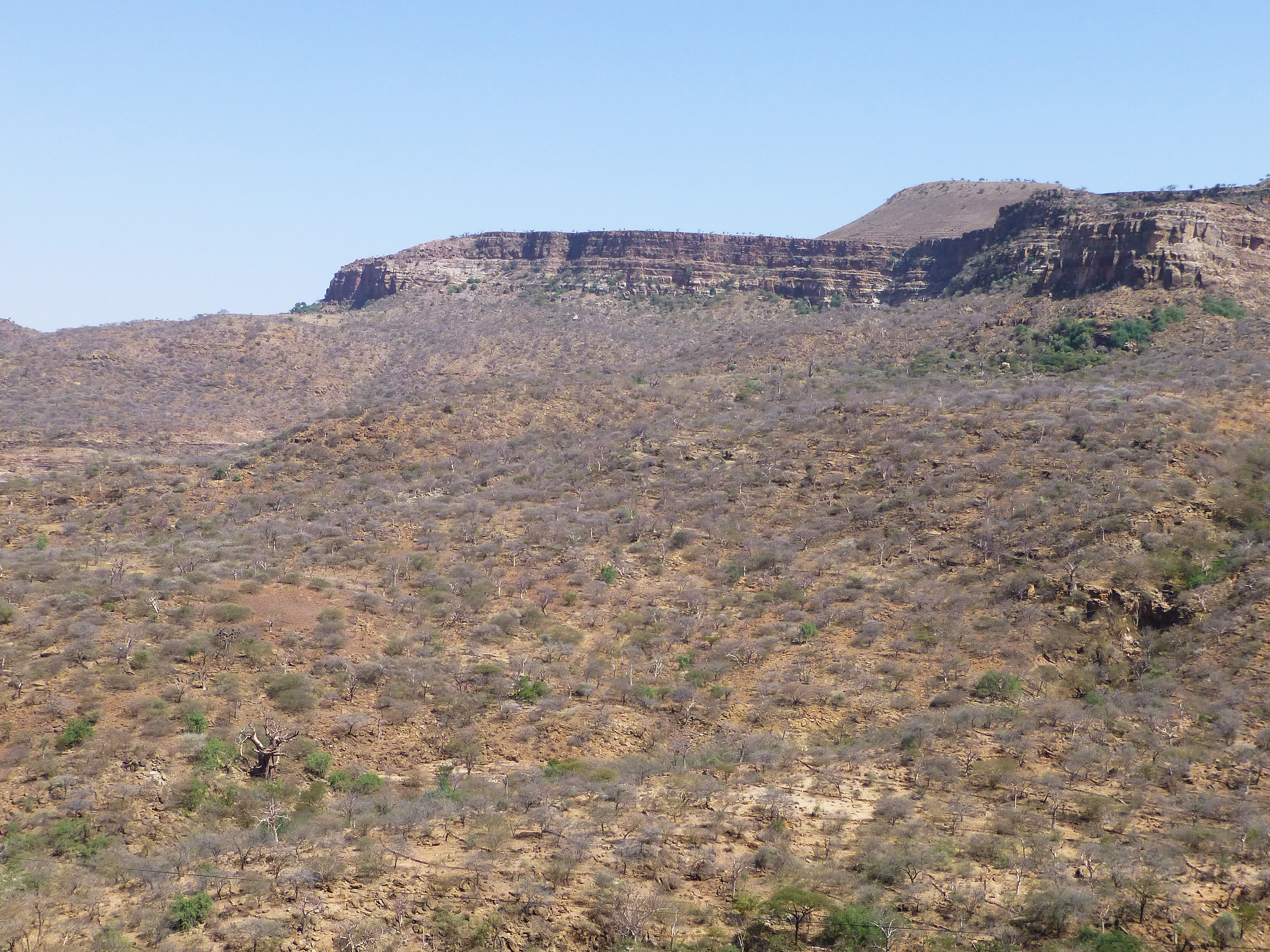

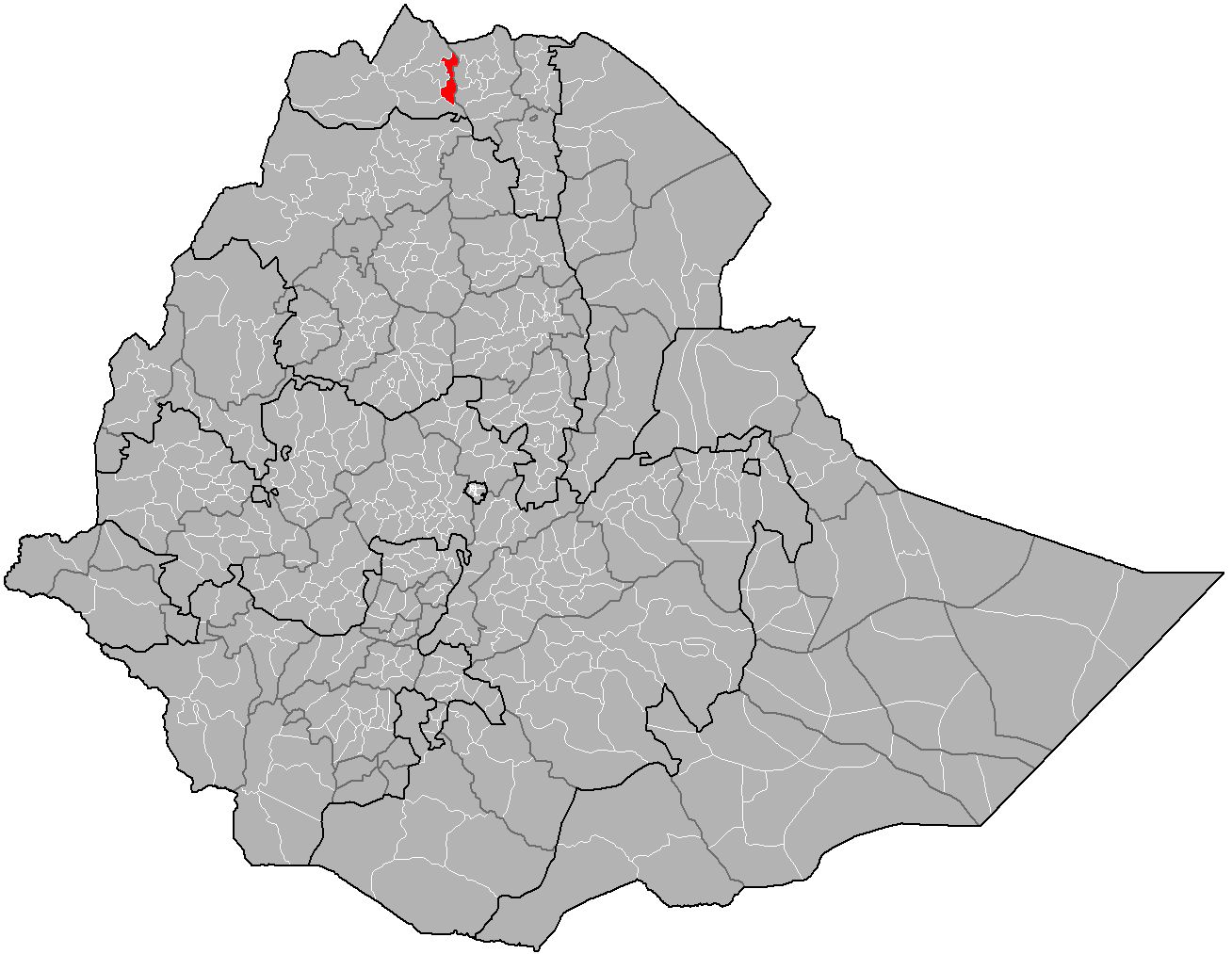
- Country: Ethiopia
- Region: Tigray
- Zone: Semien Mi'irabawi Zone

Area
  - Total: 2,685.12 km^{2} (1,036.73 sq mi)

Population (2007)
  - Total: 125,028

Medebay Zana (Tigrinya: መደባይ ዛና) is an Ethiopian District or woreda in the Tigray Region of Ethiopia. Part of the Semien Mi'irabawi Zone, Medebay Zana is bordered on the south by the Tekeze River which separates Tahtai Adyabo from Tselemti, on the southwest by Asgede Tsimbla, on the northwest by Tahtay Koraro, on the north by La'ilay Adyabo, and on the east by the Mehakelegnaw (Central) Zone. The administrative center of this woreda is Selekhlekha; other towns in Medebay Zana include Debre Kerbe.

== Demographics ==
Based on the 2007 national census conducted by the Central Statistical Agency of Ethiopia (CSA), this woreda has a total population of 125,028, an increase of 97,237 over the 1994 census, of whom 61,977 are men and 63,051 women; 10,526 or 8.42% are urban inhabitants. With an area of 2,685.12 square kilometers, Medebay Zana has a population density of 46.56 people per square kilometer, which is greater than the Zone average of 40.21. A total of 27,689 households were counted in this woreda, resulting in an average of 4.52 persons to a household, and 26,918 housing units. The majority of the inhabitants said they practiced Ethiopian Orthodox Christianity, with 98.24% reporting that as their religion, while 1.74% of the population were Muslim.

The 1994 national census reported a total population for this woreda of 97,237, of whom 47,973 were men and 49,264 were women; 6,304 or 6.48% of its population were urban dwellers. The largest ethnic group reported in Medebay Zena was the Tigrayan (99.89%), and Tigrinya was spoken as a first language by 99.93%. The majority of the inhabitants practiced Ethiopian Orthodox Christianity, with 97.82% reporting that as their religion, while 1.89% were Muslim. Concerning education, 10.15% of the population were considered literate, which is greater than the Zone average of 9.01%; 10.34% of the children aged 7–12 were in primary school, which is less than the Zone average of 11.34%; 0.31% of the children aged 13–14 were in junior secondary school, which is also less than the Zone average of 0.65%; and 0.08% of the children aged 15–18 were in senior secondary school, which is less than the Zone average of 0.51%. Concerning sanitary conditions, about 49% of the urban houses and 9% of all houses had access to safe drinking water at the time of the census; about 11% of the urban and 4% of all houses had toilet facilities.

== Agriculture ==
A sample enumeration performed by the CSA in 2001 interviewed 23,161 farmers in this woreda, who held an average of 0.77 hectares of land. Of the 17,723 hectares of private land surveyed, 94.58% was under cultivation, 0.34% pasture, 2.52% fallow, 0.1% woodland, and 2.47% was devoted to other uses. For the land under cultivation in this woreda, 86.96% is planted in cereals, 5.94% in pulses, 0.93% in oilseeds, 0.34% in vegetables, and 0.14% in root crops. The number of hectares planted in fruit trees is missing. 79.51% of the farmers both raise crops and livestock, while 19.03% only grow crops and 1.46% only raise livestock. Land tenure in this woreda is distributed amongst 85.61% owning their land, and 13.21% rent; the numbers for those who held their land under other forms of tenure are missing.

== 2020 woreda reorganisation ==
In 2020 woreda Medebay Zana became inoperative and its territory belongs to the following new woredas:

- Selekleka woreda
- Zana woreda
