= 103rd Commando Division =

Military unit in Ethiopia

- 103ኛ የኮማንዶ ክፍል
- Active: January 1987 – May 1989
- Country: People's Democratic Republic of Ethiopia
- Type: Commando
- Size: Division
- Part of: (Ethiopia) Ethiopian National Defense Force
- Garrison/HQ: Bahir Dar
- Engagements: Ethiopian Civil War; Battle of Shire (1989)

Commanders
- Notable commanders: Colonel Getahun Wolde Giorgis

The 103rd Commando Division (Amharic: 103ኛ የኮማንዶ ክፍል, romanized: lit, lit. '103nya yekomanido kifili') were the commando forces of the Ethiopian Ground Forces under the People's Democratic Republic of Ethiopia. It was activated and began training in January 1987. It was part of the 604th Corps and was described as "the cream of the Ethiopian Army".

== Creation ==
In early 1987, the government began the process of expanding commando units. The division was created on 13 January 1987, with at its head Colonel Getahun Wolde Giorgis. It was based out of Bahir Dar, Amhara Region with a potential capacity of 10,000 commandos. After initial recruitment, training began at the Harar Military Academy, before commando training began at Hawassa and later at Bahir Dar.

== Operations ==
In 1989, the Defence Council sent the 103rd to take part in the defence of the capital during the Fall of Addis Ababa during the Ethiopian Civil War. It also took part in the battles for Axum.

In Tigray, the 103rd Commando Division was to provide the government's last hope in keeping Tigray. These attempts were repulsed on 19 February 1989, the division was defeated in and around Shire by the Tigray People's Liberation Front.

== Personnel ==
The 103rd during its existence was often seen as a victim of poor command, as it was mostly made up of conscripts and fresh militiamen. General Demissie Bulto, who was involved in the 1989 Ethiopian coup d'état attempt, had his mutilated body dragged in the streets of Asmara by half-drunk commandos. Major Bogale was a brigade commander in the division.
