= Bele =

Bele may refer to:

- Bele language
- Bale Robe, town and separate woreda in south-central Ethiopia
- Bele (Wolaita), administrative centre of Kindo Koysha, woreda in Wolaita, Ethiopia
- Bele, Saint-Louis-du-Sud, Haiti, a village in the Aquin arrondissement of Haiti
- Bele, a village in Zapod, Kukës, Albania
- Jean Marie Okwo Bele (born 1957), Congolese physician
- Bele, a half-white, half-black character in "Let That Be Your Last Battlefield", an episode of Star Trek
- In the cult of Thuggee, a place for murdering travelers

== See also ==
- Bélé, a folk song and dance from Dominica
- Bèlè, Haitian Creole name of Bel Air, Haiti
- Beles (disambiguation)
