= Shire in the Tigray war =

Aspect of the Tigray War

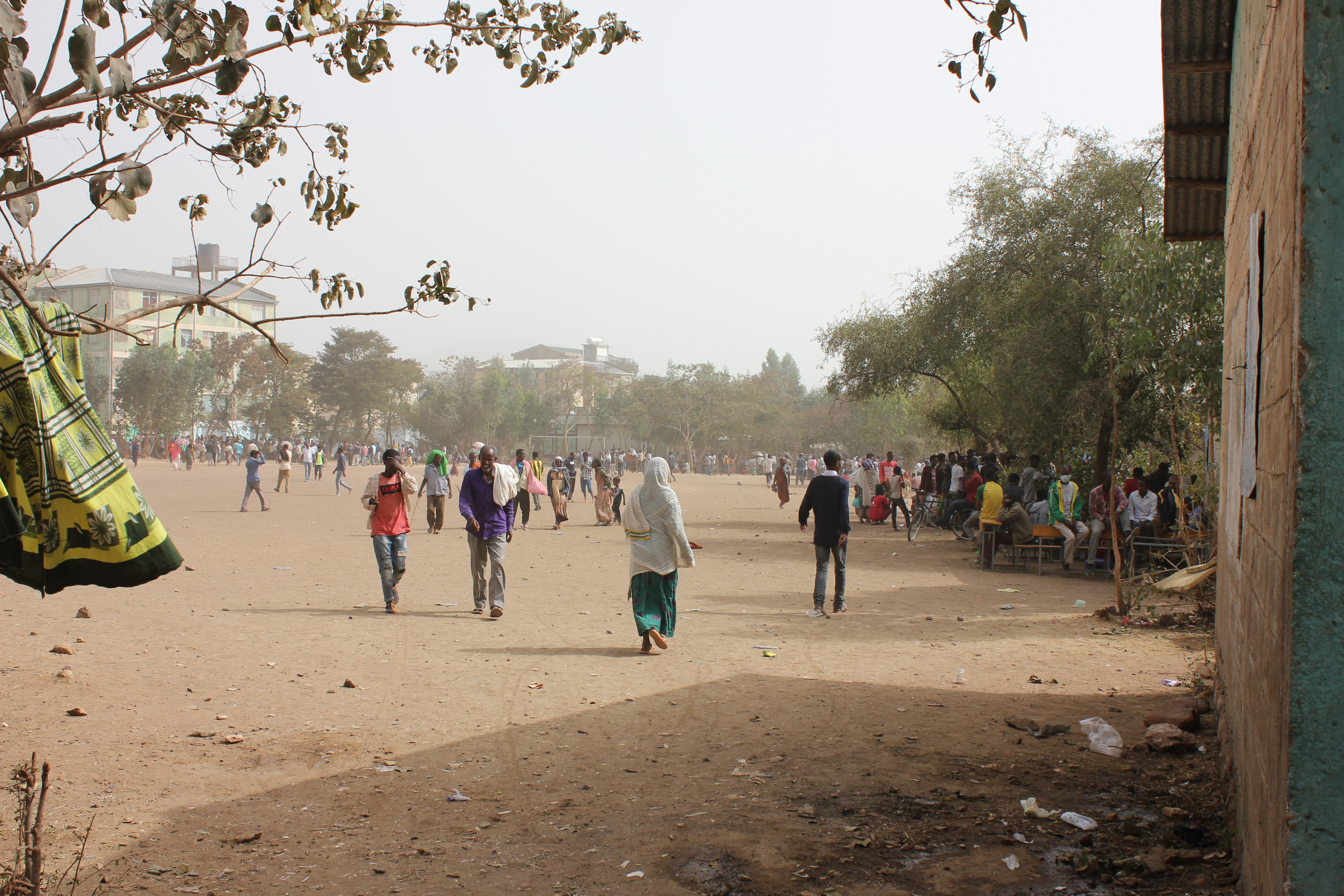
IDP camp in Shire, April 2021.

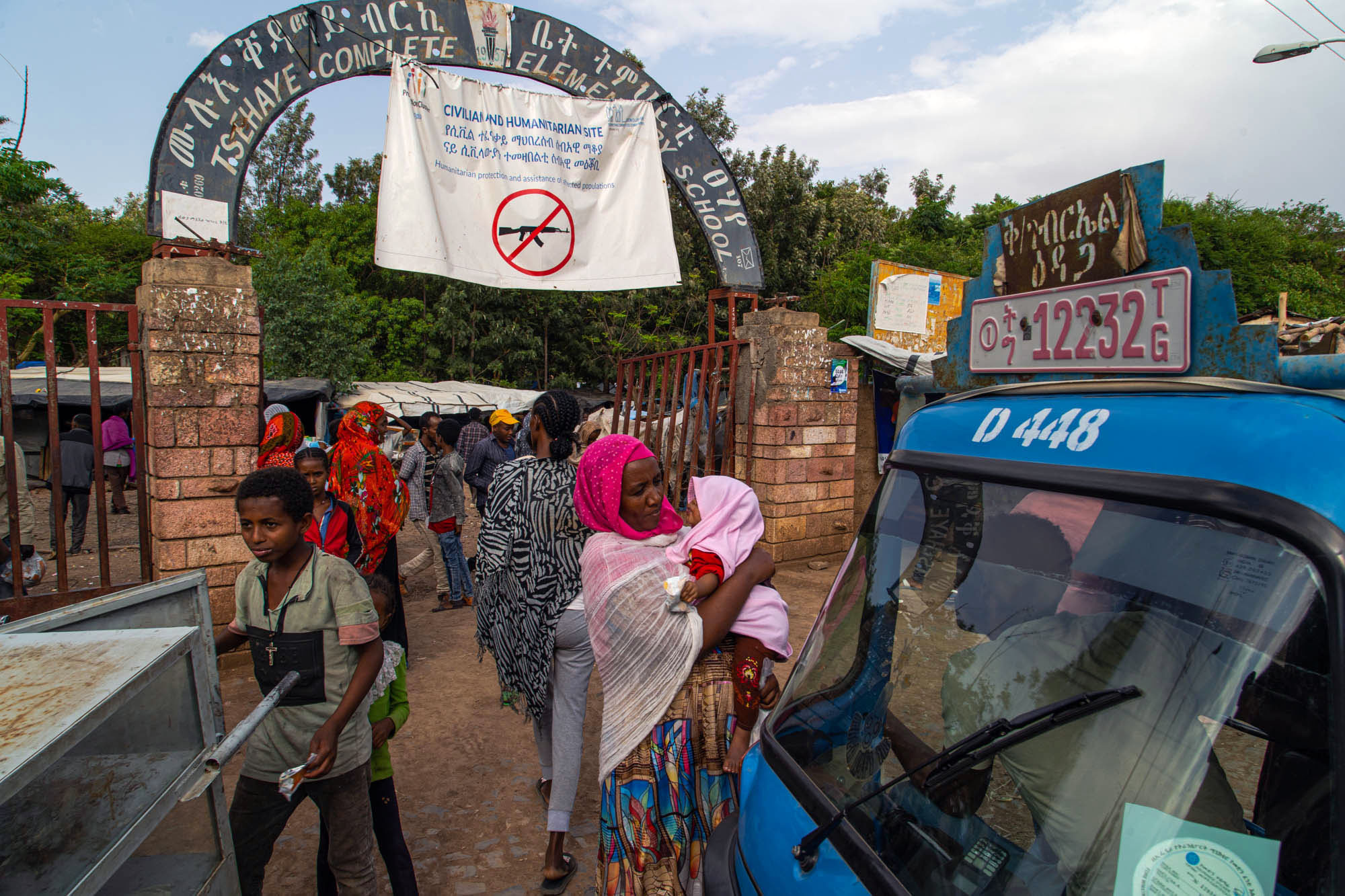
Entrance of a crowded school that was converted into a camp for displaced families, 11 June 2021.

The town of Shire was notable in the Tigray War for its role as a major centre of internally displaced people, for the shelling of civilians, for being looted, and for massacres in November 2020 and February 2021.

== Internally displaced people ==
Shire became a major centre for internally displaced people (IDPs) and humanitarian aid distribution during the Tigray War. Soon after the Northern Command attacks, when armed fighting started in the federal–Tigrayan conflict, thousands of people fleeing from the fighting to the west arrived in Shire. In December 2020, when Shire was controlled by the ENDF, Shire residents accepting wheat as food aid were required to sign for twice the amount that they received, or else receive no food. Much of the wheat was transported by the EDF to Eritrea. From 4–8 March 2021, 5,000 IDPs arrived. Oliver Behn of Médecins Sans Frontières described the new arrivals as being "in very bad conditions ... very exhausted, dehydrated, skinny". In March, Shire was considered to be a humanitarian base, with 16,000 IDPs hosted in three schools converted into camps. One refugee described having "survived on just leaves for a month while she hid in a forest".

By June 2021, Shire was the town in Tigray Region hosting the highest number of IDPs, out of the total estimated 1,950,000 IDPs at the time.

== Shelling and looting ==
According to Human Rights Watch (HRW), 10 civilians were killed in shelling of Shire on 17 November 2020. Tigray special forces were not present in Shire at the time according to residents. The victims' bodies, showing shrapnel wounds, were laid outside Suhul hospital for identification. The Ethiopian National Defense Force (ENDF) was in control of Shire by 18 November. HRW called the shelling "unlawful" and stated that "indiscriminate attacks, and attacks expected to cause greater harm to civilians than the anticipated military gain" would constitute war crimes. According to a witness who spoke to Tghat, "factories, hotels, a mosque, churches, and condominium buildings" were destroyed by the ENDF and Eritrean Defence Forces (EDF) after they entered Shire. A resident stated to The Guardian that "All government assets have been destroyed and looted".

== Massacres ==
Massacres of civilians in Shire including the killing of 13 people on 15 November 2020, of 200 people by the ENDF and EDF on 17 November following the entry of the two forces into Shire, and 10 on 15 February 2021. Residents attributed the 17 November executions primarily to the EDF, describing the victims as having been "slaughtered like chickens". The corpses were left to be "eaten by hyenas".

== See also ==
- Battle of Shire (2022)
