= Dedebit (town) =

Town in Tigray Region, Ethiopia

Dedebit ደደቢት
- Town
- Location in Ethiopia
- Coordinates: 14.0711°N 37.7623°E
- Country: Ethiopia
- Region: Tigray
- Zone: North Western
- Elevation: 957 m (3,140 ft)
- Time zone: UTC+3 (EAT)

Dedebit (Tigrinya: ደደቢት, de'de'bit) is a small village town in Asgede wereda in the Northwestern Zone of Tigray Regional State of Ethiopia. Dedebit is located about 361 kilometres (224 mi) North West of Mekelle. The town is bordered along the south by Adi Mehameday, southwest and west by the Tekezé River which separates the village from Qorarit town, to the north by Tahtay Adiyabo woreda and to the east by Deguaduguigni. The administrative center of the village is also called Dedebit.

The town is known for being the place where the Tigray People's Liberation Front (TPLF), the armed movement that overthrew the Derg military dictatorship, was formed.

During the Tigray War, on 7 January 2022, an airstrike by the Ethiopian Air Force targeted a camp of an internally displaced people in Dedebit, killing nearly 60 civilians; this act has been called a war crime by the UN and Human Rights Watch.

== Demographics ==
Based on a 2021 unpublished census report, this town has a total population of 6376 out of which 3327 are male and 3049 are female. Most of the settlements are three to five individuals per household.
