= Beles, Ethiopia =

Beles በለስ
- Location within Ethiopia Beles (Ethiopia)
- Coordinates: 14.06838°N 38.40558°E
- Country: Ethiopia
- Region: Tigray
- Zone: Semien Mi'irabawi Zone
- Woreda: Tahtay Koraro
- Time zone: UTC+3 (EAT)

Beles is a tabiya or municipality in the Tahtay Koraro district of the Tigray Region of Ethiopia. The tabiya centre is Beles village itself.

== Geography ==
The tabiya includes the villages of Beles, Meskelo, Chguarid, Adi Keshi and others.

=== Livelihood ===
The population lives essentially from crop farming, supplemented with off-season work in nearby towns. The land is dominated by farmlands which are clearly demarcated and are cropped every year. Hence the agricultural system is a permanent upland farming system.

=== Population ===
The tabiya centre of Beles holds a few administrative offices and some small shops. The main other populated places in the tabia are Meskelo, Chguarid, Adi Keshi and others.

=== Religion and church ===
Most inhabitants are Orthodox Christians.
