= Adi Gebru =

Village in Tigray Region, Ethiopia

Adi Gebru ዓዲ ገብሩ አዲ ገብሩ
- Village
- Interactive map of Adi Gebru
- Coordinates: 13°48′N 38°13′E
- Country: Ethiopia
- Region: Tigray
- Woreda: Tsimbla

Adi Gebru (Tigrinya: ዓዲ ገብሩ; Amharic: አዲ ገብሩ) is a village and populated place located in the Tsimbla woreda within the Tigray Region in Ethiopia.

== History ==
According to the record "Local History of Ethiopia", Adi Gebru was the administrative centre of a sub-district in 1964, recording the presence of a church dedicated to Abuna Aregawi in the locality and a school. That same primary school in 1968 had 83 pupils, comprising 51 boys and 32 girls, and two teachers. In that same year the locality was also within Shire awraja, an administrative division of the former Ethiopian system.

On 8 October 2026, during the 2026 Ethiopian offensive, TPLF fighters withdrew from the village and the ENDF occupied the village.
