= Tsimbla =

District in Tigray Region, Ethiopia

Coordinates: 14°00′N 38°00′E

Tsimbla ፅምብላ
- Woreda
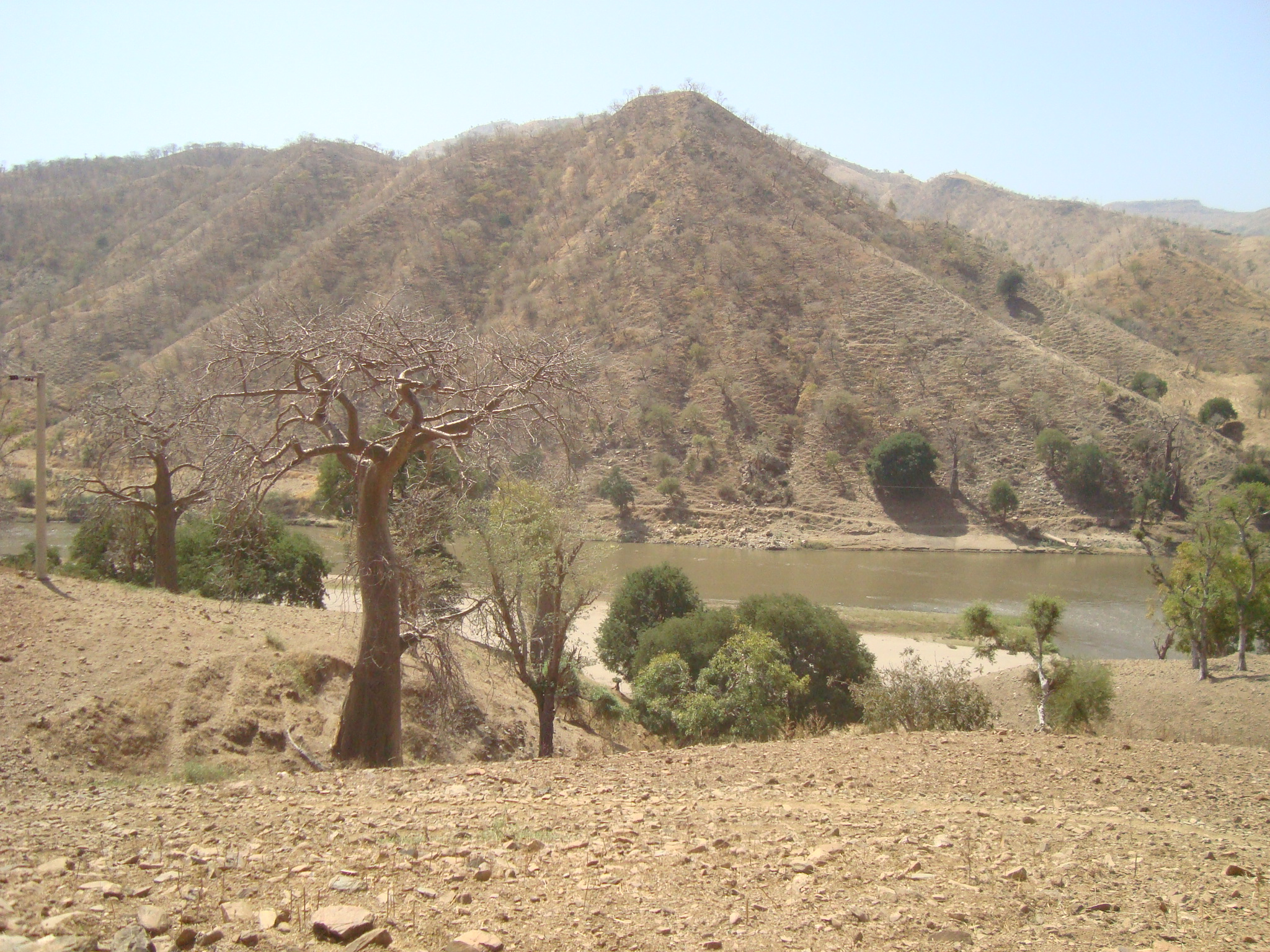

- Country: Ethiopia
- Region: Tigray
- Zone: Semien Mi'irabawi

Area
  - Total: 2,815.05 km^{2} (1,086.90 sq mi)

Population (2007)
  - Total: 135,621

Tsimbla (Tigrinya: ፅምብላ) is a woreda in Tigray Region, Ethiopia. Part of the Semien Mi'irabawi Zone, Tsimbla is bordered along the south by the Tekeze River which separates the woreda on the south from Tselemti and to the west by the Asgede, then on the northwest by Tahtay Adyabo, on the north by La'ilay Adiyabo, on the northeast by Tahtay Koraro, and on the east by Medebay Zana. The administrative center of this woreda is in Inda Aba Guna, a separate town; other towns in Tsimbla include Adi Gebru and Debre Abai.

== Overview ==
Landmarks include the monastery of Debre Abai, which was founded by Saint Samuel of Waldebba.

Located in this woreda is Dedebit, where the Tigrayan People's Liberation Front established their first military base in February 1975.

Tsimbla, was selected by the Ministry of Agriculture and Rural Development in 2004 as an area for voluntary resettlement for farmers from overpopulated areas. Along with Tsegede, which was the other woreda selected in Tigray that year, Tsimbla received that year a total of 24,000 heads of households and 96,000 total family members.

== Demographics ==
Based on the 2007 Census conducted by the Central Statistical Agency of Ethiopia (CSA), this woreda has a total population of 135,621, an increase of 96,115 over the 1994 national census, of whom 69,143 are men and 66,478 women; 10,111 or 7.46% are urban inhabitants. With an area of 2,815.05 square kilometers, Tsimbla has a population density of 48.18, which is greater than the Zone average of 40.21 persons per square kilometer. A total of 29,677 households were counted in this woreda, resulting in an average of 4.57 persons to a household, and 28,574 housing units. The majority of the inhabitants said they practiced Ethiopian Orthodox Christianity, with 97.51% reporting that as their religion, while 2.47% of the population were Muslim. The 1994 national census reported a total population for this woreda of 96,115, of whom 49,321 were men and 46,794 were women; 7,048 or 7.33% of its population were urban dwellers. The largest ethnic group reported in Asigede Tsimbela was the Tigrayan (99.21), and Tigrinya was spoken as a first language by 99.57%. The majority of the inhabitants practiced Ethiopian Orthodox Christianity, with 97.76% reporting that as their religion, while 2.17% were Muslim. Concerning education, 7.02% of the population were considered literate, which is less than the Zone average of 9.01%; 9.19% of the children aged 7–12 were in primary school, which is less than the Zone average of 11.34%; a negligible number of the children aged 13–14 were in junior secondary school, which is also less than the Zone average of 0.65%; and a negligible number of children aged 15–18 were in senior secondary school, which is less than the Zone average of 0.51%. Concerning sanitary conditions, about 24% of the urban houses and 9% of all houses had access to safe drinking water at the time of the census; about 9% of the urban and 4% of all houses had toilet facilities.

== Agriculture ==
A sample enumeration performed by the CSA in 2001 interviewed 21,495 farmers in this woreda, who held an average of 1.27 hectares of land. Of the 27,406 hectares of private land surveyed, 88.92% was under cultivation, 2.5% pasture, 6.86% fallow, one hectare in woodland, and 1.73% was devoted to other uses. For the land under cultivation in this woreda, 80.34% was planted in cereals, 2.17% in pulses, 5.85% in oilseeds, 0.41% in vegetables, and none in root crops. A total of 6 hectares was planted in fruit trees, while 13 hectares were planted in gesho. 88.15% of the farmers both raised crops and livestock, while 8.51% only grew crops and 3.34% only raised livestock. Land tenure in this woreda is distributed amongst 85.61% owning their land, and 16.19% renting; none were reported as holding their land under other forms of tenure.

== 2020 woreda reorganisation ==
Tsimbla was separated from the Asgede Tsimbla woreda in 2020 and became a separate woreda along with Asgede woreda and Inda Abaguna town.
