= Dima, Tigray =

Town in Tigray Region, Ethiopia

Coordinates: 13°29′N 37°20′E

Dima is a town in northern Ethiopia. It is located in the Mirabawi Zone of the Tigray Region.

Dima was the base for the nascent Tigrayan People's Liberation Front (TPLF), who arrived there late in 1975. The TPLF held its first 'Fighters Congress' in the town on 18 February 1976. It was attended by the entire membership of about 170 people, who elected a Central Committee.

Based on figures from the Central Statistical Agency in 2005, Dima has an estimated total population of 902, of whom 498 are men and 404 are women. The 1994 census reported it had a total population of 513, of whom 265 were men and 248 were women. It is one of two towns in Tselemti woreda.
