= La'ilay Adiyabo =

District in Tigray Region, Ethiopia

Coordinates: 14°20′N 38°15′E

La'ilay Adiyabo ላዕላይ ኣድያቦ
- Woreda
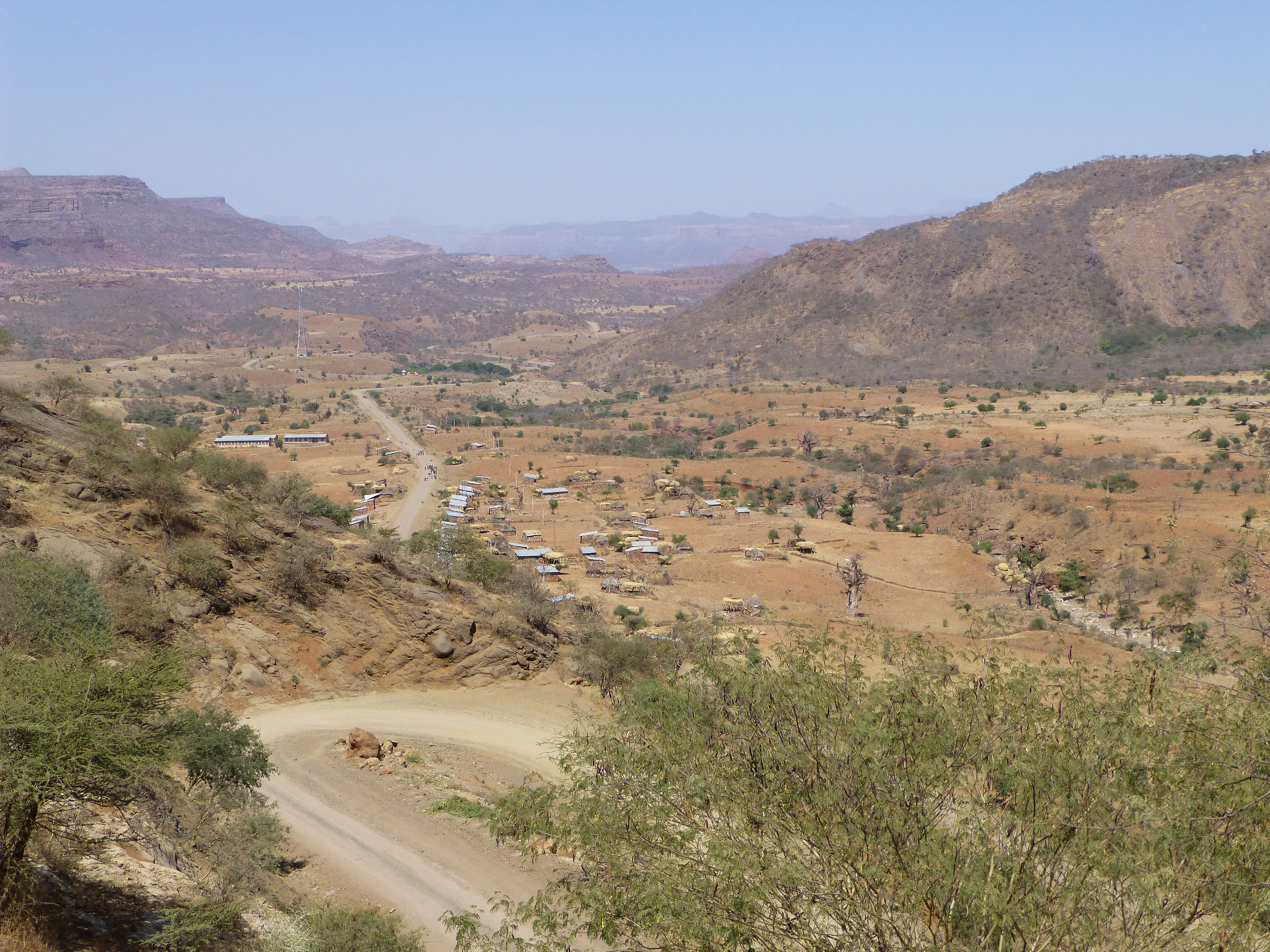

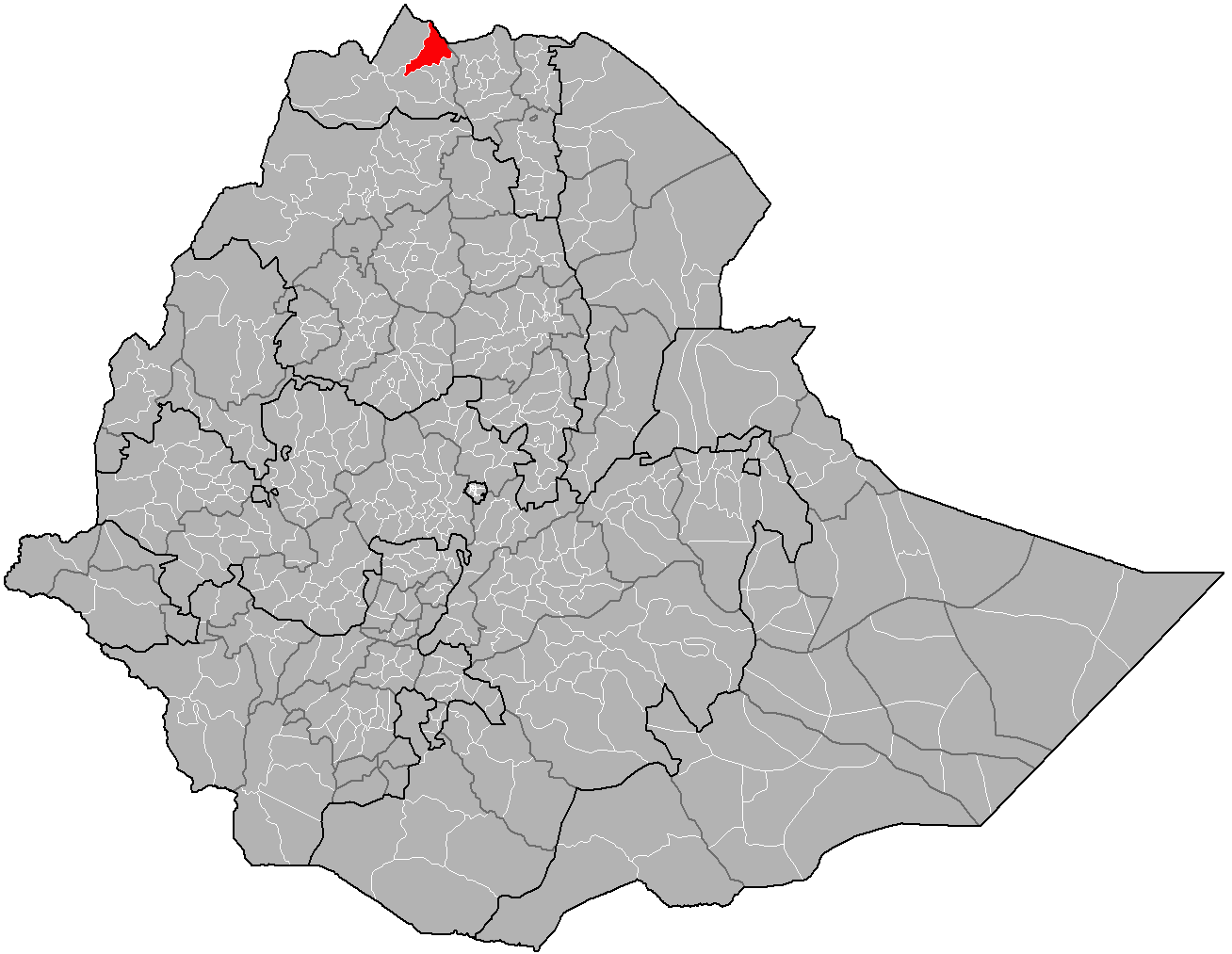
- Country: Ethiopia
- Region: Tigray
- Zone: North Western

Area
  - Total: 2,809.29 km^{2} (1,084.67 sq mi)

Population (2007)
  - Total: 113,836

La'ilay Adiyabo (Tigrinya: ላዕላይ ኣድያቦ, lit. 'Upper Adiyabo') is a woreda in the Tigray Region of Ethiopia. Part of the North Western Zone, La'ilay Adiyabo is bordered on the south by Tahtay Koraro, on the southwest by Asigede Tsimbela, on the northwest by Tahtay Adiyabo, on the northeast by the Mareb River which separates it from Eritrea, on the east by the Central Zone, and on the southeast by Medebay Zana. The administrative center of this woreda is Addi Daero; other towns in La'ilay Adiyabo include Addi Nebreid.

Two battles of the Ethiopian Civil War were fought in or near Addi Nebreid by rival groups rebelling against the Derg regime. In July 1976, 500 soldiers of the Ethiopian Democratic Union were surrounded and defeated near Addi Nebreid by an armed group of the Tigray People's Liberation Front (TPLF) under Mehari Tekle ("Mussie"). The TPLF captured 125 of their opponent's men, killing or wounding the rest, and capturing a large number of badly needed semi-automatic rifles. The two groups clashed again at Addi Nebreid on 12 March 1977, with the EDU advancing on seven entrenched companies of the TPLF. The fighting raged for two days until the TPLF units, by that point out of ammunition, retreated in good order having inflicted substantial losses on their rivals. "From then on," writes Aregawi Berhe, one of the TPLF commanders in the battle, "the EDU could not proceed through TPLF-held territory without paying a heavy cost to mobilize the feudal and shifta elements in the central region and beyond."

== Demographics ==
Based on the 2007 Census conducted by the Central Statistical Agency of Ethiopia (CSA), this woreda has a total population of 113,836, an increase of 79,832 over the 1994 national census, of whom 56,685 are men and 57,151 women; 8,033 or 7.06% are urban inhabitants. With an area of 2,809.29 square kilometers, La'ilay Adiyabo has a population density of 40.52, which is greater than the Zone average of 40.21 persons per square kilometer. A total of 25,414 households were counted in this woreda, resulting in an average of 4.48 persons to a household, and 24,407 housing units. The majority of the inhabitants said they practiced Ethiopian Orthodox Christianity, with 97.85% reporting that as their religion, while 2.1% of the population were Muslim.

The 1994 national census reported a total population for this woreda of 79,832, of whom 40,547 were men and 39,285 were women; 5,929 or 7.43% of its population were urban dwellers. The three largest ethnic groups reported in La'ilay Adiyabo were the Tigrayan (96.76%), foreigners from Eritrea (2.42%), and the Saho (0.76%); all other ethnic groups made up 0.06% of the population. Tigrinya was spoken as a first language by 98.9%, and 1.07% spoke Saho; the remaining 0.03% spoke all other primary languages reported. The majority of the inhabitants practiced Ethiopian Orthodox Christianity, with 96.5% reporting that as their religion, while 3.45% were Muslim. Concerning education, 6.18% of the population were considered literate, which is less than the Zone average of 9.01%; 6.89% of the children aged 7–12 were in primary school, which is less than the Zone average of 11.34%; a negligible number of the children aged 13–14 were in junior secondary school, which is also less than the Zone average of 0.65%; and a negligible number of children aged 15–18 were in senior secondary school, which is less than the Zone average of 0.51%. Concerning sanitary conditions, about 28% of the urban houses and 8% of all houses had access to safe drinking water at the time of the census; about 15% of the urban and 3% of all houses had toilet facilities.

== Agriculture ==
A sample enumeration performed by the CSA in 2001 interviewed 24,664 farmers in this woreda, who held an average of 1.16 hectares of land. Of the 24,023 hectares of private land surveyed, 89.39% was under cultivation, 1.28% pasture, 7.49% fallow, 5 hectares in woodland, and 1.82% was devoted to other uses. For the land under cultivation in this woreda, 85.23% was planted in cereals, 1.89% in pulses, 1.74% in oilseeds, and 0.41% in vegetables. The total area planted in fruit trees was 6 hectares, while 17 were planted in gesho. 78.63% of the farmers both raised crops and livestock, while 19.69% only grew crops and 1.69% only raised livestock. Land tenure in this woreda is distributed amongst 82% owning their land, 17% renting, and 1.54% holding their land under other forms of tenure.

== 2020 woreda reorganisation ==
In 2020 woreda La'ilay Adiyabo became inoperative and its territory belongs to the following new woredas:

- La'ilay Adiyabo(new, smaller, woreda)
- Seyemti Adiyabo woreda
- Addi Da'iro woreda
