= Tselemti =

District in Tigray Region, Ethiopia

Coordinates: 13°40′N 38°10′E

Tselemti ጸለምቲ (Tigrinya)
- Woreda
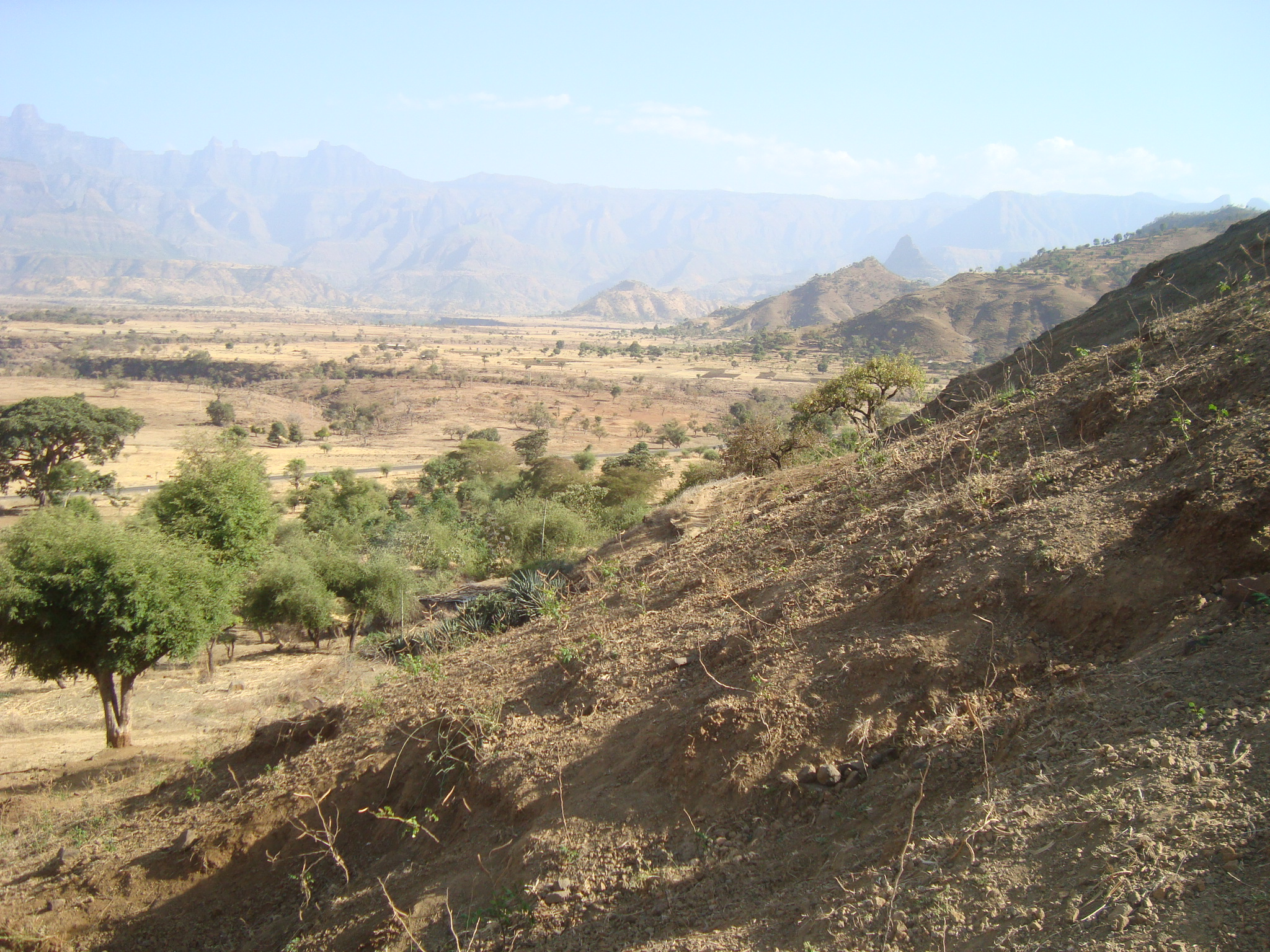

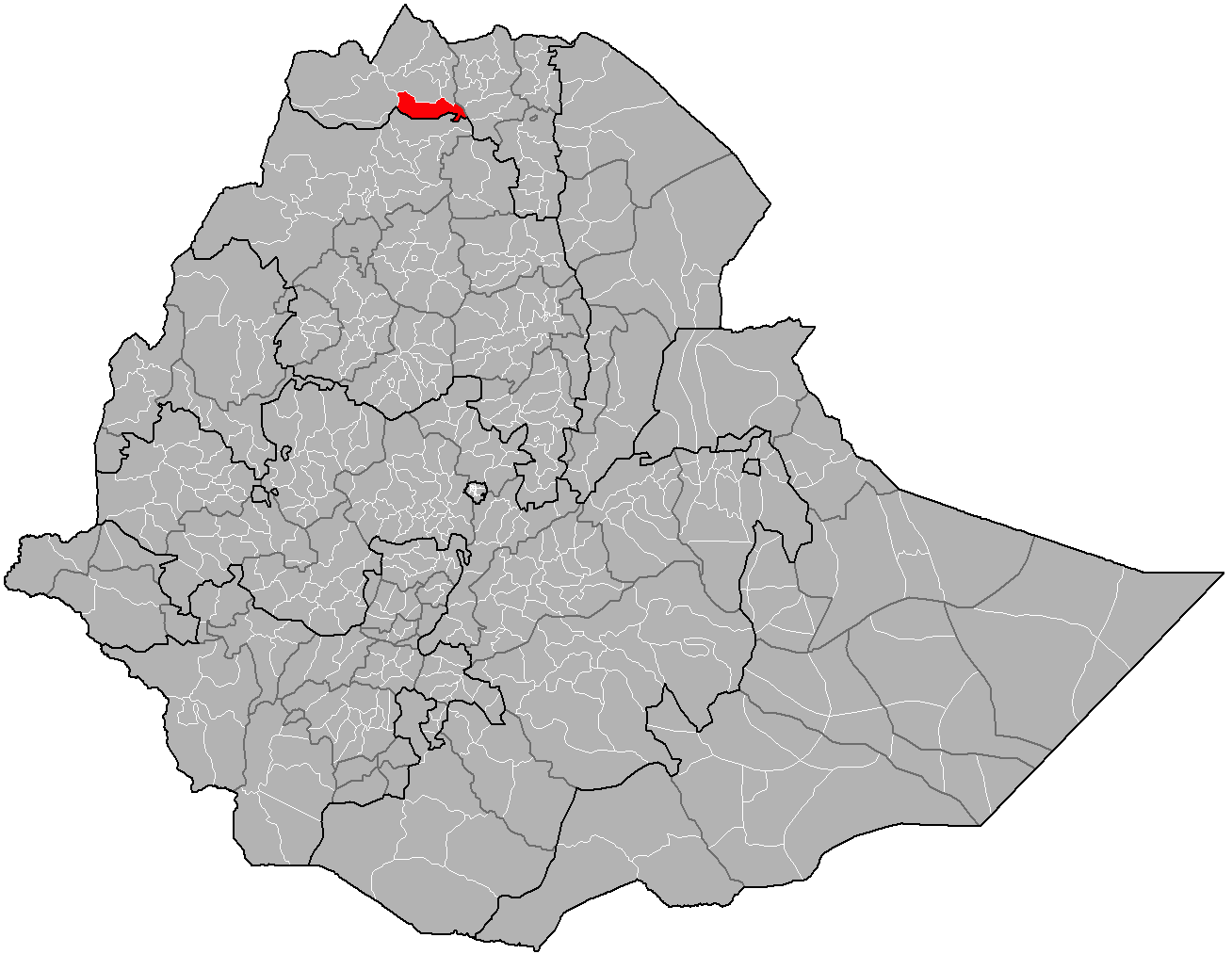
- Country: Ethiopia
- Region: Tigray
- Zone: Semien Mi'irabawi (North Western)
- Administrative center: Mai Tsebri

Area
  - Total: 3,858.66 km^{2} (1,489.84 sq mi)

Population (2017)
  - Total: 158,000

Tselemti (Tigrinya: ጸለምቲ, lit. 'blackish') is an Ethiopian District, or woreda, in the Tigray Region of Ethiopia. Part of the Semien Mi'irabawi (North Western) Zone, Tselemti is bordered on the south by the Amhara Region, on the west by the Mi'irabawi Zone, on the north by Asigede Tsimbela, on the northeast by Medebay Zana, and on the east by the Maekelay (Central Area) Zone. The Tekezé defines the boundary between Tselemti and both the last two woredas and the Zone; other rivers in this woreda include the Abata, a tributary of the Tekezé. The administrative center of this woreda is Mai Tsebri; other towns in Tselemti include Dima.

== History ==
Tselemti, a Tigrinya speaking district, just as originally the adjacent Tellemt, was part of Gondar Teklay Gizat in the mid 20th C. (and before that, it was part of the Kingdom of Axum where its capital city was Axum). Since the beginning of the Zagwe dynasty c.900 AD. until the 1995 constitution ratification, Tselemti was part of Begemder province. Tselemti was then split into two parts once ethnic federalism was established in Ethiopia (in 1995). One of the two parts which had turned up to have a majority Agaw and Amhara ethnic group living in it, was given to the new Amhara Region (this province is called Addi Arkay woreda, which is a Tigrinya name). The other, still had a majority of Tigrayan ethnic people (over 90%) so it was returned to the Tigray Region, as it had been for most of the 3000 years history of Ethiopia, before Haile Selassie changed it in 1941/1943.

The decline of the Tigrayan population in Ethiopia during Haile Selassie's reign – in particular in districts of the former Tigray province, which are given to the present-day Amhara Region, like Addi Arkay, Kobo and Sanja – is likely to have been as a result of Haile Selassie's suppression and systematic persecution against non-Amhara ethnic peoples of Ethiopia (in particular, his immense systematic persecution of Tigrayans). For example, on the 1958 famine of Tigray, Haile Selassie refused to send any significant basic emergency food aid to Tigray province despite having the resources to; as a consequence, over 100,000 people died of the famine (in Tigray province).

=== 2020 woreda reorganisation ===
In 2020 woreda Tselemti became inoperative and its territory belongs to the following new woredas:

- Tselemti(new, smaller, woreda)
- Dima woreda
- May Tsebri town

== Demographics ==
Based on the 2007 national census conducted by the Central Statistical Agency of Ethiopia (CSA), this woreda has a total population of 138,858, an increase of 97,630 over the 1994 census, of whom 70,108 are men and 68,750 women; 8,623 or 6.21% are urban inhabitants. With an area of 3,858.66 square kilometers, Tselemti has a population density of 35.99 people per square kilometer, which is less than the Zone average of 40.21. A total of 30,485 households were counted in this woreda, resulting in an average of 4.55 persons to a household, and 29,805 housing units. The majority of the inhabitants said they practiced Ethiopian Orthodox Christianity, with 98.47% reporting that as their religion, while 1.51% of the population were Muslim.

The 1994 national census reported a total population for this woreda of 97,630, of whom 49,893 were men and 47,737 were women; 5,301 or 5.43% of its population were urban dwellers. The two largest ethnic groups reported in Tselemti were the Tigrayan (89.12%), and the Amhara (10.63%); all other ethnic groups made up 0.25% of the population. Tigrinya is spoken as a first language by 57.18%, and 42.73% speak Amharic; the remaining 0.09% spoke all other primary languages reported in urban areas.Religion; 97.98% of the population said they were Ethiopian Orthodox Christianity, and 1.77% were Muslim. Concerning education, 5.13% of the population were considered literate, which is less than the Zone average of 9.01%; 5.91% of children aged 7–12 were in primary school, which is less than the Zone average of 11.34%; 0.34% of the children aged 13–14 were in junior secondary school, which is also less than the Zone average of 0.65%; and 0.06% of children aged 15–18 were in senior secondary school, which is less than the Zone average of 0.51%. Concerning sanitary conditions, 0.77% of the urban houses and about 5% of all houses had access to safe drinking water at the time of the census; 9.07% of the urban and about 2% of all houses had toilet facilities.

== Agriculture ==
A sample enumeration performed by the CSA in 2001 interviewed 28,435 farmers in this woreda, who held an average of 1.31 hectares of land. Of the 37,127 hectares of private land surveyed, over 85.59% was in cultivation, 3.03% pasture, 3.86% fallow, 0.18% in woodland, and 7.3% was devoted to other uses. For the land under cultivation in this woreda, 79.16% was planted in cereals, 1.82% in pulses, and 4.24% in oilseeds; the area in vegetables is missing. The area planted in fruit trees and gesho is missing. 88.76% of the farmers both raised crops and livestock, while 7.45% only grew crops and 3.8% only raised livestock. Land tenure in this woreda is distributed amongst 88.49% owning their land, and 11.49% renting; none were reported as holding their land under other forms of tenure.
