= Inda Aba Guna =

Inda Aba Guna እንዳባጉና
- Town
- Location within Ethiopia
- Coordinates: 13.94927574434289°N 38.18217056443678°E
- Country: Ethiopia
- Region: Tigray
- Zone: Northwestern Zone
- Woreda: Inda Aba Guna town
- Elevation: 1,766.316 m (5,795.00 ft)

Population (2020)
  - Total: 21,943
- Time zone: UTC+3 (EAT)

Inda Aba Guna (Ge'ez: እንዳባጉና), is a town in the Tigray Region of Ethiopia located at 925 km north of Addis Ababa and 270 km north of Mekelle along the highway which runs from Shire to Gondar. The town is also the administrative center of the Tsimbla woreda (district).

== Economy ==
The town's economy is agriculturally focused.
