= Sheraro =

Town in Tigray Region, Ethiopia

Sheraro ሸራሮ
- Town
- Location within Ethiopia
- Coordinates: 14°23′45″N 37°46′23″E
- Country: Ethiopia
- Region: Tigray
- Zone: North Western
- Elevation: 1,246 m (4,088 ft)

Population (2007)
  - Total: 17,045
- Time zone: UTC+3 (EAT)

Sheraro (Tigrinya: ሸራሮ) is a town and separate woreda in Tigray, Ethiopia. It is located in the North Western Zone of the Tigray Region, at an elevation of 1246 meters above sea level. It is the administrative center of Tahtay Adiyabo. It is near the border with Eritrea.

Between January 1995 and June 1998, SUR Construction built two road segments connecting Sheraro with Shire to the east and Humera to the west, totalling in length 139.5 kilometers.

== History ==
Along with Zana, Sheraro was an early hotbed of Tigrayan People's Liberation Front (TPLF) support. According to Gebru Tareke, the TPLF made Sheraro its base between 1979 and 1980, not only creating a support infrastructure there but also cultivating the land to grow cereals such as corn and sorghum, and cash crops like sesame. Eventually, the Derg, the ruling military junta of Ethiopia, directed a military campaign to crush the TPLF at its base. On 12 February 1980, they launched Operation Sheraro, in which four brigades of 4,000 men under the command of Colonel Tariku Ayne advanced first to the TPLF base on the Sur River, which they destroyed then on 25 February departed for Shiraro, which they found deserted and the TPLF positioned on the heights. On the next day, although without intelligence about their opponents, the Derg soldiers advanced into an open field—where the TPLF ambushed them. After four hours of fierce fighting, the four brigades of the defenders dissolved and the men retreated in disarray. Their casualties were 117 dead (including three battalion and three company commanders) and 292 wounded (including 11 officers).

When the Derg evacuated the town for the last time in 1985, allegedly the soldiers left land mines and hidden bombs which injured some people who had returned from hiding in the countryside. Shiraro was subjected to an aerial attack by Derg aircraft on 12 December 1988, which killed 8 people.

Sheraro experienced shelling on 21 October 1998, during the Eritrean-Ethiopian War. Its inhabitants and refugees from the surrounding area who had sought safety in the town fled to a camp near Zeban Gedena, about 15 kilometers to the southeast.

== Demographics ==
Based on the 2007 national census conducted by the Central Statistical Agency of Ethiopia (CSA), this town has a total population of 17,045, of whom 8,163 are men and 8,882 women. The majority of the inhabitants said they practiced Ethiopian Orthodox Christianity, with 93.2% reporting that as their religion, while 6.54% of the population were Muslim.

According to the 1994 national census, its total population was 8,415 of whom 3,881 were men and 4,534 were women. "

== Ethiopian Civil War ==
During the Ethiopian Civil War, on 12 December 1988, Sheraro was bombed from the air by the Ethiopian Air Force, and eight people were killed.

== Tigray War ==
During the Tigray War, the town was the site of a massacre where approximately 40 civilians, among them Eritrean refugees, were extrajudicially executed by the EDF.

After the massacre and amid renewed fighting in the region, the town was taken by Eritrean and Ethiopian forces on 13 September 2022.
