= Tahtay Adiyabo =

Coordinates: 14°20′N 37°50′E

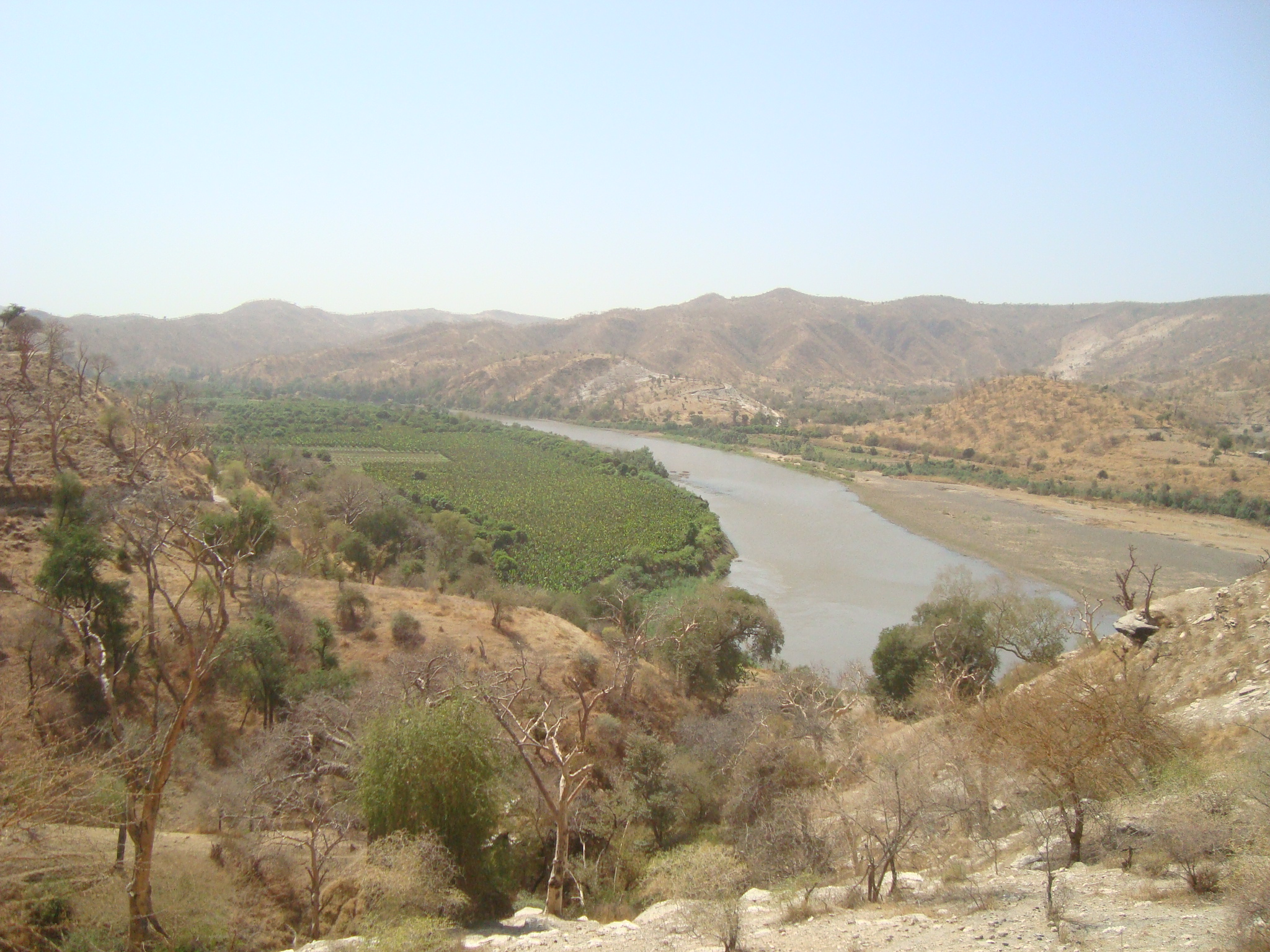
Tekeze River in Tahtay Adiyabo

Tahtay Adiyabo (Tigrinya: ታሕታይ ኣድያቦ, lit. 'Lower Adiyabo') is a woreda in the Tigray Region of Ethiopia. Part of the North Western Zone, Tahtay Adiyabo is bordered on the south by Asigede Tsimbela, on the southwest by the Tekezé River on the north by Eritrea, and on the east by La'ilay Adiyabo; part of the northern border with Eritrea is delineated by the Mareb River. The northernmost point of this woreda is the northernmost point of Ethiopia. Towns in this woreda include Addi Awuala and Addi Hageray. The town of Sheraro is surrounded by Tahtay Adiyabo.

== History ==
On 26 September 1976, on the eve of Meskel, the Tigray People's Liberation Front (TPLF) turned back an advance by an armed detachment of 250 Ethiopian Democratic Union fighters at Chiameskebet, a village near Shiraro, on 26 September 1976, forcing them to retreat across the Tekezé. Both sides suffered heavy casualties; amongst the TPLF wounded was their general, Mehari Tekle ("Mussie"), who was fatally wounded in the battle and died a few days later.

Flooding by the Tekezé in August 2006 damaged 68.5 hectares planted in fruits and vegetables and buried 21 water pumps. A violent storm in the second week of the same month also damaged 48.5 hectares of crops.

== Demographics ==
Based on the 2007 national census conducted by the Central Statistical Agency of Ethiopia (CSA), this woreda has a total population of 90,144, an increase of 80,934 over the 1994 census, of whom 45,834 are men and 44,310 women; 6,377 or 7.07% are urban inhabitants. With an area of 3,841.51 square kilometers, Tahtay Adiyabo has a population density of 23.47 people per square kilometer, which is less than the Zone average of 40.21. A total of 20,553 households were counted in this woreda, resulting in an average of 4.39 persons to a household, and 19,141 housing units. The majority of the inhabitants said they practiced Ethiopian Orthodox Christianity, with 95.59% reporting that as their religion, while 3.15% of the population were Muslim.

The 1994 national census reported a total population for this woreda of 80,934 of whom 41,136 were men and 39,798 were women; 12,761 or 15.77% of its population were urban dwellers. The three largest ethnic groups reported in Tahtay Adiyabo were the Tigrayan (71.36%), foreign residents from Eritrea (26.23%), and the Kunama (1.41%); all other ethnic groups made up 1% of the population. Tigrinya is spoken as a first language by 97.35%, and 1.39% speak Kunama; the remaining 1.26% spoke all other primary languages reported. 96.33% of the population said they were Ethiopian Orthodox Christianity, and 3.49% were Muslim. Concerning education, 9.58% of the population were considered literate, which is greater than the Zone average of 9.01%; 11.09% of children aged 7–12 were in primary school, which is less than the Zone average of 11.34%; 0.21% of the children aged 13–14 were in junior secondary school, which is less than the Zone average of 0.65%; none of the inhabitants aged 15–18 were in senior secondary school. Concerning sanitary conditions, about 90% of the urban houses and 34% of all houses had access to safe drinking water at the time of the census; about 12% of the urban and 6% of the total had toilet facilities.

== Agriculture ==
A sample enumeration performed by the CSA in 2001 interviewed 17,471 farmers in this woreda, who held an average of 1.23 hectares of land. Of the 21,514 hectares of private land surveyed in Tahtay Adiyabo, 85.25% was under cultivation, 1.66% pasture, 11.53% fallow, and 1.56% was devoted to other uses; the amount in woodland is missing. For the land under cultivation in this woreda, 76.82% is planted in cereals, 2.42% in pulses, 5.57% in oilseeds, and 0.4% in vegetables. The number of hectares planted in fruit trees is missing. 80.88% of the farmers both raise crops and livestock, while 16.72% only grow crops and 2.39% only raise livestock. Land tenure in this woreda is distributed amongst 70.22% owning their land, 27.22% renting, and those holding their land under other forms of tenure 2.58%.

== 2020 woreda reorganisation ==
In 2020 woreda Tahtay Adiyabo became inoperative and its territory belongs to the following new woredas:

- Tahtay Adiyabo(new, smaller, woreda)
- Addi Hageray woreda
- Sheraro town
