= Tahtay Koraro =

District in Tigray Region, Ethiopia

Coordinates: 14°10′N 38°15′E

Tahtay Koraro ታሕታይ ቆራሮ
- Woreda
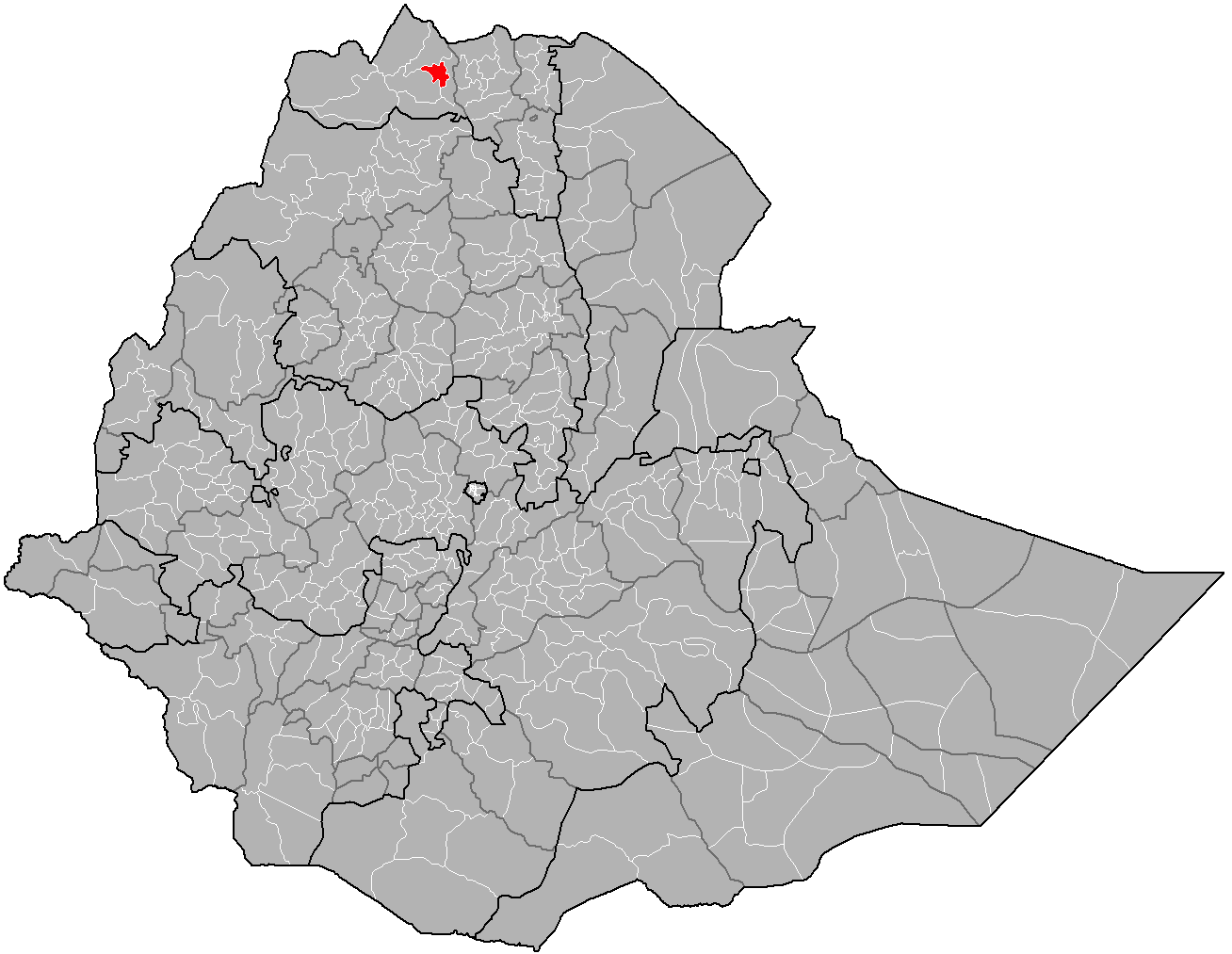
- Country: Ethiopia
- Region: Tigray
- Zone: Semien Mi'irabawi Zone

Area
  - Total: 1,940.38 km^{2} (749.18 sq mi)

Population (2007)
  - Total: 68,989

Tahtai Koraro (Tigrinya: ታሕታይ ቆራሮ, "Lower Koraro") is a woreda in Tigray Region, Ethiopia. Part of the Semien Mi'irabawi Zone, Tahtai Koraro is bordered on the southwest by Asigede Tsimbela, on the north by La'ilai Adyabo, and on the southeast by Medebai Zana. The town of Inda Selassie is surrounded by Tahtai Koraro.

Local landmarks in this woreda includes Mai Adrasha, an archeological site showing an uninterrupted chronological range from the Pre-Axumite through the Late Axumite periods (c. 800 BC - AD 700) - an indication of the site's importance both as a long-lived habitation in the area, and as the westernmost known example of this chronological range.

== Demographics ==
Based on the 2007 national census conducted by the Central Statistical Agency of Ethiopia (CSA), this woreda has a total population of 68,989, an increase of 83,492 over the 1994 census, of whom 34,477 are men and 34,512 women are urban inhabitants. With an area of 1,940.38 square kilometers, Tahtai Koraro has a population density of 35.55, which is less than the Zone average of 40.21. A total of 14,273 households were counted in this woreda, resulting in an average of 4.83 persons to a household, and 13,842 housing units. The majority of the inhabitants practice Ethiopian Orthodox Christianity, with 97.72% reporting that as their religion, while 2.18% of the population follow Muslim.

The 1994 national census reported a total population for this woreda of 83,492, of whom 40,933 were men and 42,559 were women; 25,991 or 31.13% of its population were urban dwellers. The largest ethnic group reported in Tahtai Koraro was the Tigrayan (98.98%), and Tigrinya was spoken as a first language by 98.97%. The majority of the inhabitants practice Ethiopian Orthodox Christianity, with 92.27% reporting that as their religion, while 7.67% follow Muslim. Concerning education, 20.8% of the population were considered literate, which is greater than the Zone average of 9.01%; 33.01% of the children aged 7–12 were in primary school, which is greater than the Zone average of 11.34%; 3.38% of the children aged 13–14 were in junior secondary school, which is also greater than the Zone average of 0.65%; and 4.11% of the children aged 15–18 were in senior secondary school, which is greater than the Zone average of 0.51%. Concerning sanitary conditions, about 80% of the urban houses and 35% of all houses had access to safe drinking water at the time of the census; about 32% of the urban and 12% of all houses had toilet facilities.

== Agriculture ==
A sample enumeration performed by the CSA in 2001 interviewed 13,859 farmers in this woreda, who held an average of 0.85 hectares of land. Of the 11,765 hectares of private land surveyed in Tahtai Koraro, 91.76% was under cultivation, 0.68% pasture, 5.3% fallow, 0.01% woodland, and 2.25% was devoted to other uses. For the land under cultivation in this woreda, 82.94% is planted in cereals, 7.01% in pulses, 0.97% in oilseeds, and 0.42% in vegetables. Eight hectares were planted in fruit trees. 80.27% of the farmers both raise crops and livestock, while 17.99% only grow crops and 1.74% only raise livestock. Land tenure in this woreda is distributed amongst 79.65% owning their land, 18.84% renting, and those holding their land under other forms of tenure 1.5%.

== 2020 woreda reorganisation ==
In 2020 woreda Tahtay Koraro was split up between:

- woreda Tahtay Koraro
- Shire Inda Sillasie town
