= North Western Zone, Tigray =

Zone in Tigray Region of Ethiopia

Coordinates: 14°01′13″N 38°09′50″E

North Western Zone ዞባ ሰሜን ምዕራብ
- Zone
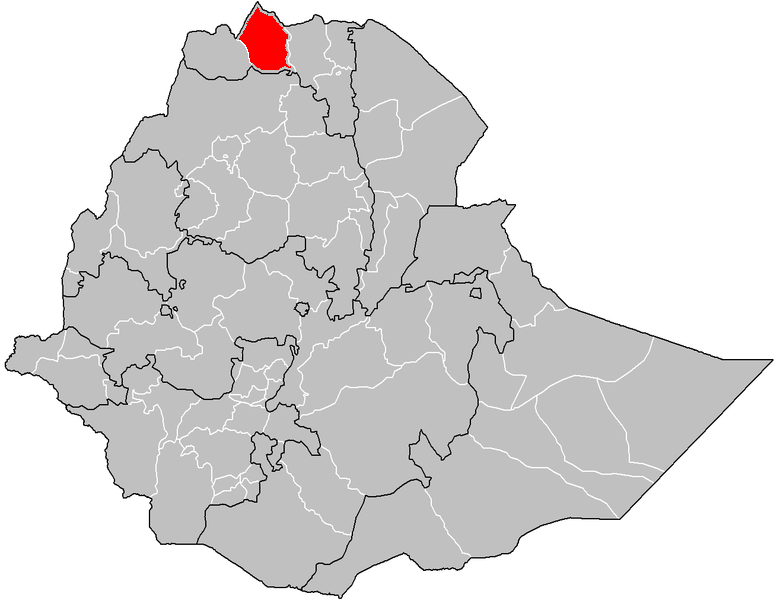
- North Western Zone location in Ethiopia
- Country: Ethiopia
- Region: Tigray
- Largest city: Shire

Area
  - Total: 10,325.11 km^{2} (3,986.55 sq mi)

Population (2012 est.)
  - Total: 835,853
  - Density: 80.9534/km^{2} (209.668/sq mi)

The North Western Zone (Tigrinya: ዞባ ሰሜን ምዕራብ) is a zone in Tigray Region of Ethiopia. It is bordered on the east by the Central Zone, the south by the Amhara Region, the west by the Western Zone and on the north by Eritrea. The Zone is subdivided into the six woredas (districts), which are Asgede, Tsimbla, La'ilay Adiyabo, Medebay Zana, Tahtay Adiyabo, Tahtay Koraro and Tselemti. Major towns and cities in the zone include Shire, Sheraro, Inda Aba Guna, Selekleka, Adi Daero, May Tsebri. The North Western Zone was split off from Western Zone in 2005.

== Demographics ==
Based on the 2007 Census conducted by the Central Statistical Agency of Ethiopia (CSA), this Zone has a total population of 736,805, of whom 368,254 are men and 368,551 women; 107,999 or 14.66% are urban inhabitants. Two largest ethnic groups reported in Semien Mi'irabawi were the Tigray (96.81%), and Amhara (1.58%); all other ethnic groups made up 1.61% of the population. Tigrinya is spoken as a first language by 95.6, and Amharic by 2.8%; the remaining 1.6% spoke all other primary languages reported. 96.76% of the population said they were Orthodox Christians, and 3.04% were Muslim.
