= Shire, Ethiopia =

City in Tigray Region, Ethiopia

Shire ሽረ Inda Selassie (እንዳ ሥላሴ)
- City and woreda
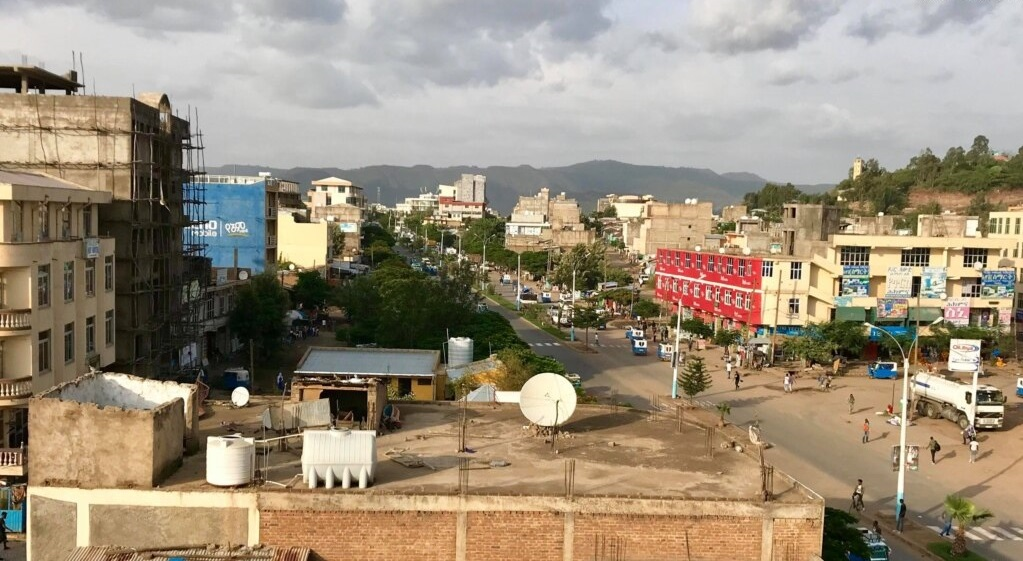
- Overhead view of Shire

- Location within Ethiopia Location within the Horn of Africa Location within Africa
- Coordinates: 14°6′N 38°17′E
- Country: Ethiopia
- Region: Tigray
- Zone: Semien Mi'irabawi

Government
- Elevation: 1,953 m (6,407 ft)

Population (2021)
  - Total: 95,491
- Time zone: UTC+3 (EAT)
- Website: www.shiremunicipal.gov.et

Shire (Tigrinya: ሽረ, Shuh-ruh; Amharic: ሽሬ, Shuh-ré), also known as Shire Inda Selassie (Tigrinya: ሽረ እንዳ ሥላሴ, meaning "House of the Trinity"), is a city and separate woreda in the Tigray Region of Ethiopia. The city is the administrative center of the Shire Awraja, Mi erabawi Zoba and later Semien Mi'irabawi Zone. It was part of Tahtay Koraro district.

== History ==
=== Origin ===
An early mention of Shire is in one of the three surviving charters of Emperor Dawit I (r. 1382–1412).

=== 16th century ===
The metropolis was a tributary state of Adal and governed by the Christian, Diganah.

=== 20th century ===
As part of the Second Italo-Ethiopian War, Italian units under General Pietro Badoglio advanced out of Axum on 29 February 1936 to attack the Ethiopian army under Ras Imru Haile Selassie deployed around Shire in an action known as the Battle of Shire. Despite determined Ethiopian resistance, by 3 March the Italians had resumed their advance and shortly afterwards crossed the Tekezé River.

After the restoration of the monarchy in 1941, Shire served as the capital of the Shire sub-region until the administrative reorganization of the nation following the adoption of the 1995 Ethiopian Constitution.

Shire once again became a battlefield during the Ethiopian Civil War. The first clash of the Tigrayan People's Liberation Front (TPLF) with government forces occurred on 5 August 1975, after Mehari Tekle ("Mussie"), a member of the TPLF leadership, was arrested in Addi Daero by government militiamen and taken to prison in Shire. Before he could be transported to a more secure facility in Mek'ele or Addis Ababa, a squad of eleven men burst into the prison, wounding one policeman and scattering the rest, freeing their comrade and 60 other prisoners, and spiriting him away to safety.

During the latter part of the war, following the massive Ethiopian army defeat at the Battle of Afabet in March 1988, the TPLF launched a series of offensives, in which they destroyed government forces stationed at Rama, Adwa, Seleh Leha, and Shire. Only about 200 soldiers of the 17th Army Division were able to evacuate Shire and fall back to Gondar. This led to the raising of the Third Revolutionary Army, composed of the 603rd, 604th and 605th core armies. Between 19 June and 3 July 1988 the 604th was able to regain control over 12 districts, and entered Shire with no significant resistance from TPLF forces. However, due to unrest amongst the government soldiers at Addi Hageray, which permitted the TPLF to attack and occupy that town, the 604th was unable to advance again until 28 December. This led to the Second Battle of Shire, which ended on 19 February 1989 as a victory for the TPLF. Although Shire had been the headquarters of the Third Revolutionary Army at the beginning of the battle, at the end the remaining units were retreating towards Enda Aba Guna. On 21 March 1989, Shire was bombed from the air by the Ethiopian Air Force: one person was killed. The third edition of Lonely Planet guide to Ethiopia notes that "war relics" could still be seen near Shire.

=== 21st century ===
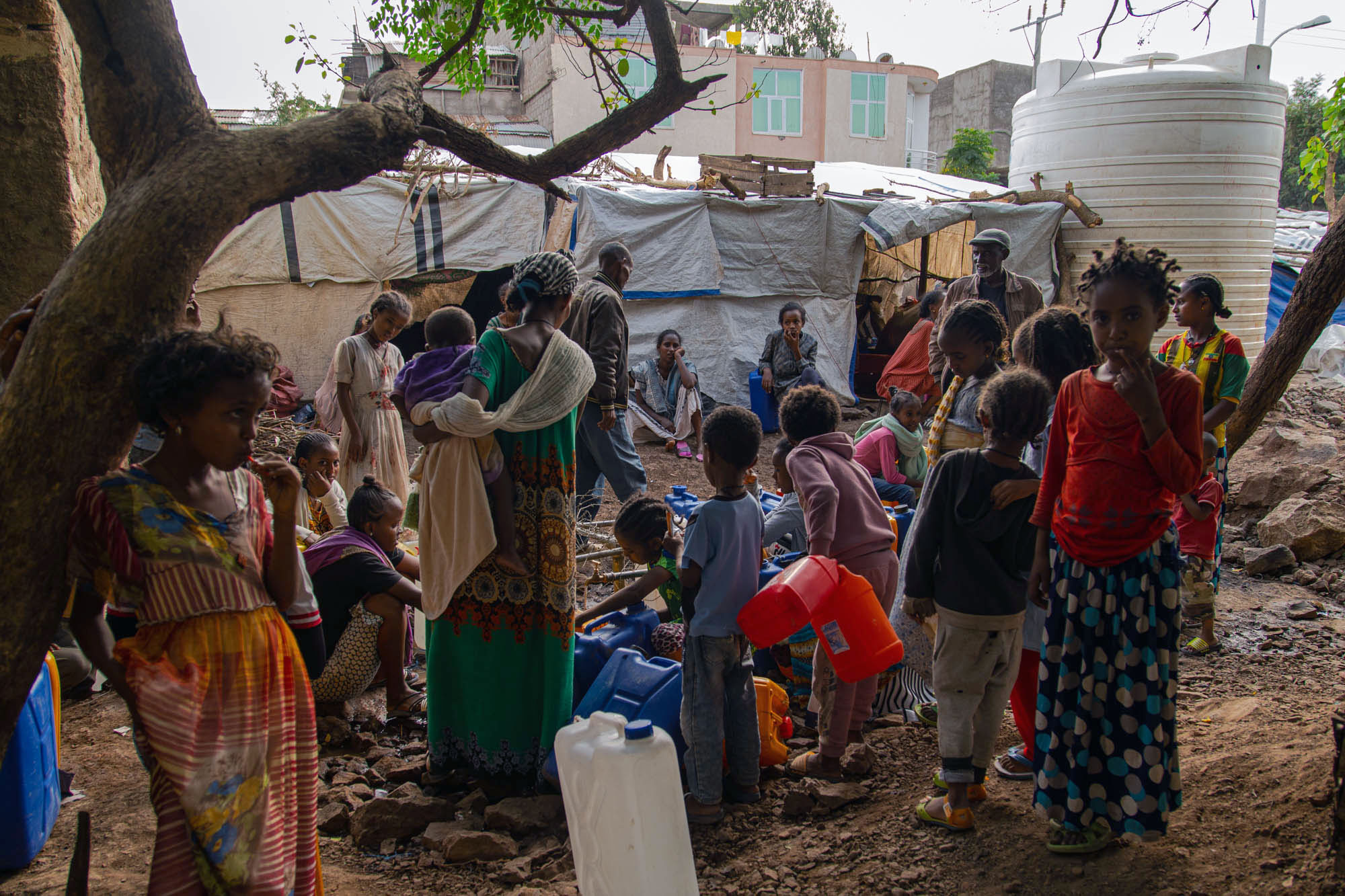
People collect drinking water in one of the many displaced persons camps in Shire, June 11, 2021

Since late 2019 swarms of desert locust have damaged crops in the horn of Africa leaving up to one million people in Ethiopia in need of food aid according to the UN.

The Tigray War that began in November 2020 and the COVID-19 pandemic in Ethiopia aggravated the food situation in Tigray Region. The situation was particularly bad in Shire, with 100,000 internally displaced people. About ten percent of the children were diagnosed (by arm measurements) as having severe acute malnutrition. The DX Open Network, based in the UK and analysing satellite images, found that two warehouse-style structures in the UN World Food Programme compound at Hitsats refugee camp had been "very specifically destroyed." Doctors Without Borders found that in the parts of Adigrat, Adwa and Axum that they had access to, in other parts of Tigray Region, the civilian casualties were "extremely high".

== Climate ==
Shire has a tropical savanna climate (Köppen climate classification Aw) with average rainfall reaching 905 mm.

Climate data for Shire
Month	Jan	Feb	Mar	Apr	May	Jun	Jul	Aug	Sep	Oct	Nov	Dec	Year
Mean daily maximum °C (°F)	28.0 (82.4)	29.8 (85.6)	30.3 (86.5)	31.8 (89.2)	31.1 (88.0)	29.5 (85.1)	23.6 (74.5)	23.4 (74.1)	26.7 (80.1)	28.3 (82.9)	28.7 (83.7)	27.5 (81.5)	28.2 (82.8)
Daily mean °C (°F)	19.2 (66.6)	20.7 (69.3)	21.5 (70.7)	23.3 (73.9)	23.1 (73.6)	21.9 (71.4)	18.1 (64.6)	18.2 (64.8)	19.7 (67.5)	20.1 (68.2)	19.4 (66.9)	18.6 (65.5)	20.3 (68.6)
Mean daily minimum °C (°F)	10.5 (50.9)	11.6 (52.9)	12.7 (54.9)	14.9 (58.8)	15.1 (59.2)	14.4 (57.9)	12.7 (54.9)	13.0 (55.4)	12.8 (55.0)	11.9 (53.4)	10.2 (50.4)	9.7 (49.5)	12.5 (54.4)
Average precipitation mm (inches)	2 (0.1)	1 (0.0)	3 (0.1)	22 (0.9)	48 (1.9)	119 (4.7)	297 (11.7)	274 (10.8)	110 (4.3)	15 (0.6)	14 (0.6)	0 (0)	905 (35.7)
Source: Climate-data.org

== Demographics ==
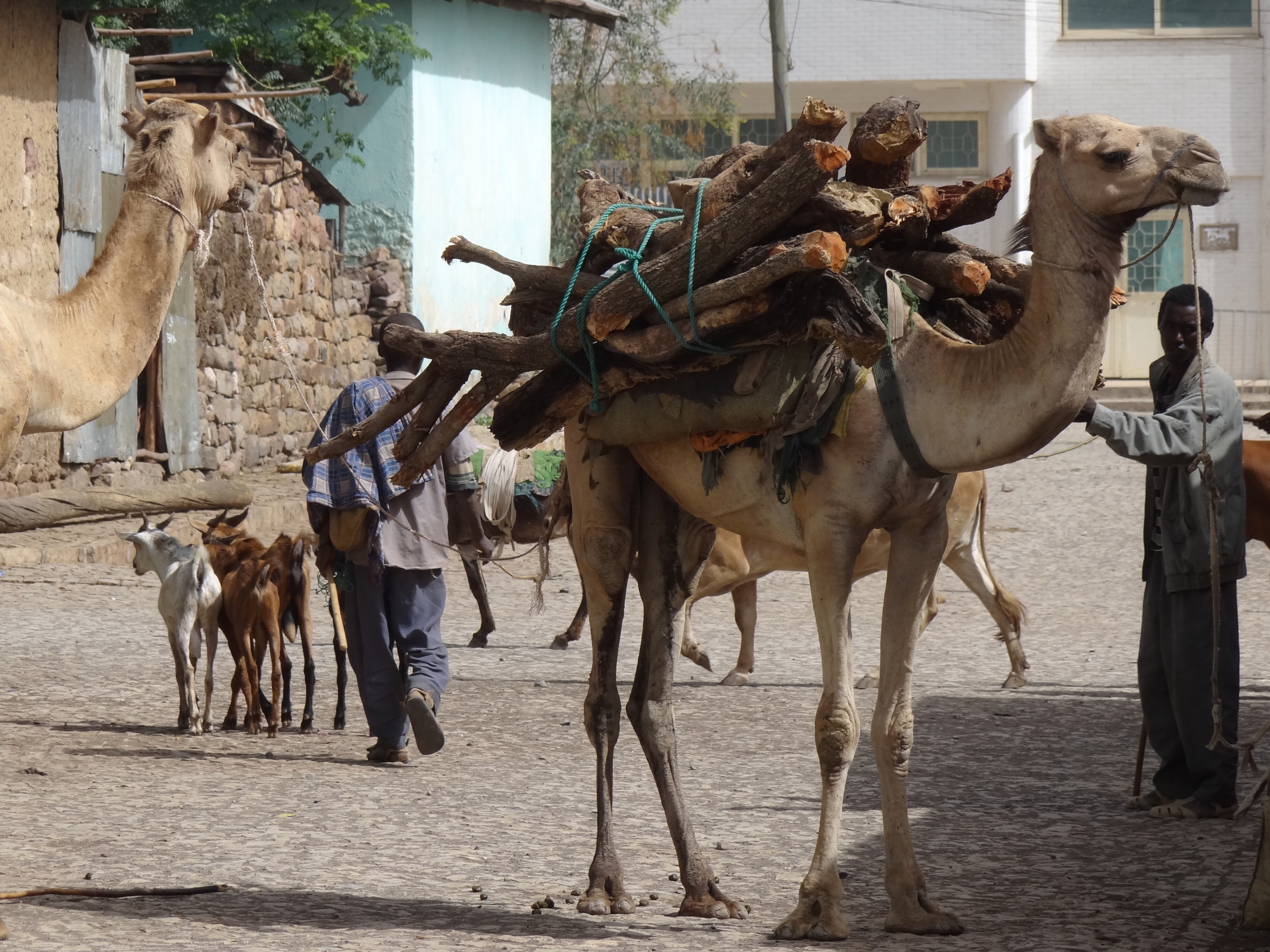
Street in Shire, seen with people, camels and goats.

Based on the July 2021 national census conducted by the Central Statistical Agency of Ethiopia (CSA), this city has a total population of 95,491.

Based on the 2007 national census conducted by the Central Statistical Agency of Ethiopia (CSA), this town has a total population of 47,284, of whom 21,867 are men and 25,417 women. The majority of the inhabitants said they practiced Ethiopian Orthodox Christianity, with 85.11% reporting that as their religion, while 14.67% of the population were Muslim.

According to the 1994 national census the town had a population of 25,269 of whom 11,360 were men and 13,909 women. In the mid-1980s, the population of the town was below 15, 000.

== Transportation ==
The Ethiopian Roads Authority had two roads built to connect Shire to neighboring towns. In June 2009, the authority released a report on their status. The road connecting Shire with Addi Goshu, 156 kilometers in length, was 52% complete, and would be completed by November 2010. The road that would connect to Addi Abun, 92 kilometers in length, would be completed in two years. As of May 2010 construction was underway on a road segment 71 kilometers long connecting Shire west to Dedebit, and which will continue on to Adi Remets then terminate at Dejena Densha. The town hosts an airport, Shire Airport (IATA code SHC).
