= Soil in Atsbi Wenberta =

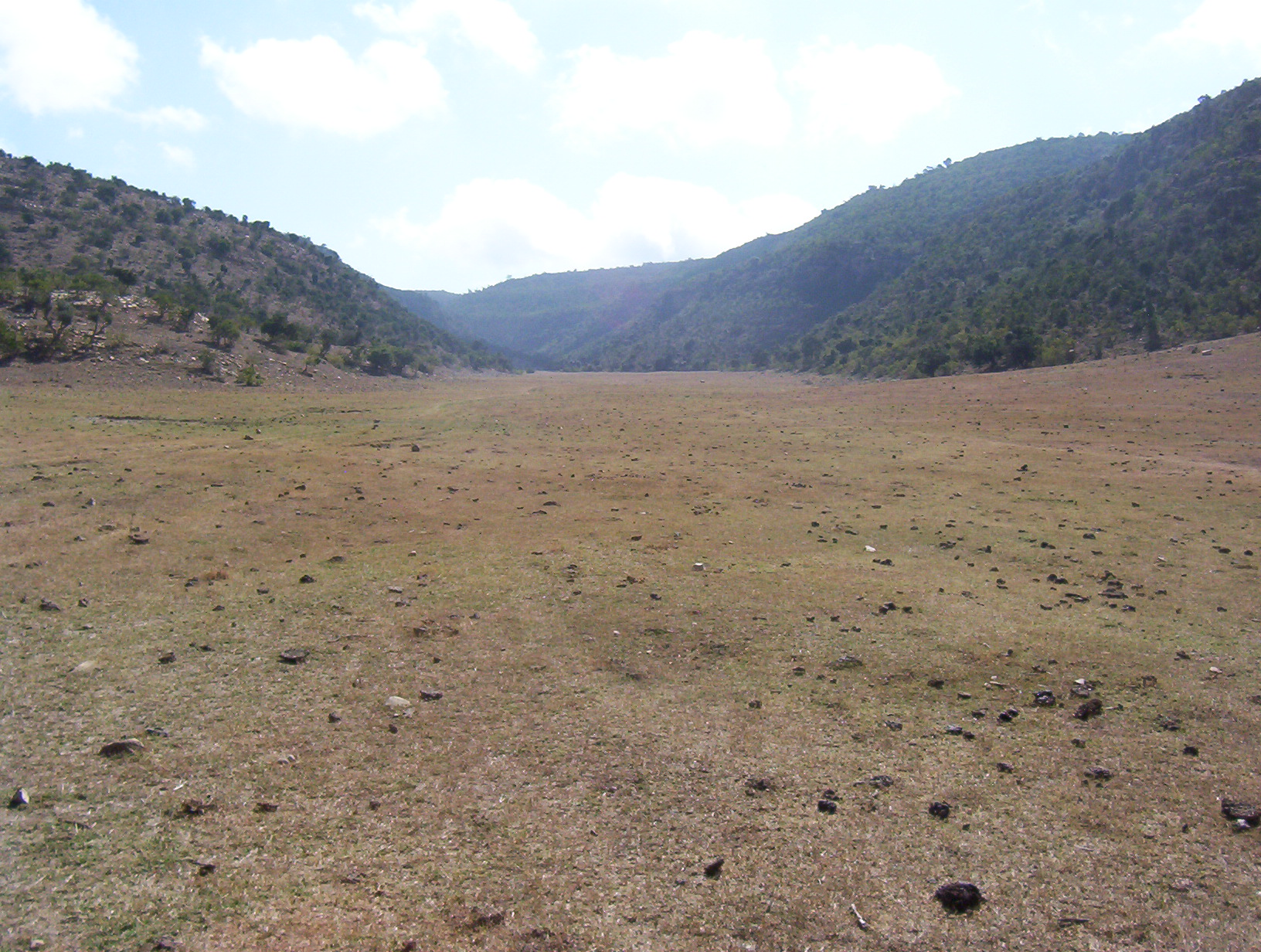
Dambo in Era at the fringe of Des'a forest

The soils of the Atsbi Wenberta woreda (district) in Tigray (Ethiopia) reflect its longstanding agricultural history, highly seasonal rainfall regime and relatively low temperatures. The northern part of the district is on the high uplifted Atsbi Horst (with metamorphic rock and consolidated Palaeozoic fluvio-glacial deposits), whereas the southern part is dominated by the Des'a forest on Antalo Limestone. In between there is the fluvial landscape of Hayqi Meshal. Particularities in the southern part of the district are soil catenas on intervening plains behind tufa dams and in a polje.

== Factors contributing to soil diversity ==
=== Climate ===
Annual rainfall depth is very variable with an average of around 800 mm. Most rains fall during the main rainy season, which typically extends from June to September. Mean temperature in woreda town Atsbi is 17 °C, oscillating between average daily minimum of 9.4 °C and maximum of 24.3 °C. The contrasts between day and night air temperatures are much larger than seasonal contrasts.

=== Geology ===
The following geological formations are present in the southern part:

- Agula Shale
- Antalo Limestone
- Quaternary alluvium and freshwater tufa

On the northern Atsbi Horst:

- Enticho Sandstone, forming mesas and table mountains
- Edaga Arbi Glacials, forming the somewhat lower, undulating plateau

=== Topography ===
As part of the Ethiopian Highlands the land has undergone a rapid tectonic uplift, leading the occurrence of plateaus, valleys and gorges.

=== Land use ===
Generally speaking the level lands and intermediate slopes are occupied by cropland, while there is rangeland and shrubs on the steeper slopes. Remnant forests occur around Orthodox Christian churches, in a few inaccessible places and especially in the Des'a forest. A recent trend is the widespread planting of eucalyptus trees.

=== Environmental changes ===
Soil degradation in this district became important when humans started deforestation almost 5000 years ago. Depending on land use history, locations have been exposed in varying degrees to such land degradation.

== Geomorphic regions and soil units ==
Given the complex geology and topography of the district, it has been organised into land systems - areas with specific and unique geomorphic and geological characteristics, characterised by a particular soil distribution along the soil catena. Soil types are classified in line with World Reference Base for Soil Resources and reference made to main characteristics that can be observed in the field.

=== Enticho Sandstone plateau ===
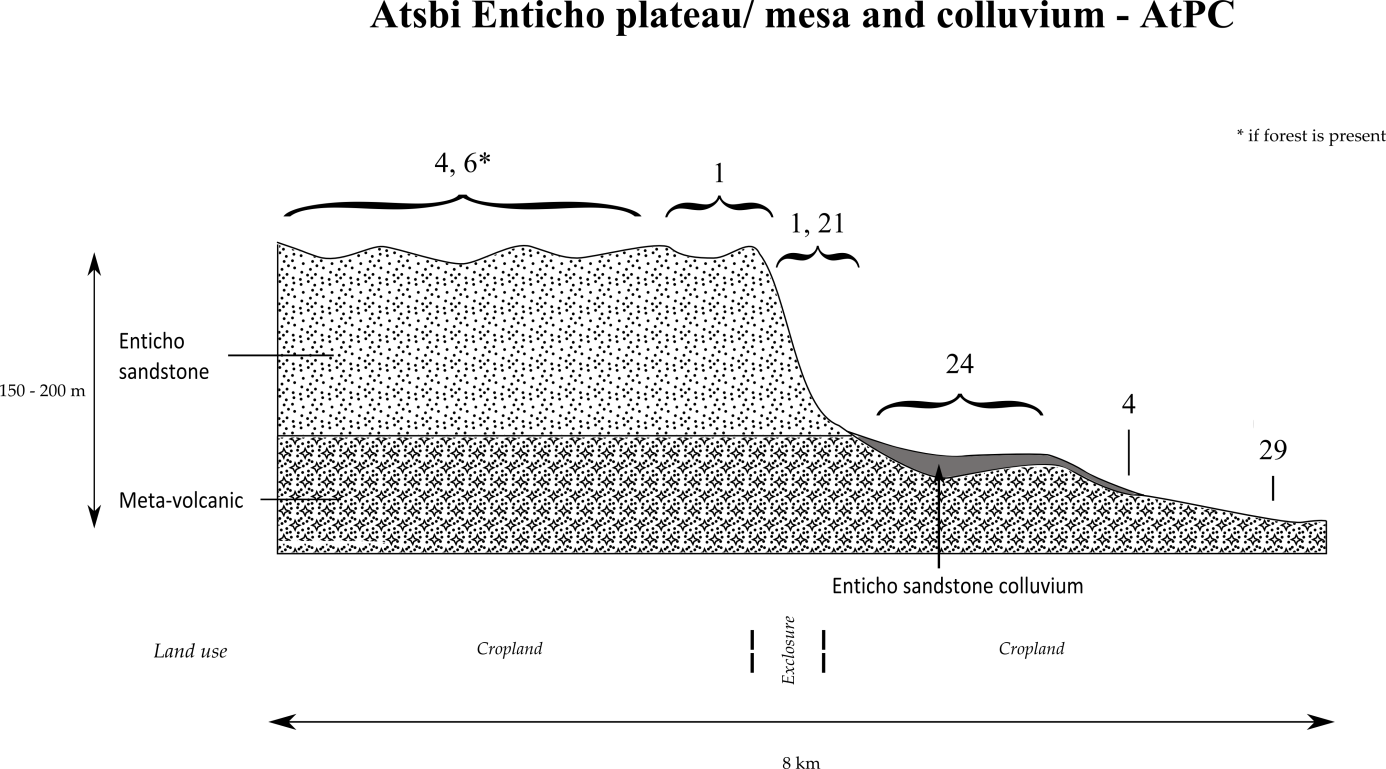
Typical catena on an Enticho Sandstone plateau, mesa and footslope (Atsbi Horst)

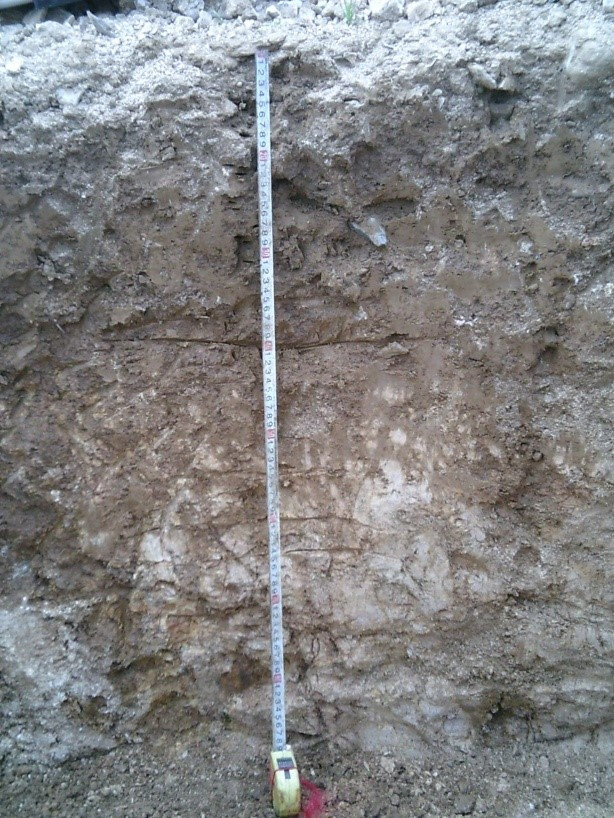
Leptic Cambisol profile

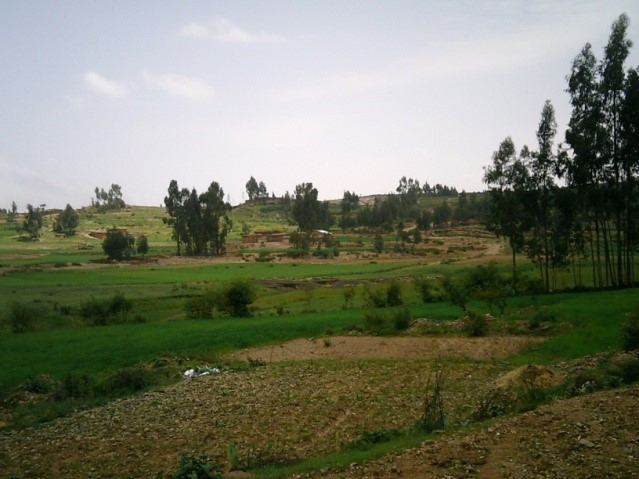
Leptic Cambisol

- Dominant soil type: shallow, very stony, silt loamy to loamy soils (Skeletic Cambisol, Leptic Cambisol, Skeletic Regosol) (4)
- Associated soil type: complex of rock outcrops, very stony and very shallow soils ((Lithic) Leptosol) (1)
- Inclusions
  - Shallow, dark loamy soils with a good natural fertility (Rendzic and Leptic Phaeozem (6)
  - shallow, stony loam soils (Eutric Regosol and Cambisol) (21)

=== Mesas in Enticho Sandstone ===
- Associated soil types
  - complex of rock outcrops, very stony and very shallow soils ((Lithic) Leptosol) (1)
  - shallow, very stony, silt loamy to loamy soils (Skeletic Cambisol, Leptic Cambisol, Skeletic Regosol) (4)
- Inclusions
  - Shallow, dark loamy soils with a good natural fertility (Rendzic and Leptic Phaeozem (6)
  - shallow, stony loam soils (Eutric Regosol and Cambisol) (21)

=== Colluvial slopes at the edge Enticho Sandstone plateaus ===
- Dominant soil type: sandy clay loams to sands developed on sandy colluvium (Eutric Arenosol, Regosol, Cambisol) (24)
- Associated soil type: shallow, very stony, silt loamy to loamy soils (Skeletic Cambisol, Leptic Cambisol, Skeletic Regosol) (4)
- Inclusion: brown, silty loams to loamy sands developed on alluvium, with good natural fertility (Mollic) Fluvisol, Fluvic Cambisol (29)

=== Undulating plain (Atsbi horst) ===
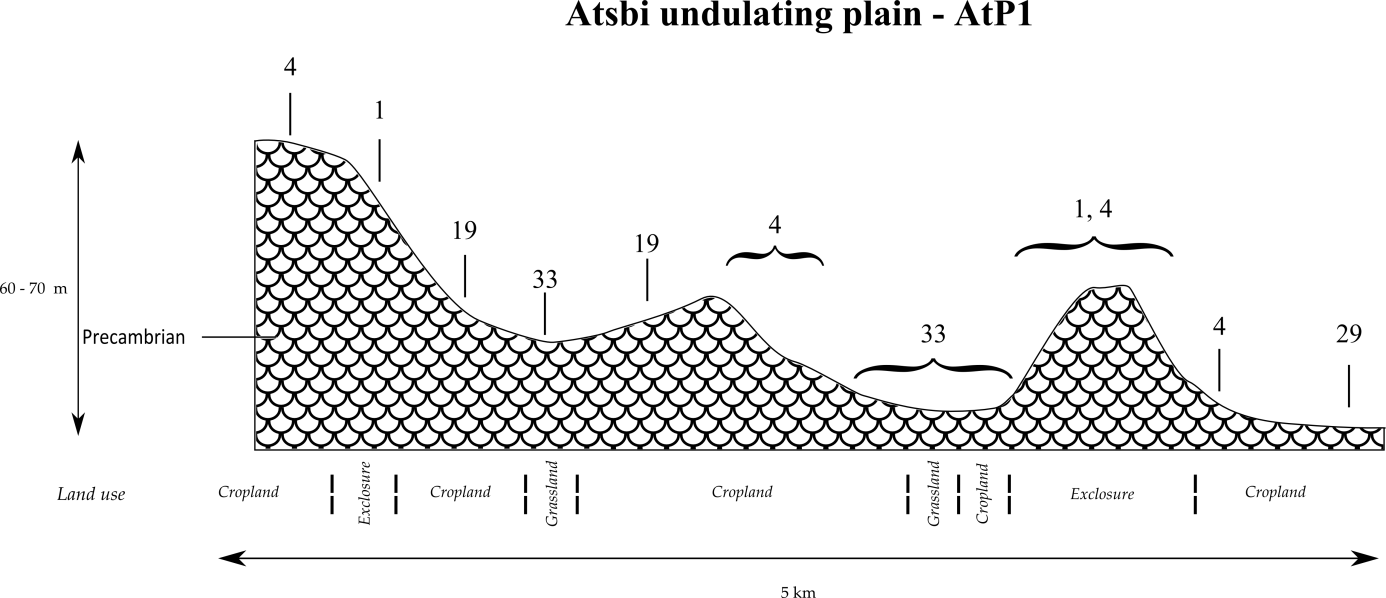
Typical catena in the undulating plain on Precambrian rock (Atsbi Horst)

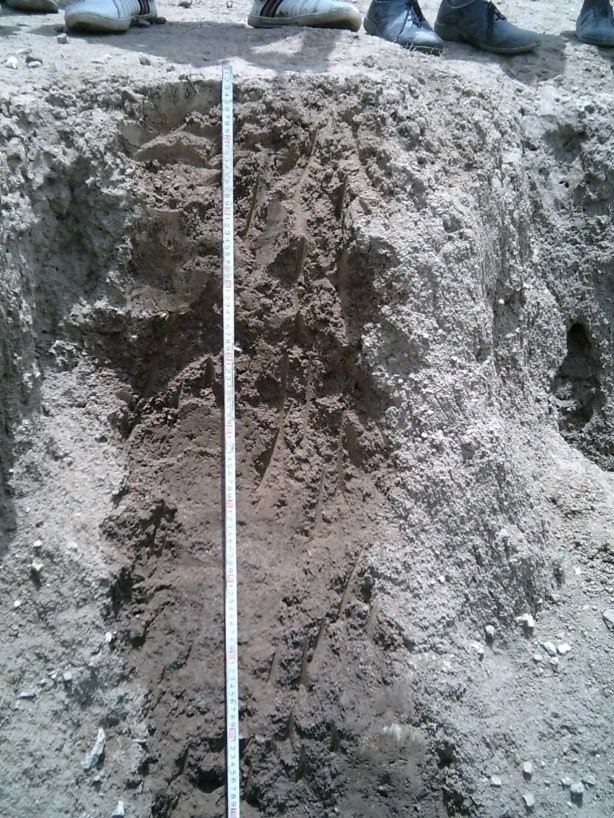
Haplic Fluvisol profile

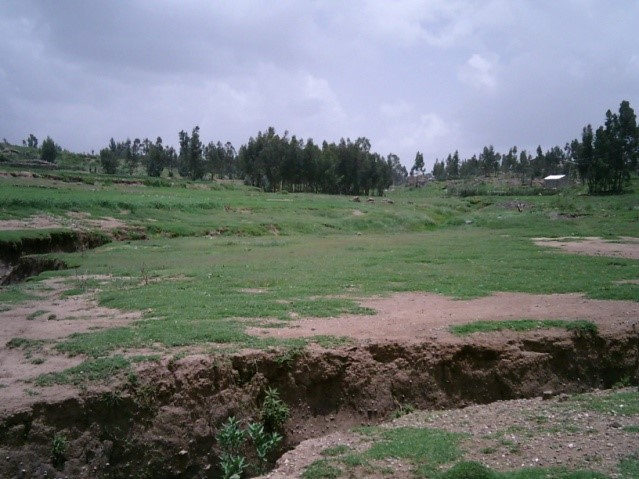
Haplic Fluvisol on Precambrian rock

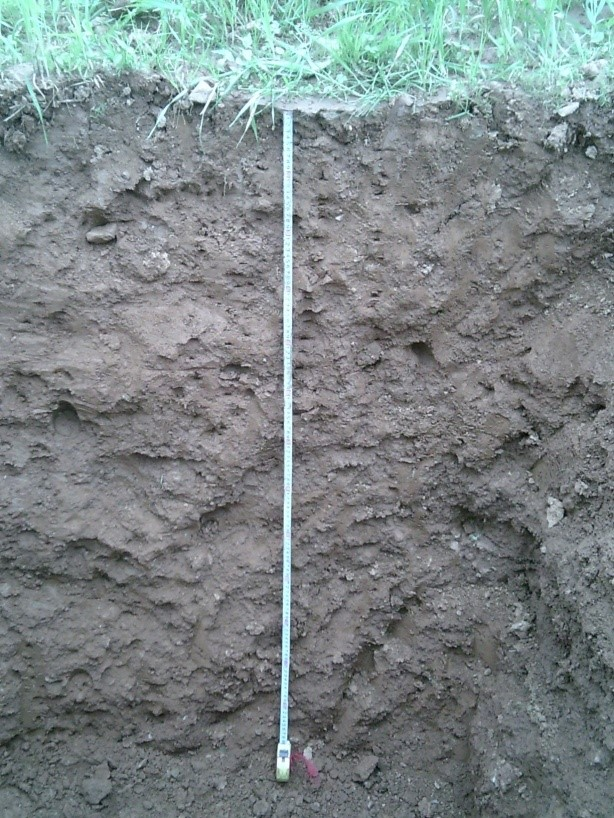
Haplic Cambisol profile

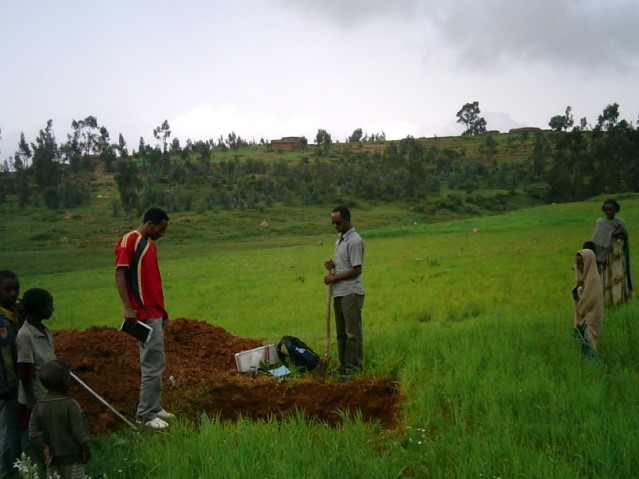
Haplic Cambisol

- Associated soil types
  - complex of rock outcrops, very stony and very shallow soils ((Lithic) Leptosol) (1)
  - shallow, very stony, silt loamy to loamy soils (Skeletic Cambisol, Leptic Cambisol, Skeletic Regosol) (4)
  - shallow to moderately deep silt loamy to loamy soils (Haplic Cambisol) (19)
- Inclusions
  - brown, silty loams to loamy sands developed on alluvium, with good natural fertility (Mollic) Fluvisol, Fluvic Cambisol (29)
  - clays of floodplains with very high watertable with moderate to good natural fertility (Eutric Gleysol, Gleyic Cambisol) (33)

=== Gently rolling topography on Precambrian rock (Atsbi Horst) ===
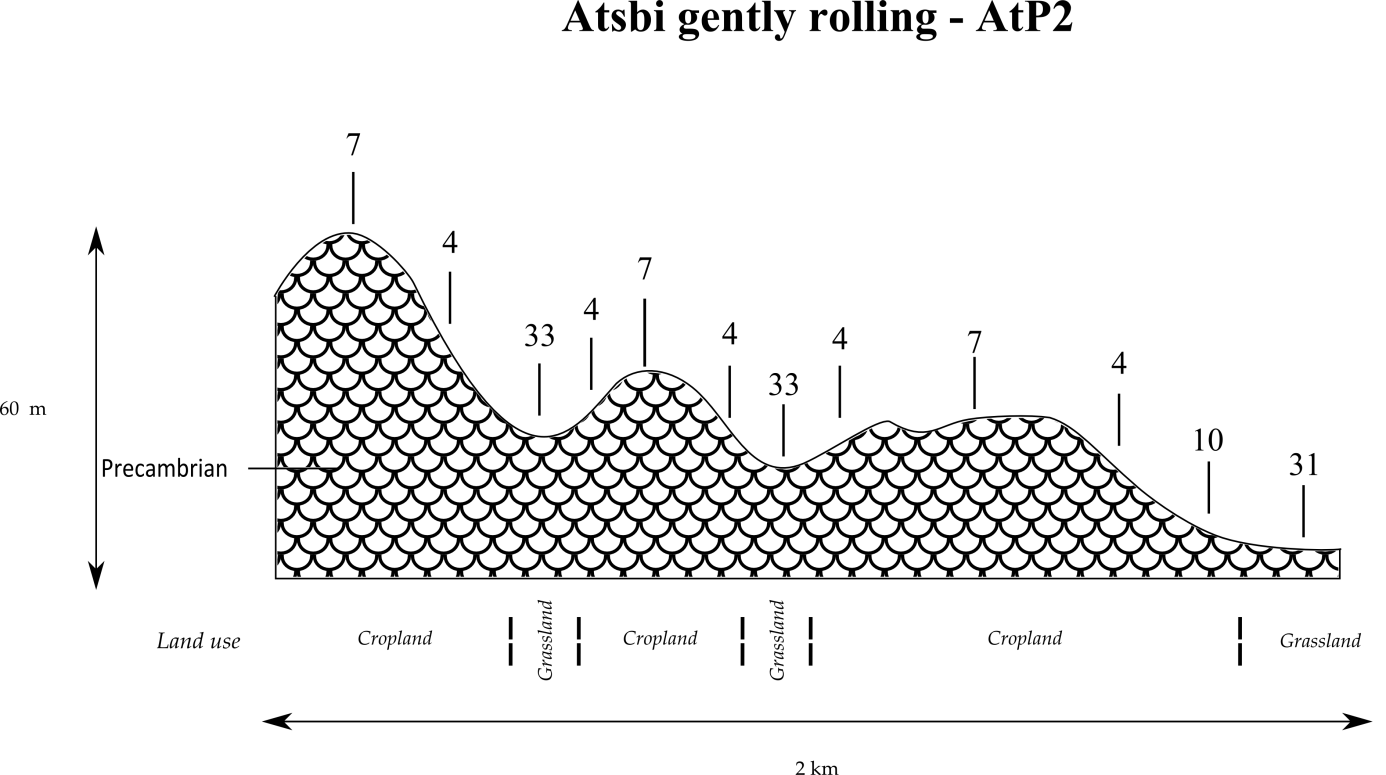
Typical catena in the gently rolling topography on Precambrian rock (Atsbi Horst)

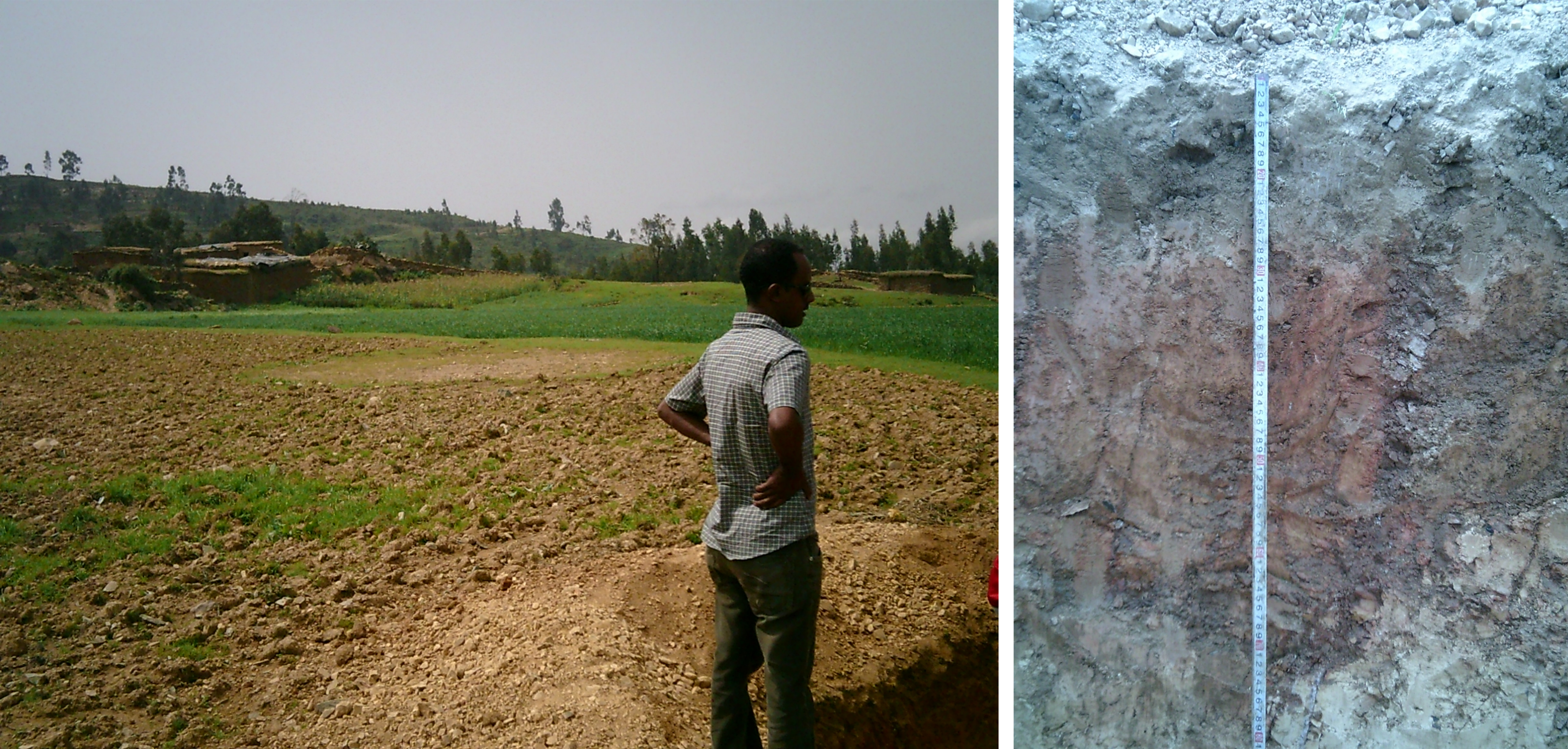
Leptic Luvisol on the Atsbi horst

- Associated soil types
  - shallow, very stony, silt loamy to loamy soils (Skeletic Cambisol, Leptic Cambisol, Skeletic Regosol) (4)
  - shallow to moderately deep, well drained, brown-yellow loamy soils (Leptic Luvisol) (7)
- Inclusions
  - moderately deep dark stony clays with good natural fertility (Vertic Cambisol) (10)
  - moderately to deep, dark brown to dark greyish soils with strong structure and good natural fertility, but with frequent waterlogging (Gleyic Vertisol) (31)
  - clays of floodplains with very high watertable with moderate to good natural fertility (Eutric Gleysol, Gleyic Cambisol) (33)

=== Rolling landscape on Precambrian rocks (Atsbi horst) ===
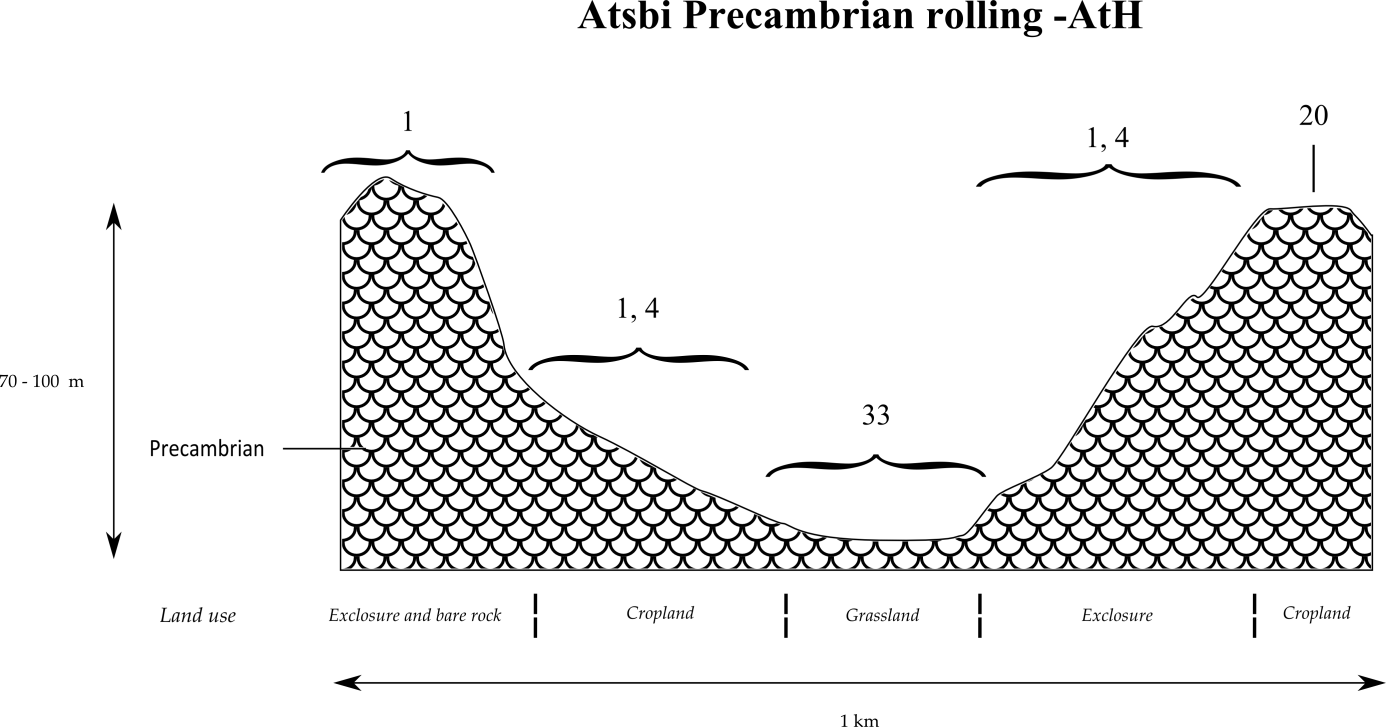
Typical catena on rolling topography on Precambrian rock (Atsbi Horst)

- Dominant soil type: complex of rock outcrops, very stony and very shallow soils ((Lithic) Leptosol) (1)
- Associated soil types
  - shallow, very stony, silt loamy to loamy soils (Skeletic Cambisol, Leptic Cambisol, Skeletic Regosol) (4)
  - clays of floodplains with very high watertable with moderate to good natural fertility (Eutric Gleysol, Gleyic Cambisol) (33)
- Inclusion: moderately deep, red-brownish, loamy soils with a good natural fertility (Chromic Luvisol) (20)

=== Severely incised Precambrian rock ===
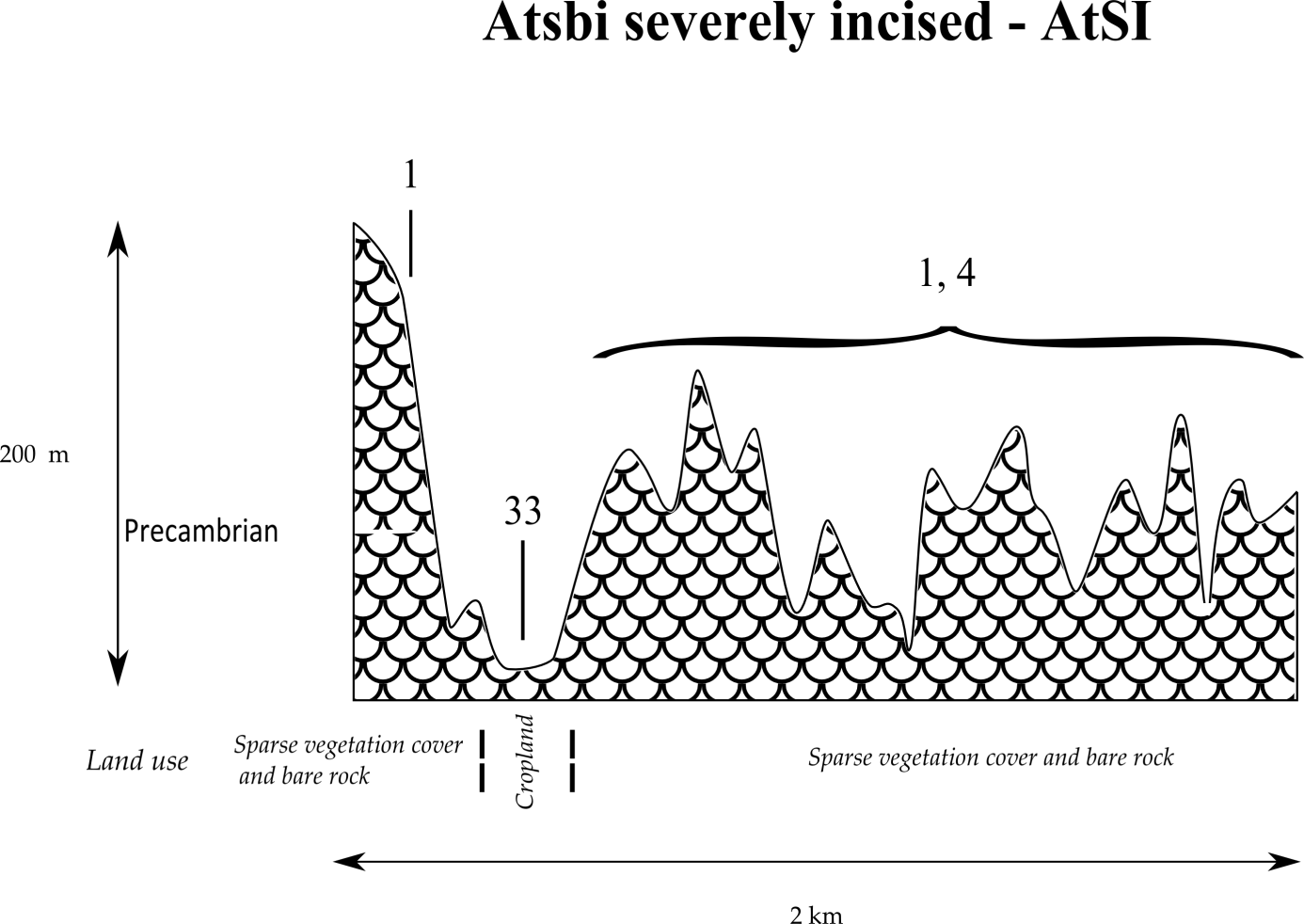
Typical catena on severely incised Precambrian rock (Atsbi Horst)

- Dominant soil type: rock outcrops and very shallow soils (Lithic Leptosol) (1)
- Associated soil type: shallow, very stony, silt loamy to loamy soils (Skeletic Cambisol, Leptic Cambisol, Skeletic Regosol) (4)
- Inclusion: clays of floodplains with very high watertable with moderate to good natural fertility (Eutric Gleysol, Gleyic Cambisol) (33)

=== Fluvial landscape of Hayqi Mesal ===
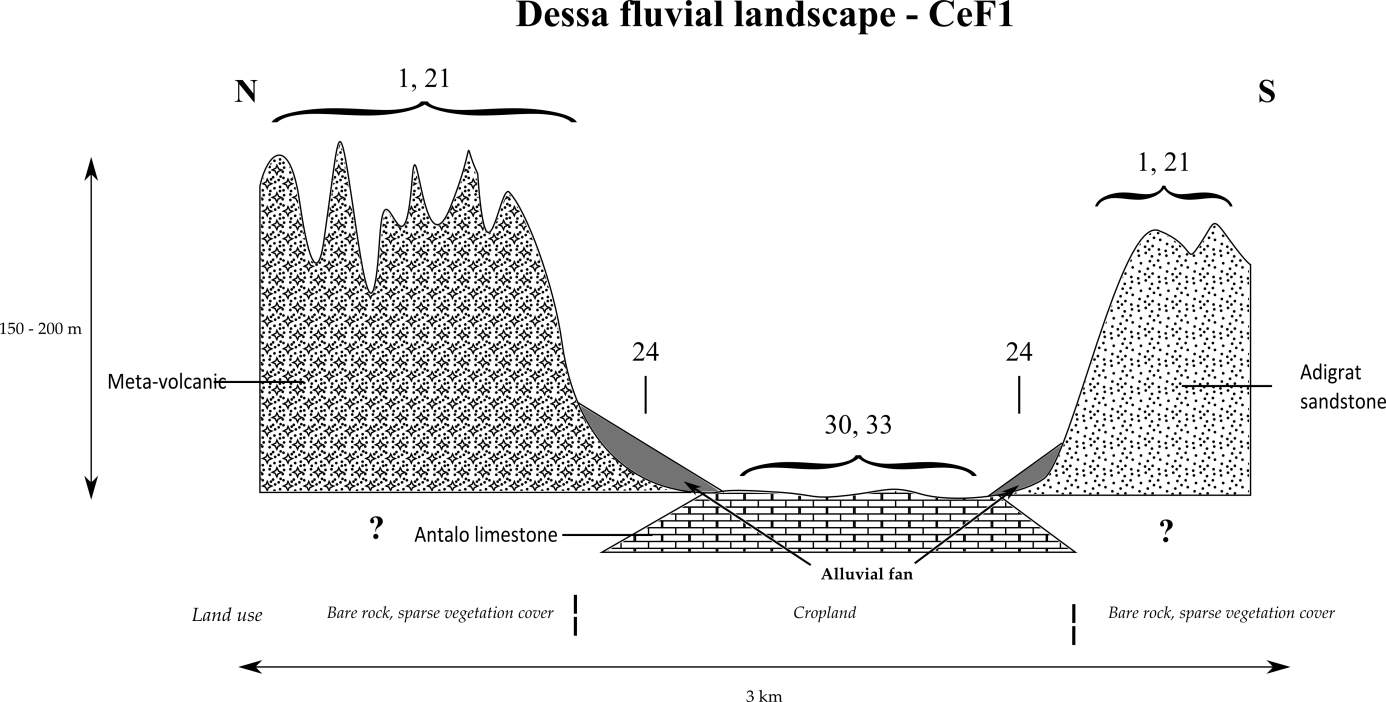
Typical catena in the fluvial landscape of Hayqi Mesal

- Associated soil types
  - complex of rock outcrops, very stony and very shallow soils ((Lithic) Leptosol) (1)
  - shallow, stony loam soils with moderate fertility (Eutric Regosol and Cambisol) (21)
  - Brown to dark, silty clay loams to loamy sands developed on alluvium, with good natural fertility (Fluvisol) (30)
- Inclusions
  - sandy clay loams to sands developed on sandy colluvium (Eutric Arenosol, Regosol, Cambisol) (24)
  - sandy clay loams to sands developed on sandy colluvium (Eutric Arenosol, Regosol, Cambisol) (24)

=== Des'a forest ===
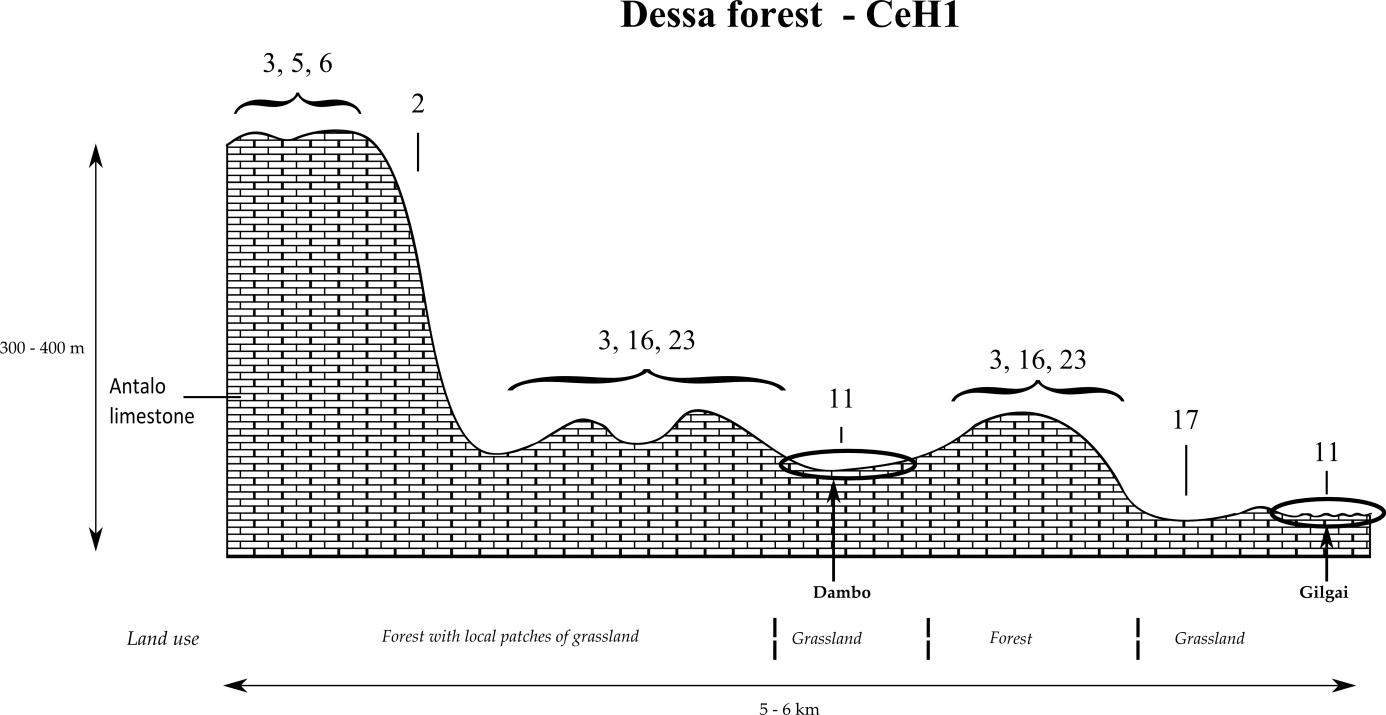
Typical catena in Des'a forest

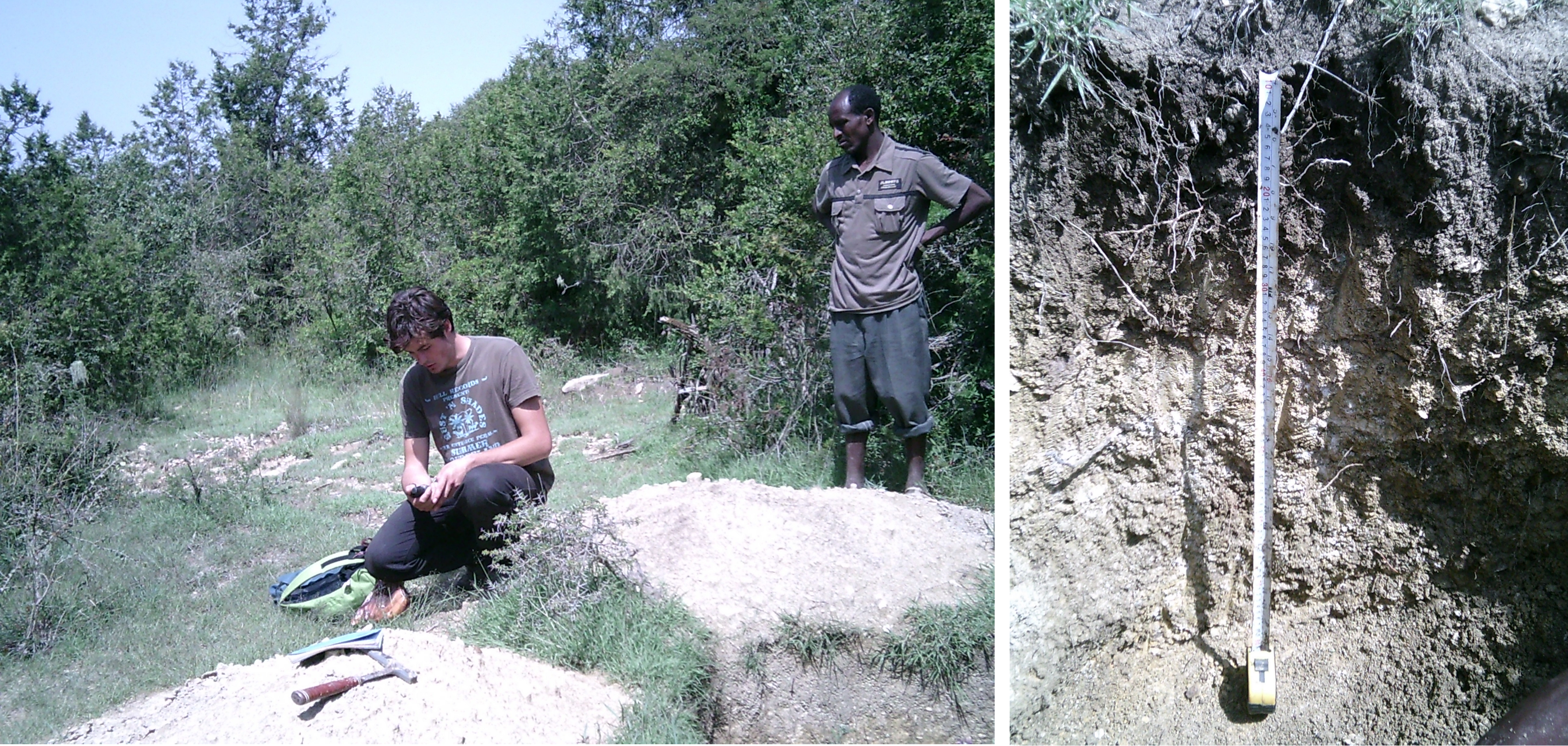
Mollic Calcaric Cambisol in Des'a Forest

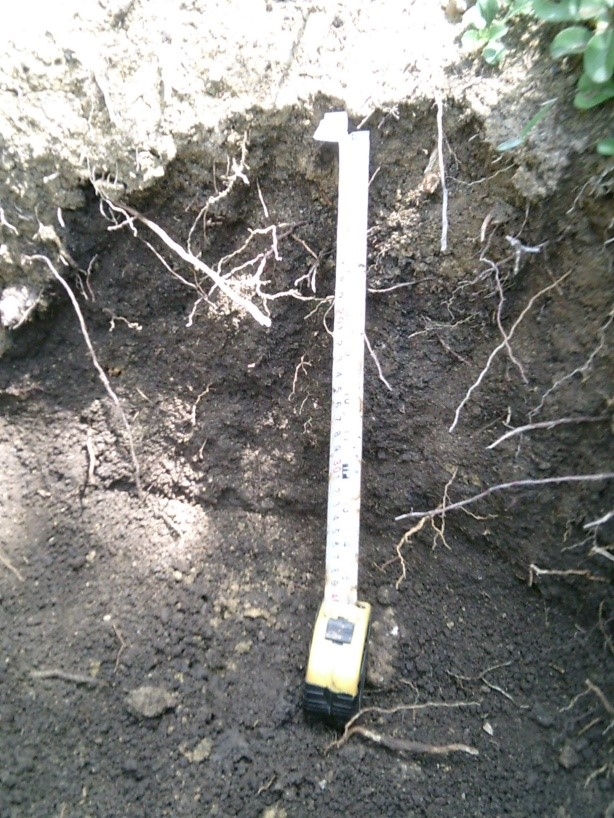
Rendzic Leptosol in Desa Forest Ethiopia profile

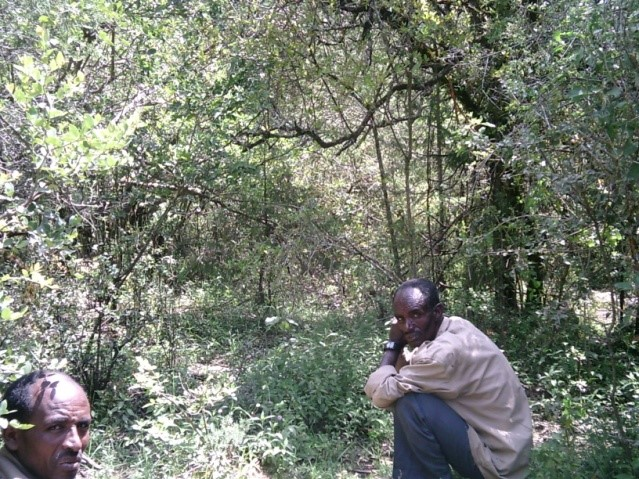
Rendzic Leptosol in Desa Forest Ethiopia

- Associated soil types
  - shallow, stony, dark, loamy soils on calcaric material (Rendzic Leptosol) (3)
  - deep, dark cracking clays on calcaric material (Calcaric Vertisol, Calcic Vertisol) (11)
  - dark soils with good developed structure and a very good natural fertility on calcaric material (Vertic Calcaric Phaeozem) (16)
  - shallow, dark, stony, loamy soils on calcaric material, rich on organic matter (Calcaric Mollic Cambisol) (23)
- Inclusions
  - Rock outcrops and very shallow soils on limestone (Calcaric Leptosol) (2)
  - Shallow very stony loamy soil on limestone (Skeletic Calcaric Cambisol) (5)
  - Shallow, dark loamy soils with a good natural fertility (Rendzic and Leptic Phaeozem (6)
  - Moderately deep, stony, dark cracking clays on calcaric material (Calcaric Vertic Cambisol) (17)

=== Gallery: soils in Des'a forest ===
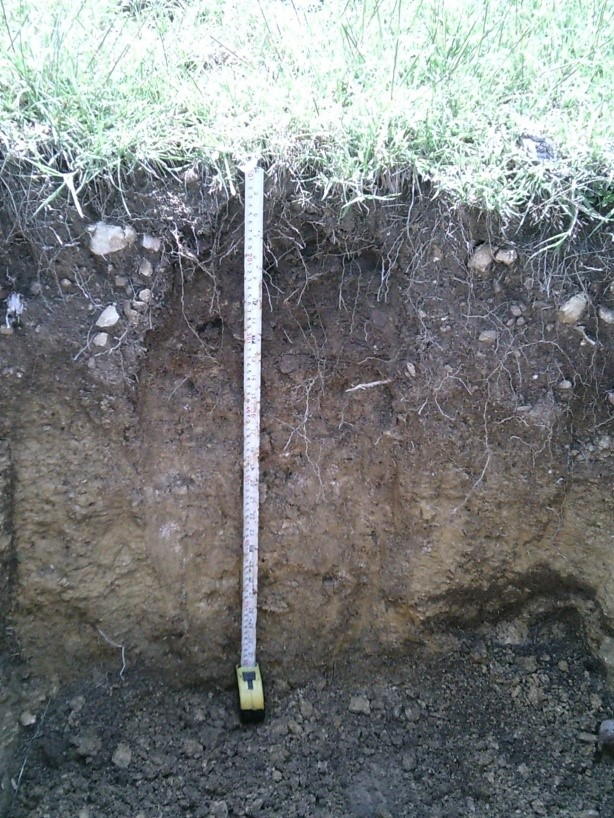
Mollic Calcaric Cambisol

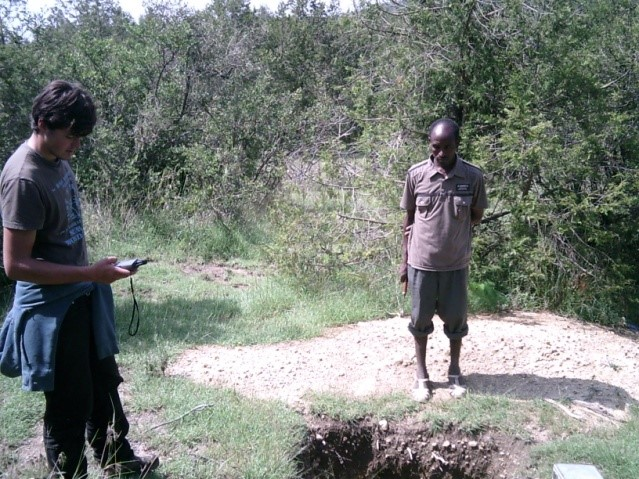
Mollic Calcaric Cambisol

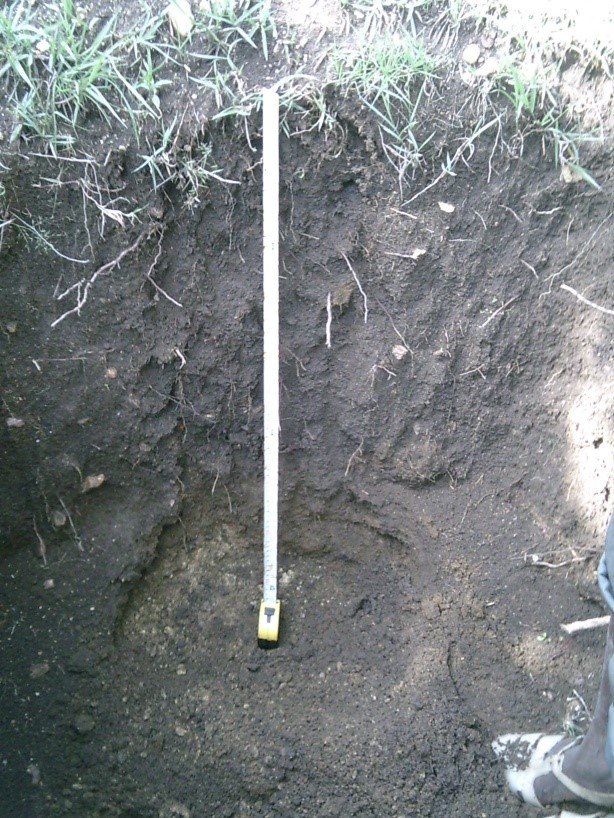
Vertic Calcaric Phaeozem

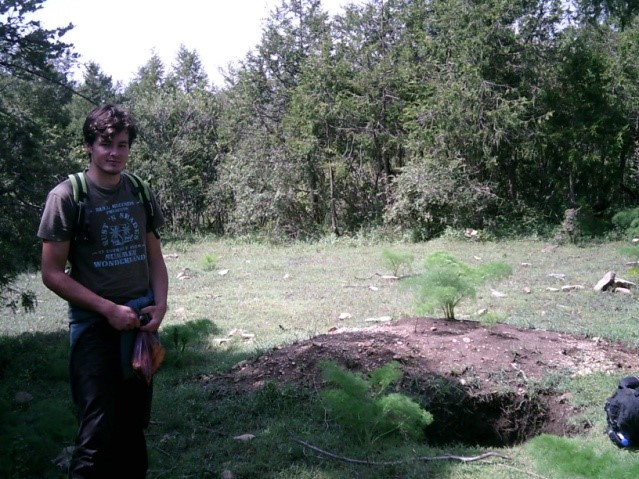
Vertic Calcaric Phaeozem

=== Des'a hills ===
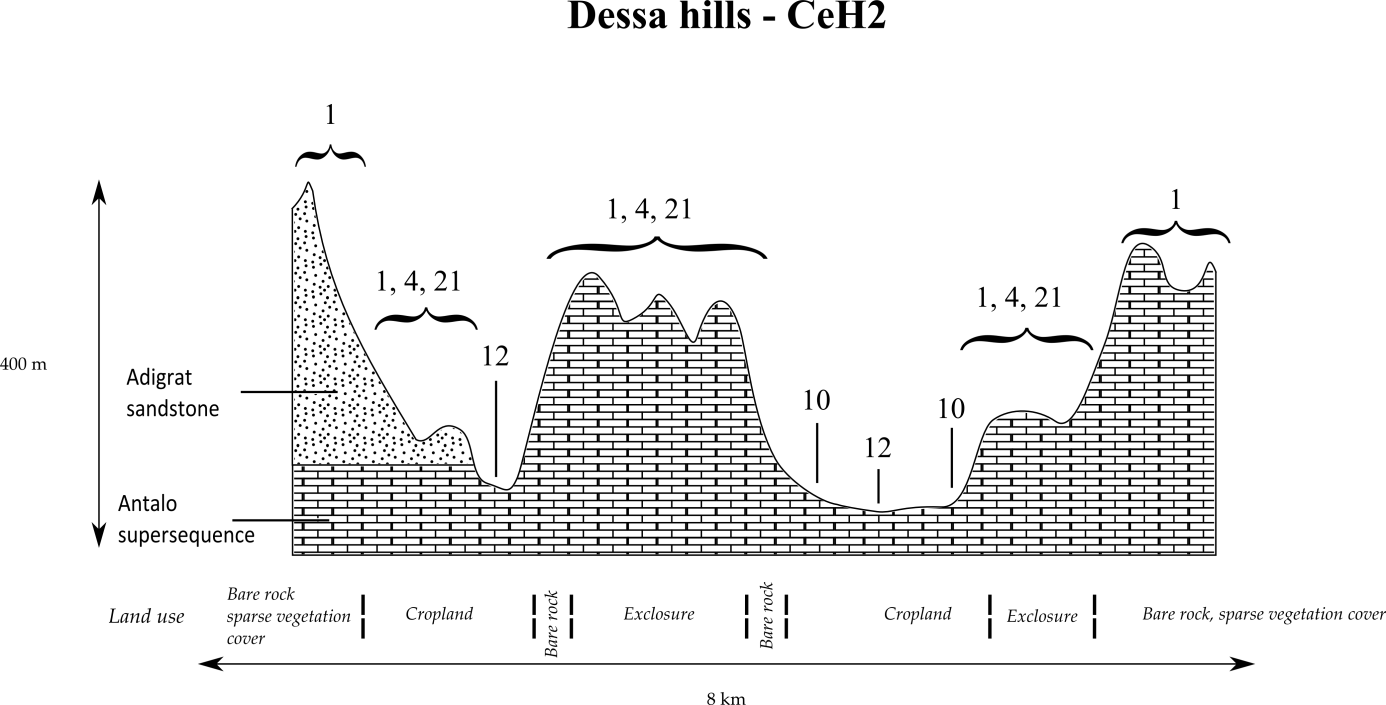
Typical catena in the Des'a hills

- Associated soil types
  - complex of rock outcrops, very stony and very shallow soils ((Lithic) Leptosol) (1)
  - shallow, very stony, silt loamy to loamy soils (Skeletic Cambisol, Leptic Cambisol, Skeletic Regosol) (4)
  - shallow, stony loam soils with moderate fertility (Eutric Regosol and Cambisol) (21)
- Inclusions
  - moderately deep dark stony clays with good natural fertility (Vertic Cambisol) (10)
  - deep dark cracking clays with very good natural fertility, waterlogged during the wet season (Chromic Vertisol, Pellic Vertisol) (12)

=== Alluvial plains induced by tufa dams ===
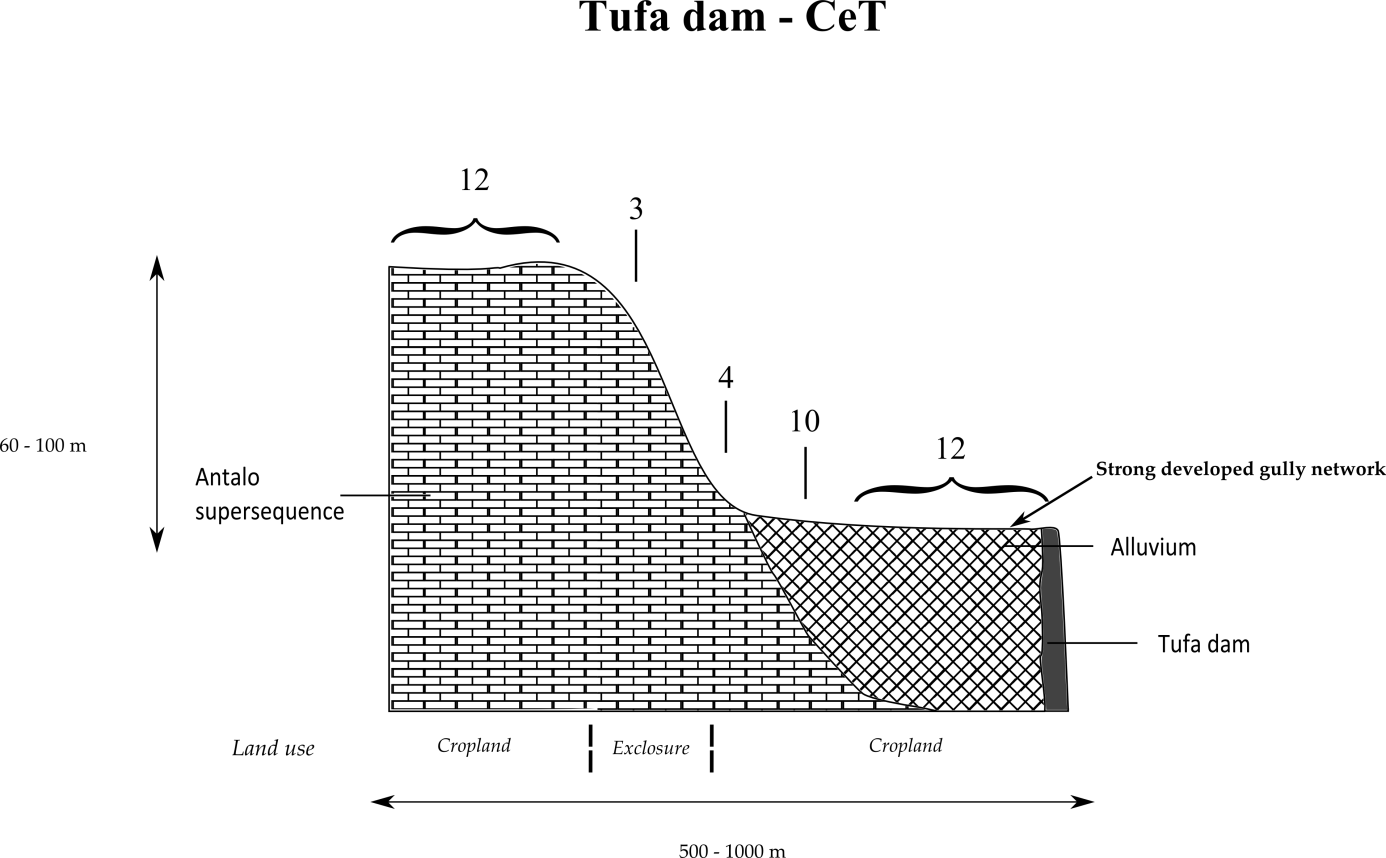
Typical catena on Tufa dam backfill

- Dominant soil type: deep dark cracking clays with very good natural fertility, waterlogged during the wet season (Chromic Vertisol, Pellic Vertisol) (12)
- Associated soil type: stony, dark cracking clays with good natural fertility (Vertic Cambisol) (10)
- Inclusions
  - shallow, stony, dark, loamy soils on calcaric material (Rendzic Leptosol) (3)
  - shallow, very stony, silt loamy to loamy soils (Skeletic Cambisol, Leptic Cambisol, Skeletic Regosol) (4)

=== Polje ===
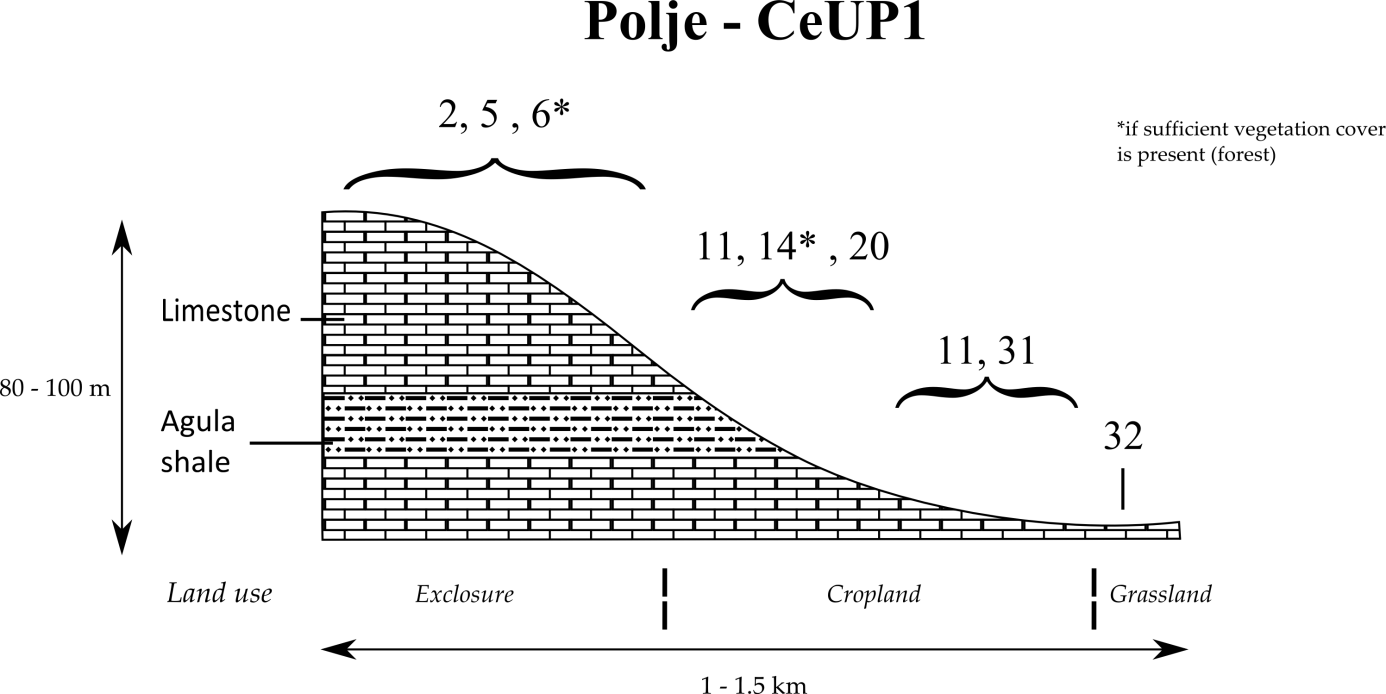
Typical catena in the Lugdo polje

- Associated soil types
  - Rock outcrops and very shallow soils on limestone (Calcaric Leptosol) (2)
  - Shallow very stony loamy soil on limestone (Skeletic Calcaric Cambisol) (5)
  - Shallow, dark loamy soils with a good natural fertility (Rendzic and Leptic Phaeozem (6)
  - deep, dark cracking clays on calcaric material (Calcaric Vertisol, Calcic Vertisol) (11)
- Inclusions
  - Dark, loamy soils with good developed structure and a very good natural fertility (Vertic Phaeozem) (14)
  - moderately deep, red-brownish, loamy soils with a good natural fertility (Chromic Luvisol) (20)
  - moderately to deep, dark brown to dark greyish soils with strong structure and good natural fertility, but with frequent waterlogging (Gleyic Vertisol) (31)
  - alluvial clays of flood plains and basins with ponded drainage on calcaric material (Calcaric Gleysol) (32)

=== Very gently undulating Agula shale ===
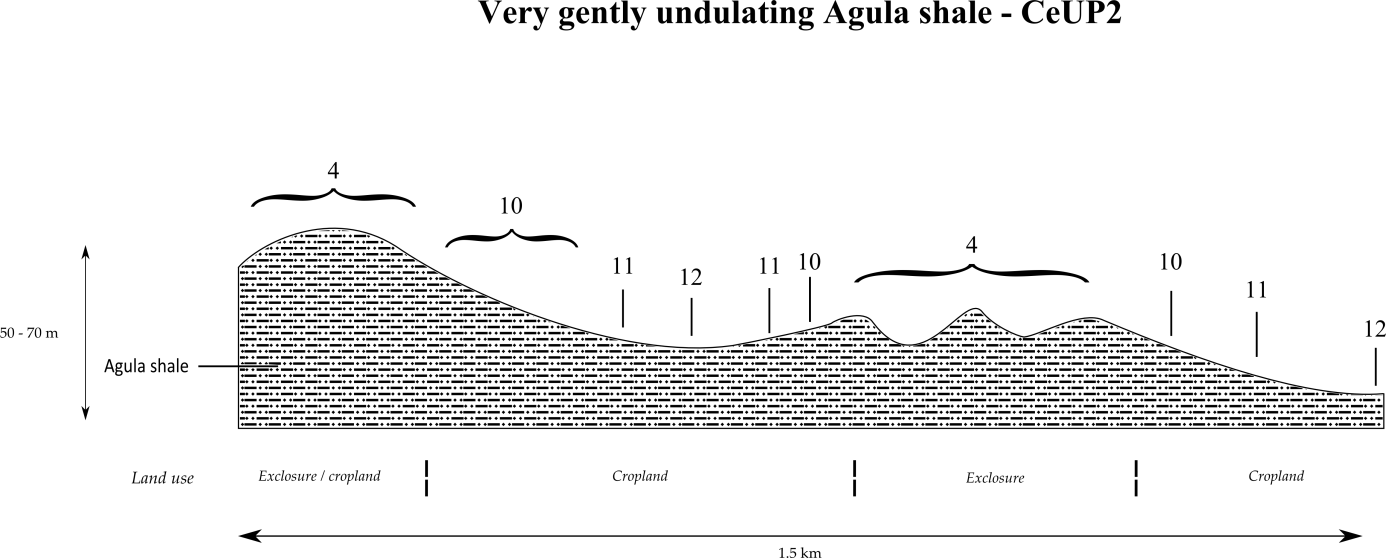
Typical catena in the very gently undulating Agula shale

- Associated soil types
  - shallow, very stony, silt loamy to loamy soils (Skeletic Cambisol, Leptic Cambisol, Skeletic Regosol) (4)
  - moderately deep dark stony clays with good natural fertility (Vertic Cambisol) (10)
  - deep, dark cracking clays on calcaric material (Calcaric Vertisol, Calcic Vertisol) (11)
- Inclusion: deep dark cracking clays with very good natural fertility, waterlogged during the wet season (Chromic Vertisol, Pellic Vertisol) (12)

== Soil erosion and conservation ==
The reduced soil protection by vegetation cover, combined with steep slopes and erosive rainfall has led to excessive soil erosion. Nutrients and organic matter were lost and soil depth was reduced. Hence, soil erosion is an important problem, which results in low crop yields and biomass production. As a response to the strong degradation and thanks to the hard labour of many people in the villages, soil conservation has been carried out on a large scale since the 1980s and especially 1980s; this has curbed rates of soil loss. Measures include the construction of infiltration trenches, stone bunds, check dams, small reservoirs such as Addi Shihu and Era as well as a major biological measure: exclosures in order to allow forest regeneration. On the other hand, it remains difficult to convince farmers to carry out measures within the farmland (in situ soil management), such as bed and furrows or zero grazing, as there is a fear for loss of income from the land. Such techniques are however very effective.
