= Soil in Kola Tembien =

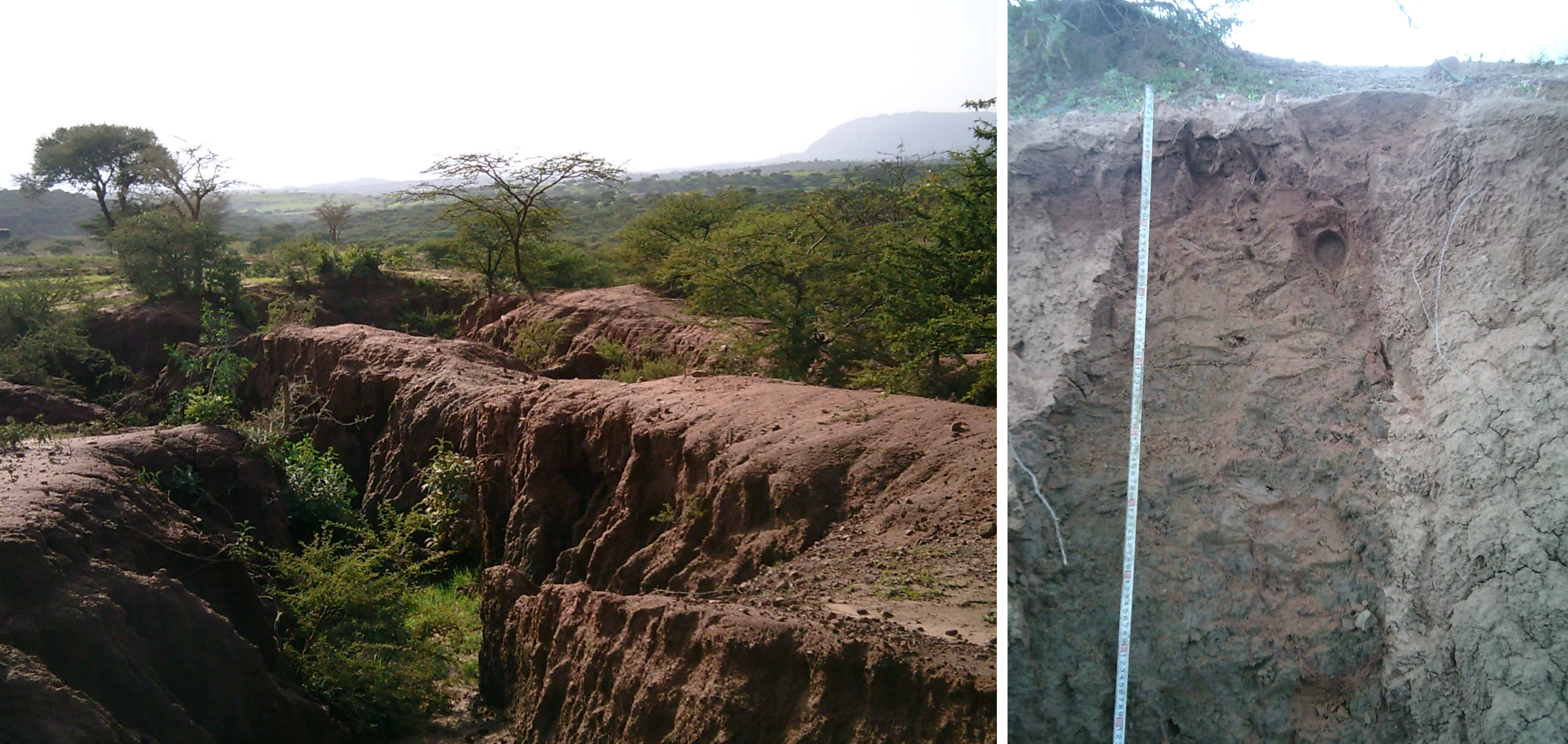
Haplic Planosol near Abiy Addi

The soils of the Kola Tembien woreda (district) in Tigray (Ethiopia) reflect its longstanding agricultural history, highly seasonal rainfall regime, relatively high temperatures, overall dominance of sandstone and metamorphic lithology and steep slopes.

== Factors contributing to soil diversity ==
=== Climate ===
Annual rainfall depth is very variable from year to year, but also from place to place. Whereas, there is around 500 mm annual rainfall near Tekezé River, this increases to 1600 mm in Abiy Addi, which benefits from the orographic rains induced by the Dogu'a Tembien massif. Most rains fall during the main rainy season, which typically extends from June to September. Mean temperature in woreda town Abiy Addi is 22.4 °C, oscillating between average daily minimum of 12.8 °C and maximum of 31.5 °C. The contrasts between day and night air temperatures are much larger than seasonal contrasts.

=== Geology ===
From the higher to the lower locations, the following geological formations are present:

- Interbedded lacustrine deposits
- Lower basalt
- Adigrat Sandstone
- Enticho Sandstone
- Edaga Arbi Glacials
- Precambrian metamorphic rocks

=== Topography ===
As part of the Ethiopian Highlands the land has undergone a rapid tectonic uplift, leading the occurrence of mountain peaks, plateaus, valleys and gorges.

=== Land use ===
Generally speaking the level lands and intermediate slopes are occupied by cropland, while there is rangeland and shrubs on the steeper slopes. Remnant forests occur around Orthodox Christian churches and a few inaccessible places. A recent trend is the widespread planting of eucalyptus trees.

=== Environmental changes ===
Soil degradation in this district became important when humans started deforestation almost 5000 years ago. Depending on land use history, locations have been exposed in varying degrees to such land degradation.

== Geomorphic regions and soil units ==
Detailed information on soils is available for the southern part of the district which is part of the Giba River catchment. Given the complex geology and topography of the district, it has been organised into land systems - areas with specific and unique geomorphic and geological characteristics, characterised by a particular soil distribution along the soil catena. Soil types are classified in line with World Reference Base for Soil Resources and reference made to main characteristics that can be observed in the field.

=== Basalt plateaus ===
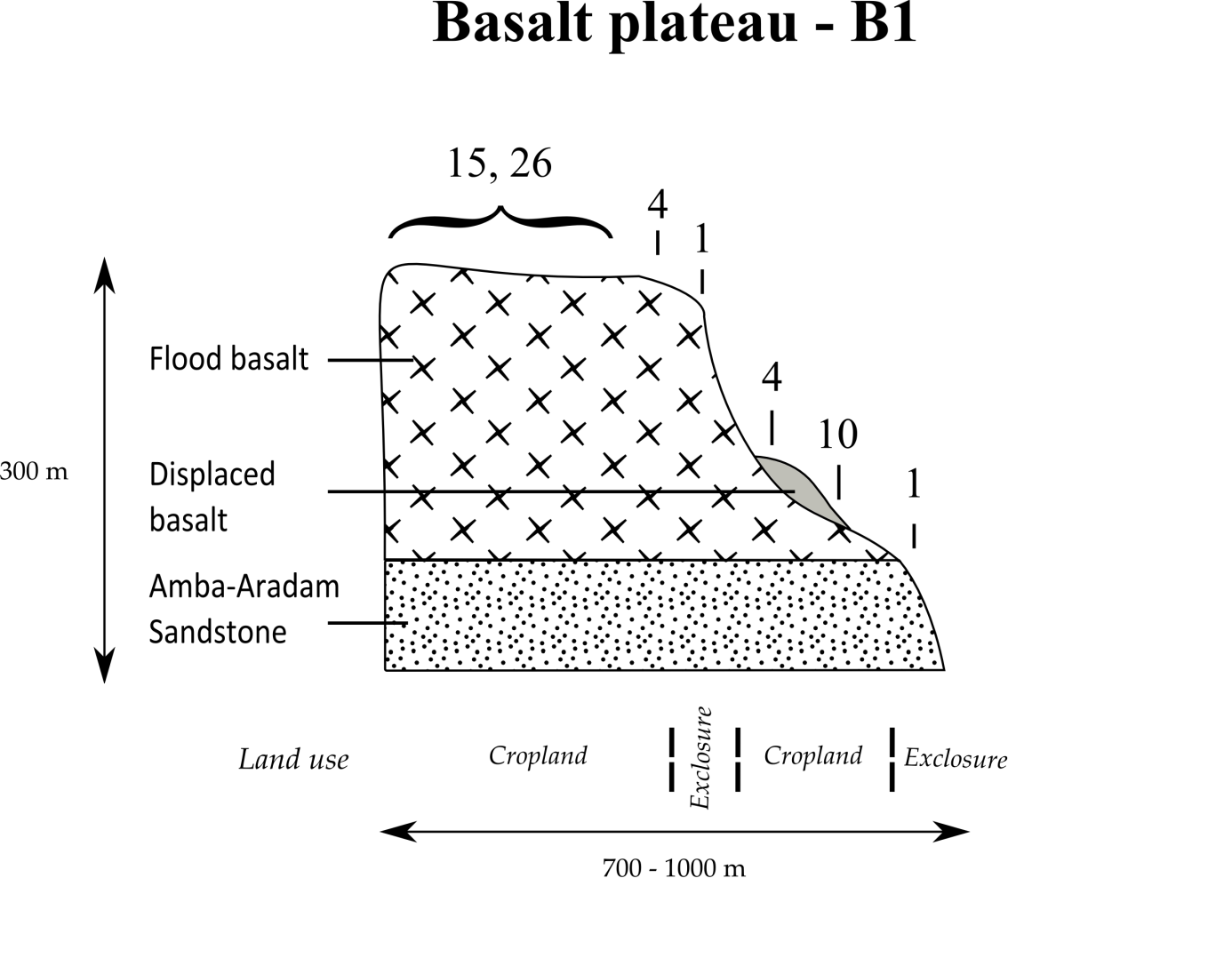
Typical catena on the Basalt plateaus

- Associated soil types
  - shallow, very stony, loamy soils (Leptic and Skeletic Cambisol and Regosol) (4)
  - deep, very dark clays with strong structure and very good natural fertility, temporarily waterlogged during the wet season (Vertisol) (15)
  - moderately deep, brown, loamy soils with a good natural fertility (Luvisol) (26)
- Inclusions
  - complex of rock outcrops, very stony and very shallow soils ((Lithic) Leptosol) (1)
  - moderately deep, stony, dark cracking clays (Vertic Cambisol) (10)

=== Adigrat Sandstone cliff and footslope ===
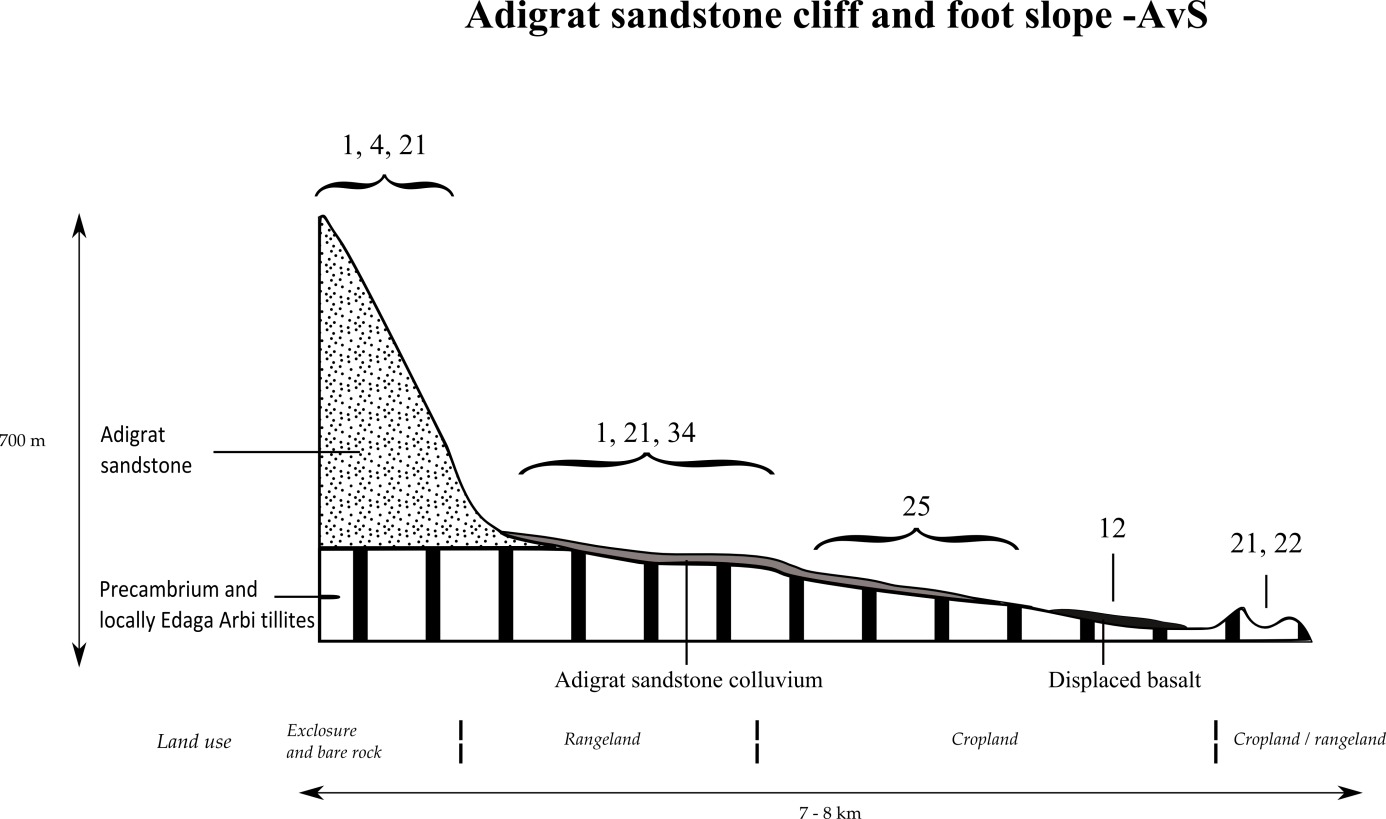
Typical catena on the Adigrat Sandstone cliff and footslope

- Associated soil types
  - complex of rock outcrops, very stony and very shallow soils ((Lithic) Leptosol) (1)
  - shallow, stony sandy [[loam soils (Eutric Regosol and Cambisol) (21)
- Inclusions
  - shallow, dry soils with very high amounts of stones (Leptic and Skeletic Cambisol and Regosol) (4)
  - deep, dark cracking clays with good fertility, but problems of waterlogging (Chromic and Pellic Vertisol) (12)
  - soils with stagnating water due to an abrupt textural change such as sand over clay (Haplic Planosol]]) (34)

=== Severely incised granite near Giba mouth ===
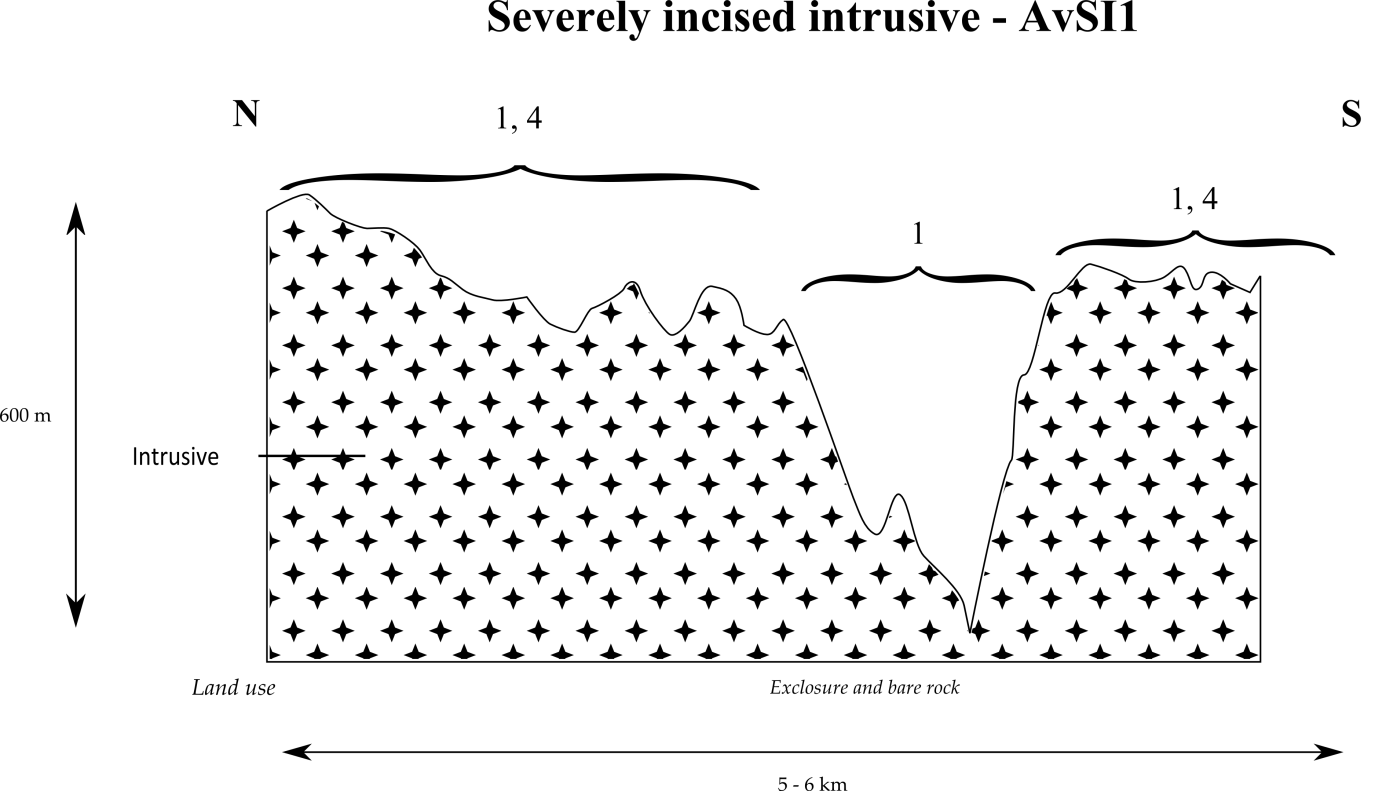
Typical catena on severely incised granite near Giba mouth

- Dominant soil type: rock outcrops and very shallow soils (Lithic Leptosol) (1)
- Associated soil type: shallow, very stony, silt loamy to loamy soils (Skeletic Cambisol, Leptic Cambisol, Skeletic Regosol) (4)

=== Severely incised metamorphic sedimentary rock ===
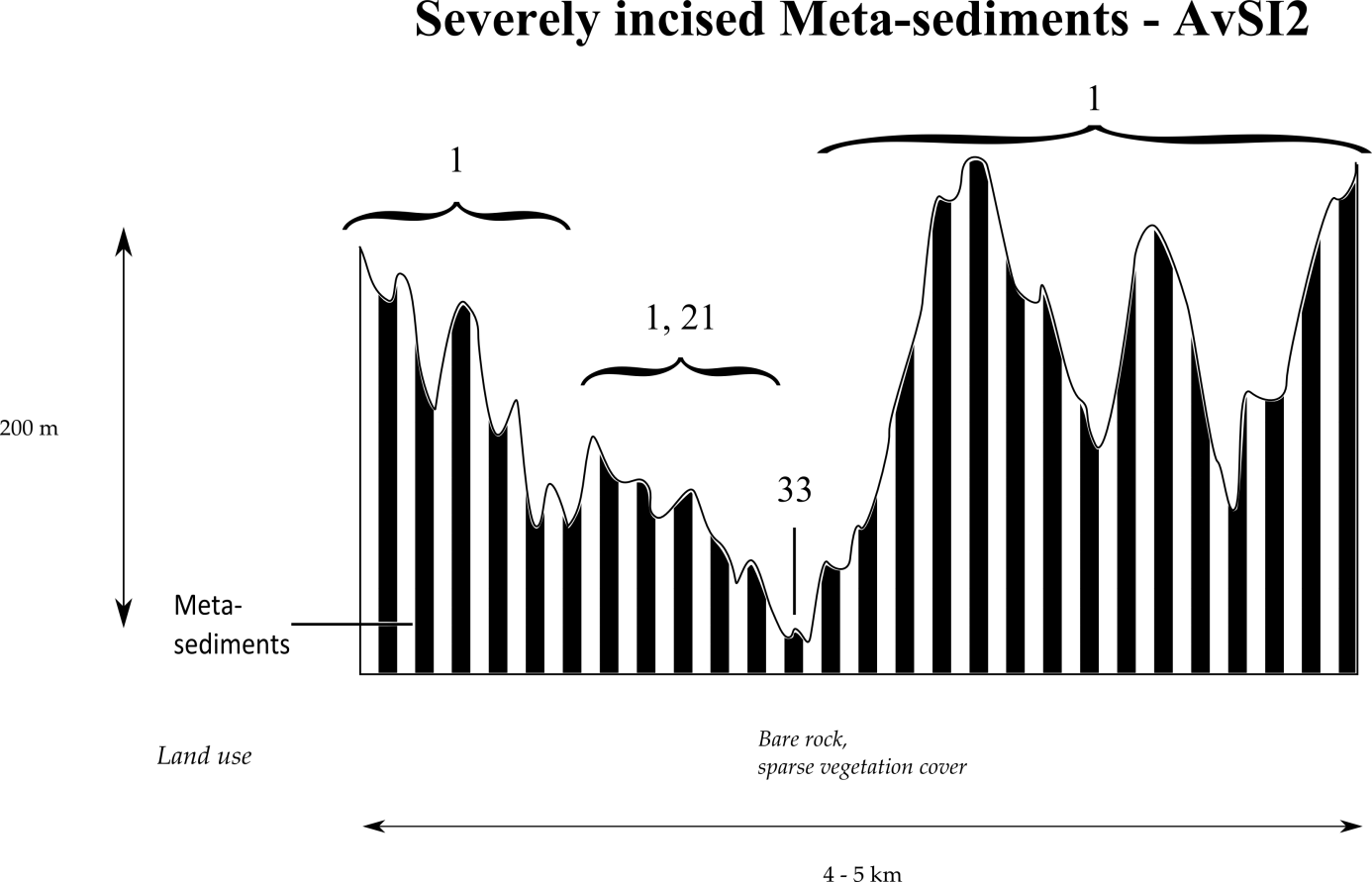
Severely incised metamorphic sedimentary rock

- Dominant soil type: rock outcrops and very shallow soils (Lithic Leptosol) (1)
- Associated soil type: shallow, stony loam soils (Eutric Regosol and Cambisol) (21)
- Inclusion: clays of floodplains with very high watertable with moderate to good natural fertility (Eutric Gleysol, Gleyic Cambisol) (33)

=== Soils on metamorphic volcanic rock ===
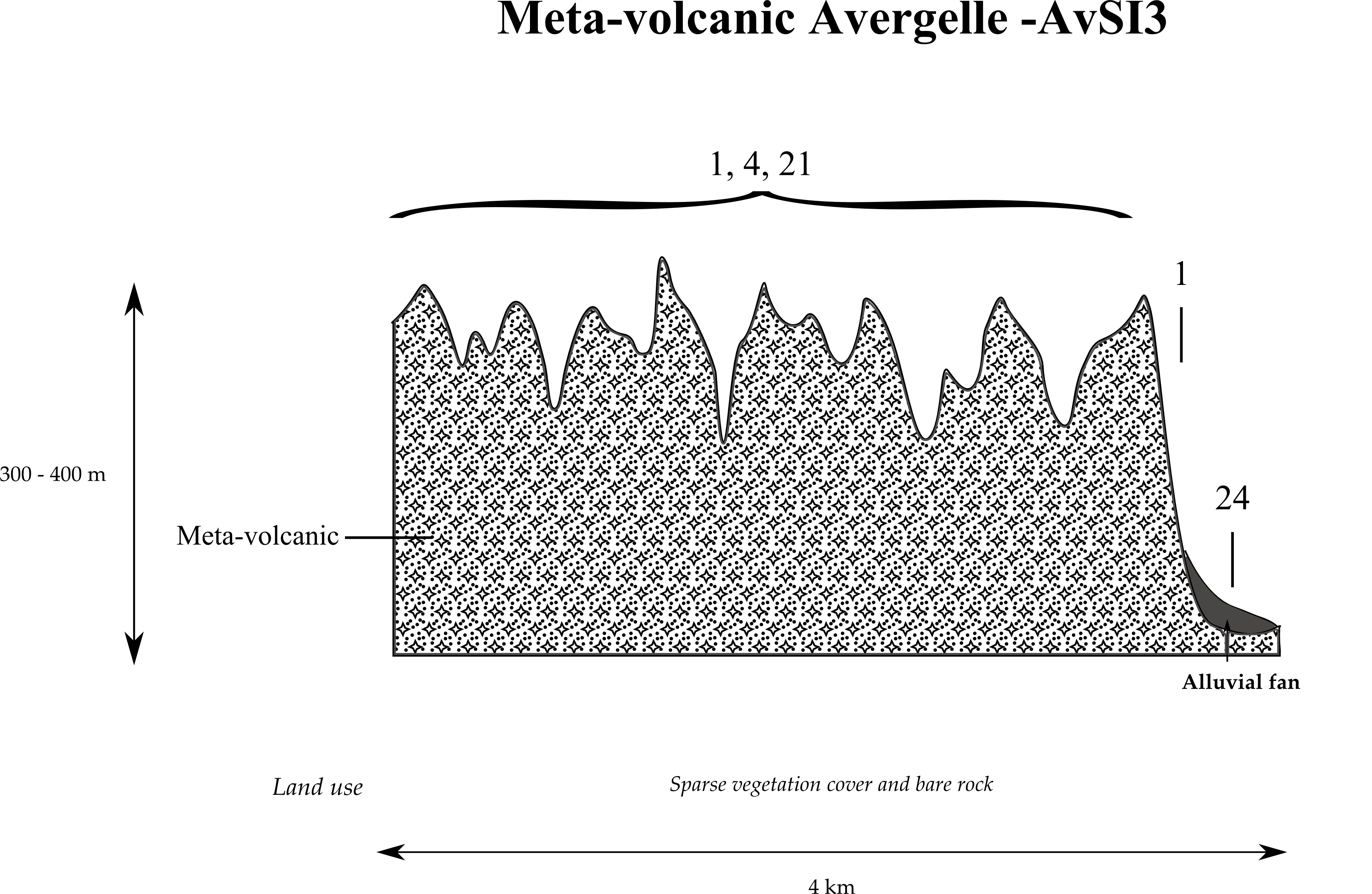
Typical catena on metamorphic volcanic rock

- Dominant soil type: rock outcrops and very shallow soils (Lithic Leptosol) (1)
- Associated soil types
  - shallow, very stony, silt loamy to loamy soils (Skeletic Cambisol, Leptic Cambisol, Skeletic Regosol) (4)
  - shallow, stony loam soils (Eutric Regosol and Cambisol) (21)
- Inclusion: sandy clay loams to sands developed on sandy colluvium (Eutric Arenosol, Regosol, Cambisol) (24)

== Soil erosion and conservation ==
The reduced soil protection by vegetation cover, combined with steep slopes and erosive rainfall has led to excessive soil erosion. Nutrients and organic matter were lost and soil depth was reduced. Hence, soil erosion is an important problem, which results in low crop yields and biomass production. As a response to the strong degradation and thanks to the hard labour of many people in the villages, soil conservation has been carried out on a large scale since the 1980s and especially 1980s; this has curbed rates of soil loss. Measures include the construction of infiltration trenches, stone bunds, check dams, small reservoirs such as Addi Asme'e as well as a major biological measure: exclosures in order to allow forest regeneration.
