= Felaga =

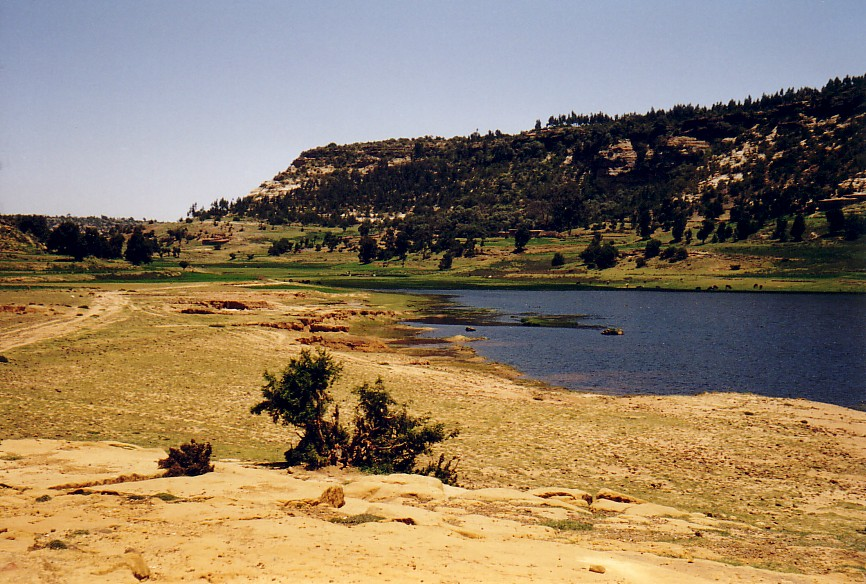

- Location within Ethiopia
- Coordinates: 13.90960685°N 39.76514512°E
- Type: Freshwater artificial lake
- Basin countries: Ethiopia
- Surface area: 0.2153 km^{2} (0.0831 sq mi)
- Water volume: 0.9×10^{6} m^{3} (730 acre⋅ft)
- Surface elevation: 2,786 m (9,140 ft)
- Settlements: Atsbi

Felaga is a reservoir located in the Atsbi Wenberta woreda of the Tigray Region in Ethiopia. The earthen dam that holds the reservoir was built in 1996 by Tigray Bureau of Agriculture.

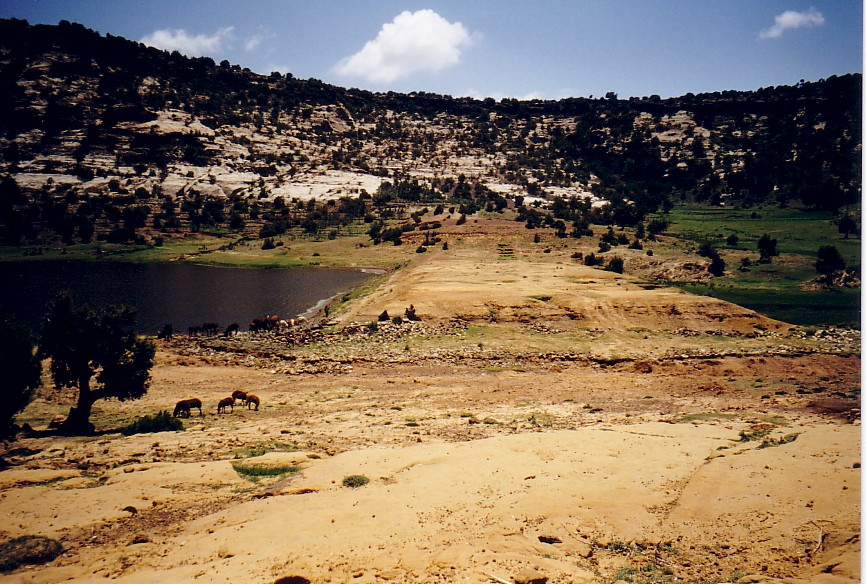

== Dam characteristics ==
- Dam height: 11.9 metres
- Dam crest length: 115 metres
- Spillway width: 15 metres

== Capacity ==
- Original capacity: 900000 m³
- Dead storage: 115000 m³
- Reservoir area: 21.53 ha

== Irrigation ==
- Designed irrigated area: 75 ha
- Actual irrigated area in 2002: 40 ha

== Environment ==
The catchment of the reservoir is 8.16 km² large. The reservoir suffers from rapid siltation. The lithology of the catchment is Enticho Sandstone and precambrian rock. Part of the water that could be used for irrigation is lost through seepage; the positive side-effect is that this contributes to groundwater recharge.
