= Era (reservoir) =

- Location within Ethiopia Location within Africa
- Coordinates: 13°41′35″N 39°46′00″E
- Type: Freshwater artificial lake
- Basin countries: Ethiopia
- Surface area: 0.37 km^{2} (0.14 sq mi)
- Water volume: 1.920000×10^{6} m^{3} (1,556.569 acre⋅ft)
- Settlements: Atsbi

Era is a reservoir located in the Atsbi Wenberta woreda of the Tigray Region in Ethiopia. The earthen dam that holds the reservoir was built in 1997 by SAERT.

== Dam characteristics ==
- Dam height: 16.73 metres
- Spillway width: 10 metres

== Capacity ==
- Original capacity: 1 920 000 m³
- Dead storage: 480 000 m³
- Reservoir area: 37 ha

== Irrigation ==
- Designed irrigated area: 100 ha
- Actual irrigated area in 2002: 95 ha

== Environment ==
The catchment of the reservoir is 16 km^{2} large. The reservoir suffers from rapid siltation. Part of the water that could be used for irrigation is lost through seepage; the positive side-effect is that this contributes to groundwater recharge.
