= Addi Shihu =

Reservoir in Ethiopia

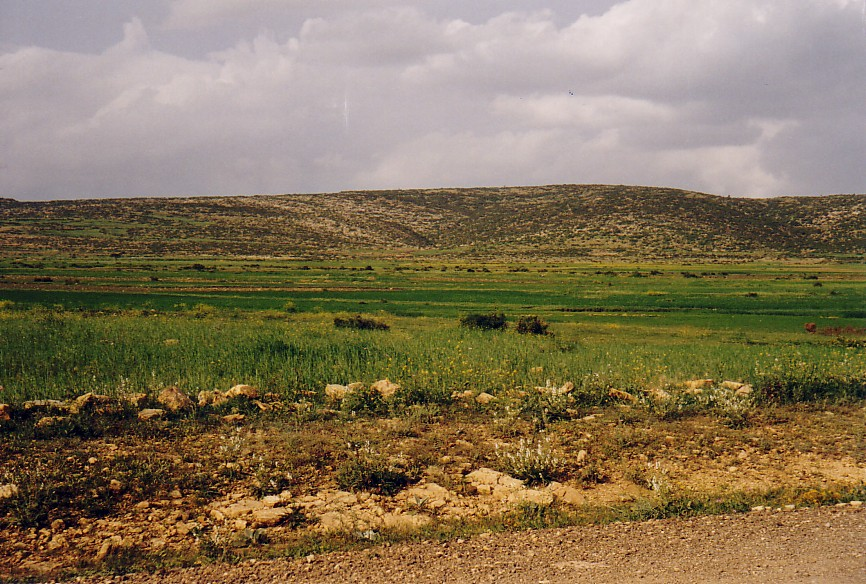
- Catchment of Addi Shihu reservoir

- Location within Ethiopia
- Coordinates: 13.6480°N 39.6946°E
- Type: Freshwater artificial lake
- Basin countries: Ethiopia
- Surface area: 0.36 km^{2} (0.14 sq mi)
- Water volume: 1×10^{6} m^{3} (810 acre⋅ft)
- Settlements: Atsbi

Addi Shihu is a reservoir located in the Atsbi Wenberta woreda of the Tigray Region in Ethiopia. The earthen dam that holds the reservoir was built in 1997 by SAERT.

== Dam characteristics ==
- Dam height: 10.8 metres
- Dam crest length: 301 metres

== Capacity ==
- Original capacity: 1 million m^{3}
- Reservoir area: 36 ha

== Irrigation ==
- Designed irrigated area: 40 ha
- Actual irrigated area in 2002: 13 ha

== Environment ==
The catchment of the reservoir is 9.4 km^{2} large. The reservoir suffers from rapid siltation. Part of the water that could be used for irrigation is lost through seepage; the positive side-effect is that this contributes to groundwater recharge.

== Homonymous places ==
The town of Addi Shihu, in Alaje woreda is located more than 100 km to the south.
