= Atsbi Wenberta =

District in Tigray Region, Ethiopia

Atsbi Wemberta ኣጽቢ ወምበርታ
- Woreda
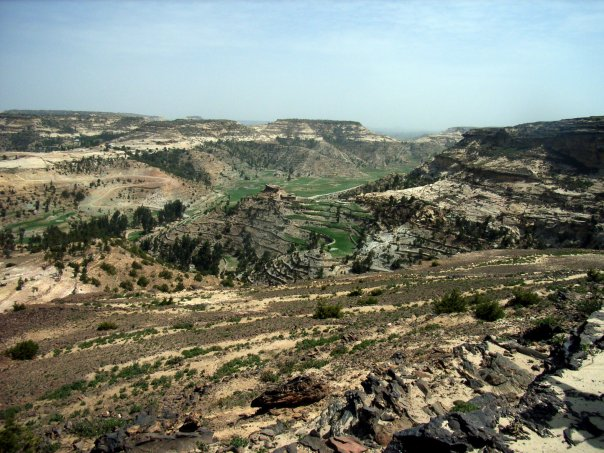

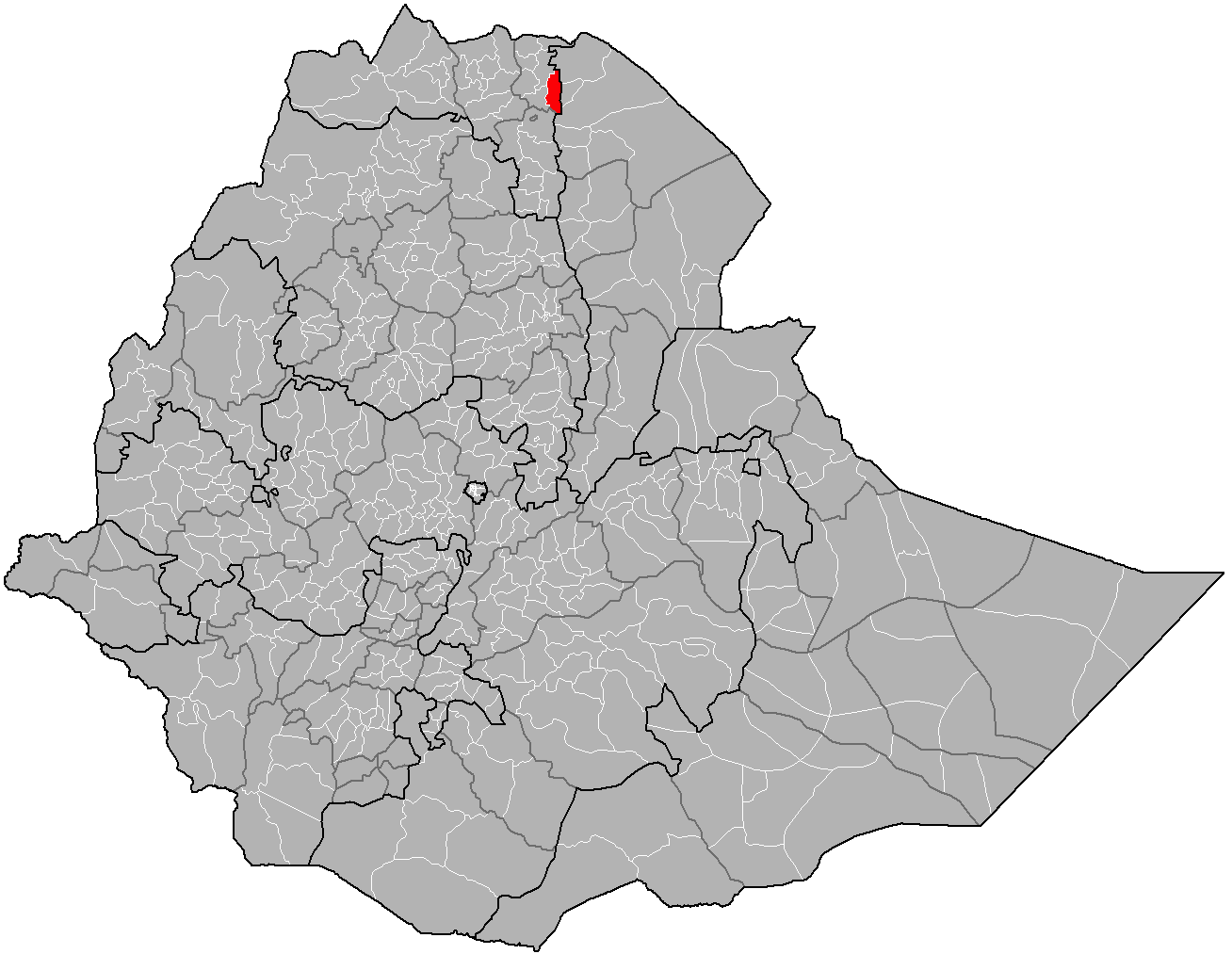
- Country: Ethiopia
- Region: Tigray
- Zone: Misraqawi (Eastern)

Area
  - Total: 1,758.11 km^{2} (678.81 sq mi)

Population (2007)
  - Total: 112,341

Atsbi Wemberta (Tigrinya: ኣጽቢ ወምበርታ) is one of woredas in the Tigray Region of Ethiopia. Located in the Misraqawi Zone at the eastern edge of the Ethiopian Highlands, Atsbi Wenberta is bordered on the south by the Debub Misraqawi (Southeastern) Zone, on the west by Kilte Awulaelo, on the north by Saesi Tsaedaemba, and on the east by the Afar Region. The administrative center of this woreda is Atsbi (officially Atsbi Endaselassie Tigrigna: ኣጽቢ እንዳስላሴ); other towns in Atsbi Wenberta include Haiqi Mesahil, Atsbi Dar'a, Kelisha Emni and Habes. The woreda is administratively divided into 18 tabiyas (municipalities).

== Overview ==
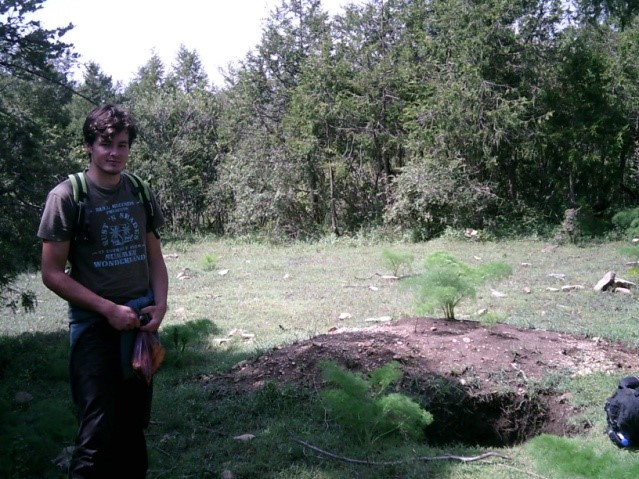
Des'a forest is dominated by Juniperus procera

The elevation of this woreda varies from 918 to 3069 meters above sea level. Rivers in Atsi Wenberta are seasonal and flow only during the rainy season. There is no lake but there are small streams and ponds. The soil is seriously degraded, and there is hardly any forest or woodland, with the notable exception of north Tigray's largest forest on the Rift Valley shoulder and on the escarpment towards the Danakil depression: the Des'a forest. Irrigation is used in the few places where it is possible; the suitable sites are rare. On many slopes the soil is so highly eroded that even when rain falls, it can retain only a small amount of moisture. Nine of the 16 peasant associations in Atsbi Wenberta have an elevation of 2600 meters or higher, and are planted in barley, wheat, pulses like faba beans, and small ruminants like sheep are raised. The other seven peasant associations have an elevation below 2600 meters and are planted in teff, wheat, and barley, and both livestock and apiculture are cultivated; 6729 bee colonies are reported in this woreda. A major cash crop are faba beans, and Atsi Wenbarta is an important supplier of sheep and goats for meat to the nearby towns of Wukro, Adigrat, and the city of Mekelle.

== History ==
Atsbi Wemberta was composed of four sub-provinces mainly Dera, Atsbi, Dessia and Wemberta. There are Axumite and pre-Aksumite sites which return the Wereda's history back to antiquity. Habes, Era, Safir, Zerema, Keteba and Sekera were major archaeological sites of the Wereda. During the Aksumite civilization, several rock churches were built. Among them, the major architecturally fine churches are Mikael Debreselam, Mikael Amba, Zerema Georgis, Cherkos Agewo and Mikael Bark. There are also other dozens of ancient churches. In the dawn of the 19th century, the town of Atsbi Endaselasie was established as a result of the church's foundation by Dejazimach Subagdis. Elders narrate that two Rases and 17 dejazmaches ruled Atsbi from the reign of Subagadis to the coming of Derg.

Historically, the district of Wemberta has been an integral part of Enderta province, when Enderta was an independent province as well as an awrajja as recent as the late 1990s.

Wemberta was occupied by the Ethiopian People's Revolutionary Party (EPRP) in 1978. Local shifta (or brigands) are said to have joined the EPRP and robbed woreda inhabitants, using the political organization as a cover. They killed at least one man known as Hagos Tesfu. However, when the EPRP left, the shifta remained in the area. The Derg then organized the local people against these shifta, which resulted with one killed, one fleeing to the Afar Depression, and four being executed. In 1980, the Tigrayan People's Liberation Front took control of the area, which resulted in numerous military campaigns by the Derg; woreda inhabitants were arrested or killed by the military, their livestock were killed and married women raped.

Atsbi Wenberta was one of nine woredas in Tigray most affected by a drought during 2008, requiring emergency food supplies requested for an estimated 600,000 people.

In 2020, woreda Atsbi Wenberta became inoperative and its territory belongs to the following new woredas:

- Atsbi (new, smaller, woreda)
- Agula'i woreda (part of it)
- Sa'isi woreda
- Atsbi town

== Culture ==
The culture and cuisine of the woreda is heavily influenced by Enderta, Agame and Raya of the Tigrayans, and the Afars whereby it's the interface of the four local cultures. But, such culture is now declining because of youth migration and influence of other culture.

=== Dance ===
There are a number of unique dancing styles available within the wereda like Gumaye, Tegomtsets, and Tilhit, among others.

Hura Seleste (where "seleste" means "three"), a type of dance with multiple steps, has gained popularity in the neighboring woredas of the Tigray and Afar regions. They are played especially during Christmas. Dancers pay due attention to the steps hura hade (one), hura kilte (two), and hura arbaete (four).

=== Food ===
Tihilo ጥሕሎ "ጥሕሎ ንልቢ የጥልሎ" , Gogo ወይ ሕምባሻ, Kitcha bMear, Siwa (beer) ዱቃ, and Mies ሜስየ ሜስየ ናይ ወልዱ እያ ናይ ሱባጋድስየ (Tej Honey-wine) are the popular foods and drinks. The traditional dance of Hura-Seleste is colorful especially during the Ethiopian Christmas.

=== Clothes ===
Youths of Atsbi Wenberta make a special type of thin, decorated, evenly-roasted stick called the Birbir.

== Demographics ==
Based on the 2007 national census conducted by the Central Statistical Agency of Ethiopia (CSA), this woreda has a total population of 112,341, an increase of 85,561 over the 1994 census, of whom 53,659 are men and 58,682 women; 11,144 or 9.92% are urban inhabitants. With an area of 1,758.11 square kilometers, Atsbi Wonberta has a population density of 63.90, which is greater than the Zone average of 56.93 persons per square kilometer. A total of 26,425 households were counted in this woreda, resulting in an average of 4.25 persons to a household, and 25,533 housing units. The majority of the inhabitants said they practiced Ethiopian Orthodox Christianity, with 97.79% reporting that as their religion, while 2.12% of the population were Muslim.

The 1994 national census reported a total population for this woreda of 93,659 of whom 45,521 were men and 48,138 were women; 32,229 or 34.41% of its population were urban dwellers. The ethnic group reported in Atsbi Wenberta were the Tigrayan (98.43%); all other ethnic groups made up 1.66% of the population. Tigrinya is spoken as a first language by 97.1%, 2.1% Amharic, and 0.6% speak Oromiffa; the remaining 0.2% spoke all other primary languages reported. 78.35% of the population said they were Ethiopian Christians, and 21.45% were Muslim. Concerning education, 14.76% of the population were considered literate, which is greater than the Zone average of 9.01%; 20.65% of children aged 7–12 were in primary school, which is more than the Zone average of 11.34%; 3.09% of the children aged 13–14 were in junior secondary school, which is more than the Zone average of 0.65%; 3.38 of the inhabitants aged 15–18 were in senior secondary school. Concerning sanitary conditions, 91% of the urban houses and 43% of all houses had access to safe drinking water at the time of the census; about 12% of the urban and 31% of the total had toilet facilities.

== Economy ==
There are several local monolithic churches in this woreda, which include Mikael Barka, and Mikael Imba. There are also several churches which were originally built in Aksumite times; these include Mikael Debre Selam and Zarema Giyorgis located northwest of Atsbi. Other heritage rich churches and monasteries like Selassie Atsbi, Asira Metira and Mariam Dibo are available. Though the wereda is rich in tourism potential, the destination is not well developed. Tour guides come from Wukro. One micro-finance institution operates in Atsbi Wenberta, the Dedebit Credit and Saving Institution SC, with two sub-branches in Atsbi which report to the office in Wukro. There are 16 multipurpose cooperatives in this woreda, one for each kebele. However, these cooperatives have faced a number of problems, which include a failure to compete successfully with local private traders and the discovery after a 2004 audit of all of the cooperatives that 47,000 Birr was missing.

=== Agriculture ===
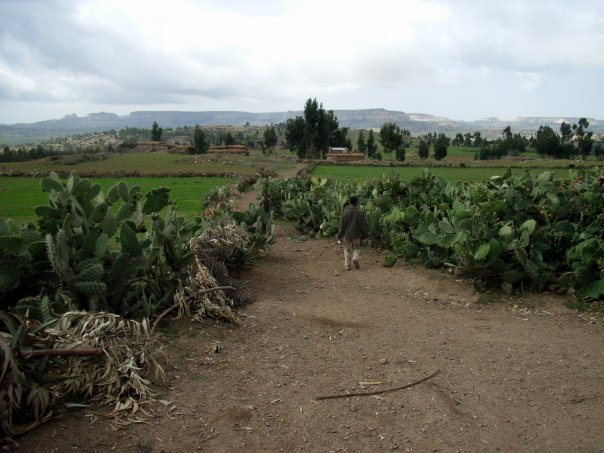
Farmland and cart track bordered with hedges consisting of Beles (Tigrinya), Cactus Pear (English) or Opuntia ficus-indica (Scientific)

A sample enumeration performed by the CSA in 2001 interviewed 21,729 farmers in this woreda, who held an average of 0.46 hectares of land. Of the 10,040 hectares of private land surveyed, 84.53% was under cultivation, 4.15% pasture, 3.95% fallow, 1.24% in woodland, and 6.11% was devoted to other uses. For the land under cultivation in this woreda, 69% was planted in cereals, 12.9% in pulses, 0.64% in oilseeds, and 2 hectares in vegetables. The total area planted in fruit trees was 186 hectares, while 1 hectare was planted in gesho. 74.65% of the farmers both raised crops and livestock, while 19.36% only grew crops and 5.99% only raised livestock. Land tenure in this woreda is distributed amongst 93.18% owning their land, 5.56% renting, and 1.28% holding their land under other forms of tenure.

=== Reservoirs ===
In this district with rains that last only for a couple of months per year, reservoirs of different sizes allow harvesting runoff from the rainy season for further use in the dry season. The reservoirs of the district include

- Addi Shihu,
- Era, and
- Felaga.

Overall, these reservoirs suffer from rapid siltation. Part of the water that could be used for irrigation is lost through seepage; the positive side-effect is that this contributes to groundwater recharge.
