= Phaeozem =

Type of soil

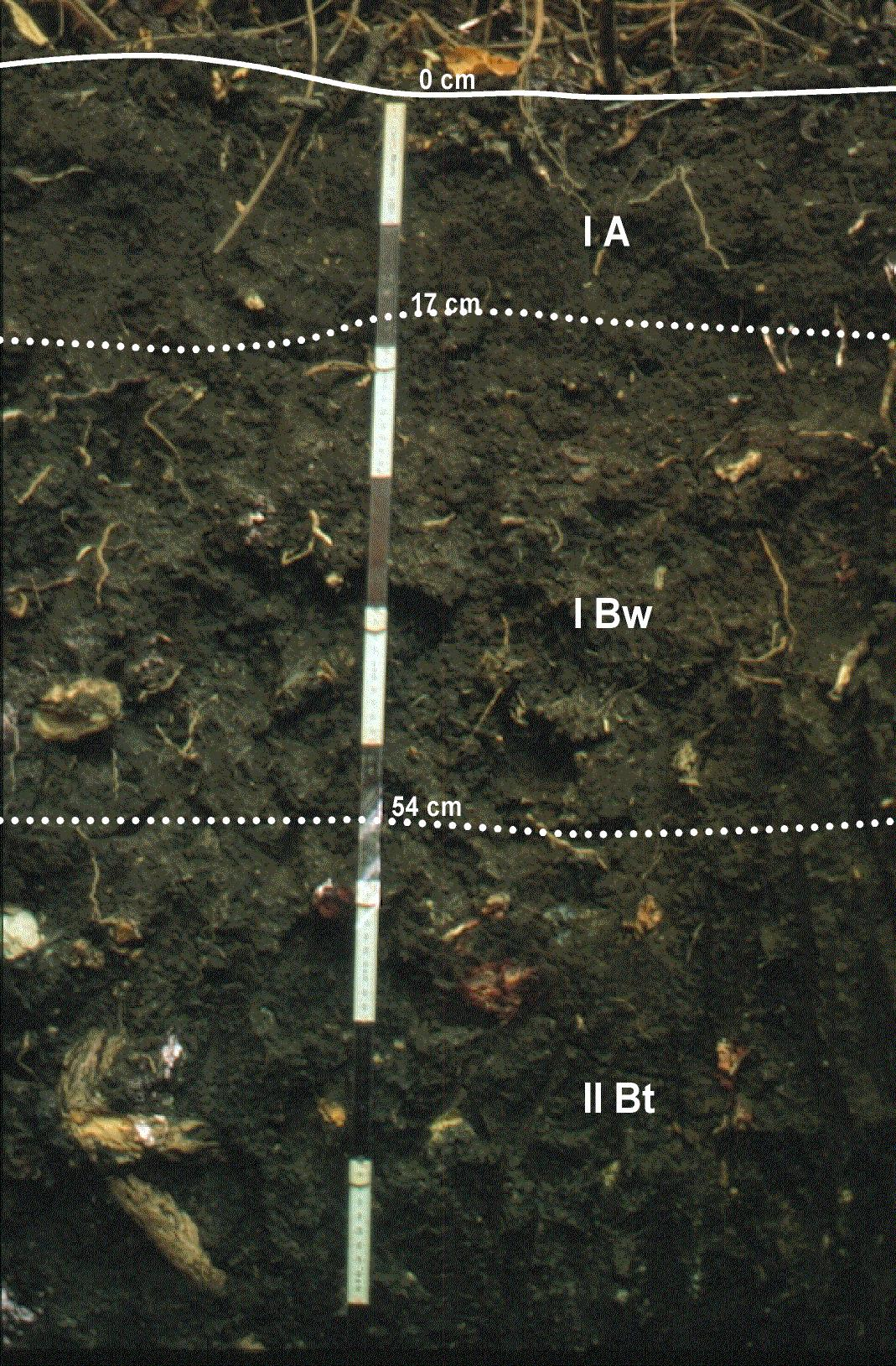
Luvic Phaeozem in Luqmuts, Ethiopia

Distribution of Phaenozem soils as defined by the World Reference Base for Soil Resources classification: Dominant (more than 50% of soil cover) Codominant (25-50%) Associated (5-25%)

A Phaeozem in the World Reference Base for Soil Resources (WRB) is a dark soil with a high base status, but without a secondary carbonates within one metre of the soil surface. Most Phaeozems correlate with the Udolls (Mollisols) of the USDA soil taxonomy.

These soils are found mainly in humid and sub-humid tall-grass steppes; there are extensive areas of them in the United States, Argentina and China. Phaeozems form from unconsolidated sediments such as loess and glacial till and typically have organic matter contents of about 5% and a pH of 5–7.

Intensive agricultural use is widespread and includes wheat, soybean and cotton production and improved pastures for cattle.

== See also ==
- Pedogenesis
- Pedology
- Soil classification
