= Atsbi =

Atsbi ኣጽቢ
- Town
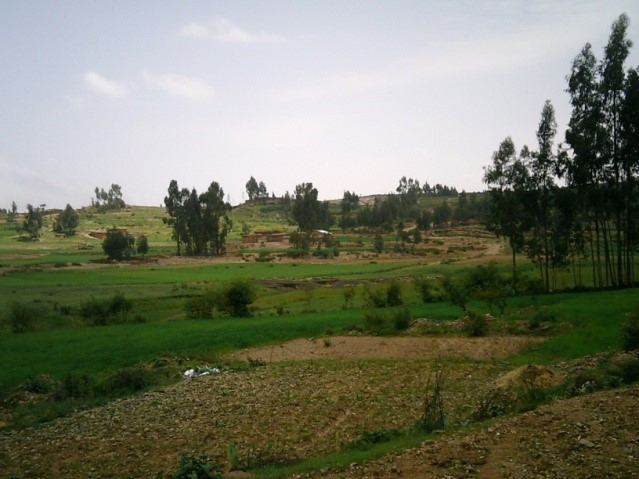

- Location within Ethiopia
- Coordinates: 13°52′N 39°44′E
- Country: Ethiopia
- Region: Tigray
- Zone: Misraqawi (Eastern)
- Woreda: Atsbi Wenberta
- Elevation: 2,630 m (8,630 ft)

Population (2005)
  - Total: 5,857
- Time zone: UTC+03:00 (EAT)

Atsbi (Ge'ez: ኣጽቢ) (officially known as Atsbi Endaselase Ge'ez: ኣጽቢ እንዳስላሴ ) is a town in Tigray, Ethiopia. Located in the Misraqawi (Eastern) Zone of the Tigray Region, about 50 kilometers northeast of Qwiha, this town has a latitude and longitude of 13°52′N 39°44′E with an elevation of 2630 meters above sea level. It is the administrative center of Atsbi Wenberta woreda.

== History ==
Mordechai Abir notes that, along with Ficho, Atsbi was an important center of trade in the blocks of salt called amoleh, which was used as late as the 20th century as currency. Both settlements lay on the borders of the former provinces of Agame and Enderta at the edge of the Ethiopian Highlands. Here caravans brought thousands of amolahs from the salt deposits in the Afar Depression, which were then sold to traders for about 100 to one Maria Theresa Thaler; these merchants then transported the blocks west to Adwa, Axum and Gondar, and south to Gojjam and beyond as far as Ennarea and the Kingdom of Kaffa where they sold them at a profit.

The Italians occupied Atsbi on 12 November 1935, after clashing with the troops of Dejazmach Kassa Sebhat.

In 1938, there was a health post and a telephone office.

The Italian army left the town in 1941.

The refugee camp at Atsbi, along with the one at Korem, were shown on BBC television on 23 and 24 October 1984 as an example of the devastation of the 1983–85 famine.

== Demographics ==
In 1938, the town counted approximately 2000 inhabitants.

Based on figures from the Central Statistical Agency in 2005, Atsbi had an estimated total population of 5,857 of whom 2,663 are men and 3,194 are women. The 1994 census reported it had a total population of 3,381 of whom 1,418 were men and 1,963 were women.

== Geology and soils ==
The following geological formations are present in this locality:

- Enticho Sandstone
- Precambrian metamorphic rocks

The main geomorphic units, with corresponding soil types are:

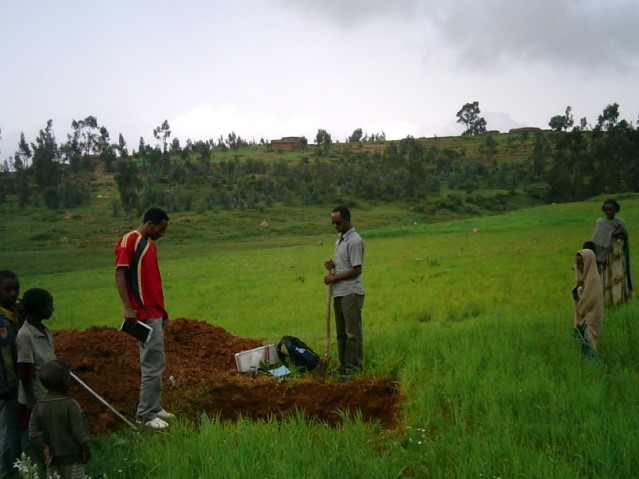
Haplic Cambisol in Atsbi

- Undulating plain (west of Atsbi)
  - Associated soil types
    - complex of rock outcrops, very stony and very shallow soils ((Lithic) Leptosol)
    - shallow, very stony, silt loamy to loamy soils (Skeletic Cambisol, Leptic Cambisol, Skeletic Regosol)
    - shallow to moderately deep silt loamy to loamy soils (Haplic Cambisol)
  - Inclusions
    - Brown, silty loams to loamy sands developed on alluvium, with good natural fertility (Mollic) Fluvisol, Fluvic Cambisol
    - clays of floodplains with very high watertable with moderate to good natural fertility (Eutric Gleysol, Gleyic Cambisol)
- Rolling landscape on Precambrian rocks – east of the town
  - Dominant soil type: complex of rock outcrops, very stony and very shallow soils ((Lithic) Leptosol)
  - Associated soil types
    - shallow, very stony, silt loamy to loamy soils (Skeletic Cambisol, Leptic Cambisol, Skeletic Regosol)
    - clays of floodplains with very high watertable with moderate to good natural fertility (Eutric Gleysol, Gleyic Cambisol)
  - Inclusion: moderately deep, red-brownish, loamy soils with a good natural fertility (Chromic Luvisol)
- Mesas in Enticho Sandstone – south of the town
  - Associated soil types
    - complex of rock outcrops, very stony and very shallow soils ((Lithic) Leptosol)
    - shallow, very stony, silt loamy to loamy soils (Skeletic Cambisol, Leptic Cambisol, Skeletic Regosol)
  - Inclusions
    - Shallow, dark loamy soils with a good natural fertility (Rendzic and Leptic Phaeozem
    - shallow, stony loam soils (Eutric Regosol and Cambisol)
- Colluvium of Enticho Sandstone – surrounding the previous geomorphic unit
  - Dominant soil type: sandy clay loams to sands developed on sandy colluvium (Eutric Arenosol, Regosol, Cambisol)
  - Associated soil type: shallow, very stony, silt loamy to loamy soils (Skeletic Cambisol, Leptic Cambisol, Skeletic Regosol)
  - Inclusion: brown, silty loams to loamy sands developed on alluvium, with good natural fertility ((Mollic) Fluvisol, Fluvic Cambisol)
