= Edaga Arbi Glacials =

Palaeozoic geological formation in Africa

- Stratigraphic range: Late Carboniferous
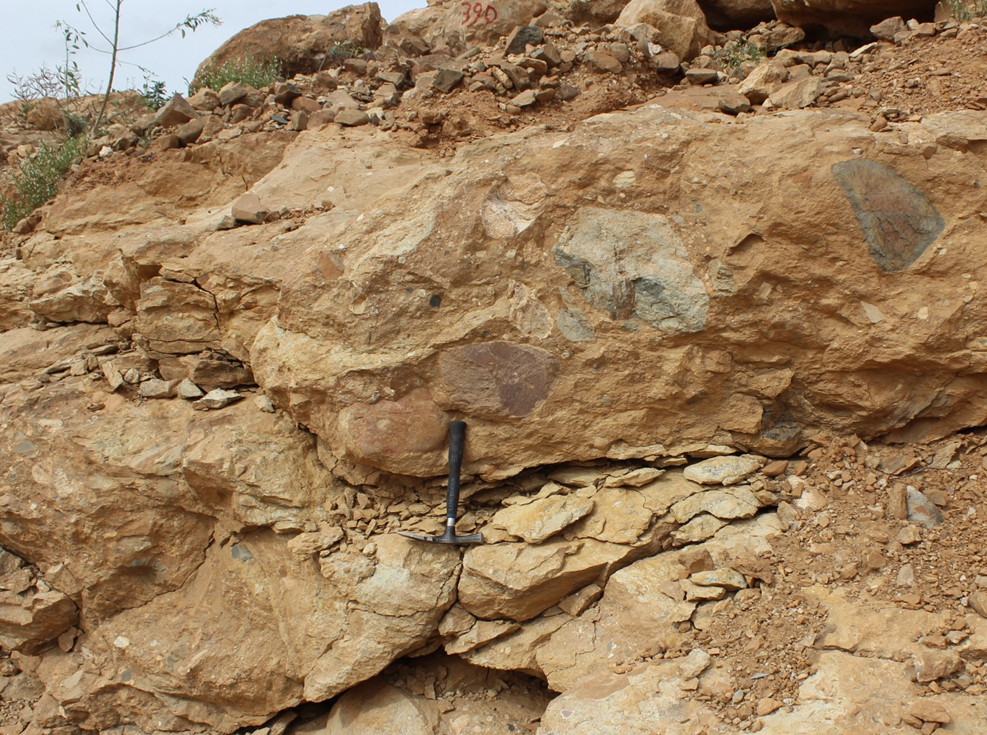
- Roadcut between Werqamba and Hawzien, northeast of Dogu’a Tembien
- Type: Geological formation
- Underlies: Adigrat Sandstone, coeval with Enticho Sandstone
- Overlies: Precambrian basement
- Thickness: 200 m (660 ft)

Lithology
- Primary: Tillite, Mudstone
- Other: Dropstones, Sandstone

Location
- Coordinates: 14.2037°N 39.255°E
- Approximate paleocoordinates: 0°N 0°E
- Region: Tigray
- Country: Ethiopia, Eritrea
- Extent: central-south Eritrea, northeast Tigray

Type section
- Named for: Town of Idaga Arbi
- Named by: D.B. Dow
- Edaga Arbi Glacials (Ethiopia)

The Edaga Arbi Glacials are a Palaeozoic geological formation in Tigray (northern Ethiopia) and in Eritrea. The matrix is composed of grey, black and purple clays (locally silt), that contains rock fragments up to 6 metres across. Pollen dating yields a Late Carboniferous (~323 million years or Ma) to Early Permian (~295 Ma) age.

== Name and definition ==
The name was coined by geologist D.B.Dow and colleagues They referred to the wide outcrops surrounding the town of Idaga Arbi. So far the nomenclature has not been proposed for recognition to the International Commission on Stratigraphy.

== Stratigraphic context ==
The Edaga Arbi Glacials fill the bottom of north-south oriented valleys, that were carved by glaciers, into the Precambrian basement and in Early Palaeozoic sediments. These valleys were often several kilometres wide and tens of meters deep. Indeed, northern Ethiopia was glaciated in the Early Palaeozoic (Late Ordovician; ~445 Ma), and in the Late Palaeozoic (Carboniferous-Permian; ~300 Ma). This has led to the presence of glacial sediments as well as erosional landforms in eastern Tigray. Over the last 30 million years the Ethiopian Highlands have been uplifted and the Edaga Arbi Glacials have been exposed as a result of the erosion of overlying rocks. This is one of the few places in the world where the Palaeozoic glacial deposits are well exposed and can be easily accessed.

== Environment ==
These glaciogenic sediments were deposited directly by the glacier as moraines. They have been consolidated, what allows to name them as tillites. As usual, these moraines and tillites are composed of large rock fragments in a fine earth mass. Mudstones are predominant. Often, they hold dropstones, what indicates that the sediment was often deposited in fjords or pro-glacial lakes. The tillites have often been deformed by (underwater) slumping.

== Lithology ==
The Edaga Arbi Glacials may reach a thickness of 200 metres. Similar to most other tillites, they hold many different types of sediment. Generally, the sediments are rich in mud (clay and silt), in contrast to the Enticho Sandstone fluvioglacial deposits. Basal till that was deposited directly under the ice holds many rock fragments. In other places, the settling in water of suspended fine-grained sediment resulted in massive stratified mudstones. Still elsewhere, the underwater movement of sand by gravity resulted in sandstone lenses. As they were formed under water, the mudstone and the sandstone contain (sometimes very large) dropstones, deposited from melting ice rafts.

== Life ==
Pollen and spores have been found in the Edaga Arbi Glacials. Their age confirms that the Edaga Arbi Glacials date back to the Late Palaeozoic ice age.

== Geographical extent ==
The deposits are exposed locally as south as Samre and Abergelle, and then further north at the margins of the Dogu’a Tembien massif. They are widespread around Idaga Arbi and further north into Eritrea.

== Exposed glacial geomorphology ==
The glacial erosion in northern Ethiopia reshaped the topography. Later on this topography was covered by more recent sediments. In places where these sediments were again eroded, the ancient landforms have become visible. They are sometimes millimeters and sometimes kilometres wide. These ancient landforms are mainly visible on the exposed older Precambrian basement bedrock surface. For instance, the larger valleys correspond to the path that the glaciers followed. More in detail, the polished bedrock surfaces display striations and other small depressions and fractures. The fine particles within glaciers polished the bedrock, while striations are scratch-marks created when larger rock fragments were dragged over the pre-existing rock surface by glaciers. The shape of the striations evidences that the ice flow direction was towards the north. Glacial grooves within the Edaga Arbi Glacials were probably created by flowing meltwater under glaciers.
