= Enticho Sandstone =

Geological formation in Ethiopia

- Stratigraphic range: Late Ordovician; ~460–444 Ma
- Northwest of Sinkata
- Type: Geological formation
- Underlies: Adigrat Sandstone, coeval with Edaga Arbi Glacials
- Overlies: Precambrian basement rocks
- Thickness: 200 m (660 ft)

Lithology
- Primary: Glaciogenic Sandstone, Mudstone
- Other: Dropstones

Location
- Coordinates: 14.2854°N 39.1561°E
- Approximate paleocoordinates: 0°N 0°E
- Region: Tigray
- Country: Ethiopia, Eritrea
- Extent: central-south Eritrea, northeast Tigray

Type section
- Named for: Town of Inticho
- Named by: D.B. Dow and colleagues
- Enticho Sandstone (Ethiopia)

The Enticho Sandstone is a geological formation in north Ethiopia. It forms the lowermost sedimentary rock formation in the region and lies directly on the basement rocks. Enticho Sandstone consists of arenite that is rich in quartz. The formation has a maximum thickness of 200 metres. Locally, its upper part is coeval with the Edaga Arbi Glacials. The Enticho Sandstone has been deposited during the Ordovician (485–443 million years), as evidenced by impressions of organisms.

== Description ==
=== Name and definition ===
The name was coined by geologists D.B. Dow and colleagues. So far the nomenclature has not been proposed for recognition to the International Commission on Stratigraphy.

=== Geographical extent ===
Enticho Sandstone outcrops in central-southern Eritrea and in northeast Tigray in Ethiopia.

Cliffs of Enticho Sandstone between Negash and Sinkata. The four rock churches of the Sinkata cluster are located in this cliff.

=== Stratigraphic context ===
Northern Ethiopia has experienced glaciations during the Early Palaeozoic (Late Ordovician; circa 445 million years ago), as well as in the Late Palaeozoic (Carboniferous-Permian; circa 300 million years ago). At that time, the area was located at the position of the South Pole. It is difficult to differentiate between the sediments of these two Palaeozoic glaciations as they occur side by side in some places; elsewhere, however, sediments from the younger glaciation rest directly on those from the older glaciation. As a consequence, all Palaeozoic glaciogenic sediments of north Ethiopia have for a long time been interpreted as two sediment types from a single glacial period: (i) mudstone-rich tillite (Edaga Arbi Glacials), and (ii) sandstone-dominated deposits (Enticho Sandstone). More recently, it was demonstrated that most of the Enticho Sandstone was deposited in the Early Palaeozoic glaciation and in the Silurian period (circa 430 million years ago).

=== Depositional environment ===
The Enticho Sandstone evidences Early Paleozoic glaciations. It was deposited in the shallow seas surrounding northern Gondwana's ice shield. Over the last 30 million years the Ethiopian Highlands have been uplifted and the Enticho Sandstone has been exposed as a result of the erosion of overlying rocks. This is one of the few places in the world where the Palaeozoic glacial and fluvio-glacial deposits are well exposed and can be easily accessed.

== Lithology ==
The Enticho Sandstone is a secondary glaciogenic deposit that has been reworked by meltwater of the icecap. It comprises meltwater-transported gravel and sand, as well as thinly bedded mudstone, deposited on the sea floor or in pro-glacial lakes. Dropstones are present; the mud matrix holds larger and smaller clasts that were dropped from melting ice rafts. Three units compose the Enticho Sandstone, from bottom to top: (1) a 30-60 metres thick glaciogenic unit, (2) locally a mudstone-dominated unit that is maximum 20 metres thick, and (3) 20-150 metres thick sandstone.

== Fossil content ==
The Enticho Sandstone holds fossil traces of animals and primitive plant spores; they evidence a marine environment resulting from rising sea levels in relation to melting ice.

== Economic geology ==
=== Rock churches in Enticho Sandstone ===
A large part of the rock-hewn churches of the Atsbi and Sinkata-Adigrat clusters have been carved in Enticho Sandstone. Most of these churches hewn in the 14th and 15th centuries, while some have been dated to the 10th-13th centuries. Most of these mediaeval churches are still in use as Christian orthodox village churches. Sandstone was the preferred rock type for rock-hewn churches. The carvers must have appreciated several properties of the rock: hardness and spacing of bedding planes and joints (natural planar cracks).
