= Cambisol =

Type of soil

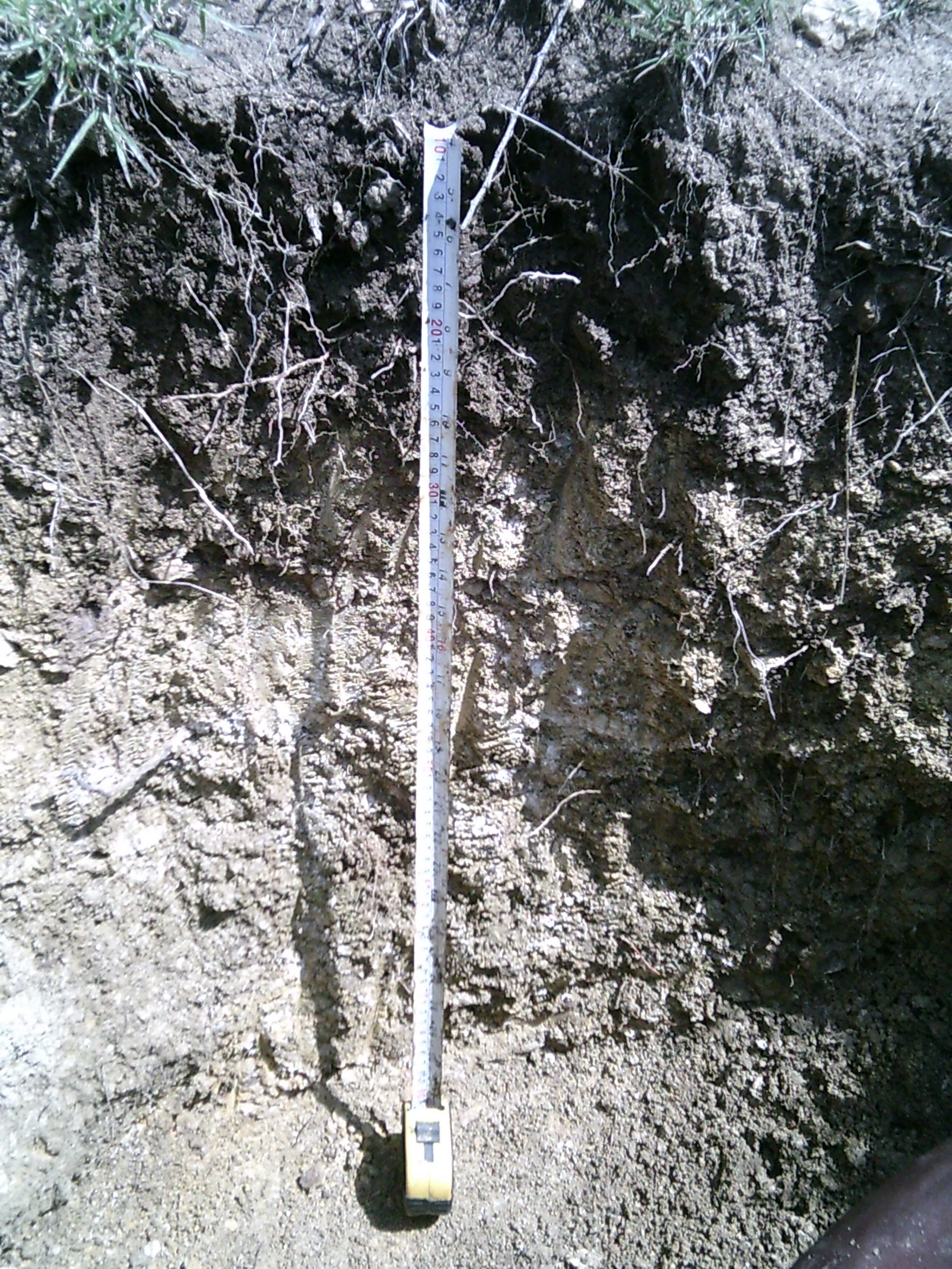
Calcaric Cambisol (Humic) profile in Des'a forest in Ethiopia

A Cambisol in the World Reference Base for Soil Resources (WRB) is a soil in the beginning of soil formation. The horizon differentiation is weak. This is evident from weak, mostly brownish discolouration and/or structure formation in the soil profile.

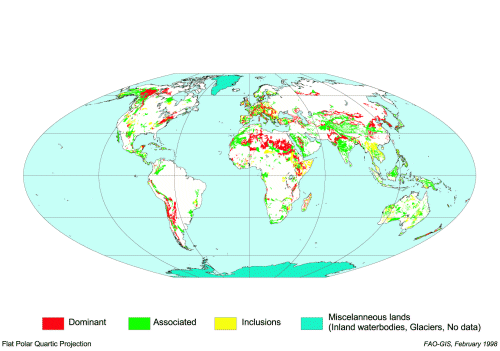
Distribution of Cambisols

Cambisols are developed in medium and fine-textured materials derived from a wide range of rocks, mostly in alluvial, colluvial and aeolian deposits.

Most of these soils make good agricultural land and are intensively used. Cambisols in temperate climates are among the most productive soils on earth.

Cambisols cover an estimated 15 million square kilometres worldwide. They are well represented in temperate and boreal regions that were under the influence of glaciation during the Pleistocene, partly because the soil's parent material is still young, but also because soil formation is comparatively slow in the cool, northern regions. Cambisols are less common in the tropics and subtropics, but they are common in areas with active erosion where they may occur in association with mature tropical soils.

== See also ==
- Pedogenesis
- Pedology (soil study)
- Soil classification
