= Werie Lehe =

Werie Leke ወርዒ ለኸ Weri'i Lehi
- Woreda
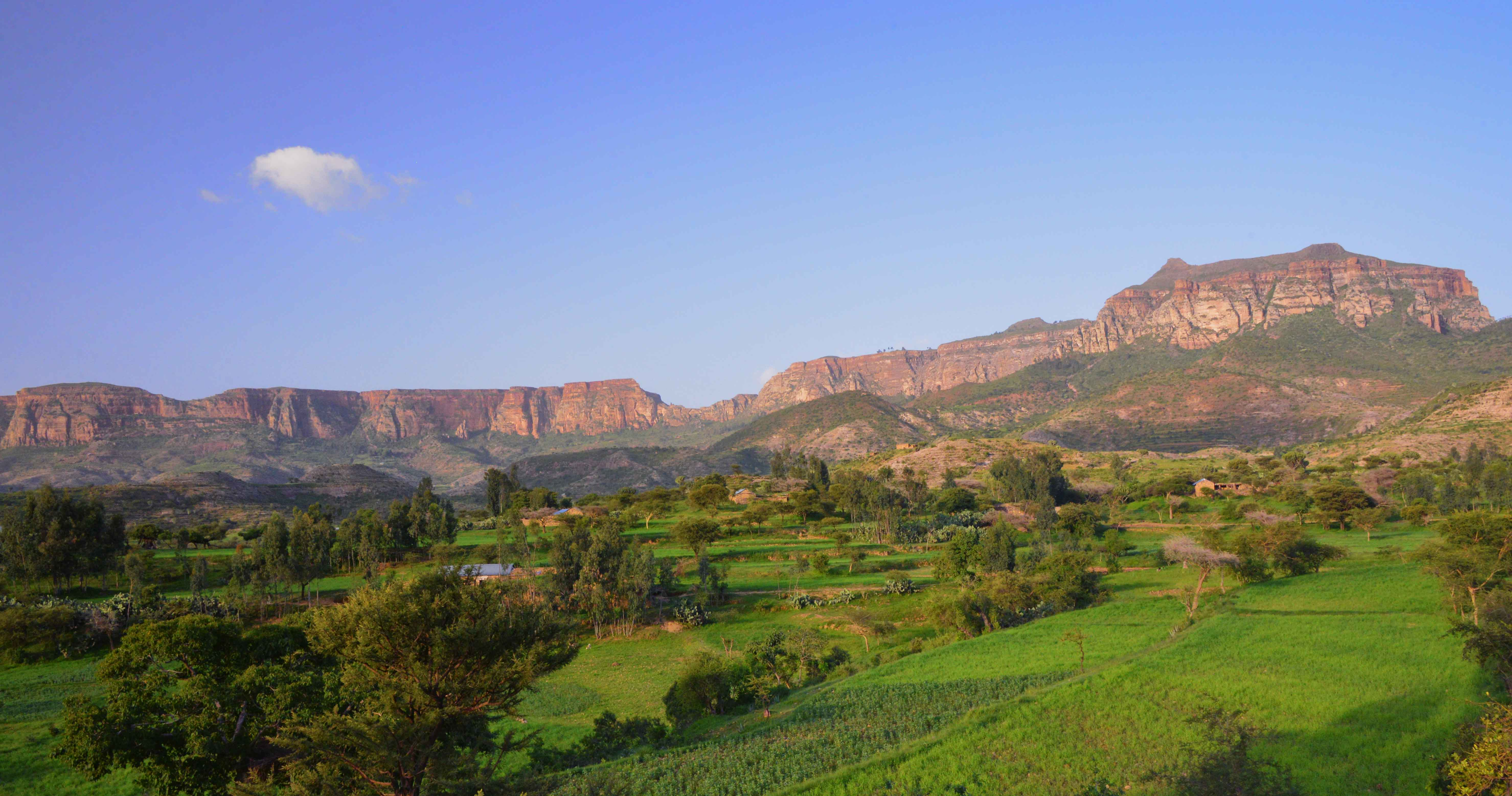

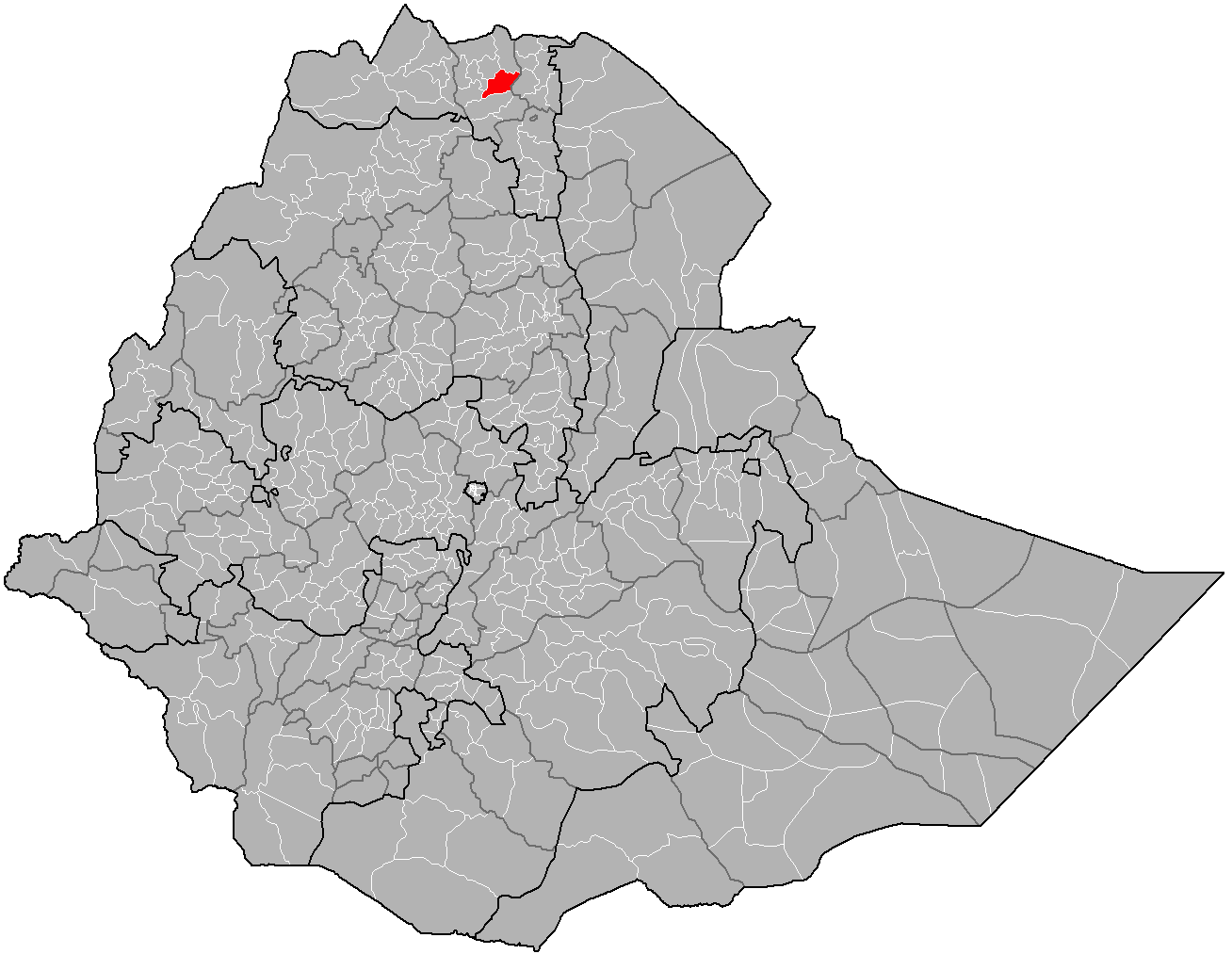
- Country: Ethiopia
- Region: Tigray
- Zone: Maekelay Zone (Central)

Area
  - Total: 2,360.17 km^{2} (911.27 sq mi)

Population (2007)
  - Total: 146,104

Werie Lehe (Tigrinya: ወርዒ ለኸ) was one of the woredas in the Tigray Region of Ethiopia. Part of the Maekelay Zone, Werie Lehe was bordered on the south by the Wari River which separated it from Kola Tembien, on the southwest by Naeder Adet, on the west by La'ilay Maychew, on the north by Adwa, on the northeast by Enticho, and on the east by the Misraqawi (Eastern) Zone.

Local landmarks in this woreda include several monolithic churches, which include Wkro Mariyam, Wkro Giyorgis and Abba Ghenzay near Nebelet. Another site of archeological interest is Henzat Gabriel, 52 kilometers southeast of Adwa, where local traditions claim around 160 stelae from Aksumite times are buried in and around the compound of the local church.

== History ==
The area around Nebelet is historically called Imba Seneyti. In 2020 this woreda was divided into three new woredas: Indafelasi (administrative centre: Maykinetal), Weri'i (Edaga Arbi) and Imba Seneyti (Nebelet).

== Demographics ==
Based on the 2007 national census conducted by the Central Statistical Agency of Ethiopia (CSA), this woreda has a total population of 146,104, an increase of 32.06% over the 1994 census, of whom 71,659 are men and 74,445 women; 16,525 or 11.31% are urban inhabitants. With an area of 2,360.17 square kilometers, Werie Lehe has a population density of 61.90, which is greater than the Zone average of 56.29 persons per square kilometer. A total of 32,591 households were counted in this woreda, resulting in an average of 4.48 persons to a household, and 31,090 housing units. The majority of the inhabitants said they practiced Ethiopian Orthodox Christianity, with 98.59% reporting that as their religion, while 1.4% of the population were Muslim.

The 1994 national census reported a total population for this woreda of 110,636, of whom 54,207 were men and 56,429 were women; 4,538 or 4.1% of its population were urban dwellers. The largest ethnic group reported in Werie Lehe was the Tigrayan (99.9%). Tigrinya was spoken as a first language by 99.93%. 98.49% of the population practiced Ethiopian Orthodox Christianity, and 1.44% were Muslim. Concerning education, 15.14% of the population were considered literate, which is more than the Zone average of 14.21%; 14.97% of children aged 7–12 were in primary school; 0.1% of the children aged 13–14 were in junior secondary school, and 0.12% of the inhabitants aged 15–18 were in senior secondary school. Concerning sanitary conditions, about 83% of the urban houses and 13% of all houses had access to safe drinking water at the time of the census; about 2% of the urban and 2% of the total had toilet facilities.

== Agriculture ==
A sample enumeration performed by the CSA in 2001 interviewed 27,199 farmers in this woreda, who held an average of 1.09 hectares of land. Of the 29,738 hectares of private land surveyed, 82.1% was in cultivation, 0.85% pasture, 13.84% fallow, 0.22% woodland, and 2.97% was devoted to other uses. For the land under cultivation in this woreda, 73.22% was planted in cereals, 7.2% in pulses, 1.16% in oilseeds, and 0.09% in vegetables. The area planted in fruit trees was 38 hectares; the area planted in gesho is missing. 79.85% of the farmers both raised crops and livestock, while 18.6% only grew crops and 1.55% only raised livestock. Land tenure in this woreda is distributed amongst 83.24% owning their land, 12.24% renting, and 4.52% in other forms of tenure.

The Ethiopian News Agency announced 31 July 2009 that for the year farmers in the woreda harvested 113,044 quintals of various vegetables and fruits grown on 1,685 hectares of land, a 30% increase over the previous year.
