= Timeline of the 2026 Ethiopian offensive =

This timeline of the 2026 Ethiopian offensive covers events of the conflict—including hostilities, various aspects of its humanitarian crisis, and diplomatic developments—since it began on 22 September 2026 until the present day.

== 2026 ==
=== 22 September ===
- On 22 September, Ethiopia launched at least five drones and carried out more than 21 airstrikes; two of the drone strikes hit two schools in Alamata, and left at least 14 civilians dead and injured 22 others.
- After the strikes, the TPLF accused the government of launching an "open invasion" and declared the start of a "defensive war" in response.

=== 23 September ===
- On the morning of 23 September, the TDF launched an offensive and seized the airports of Axum, Shire, and the Alula Aba Nega Airport in Mekelle in Tigray, causing Ethiopian Airlines to cancel all flights to the region. The TDF also launched offensives on government positions in the nearby regions of Afar and Amhara, including Zata, Dinqa, and Soqota on the Tigray–Amhara border, and Taunsa near the Tigray–Afar border.
- Fighting broke out along the Kobo–Tumuga front between ENDF and a joint force of the TDF and the AFNM.
- The regional government of Afar said that Afari forces would defend themselves from the TDF-led invasion. In neighboring Amhara, government forces were launching strikes using heavy weapons in Lalibela. The firing targeted Fano militants, as they conducted an offensive. According to Washington Examiner, EPFAS alleged that all of its factions carried out attacks in their respective regions, including the OLA.

=== 24 September ===
- Fighting continued along the Tigray–Afar border and in parts of the Amhara region. In Amhara, clashes were reported in Gazgibela woreda in the Wag Hemra Zone, as well as Gidan, Lasta, and Raya Kobo woredas in the North Wollo Zone. The fighting involved the ENDF, the Tigray Peace Force, Amhara Riot Police, and local militias on one side, and the AFNM and TDF on the other. A new front also opened near the Tekezé River in western Tigray.
- Fano forces captured Melese Ashagirea, a Colonel for the Ethiopian Army in Amhara.
- Fighting occurred near Lalibela and the ENDF closed Lalibela airport.
- EPFAS forces moved towards Soqota and were stopped by the ENDF.
- The ENDF and TDF fought near Tselimoy and the ENDF hit the Tselimoy area with airstrikes.

=== 25 September ===
==== Hostilities ====
- Fano insurgents claimed to have captured two ENDF colonels, Meles Ashagrie and deputy commander Edmealem Amare, during fighting in North Wollo, Amhara. According to Fano, the officers and their remaining troops were surrounded while retreating after suffering a defeat. Fano also claimed to have seized 10 Ural military trucks and weapons, including artillery ammunition, while destroying two additional trucks. In Afar, clashes were reported in Yalo, while a drone strike hit Hayelom Tabia, Sheraro, Tigray.
- At the orders of the TPLF, Safaricom and Ethio Telecom cut off access to phone and internet networks in Tigray.

==== Humanitarian crisis ====
- United Nations (UN) Spokesperson Stéphane Dujarric said that the UN was "particularly troubled by reports of the use of drones as well as incidents of harm to civilians," urging parties and belligerents to "exercise maximum restraint and address their differences through dialogue." Dujarric added that UN Secretary-General (UNSG) was closely following developments.
- The UN Office for the Coordination of Humanitarian Affairs (UNOCHA) said hostilities risked exacerbating instability and displaced persons in an area which was experiencing below-average rainfall numbers due to the El Niño–Southern Oscillation (ENSO).
- The UN was alarmed by the restrictions on phone and internet networks as "many rely on banking and mobile transactions due to lack of access to cash and bank ATMs."

==== Diplomatic ====
- The UNSG's Special Envoy for the Horn of Africa, Guang Cong, continued to hold discussions with the African Union (AU) and the regional trade bloc, the Intergovernmental Authority on Development.

=== 26 September ===
- The Gumuz People's Democratic Movement stated that it doesn't have an armed wing and that it is not a member of the Ethiopian Peoples' Forces Coalition for Survival.
- There was fighting in Abala, on the Afar side of the Tigray–Afar border, the during the night from 25–26 September. The ENDF said that it had killed 270 opposition fighters in Amhara.

=== 27 September ===
- The ENDF reportedly recaptured the strategic town of Sekota from Tigrayan forces.
- Fighting continued around Sama, Soqota and Raya Alamata, with government forces reportedly advancing towards Alamata. In the Afar Region, fighting also continued around Abala.
- In Afar, a humanitarian source told Agence France-Presse (AFP) that Erebti had been captured by Tigrayan forces following heavy fighting involving artillery and that the forces were subsequently advancing towards Afdera.
- A drone struck the headquarters of Tigrai TV in Mekelle, damaging the building and forcing the station off air. No casualties were immediately reported.

=== 28 September ===
==== Hostilities ====
- The Tigray Peace Force announced the capture of the city of Alamata, in Southern Tigray. During the clashes in Alamata, at least 52 civilians were killed.

==== Humanitarian crisis ====
- The European Union (EU) announced that it would "provide €61 million EUR in humanitarian funding to help the most vulnerable people in Ethiopia affected by conflict, displacement, disease outbreaks and climate-related hazards, including the impact of ENSO." Citing the EPFAS takeover of airports and ENDF drone strikes, the EU called for "immediate de-escalation, protection of civilians, and unimpeded humanitarian access." The Directorate-General for European Civil Protection and Humanitarian Aid Operations (DG ECHO) stated:
  The EU funding will provide lifesaving and protection assistance to the people most in need. It will support emergency food assistance and nutrition, healthcare, access to water, sanitation and hygiene services, protection, shelter and essential household items, as well as education in emergencies. The funding will also strengthen rapid emergency response to sudden crises as well as anticipatory and disaster preparedness actions. Particular attention will be given to recently displaced people, refugees and affected host communities.

=== 29 September ===
- The governor of the Afar region, Awol Arba, accused the Eritrean Defence Forces (EDF) of infiltrating the region and stated that they were allegedly attempting to cut a road linking Djibouti and Ethiopia. Eritrea did not respond to the immediate accusations. The governor of Afar Region told Al Jazeera that two-thirds of the region is under Eritrean control. The Eritrean opposition group Brigade Nhamedu responded to the reports stating their condemnation in the alleged Eritrean direct involvement in the offensive. Despite these statements, independent mapping and conflict data from Armed Conflict Location and Event Data did not indicate the presence of a large Eritrean offensive, contrasting with the claims.

=== 30 September ===
- About 20 Israeli tourists stranded in Lalibela amid the fighting were evacuated by helicopter to a safe area, following three days of efforts by the Israeli Foreign Ministry and embassy in Addis Ababa. The tourists couldn't leave because flights from the area were suspended due to the fighting.

=== 1 October ===
- In Addis Ababa, explosions were heard after drone strikes were conducted by rebel forces in the region. The Ministry of Foreign Affairs then ordered the closure of the Eritrean embassy in Addis Ababa after accusing them of "direct and indirect hostility", which caused Ethiopia and Eritrea to break ties.
- Pro-government forces regained control of Abala and Erebti towns in the Afar region. The OSINT research group Hamer Intel reported the existence of an "Eritrean incursion" in Northern Afar region, without confirming its size.

=== 2 October ===
- During a BBC interview, an unnamed pro-government militia commander fighting in Tigray stated that there were Eritrean troops fighting in the area alongside the rebels. The Eritrean Minister of Information Yemane Gebremeskel denied the presence of Eritrean troops in Tigray Region.

=== 3 October ===
- According to Reuters, the ENDF recaptured Mekelle's Alula Aba Nega Airport, with the city being encircled by ENDF and pro-government militias. The Ethiopian federal forces entered Mekelle after TPLF militants withdrew and abandoned the city.
- The Ethiopian state-affiliated outlet Horn Review said that the Eritrean army entered Ethiopian territory through the Assab-Bure front to the border Afar towns of Berhale and Dallol, reportedly advancing 20 km (12 mi) into Adigrat.

=== 4 October ===
- A drone strike at an internally displaced persons camp in Sheraro killed eight civilians, including a child, and wounded six others.

=== 5 October ===
- Following the TPLF retreat from Adigrat, forces from the ENDF mobilized along the Eritrean border.

=== 6 October ===
- Eritrean troops entered Adigrat on 6 October according to Ermiyas Ababu, a commander of the pro-government Tigray Peace Force (TPF).

=== 7 October ===
==== Hostilities ====
- Ethiopian government sources and witnesses in Adigrat stated that the EDF had entered Adigrat and several towns near the Ethiopian–Eritrean border. Eritrean Minister of Information, Yemane Gebremeskel, denied that the EDF had entered Ethiopia. He said that claims of the EDF entering Ethiopian territory were a pretext for Ethiopia to invade Eritrea.
- Drone strikes were made against the EDF in Adigrat beginning on 7 October, the town where EDF troops had arrived after having crossed the Ethiopian–Eritrean border.
- According to ACLED, ENDF drone strikes targeted Eritrean forces as they traveled towards Idaga Hamus. The EDF entered Idaga Hamus on 7 October according to the TPF.

==== Humanitarian crisis ====
- According to a report published by the UN-related International Organization for Migration (IOM)—which is providing emergency food, water, and medical care—over 20,000 civilian journeys had been recorded going from Ethiopian through Djibouti towards Yemen, which is also currently entrenched in a civil war. 539 arrived back to Ethiopia after returning from Yemen. Over 3,700 had reached Djibouti after crossing the Red Sea, which Alexandre Coissac, the head of IOM’s mission in Djibouti, said "is therefore confronting movement in both directions: people fleeing Yemen are arriving as refugees, migrants continue travelling towards Yemen, and other migrants are returning." The IOM urgently called on the international community to provide funding for emergency relief. The Addis Standard said the figures likely underscored the true number of irregular migrants as the Eastern Route is both one of the largest irregular migration routes and that between 91% to 97% of movements are Ethiopian nationals.

=== 8 October ===
- BBC received more reports of Eritrean troops on several tens of trucks having passed through Adigrat and towards Edaga Hamus. ENDF and allied forces entered Wukro.
- Drone strikes against the EDF continued throughout 8 October, targeting EDF troops and ammunition. A witness speaking with AFP said "there were many, many drone strikes [on 7 October]," with another corroborating that there was a "massive explosion during the night." Both said the strikes had destroyed a number of EDF trucks and other military vehicles. Despite the strikes, the former witness added that there were "small pockets of the enemy forces still resisting and trying to create trouble."

=== 9 October ===
==== Hostilities ====
- The EDF and EPFAS retreated to the north following the 7 and 8 Adigrat drone attacks by Ethiopian forces. A resident told Reuters on 9 October that they had heard repeated explosions a few kilometers outside of Adigrat throughout the night and early morning. The EDF and EPFAS took up defensive position in Chersever, Debre Damo, Fatsi, Fiya Keshi, and Sebeya.
- ENDF forces took control of Shire, Atsibi, Freweyni, and Idaga Hamus.

==== Humanitarian crisis ====
- Areas in the southern Tigray, where food insecurity and famine had long been present and where fighting was predominantly taking place, were facing droughts which prolonged food insecurity into "crisis-level conditions" as classified by Phase 3 of the Integrated Food Security Phase Classification (IPC). Fighting disrupted fuel supplies, market activity, transportation, harvests—physically and monetarily restricting access to food, farmland, labor opportunities, and other essential goods. According to the Famine Early Warning Systems Network (FEWS NET), these conditions risked the IPC Phase 3 conditions continuing.
- 10 October

==== Hostilities ====
- The ENDF and allied militias entered Adigrat the night of 9 October through 10 October without further resistance. EDF troops remained stationed outside of the city.
- The TPLF withdrew from the town of Adwa.

==== Diplomatic ====
- Eritrea has asked the UN Security Council to intervene and take action against Ethiopia, saying that their accusations was a “declaration of war.”

=== 11 October ===
==== Hostilities ====
- A day after the TPLF had withdrawn from the town of Adwa, residents said ENDF troops had entered the town.

==== Diplomatic ====
- After resuming service to the Mekele airport, senior Ethiopian officials visited Mekele and Adigrat.

=== 12 October ===
- ENDF troops move outside of Sheraro but do not enter despite it not being in control by any belligerent at the time.
- ENDF and government-aligned militias take control of Adi Daero, Adi Nbried, Adi Hageray, and Adi Awala in Tigray.
- ENDF troops reportedly entered Zalambessa and Fatsi, the former of which EDF troops had entered the week prior. EPFAS troops which had withdrawn from it stationed themselves west and southwest of Zalambessa, towards Debre Dama and Irob, respectively.

=== 14 October ===
- The ENDF took control of Rama and Axum.

=== 16 October ===
- Ethiopian Prime minister Abiy Ahmed announced that a new interim administration had been set up in Tigray.

=== 17–18 October ===
- During clashes near Mirena on 17 and 18 October, the TPLF claimed to have killed 1,511 ENDF members, 11 Tigray Peace Force members, and wounded 1,050 as government troops advanced towards Adet.

=== 19–20 October ===
- The TPLF and allied Agaw captured Nirak, the main town of Abergele woreda in the Amhara Region, on 19 October. They retreated as the ENDF entered the town the following day.

=== 26 October ===
- Schools resumed classes in Mekelle after having been closed due to the offensive.
- 60 people have been killed in Oromo, primarily Christians following a series of attacks claimed to have been conducted by the Oromia Liberation Army. The Orthodox church has condemned the violence.

=== 28 October ===
- Ethiopian prime minister Abiy Ahmed has said a purchase and delivery of several Sukhoi Su-35 fighters to Ethiopia, as well as plans to install S-400 air defense systems.

=== 30 October ===
- Reports say 12 civilians were killed and several injured following drone strikes on the morning of 30 October in Rama, Tigray.

=== 31 October ===
- Drone strikes were reported to have been conducted in Amhara on 31 October, with one hitting a displacement camp, killing at least 15 people, several being children with an unknown amount of injuries. 2 injuried casualties died in a hospital.
- The TPLF stated on 2 November that it had killed 500 and wounded 800 ENDF soldiers on 31 October in Aksum.

=== 3 November ===
- The ENDF entered Sheraro.

=== 6 November ===
- The ENDF again moved towards Rama.
- The interim administration in Tigray imposed an indefinite nighttime curfew restriction, prohibiting residents from moving outside their homes from 7:00 pm to 6:00 am.
