= Mereb Lehe =

District in Tigray Region, Ethiopia

Coordinates: 14°00′N 39°10′E

Mereb Lehe መረብ ለኸ
- Woreda
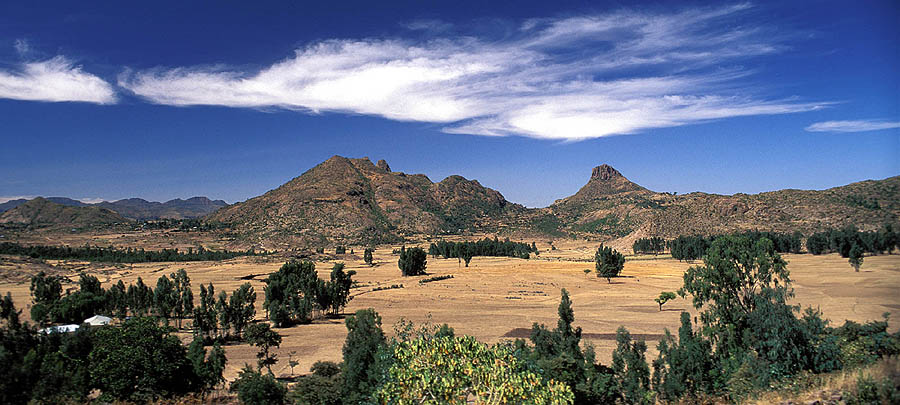

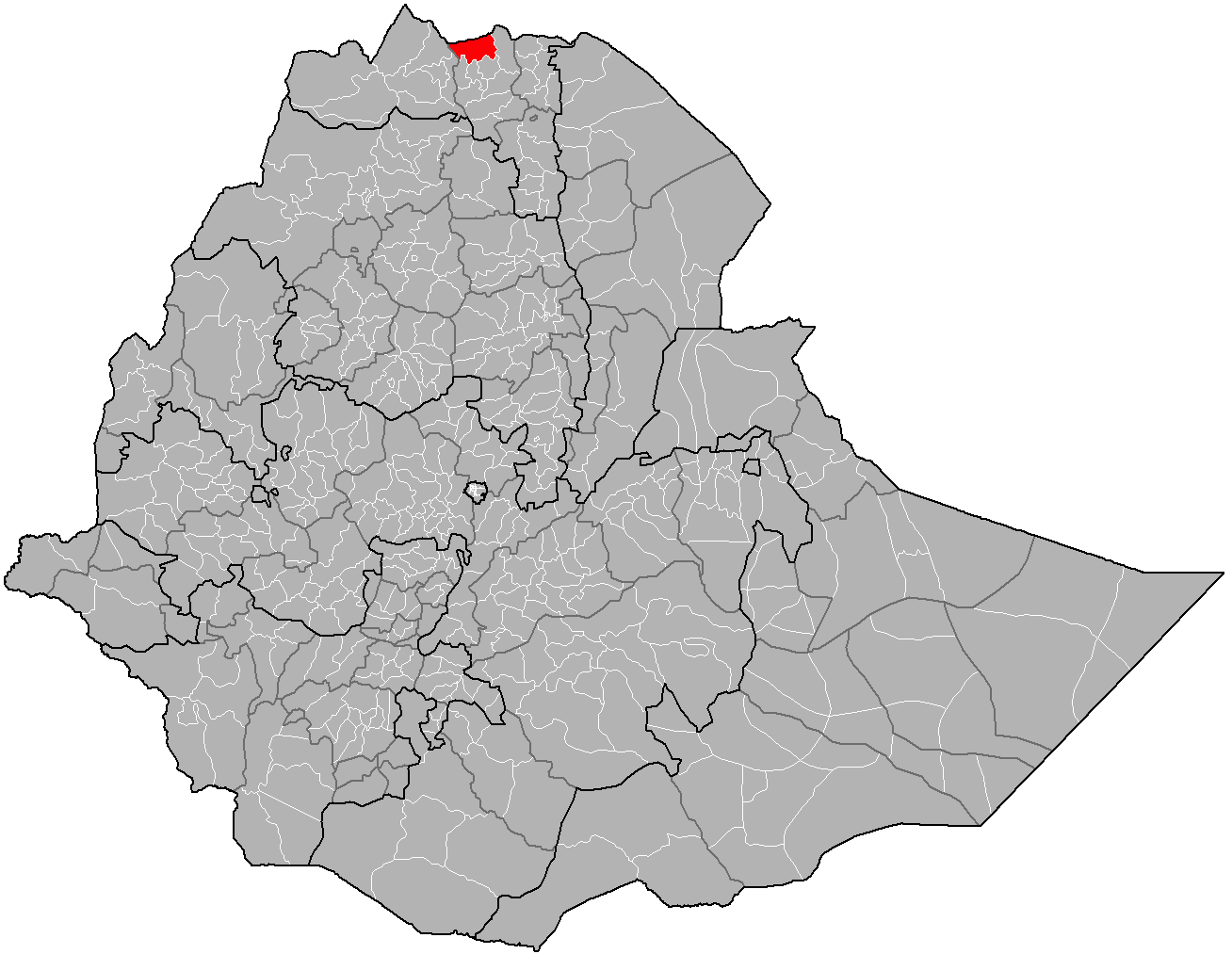
- Country: Ethiopia
- Region: Tigray
- Zone: Maekelay (Central)
- Administrative centre: Rama

Area
  - Total: 2,521.70 km^{2} (973.63 sq mi)

Population (2007)
  - Total: 107,218

Mereb Lehe (Tigrinya: መረብ ለኸ) is a woreda in Tigray Region, Ethiopia. Part of the Maekelay Zone, it is bordered on the south by La'ilay Maychew, on the southwest by Tahtay Maychew, on the west by the Semien Mi'irabawi (North Western) Zone, on the north by the Mareb River (which separates it from Eritrea), on the east by Enticho, and on the southeast by Adwa. The administrative center of this woreda is Rama; other towns include La'ilay Merhisenay.

== Demographics ==
According to the 2007 national census conducted by Ethiopia's Central Statistical Agency (CSA), this woreda had a total population of 107,218—an increase of 37.29% since the 1994 census. Of this population, 53,425 were men and 53,793 were women, with 7,911 people, or 7.38%, living in urban areas. With an area of 2,521.70 square kilometers, Mereb Lehe has a population density of 42.52, which is less than the Zone average of 56.29 persons per square kilometer. A total of 23,370 households were counted in this woreda, resulting in an average of 4.59 persons per household and 22,531 housing units. The majority of the inhabitants said they practiced Ethiopian Orthodox Christianity, with 96.93% reporting that as their religion, while 2.97% of the population were Muslim.

The 1994 national census reported a total population for this woreda of 78,094, of whom 38,906 were men and 39,188 were women; 5,098 or 6.53% of its population were urban dwellers. The largest ethnic group reported in Mereb Lehe was the Tigrayan (99.56%). Tigrinya was spoken as a first language by 99.7%. 98.41% of the population practiced Ethiopian Orthodox Christianity, and 1.55% were Muslim. Concerning education, 9.64% of the population were considered literate, which is less than the Zone average of 14.21%; 10.62% of children aged 7–12 were in primary school; a negligible number of the children aged 13–14 were in junior secondary school, and 0.14% of the inhabitants aged 15–18 were in senior secondary school. Concerning sanitary conditions, about 25% of the urban houses and 6% of all houses had access to safe drinking water at the time of the census; about 6% of the urban and 2.5% of the total had toilet facilities.

== Agriculture ==
A sample enumeration performed by the CSA in 2001 interviewed 18,660 farmers in this woreda, who held an average of 0.85 hectares of land. Of the 15,776 hectares of private land surveyed, 85.92% was in cultivation, 1.19% pasture, 10.02% fallow, 0.08% woodland, and 2.78% was devoted to other uses. For the land under cultivation in this woreda, 84.12% was planted in cereals, 1.11% in pulses, 0.41% in oilseeds, and 0.15% in vegetables. The area planted in fruit trees was four hectares and two hectares in gesho. 76.55% of the farmers both raised crops and livestock, while 22.23% only grew crops and 1.22% only raised livestock. Land tenure in this woreda is distributed amongst 82.52% owning their land, and 16.68% renting; the amount in other forms of tenure is missing.

== 2020 woreda reorganisation ==
As of 2020, woreda Mereb Lehe's territory belongs to the following new woredas:

- Chila
- Rama
- Ahsea
