= Gondrand massacre =

1936 massacre in Ethiopia

Gondrand Massacre
- Part of the Second Italo-Ethiopian War
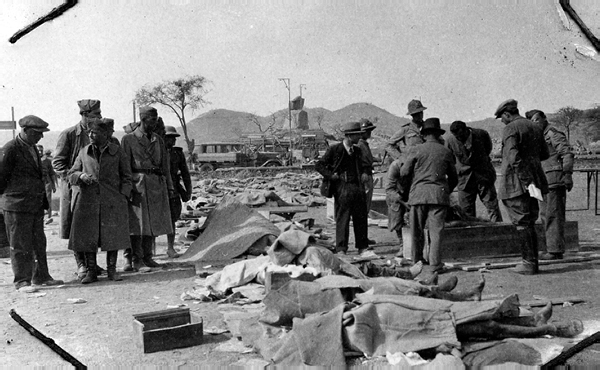
- Victims of the massacre
- Location: Near Mai Lahlà, Ethiopia
- Date: February 13, 1936
- Target: Italian workers of the Gondrand Company
- Victims: 85 killed 27 wounded 4 missing 40 Ethiopian soldiers killed
- Perpetrator: Imperial Ethiopian Army

The Gondrand massacre was a 1936 Ethiopian attack on Italian workers of the Gondrand company. The massacre was reported to the League of Nations and was publicized by Fascist Italy in an attempt to justify its ongoing invasion of Ethiopia.

== Background ==
After reoccupying Shire Enda Selassie following the December offensive, Ras Imru implemented a tactic of guerrilla warfare. He organized several highly mobile units of 400 to 500 men that were sent behind enemy lines and reached as far as Italian Eritrea.

In the locality of Wtok Emni near Mai Lahlà, located in the rear of Ethiopian territory in the immediate vicinity of the border with Italian Eritrea, the National Transport Company Gondrand was busy with the construction of colonial roads and near the village of Daro Taclè it had placed its construction site no. 1, engaged in the widening of the road between Asmara and Adwa.

== The massacre ==
On the night of 12 February 1936, a band of 100 men under the command of the Fitawrari Chenfè came across the camp of civilian workers for the logistics company Gondrand, engaged at the time in road construction near the northern Ethiopian town of Mai Lahlà, the current Rama. Under the orders of Ras Imru, the Ethiopians then attacked the camp at dawn. The construction yard was equipped with about 15 muskets, and the workers also used their work tools as defense weapons, but they were overwhelmed by the surprise attack of the Ethiopians.

The massacre was discovered a few hours later by a unit of the 41st Regiment: the soldiers found that many of the Italian corpses had been mutilated or castrated. Captain Armando Rizzi of the Engineers distinguished himself in the action, commanding his company and putting to flight an enemy rearguard patrol, an action which earned him the War Cross for Military Valor.

== Casualties ==
Of the 130 workers present, 68 Italians and 17 Eritreans were killed, while 27 others were wounded and four went missing. Of these, two were later confirmed to have been taken prisoner.

About 40 Ethiopian soldiers also died in the attack, mostly because a store of gelignite exploded. Retaliatory massacres were carried out by Italian soldiers against Ethiopian civilians in the aftermath of the attack, resulting in untold deaths. On 7 March 1936, objects from the construction site were discovered by the Libyan spahis of the 2nd Italian Army Corps during an inspection of the village of Adi Anfitò. The inhabitants were then rounded up in a church and massacred in retaliation.

The notification of the massacre, given to the League of Nations by the Italian authorities

== Aftermath ==
Italian authorities generally instructed journalists to avoid describing Italian losses during the war, but in this case the story was deliberately promoted for its propaganda value in depicting Ethiopians as barbaric.

The killing of Italian pilot Tito Minniti and his copilot happened some weeks before and together with this massacre was the reason given by the Italians for the use of gas against the Ethiopians, a claim supported by historians like Tripoli and Pedriali. However, as professor of Italian studies David Forgacs argues, while "the Italians sought to give maximum publicity to the massacre of Italian civilians by Ethiopians at the Gondrand camp they were equally strenuous in their efforts to prevent records or reports of their own massacres of civilians".

In response to photographic evidence that some Ethiopian troops had ignored the order against mutilating corpses, Ethiopia's Foreign Minister was forced to admit that it had happened, but argued that it should be seen as an act of protest against Italian atrocities. Italian Foreign Minister retaliated to him arguing that this kind of "protest" (murdering civilian workers and also two women) was a clear indication of the low level of civilization of the Ethiopians.

In 1965, Ras Imru Haile Selassie defended the massacre during an interview with Angelo Del Boca, calling the attack a "legitimate act of war" because the camp was in a war zone and that the workers were armed.

== See also ==
- Second Italo-Ethiopian War
- Italian Ethiopia
- Tito Minniti
