= Edaga Arbi =

Edaga Arbi ዕዳጋ ዓርቢ
- Village
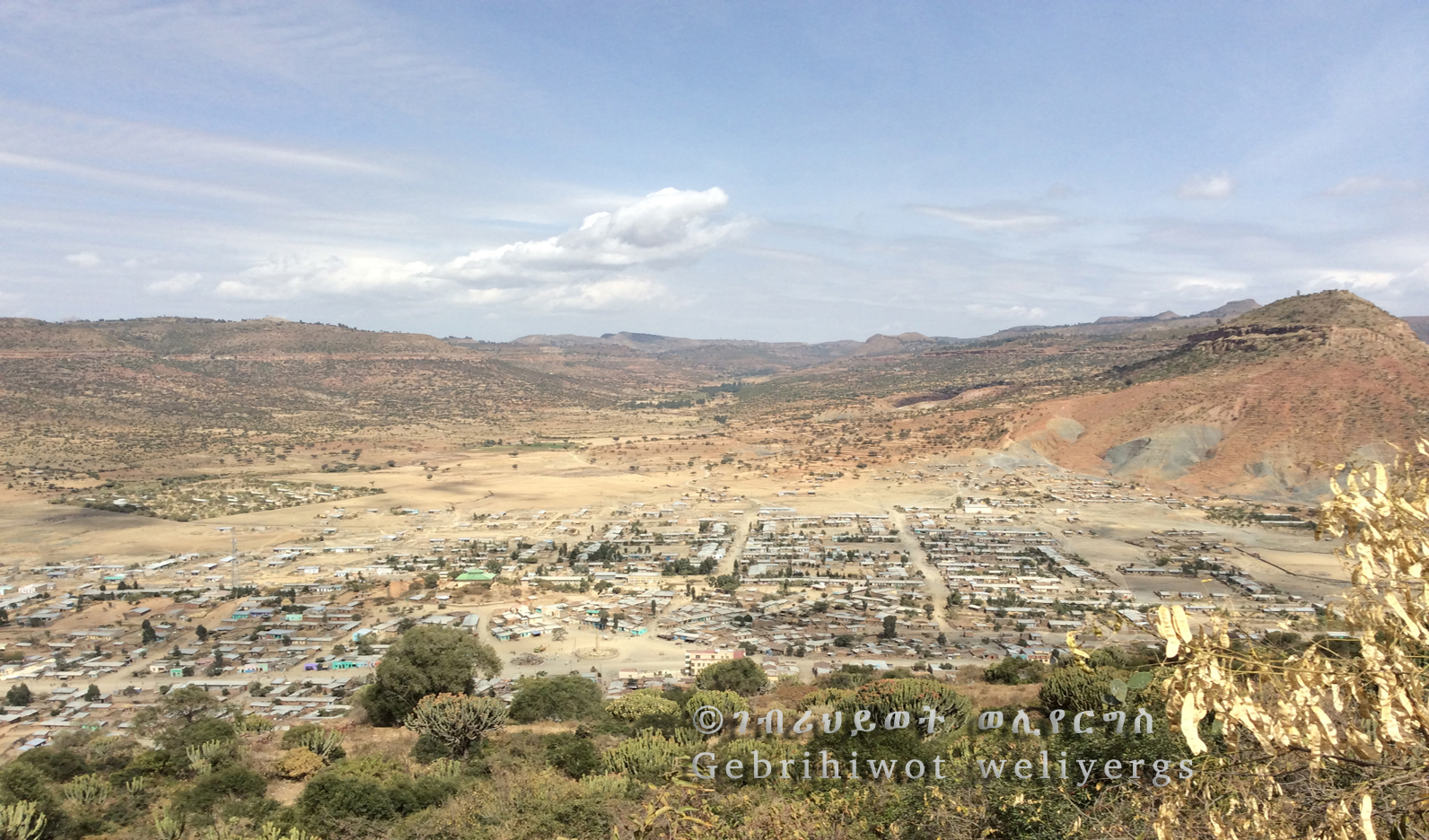

- Location within Ethiopia
- Coordinates: 14°16′N 39°27′E
- Country: Ethiopia
- Region: Tigray
- Zone: Makelawi (Central)
- Woreda: Werie Lehe
- Time zone: UTC+03:00 (EAT)
- Area code: (+251) 34

Edaga Arbi (Tigrinya: ዕዳጋ ዓርቢ) is a town in the Tigray Region of Ethiopia, 42 km south east of Adwa. It is the administrative and economic center of the Werie Lehe woreda. Edega Arbi is mainly known for its monastery.
