= Mahbere Dego massacres =

2021 extrajudicial killings in Ethiopia, as part of Tigray War

Coordinates: 14.02728°N 38.78002°E

- Part of Tigray War
- Location of Mahbere Dego in Tigray (Ethiopia)
- Location: Mahbere Dego, Tigray Region, Ethiopia
- Date: 16–18 January 2021
- Target: Tigrayans
- Attack type: Mass killing; Shelling; Ethnic cleansing
- Deaths: 50–74 civilians
- Perpetrator: Ethiopian National Defense Force

The Mahbere Dego massacres were mass extrajudicial killings that took place in Mahbere Dego (Tigrinya: ማሕበረ ደጎ) in the Tigray Region of Ethiopia during the Tigray War, on 16–18 January 2021. Mahbere Dego is a small town that belongs to woreda Na’ider, Central zone of Tigray.

== Massacre ==
The Ethiopian National Defense Force (ENDF) killed dozens of civilians in Mahbere Dego (Central Tigray). Videos of the massacres are not time stamped; the massacres are believed to have started on 15 January 2021 and continued for several days. The massacres occurred in a similar way as many massacres in the Tigray War. The ENDF targeted civilians, especially male, in this case merchants, farmers, often brothers or father and son. They filmed the killings, and, exceptionally, a whistleblower transmitted the videos to Tigrai Media House. Dozens of unarmed civilian men were grouped in the wilderness outside of the town, driven to a cliff edge and executed by the Ethiopian soldiers. Thanks to the particular geomorphology of the surroundings, the imagery could be geolocated. After factchecking the footage of the massacres was published by CNN and BBC.

The BBC spoke by phone to a resident of Mahbere Dego, who said the Ethiopian army took away 73 men from the town and surrounding area in January this year, including three of his relatives. He said none of them had been heard from since.

The BBC also spoke to a resident in a neighbouring village who said that his brother was among those killed in this massacre. He said that the killings took place in Mahbere Dego, and gave the same month: January 2021 - the government had declared victory in the conflict in November.

"They killed them at the cliff," he said — BBC, Evidence suggests Ethiopian military carried out massacre in Tigray,

Typical massacres committed by Ethiopian and Eritrean soldiers in the Tigray war are (1) revenge when they lose a battle; (2) to terrorise and extract information about whereabouts of TPLF leaders; (3) murder of suspected family members of TDF fighters; and (4) terrorising the Tigray society as a whole.

On 16 June 2021, Tigrai Media House broadcast additional footage of the massacre, showing that a female Amhara soldier was among the killers. Bellingcat confirmed that the video shows the same massacre as the earlier videos.

== Perpetrators ==
Relatives, investigators and international media interpreted the identity of the perpetrators as Ethiopian soldiers.

== Victims ==
The BBC mentions 73 victims, and the “Tigray: Atlas of the humanitarian situation” approximately 50 victims; 54 victims have been identified.

== Reactions ==
The Mahbere Dego massacres became world news, evidencing what is ongoing in Tigray. As a consequence, the Ethiopian embassy in London issued a “Statement on the Alleged Massacre in Mahbere Dego, Tigray”:

The Embassy condemns, in the strongest terms, any acts of violence and human rights violations towards innocent civilians and would like to reassure Ethiopians at home and abroad, its development partners, and the wider international community that the Government of Ethiopia remains committed to thoroughly investigating any serious allegations and has made its position unequivocally clear concerning human rights violations – no person, including serving soldiers, is above the law. In line with the Government’s obligation to uphold the rule of law and bring to account perpetrators of these crimes, special taskforces comprised of representatives from the Office of the Attorney General and the Federal Police Commission have been deployed to Tigray in recent weeks to carry out investigations on the ground aimed at establishing the facts — Ethiopian embassy, London, 3 April 2021,

After months of denial by the Ethiopian authorities that massacres occurred in Tigray, a joint investigation by OHCHR and the Ethiopian Human Rights Commission was announced in March 2021.

The “Tigray: Atlas of the humanitarian situation”, that documented this massacre received international media attention, particularly regarding its Annex A, that lists massacres in the Tigray War.
