= Maillingerstraße =

Street in Munich, Germany

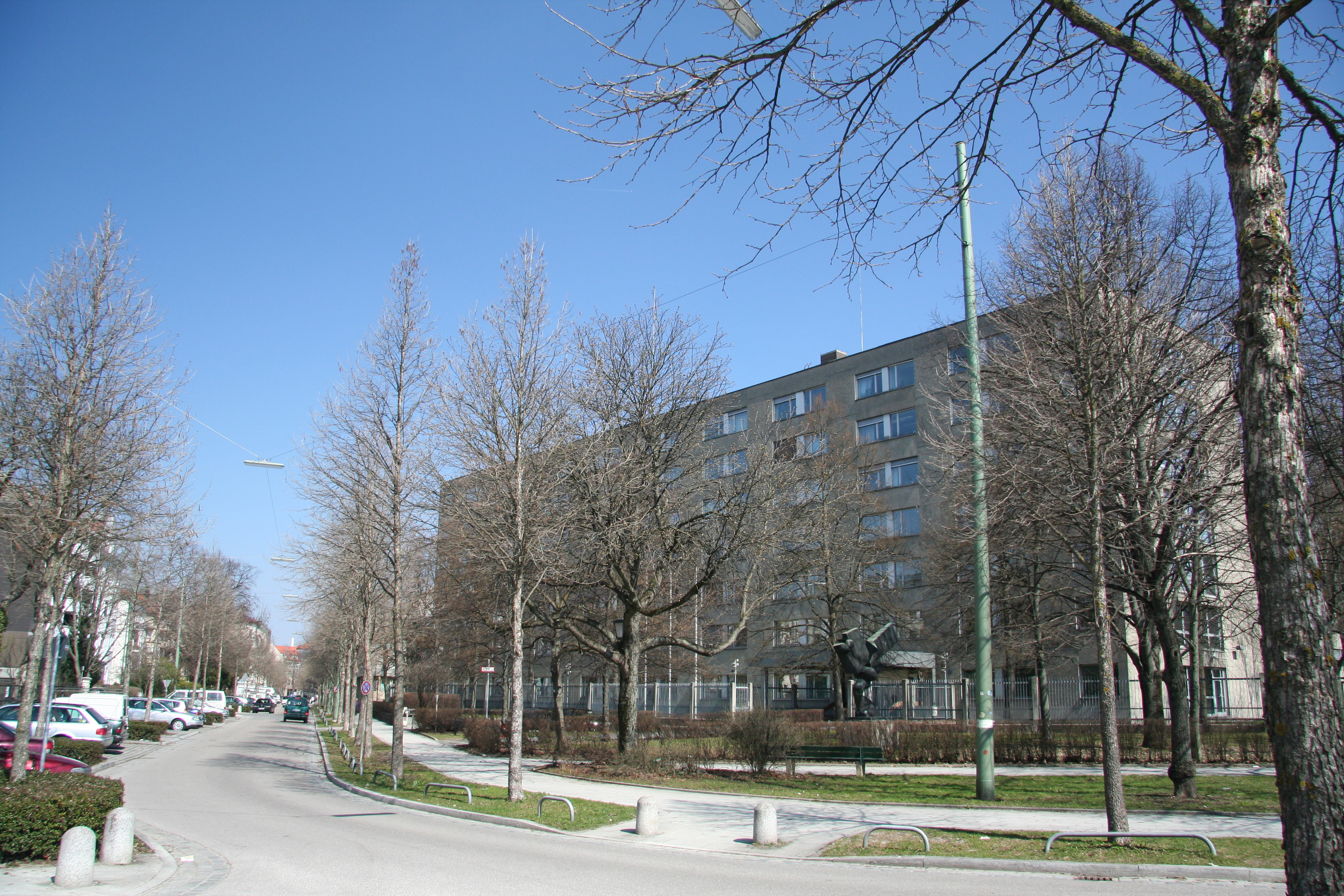
Maillingerstraße, view to the north with the Bavarian LKA (right)

Maillingerstraße is a street in the Munich districts of Maxvorstadt and Neuhausen. Running from north to south, it connects Nymphenburger Straße with Marsstraße. It is named after the Bavarian general and Minister of War Joseph Maximilian von Maillinger. The street has been named Maillingerstraße since 1886. Today Maillingerstraße is a traffic calmed secondary road.

== Historically Listed buildings ==
In the street, house numbers 11-13 were formerly barrack buildings. At Maillingerstraße 11, a three-story extension was built in 1979 for the payment agency for Bavarian state employees. Since 1968, the offices of the Bavarian State Office of Criminal Investigation have been located on the street, on the site of the artillery barracks, in which a part of the listed former barracks building at Maillingerstraße 15 was integrated. This building and five other four- to five-storey apartment buildings in Maillingerstraße are historically listed buildings. They refer to

- a four-storey building built in 1893, with a façade in late-Classicist layout at Maillinger Strasse 2,
- a built around 1890 four-story rental building as Sichtbacksteinbauweise with plaster structure in forms of Neo-Renaissance at Maillingerstraße 9,
- a five-storey rental building built in 1880 on Maillingerstraße 12 in late-Classicist style,
- a built around 1900 four-story rental building on Maillingerstraße 32, executed as a corner building with bay windows and octagonal dome, and
- a built around 1900 four-story rental building as a corner building in the style of the German Renaissance in the Maillingerstraße 34.
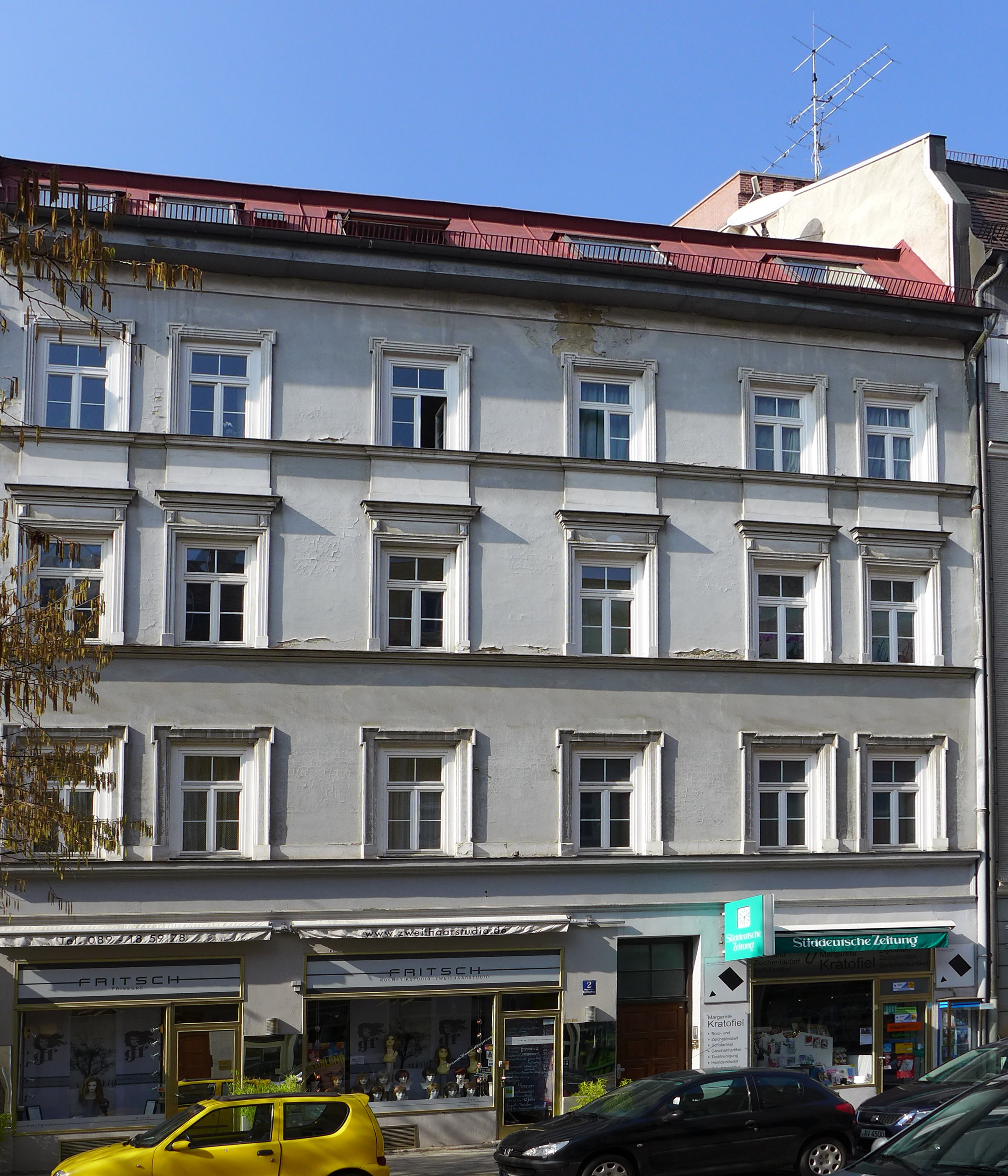
Maillingerstraße 2

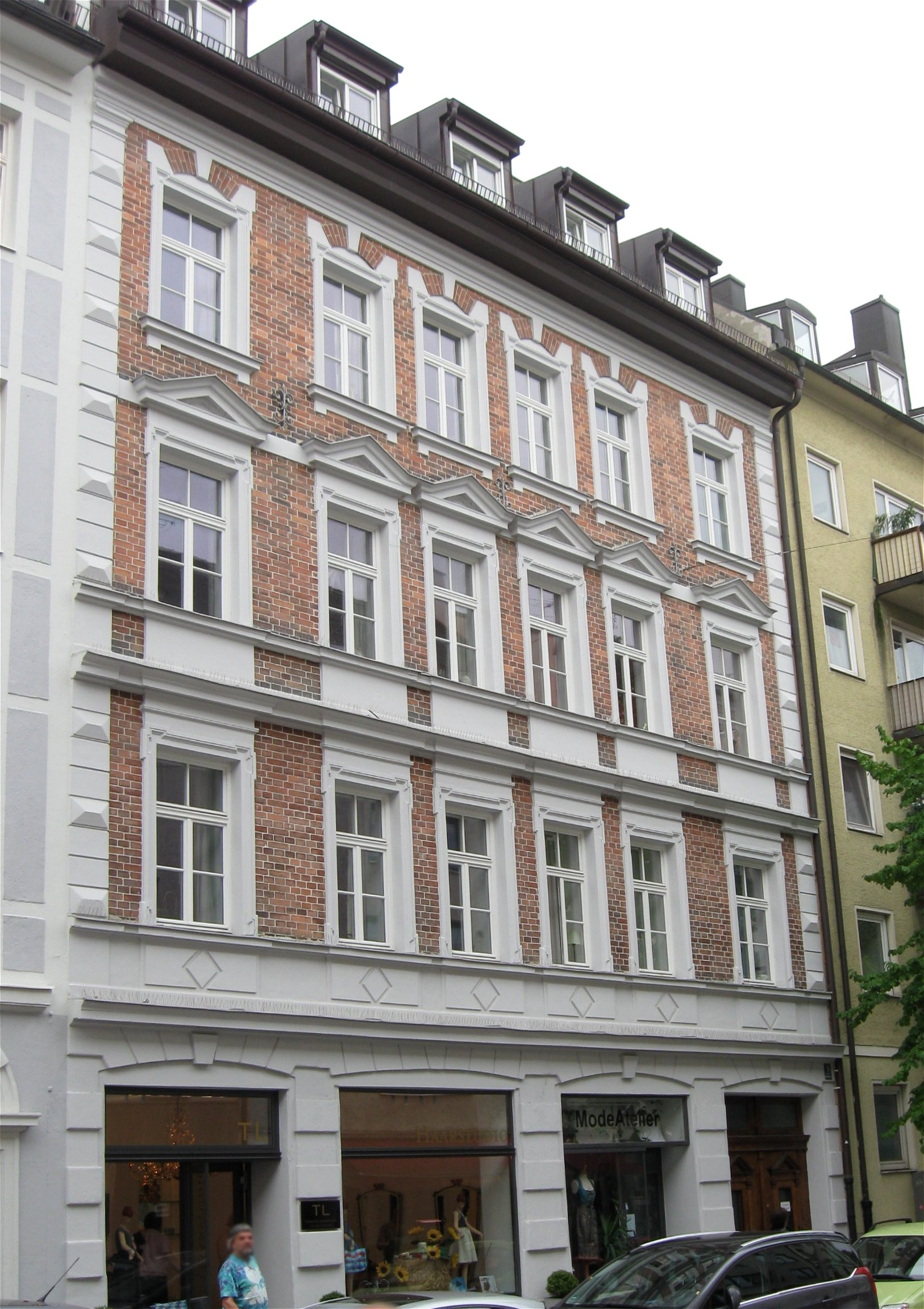
Maillingerstraße 9

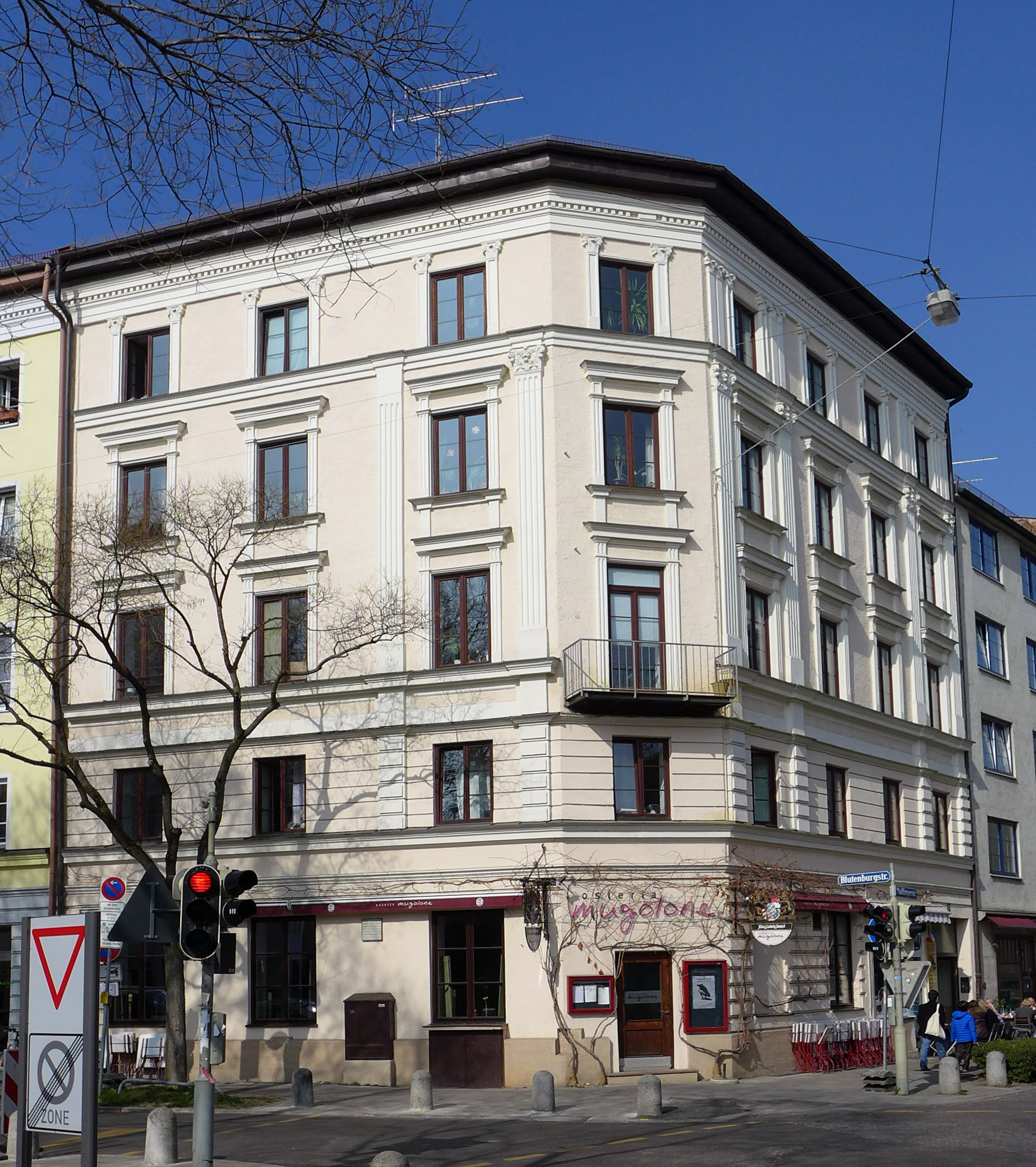
Maillingerstraße 12

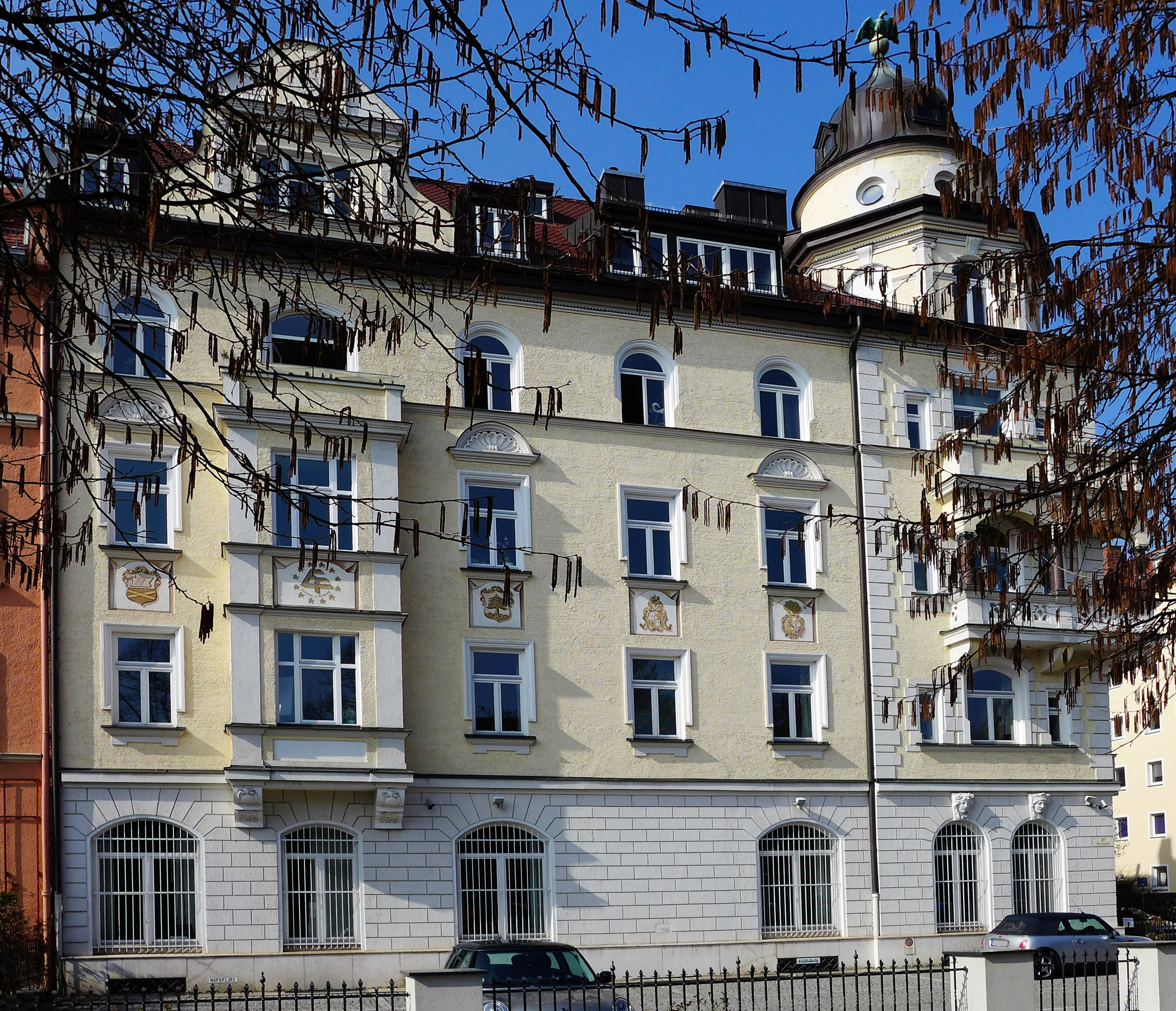
Maillingerstraße 32

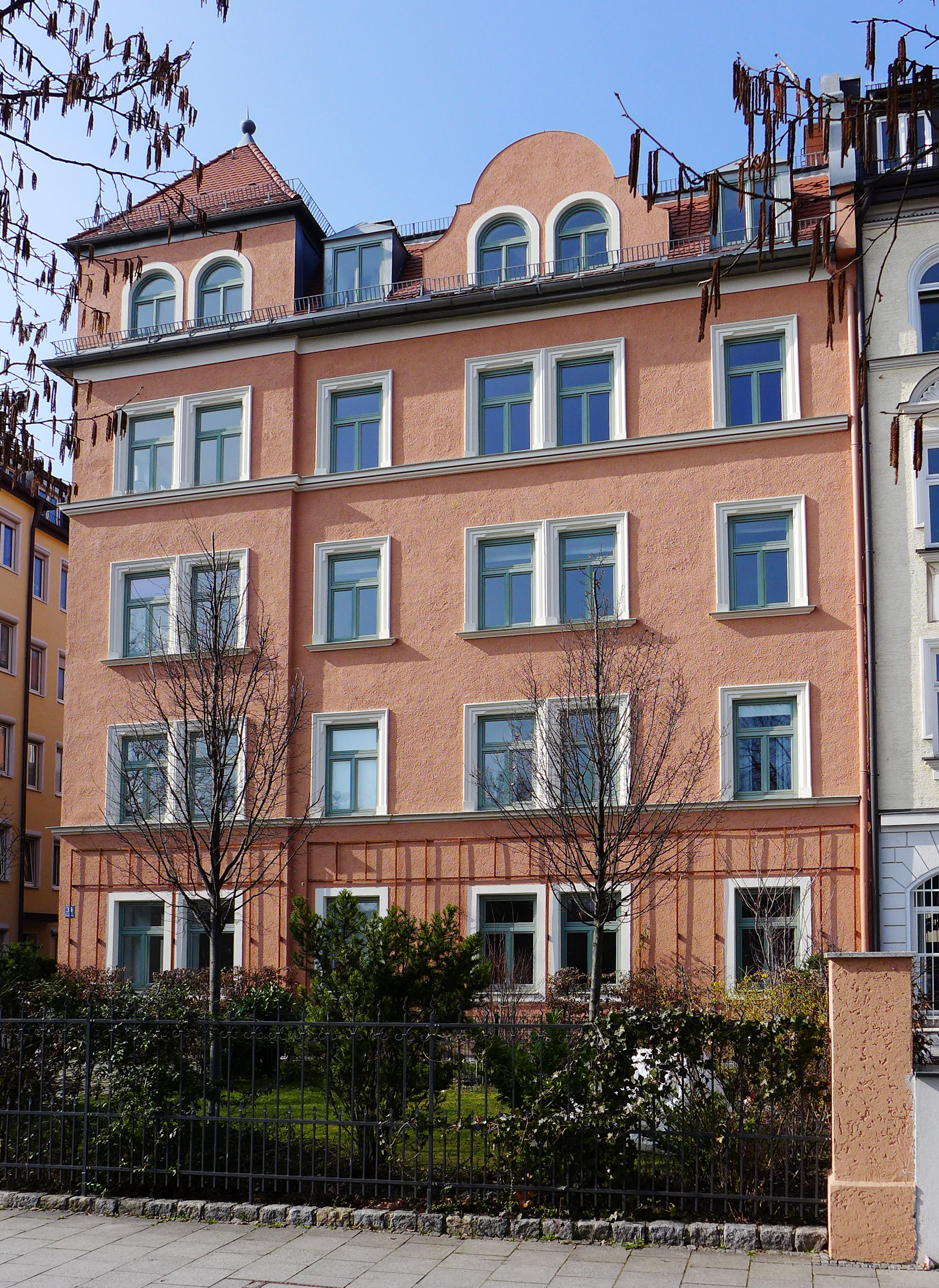
Maillingerstraße 34

== General History ==
The Bavarian industrialist Georg Krauß founded the locomotive factory Krauss & Comp. on the Marsfeld in Munich-Neuhausen on 17 June, 1866. It was painted in 1882 by Friedrich Perlberg. The factory was located at Maillingerstraße 33. A newly built administration building constructed in 1922/23 was sold to Deutsche Reichsbahn.

The composer Carl Orff, was born in 1895 in Maillingerstraße 16 and lived there until October 1939.

From 1924 on, the Grünsfelder brothers owned a wholesale metal shop at Maillingerstraße 23, the former bell foundry of Ulrich Kortler (1846-1928). They emigrated to the United States during Aryanization in Munich.

Areas which were part of Maillingerstraße were renamed in 1965/67 Helmholtzstraße (the Munich ATEGE camp II in Maillingerstraße 73 became Helmholtzstraße 15, for example), other areas were added to the newly established Marsstraße. From 1890, the street leading from Marsstraße was initially called Haslangstraße, (for a Bavarian field marshal), then from 1947, Baudrexelstraße, named after the master builder Josef Baudrexel (1861-1943). The State Salary Office was on Baudrexelstraße 2. After integration into the new building of the State Office of Criminal Investigation, it became Maillingerstraße 11.

The Consulate General of the Republic of Bosnia and Herzegovina was briefly housed in Maillingerstraße 32 in 1995.

== Cartography ==
Maillingerstraße is partially depicted in the Munich map in the 4th edition of Meyers Konversations-Lexikon (1888). In it, the area which corresponds to today's even house numbers (2-24) appears to be built on. The Munich map in the 14th edition of the Brockhaus Konversations-Lexikon (1891) shows the entire street had been developed further and includes the locomotive factory and the infantry barracks.

== Transportation history ==
From 21 October, 1876, the first line of Munich's horse tram from Promenade Square to what later became Burgfrieden-Maillingerstraße in Nymphenburger Straße, ended here, and was the precursor of the electric tram.

== Today's transportation connections ==
Maillingerstraße U-Bahn station, on Nymphenburger Straße, is near Maillingerstraße. The station is on the U1 / U7 lines of the Munich subway. The station opened on 8 May, 1983.
