= Rama, Ethiopia =

Rama Adi Arbaete Mai Lama
- Location within Ethiopia
- Coordinates: 14°25′N 38°47′E
- Country: Ethiopia
- Region: Tigray
- Zone: Mehakelegnaw (Central) Zone
- Woreda: Mereb Lehe

Population (>30000)
  - Total: 7,824
- Time zone: UTC+3 (EAT)

Rama (also called Mai Lala, Lala) is a town in Tigray, Ethiopia. It is located 35 km north of the town of Adwa and 7 kilometers from the border with Eritrea, in the Mehakelegnaw (Central) Zone of the Tigray Region. The town occupies a fertile lowland area and has a latitude and longitude of 14°25′N 38°47′E with an elevation of 1385 meters above sea level. It is the administrative center of Mereb Lehe woreda.

== History ==
=== 20th Century ===
In 1935, this was the location of the Gondrand massacre used as a major propaganda tool by Mussolini.

A point of interest in Rama is the nearby church, Kor Nebir Mikael. Records at the Nordic Africa Institute website provide details of a primary school in Rama in 1968.

On 29 September 1988, armed units of the Tigray People's Liberation Front overran Rama, killing 21 and capturing 854 government soldiers. This required the Derg to send a force to recover this important settlement on the road to Asmara, but it was not until late December that the 10th division of the Second Revolutionary Army fought its way into the town, only to be withdrawn a week before the decisive Battle of Shire.

=== 21st Century ===
In January, 2005, the United Nations Mission in Ethiopia and Eritrea reported that MECHEM had removed land mines from 12 kilometers of track leading to Rama. These mines had been laid during the Eritrean-Ethiopian War.

During the 2020-2021 Tigray War, attacks were carried out on Rama by the joint Ethiopian and Eritrean armies. On 19 December 2020, a foreign diplomat stated that "thousands" of Eritrean soldiers are fighting in Tigray. Two diplomats stated that Eritrean troops entered Ethiopia through three northern border towns: Zalambessa, Rama and Badme.

== Demographics ==
Based on figures from the Central Statistical Agency in 2005, this town had an estimated total population of 7,824 of whom 3,705 were males and 4,119 were females. The 1994 census reported it had a total population of 4,504 of whom 1,973 were males and 2,531 were females. Rama is also the main fruit source in Tigray, the largest dam of irrigation was built in this town. since the demand for fruits like mango, orange, banana, and others has been increasing in Tigray esp in Mekelle the government of Tigray proposed the dam to be made and now it is starting it function. in Rama there are 2 elementary schools( RSSS and Memanu elementar) RSSS was built when haileselassie was on power, 1 high school and 1 preparatory.
