= Tahtay Maychew =

District in Tigray Region, Ethiopia

Coordinates: 40°10′N 38°30′E

Tahtay Maychew ታሕታይ ማይጨው
- Woreda
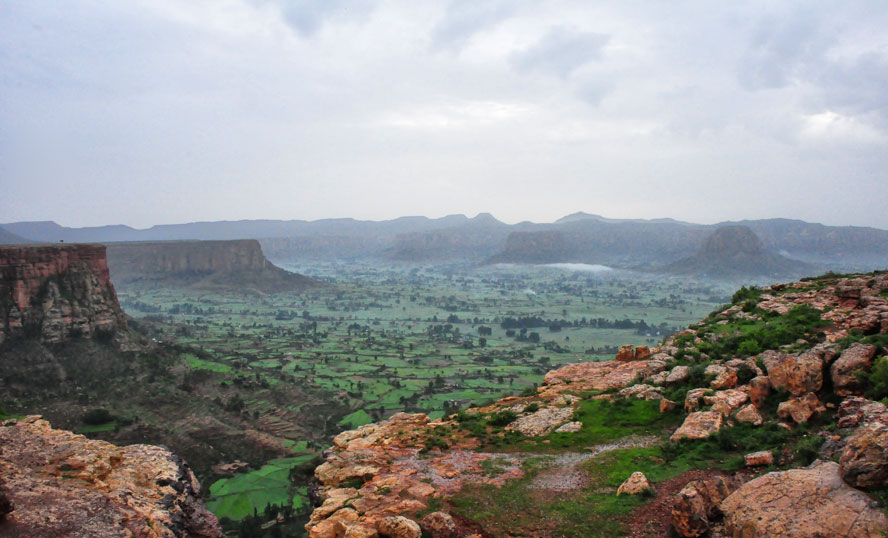

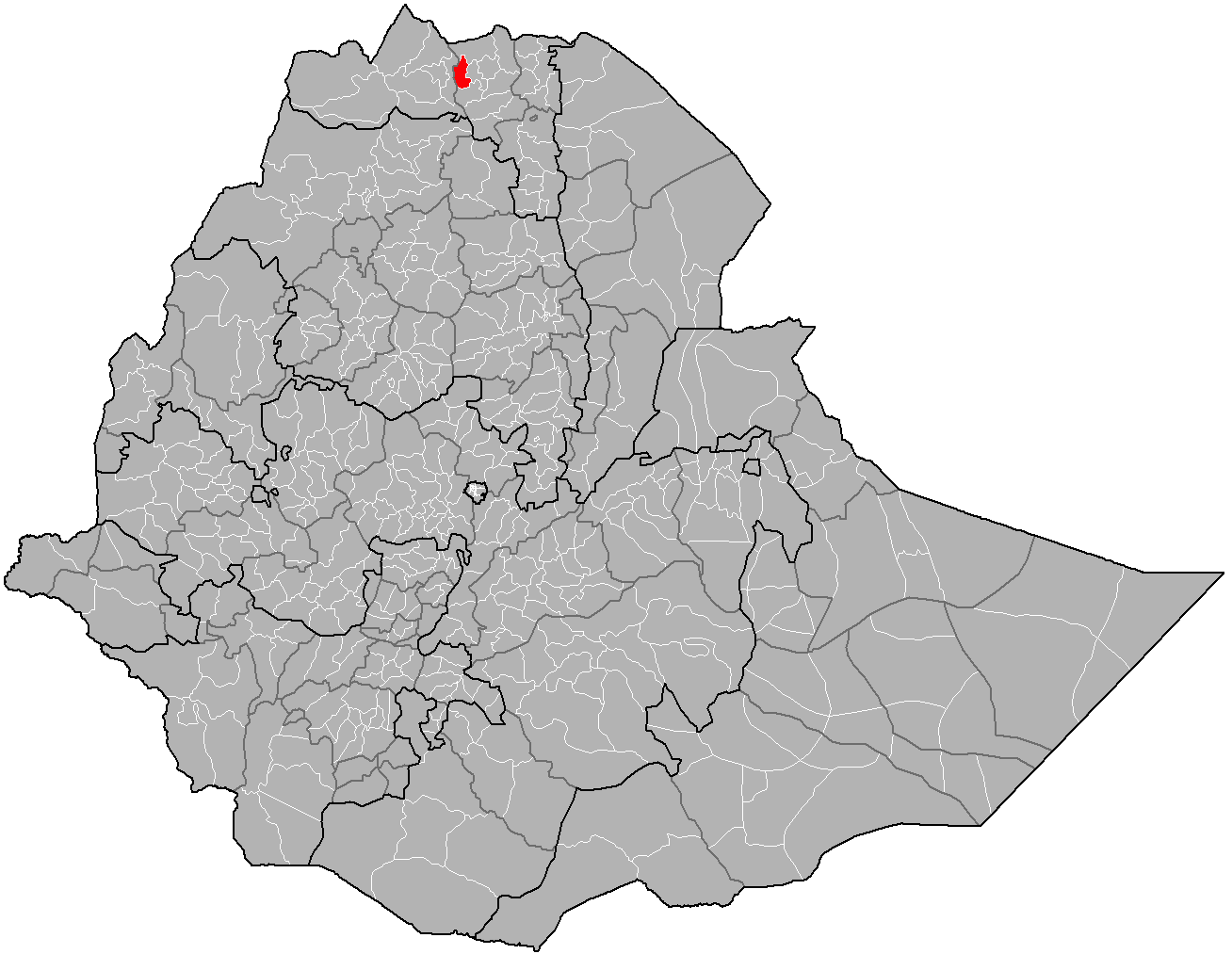
- Country: Ethiopia
- Region: Tigray
- Zone: Mehakelegnaw Zone

Area
  - Total: 1,954.29 km^{2} (754.56 sq mi)

Population (2007)
  - Total: 99,122

Tahtay Maychew (Tigrinya: ታሕታይ ማይጨው, "Lower Salty Water") is a woreda in Tigray Region, Ethiopia. Part of the Mehakelegnaw (Central) Zone, Tahtay Maychew is bordered on the south by Naeder Adet, on the west by the Semien Mi'irabawi (North Western) Zone, on the north by Mereb Lehe, and on the east by La'ilai Maychew. The administrative center of this woreda is Wukro Marai; other towns in Tahtay Maychew include Chila.

== Demographics ==
Based on the 2007 national census conducted by the Central Statistical Agency of Ethiopia (CSA), this woreda has a total population of 99,122, an increase of 26.17% over the 1994 census, of whom 48,623 are men and 50,499 women; 11,187 or 11.29% are urban inhabitants. With an area of 1,954.29 square kilometers, Tahtai Maichew has a population density of 50.72, which is less than the Zone average of 56.29 persons per square kilometer. A total of 22,096 households were counted in this woreda, resulting in an average of 4.49 persons to a household, and 21,545 housing units. The majority of the inhabitants said they practiced Ethiopian Orthodox Christianity, with 96.76% reporting that as their religion, while 3.22% of the population were Muslim.

The 1994 national census reported a total population for this woreda of 78,562, of whom 38,801 were men and 39,761 were women; 5,272 or 6.71% of its population were urban dwellers. The largest ethnic group reported in Tahtai Maichew was the Tigrayan (99.87%). Tigrinya was spoken as a first language by 99.94%. 96.43% of the population practiced Ethiopian Orthodox Christianity, and 3.5% were Muslim. Concerning education, 11.52% of the population were considered literate, which is less than the Zone average of 14.21%; 9.41% of children aged 7–12 were in primary school; 0.11% of the children aged 13–14 were in junior secondary school, and 0.05% of the inhabitants aged 15–18 were in senior secondary school. Concerning sanitary conditions, about 1.6% of the urban houses and 3% of all houses had access to safe drinking water at the time of the census; about 13% of the urban and 3% of the total had toilet facilities.

== Agriculture ==
A sample enumeration performed by the CSA in 2001 interviewed 17,931 farmers in this woreda, who held an average of 0.68 hectares of land. Of the 12,159 hectares of private land surveyed, 92.05% was in cultivation, 0.55% pasture, 4.24% fallow, 0.11% woodland, and 3.04% was devoted to other uses. For the land under cultivation in this woreda, 74.91% was planted in cereals, 15.16% in pulses, 1.02% in oilseeds, and 0.16% in vegetables. Gesho was planted in 25 hectares; the area planted in fruit trees is missing. 73.34% of the farmers both raised crops and livestock, while 25.06% only grew crops and 1.6% only raised livestock. Land tenure in this woreda is distributed amongst 89.99% owning their land, 9.66% renting, and 0.35% under other forms of tenure.
