= Wkro Mariyam =

Monolithic church in Ethiopia

Coordinates: 12°6′N 39°4′E

Wkro Mariyam is a monolithic church in northern Ethiopia. It is one of several churches located, in a remote region known as Amba Senneyti outside of the town of Nebelet, which is in the Mehakelegnaw Zone of the Tigray Region. It was first mentioned by the Catholic historian Manoel Barradas, whose Tractatus Tres Historico-Geographici was published in 1634. Its first modern description was published by Professor A. Mordini published a description of it in 1939.

The church is locally called wkro ("rock-hewn") to distinguish it from another church also dedicated to the Virgin Mary. (This spelling is used in this article to make it clear that this church is not in or near the town of Wukro.)

Ruth Plant described the pronaos and interior of Wkro Mariyam as "accurately carved", with three aisles and a depth of three bays, "with the central bay soaring considerably above the level of the ceiling rock of the side aisles." Plant singled out for mention the carved bosses in the center of the arches between the square pillars, and over the arch of the sanctuary "a rope-like carving found at Ghioghios, Maikado and elsewhere in the Tigre."

Although Lepage and Mercier in their survey of the churches of Tigray dated the construction of this church between 1350 and 1450, David Phillipson notes that the Amba Senneyti area resisted imperial rule until the late thirteenth century, "and it is tempting to see its eventual capitulation to King Amda Tsion early in the fourteenth century as a terminus ante quem for the initial excavation of the Maryam Wkro hypogeum.
