= La'ilay Maychew =

District in Tigray Region, Ethiopia

La'ilay Maychew ላዕላይ ማይጨው
- Woreda
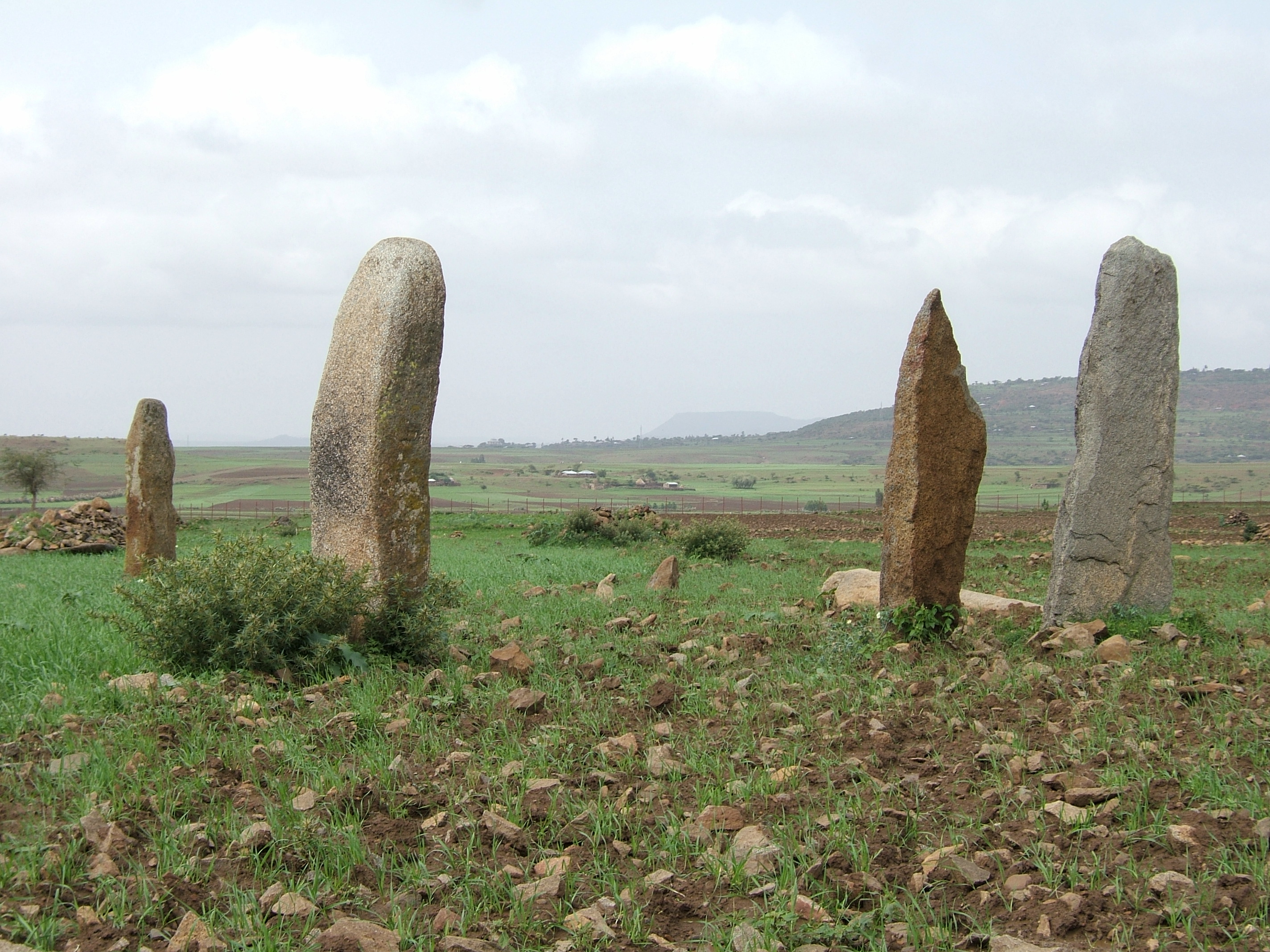

- Flag

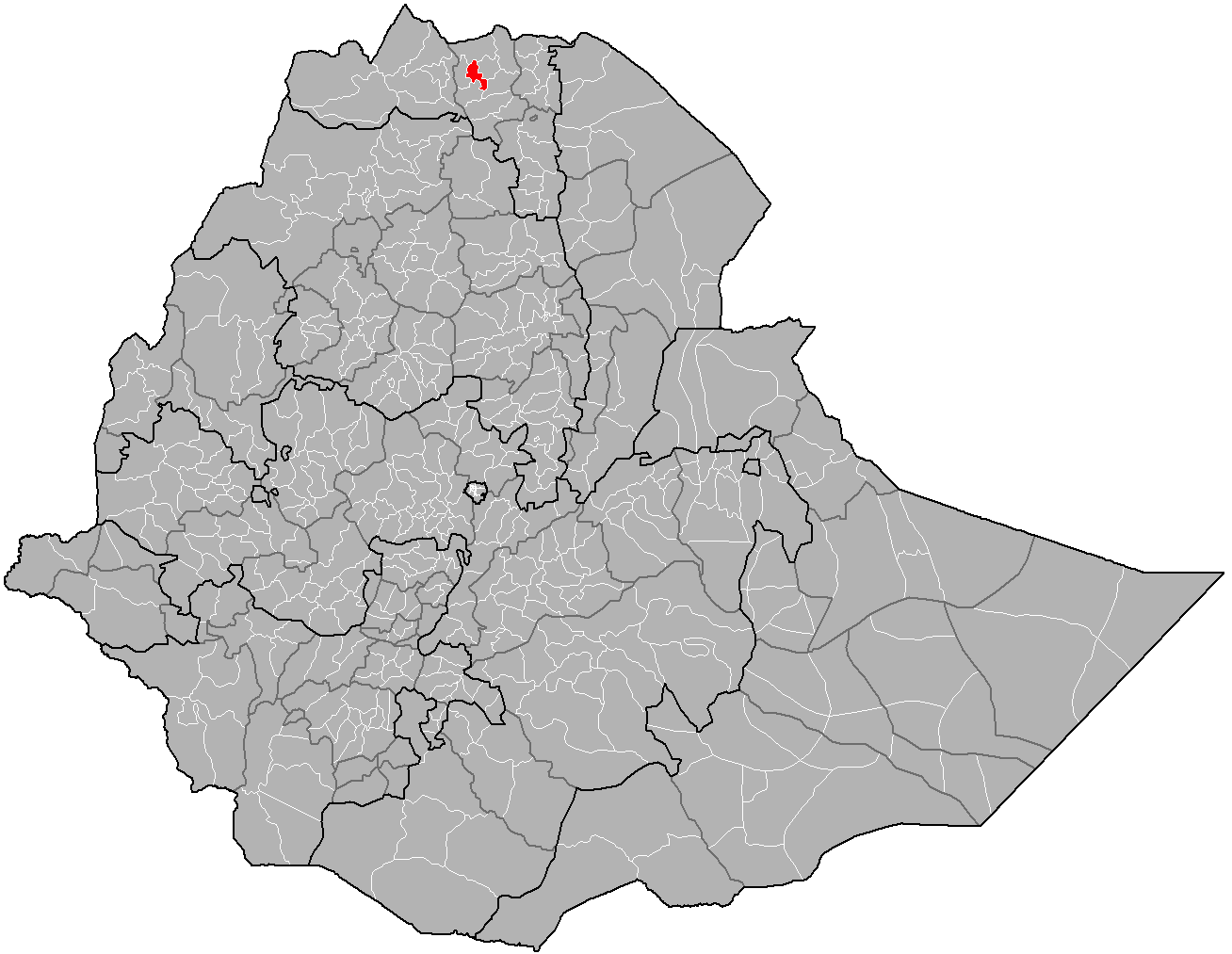
- Country: Ethiopia
- Region: Tigray
- Zone: Maekelay Zone(Central)

Area
  - Total: 1,873.35 km^{2} (723.30 sq mi)

Population (2007)
  - Total: 72,625

La'ilay Maychew (Tigrinya: ላዕላይ ማይጨው, transl. "Upper Salty Water") is a woreda in Tigray Region, Ethiopia. Part of the Maekelay Zone (central), La'ilay Maychew is bordered on the south by Naeder Adet, on the west by Tahtay Maychew, on the north by Mereb Lehe, and on the east by Adwa. The town of Axum is surrounded by La'ilay Maychew; other towns in La'ilay Maychew include Mahibere Degue.

High points in this woreda include Bet Giyorgis (2450 meters) and May Koho (2335 meters).

The Ethiopian Electric Power Corporation announced that it would provide 24-hour electrical service to five towns in Adwa, La'ilay Maychew and Naeder Adet, reaching a total of 100,000 new clients in all of the woredas. This new service would begin in June 2007.

== Demographics ==
Based on the 2007 national census conducted by the Central Statistical Agency of Ethiopia (CSA), the woreda has a total population of 72,625, an increase of 16.67% over the 1994 census, of whom 36,203 are men and 36,422 women; the census reported no urban inhabitants. With an area of 1,873.35 square kilometers, La'ilay Maychew has a population density of 38.77, which is less than the Zone average of 56.29 persons per square kilometer. A total of 14,698 households were counted in this woreda, resulting in an average of 4.94 persons to a household, and 14,203 housing units. The majority of the inhabitants said they practiced Ethiopian Orthodox Christianity, with 99.29% reporting that as their religion.

The 1994 national census reported a total population for this woreda of 90,123, of whom 43,927 were men and 46,196 were women; 27,973 or 31.04% of its population were urban dwellers. The largest ethnic group reported in La'ilay Maychew was the Tigrayan (99.53%). Tigrinya was spoken as a first language by 99.58%. 95.15% of the population practiced Ethiopian Orthodox Christianity, and 4.75% were Muslim. Concerning education, 25.61% of the population were considered literate, which is more than the Zone average of 14.21%; 34.67% of children aged 7–12 were in primary school; 7.44% of the children aged 13–14 were in junior secondary school, and 8.7% of the inhabitants aged 15–18 were in senior secondary school. Concerning sanitary conditions, about 75% of the urban houses and 30% of all houses had access to safe drinking water at the time of the census; 39% of the urban and 16% of the total had toilet facilities.

== Agriculture ==
A sample enumeration performed by the CSA in 2001 interviewed 15,093 farmers in this woreda, who held an average of 1.1 hectares of land. Of the 16,536 hectares of private land surveyed, 93.25% was in cultivation, 0.68% pasture, 3.37% fallow, 0.27% woodland, and 2.43% was devoted to other uses. For the land under cultivation in this woreda, 70.62% was planted in cereals, 21.6% in pulses, 0.79% in oilseeds, and 0.07% in vegetables. The area planted in fruit trees was 10 hectares and 11 hectares in gesho. 78.26% of the farmers both raised crops and livestock, while 21% only grew crops and 0.74% only raised livestock. Land tenure in this woreda is distributed amongst 82.12% owning their land, 17.43% renting, and 0.44% other forms of tenure.

== Tigray war ==
During the November 2020 to November 2022 Tigray war, war crimes in La'ilay Maychew included the killing of seven civilians on 8 January 2021 by the Eritrean Defence Forces (EDF) in Mirena (14.0249°N 38.6377°E), and the killing of twenty civilians on 2 February 2021 by the EDF in Mirena.
