= Mahibere Degue =

Town in Tigray Region, Ethiopia

Mahibere Degue ማሕበረ ደጎ Mahbere Dego
- Town
- Flag

- Location within Tigray Mahibere Degue (Ethiopia)
- Coordinates: 14.02728°N 38.78002°E
- Country: Ethiopia
- Region: Tigray
- Zone: Mehakelegnaw (Central)
- Woreda: Na’ider
- Time zone: UTC+3 (EAT)

Mahibere Degue (Tigrinya: ማሕበረ ደጎ), also transliterated as Mahbere Dego is a historical town in Tigray Region, Ethiopia. It is located 12.5 km south of the city of Axum. The town is known for its church, Enda Tsadkan ("Home of the Saints"), which is a popular tourist attraction.

Residents of the town engage in trade and agricultural activities in the surrounding villages. A local drink called Siwa is sold.

== The Mahbere Dego massacre ==
The Ethiopian National Defense Force (ENDF) killed dozens of civilians in Mahbere Dego in January 2021 in the context of the Tigray War. The ENDF targeted civilians, especially male, filming the killings which were later transmitted by a whistleblower.
Dozens of unarmed civilian men were grouped in the wilderness outside of the town, driven to a cliff edge and executed by the Ethiopian soldiers. Thanks to the particular geomorphology of the surroundings, the imagery could be geolocated.

After factchecking the footage of the massacres was published by CNN and BBC.

On 27 June CNN published more video material they received from Tigrai Media House, identifying one of the filming soldiers as "Fafi" and naming his brigade and division. In the extended video Fafi himself is seen taking part in the executions.
