= Naeder Adet =

District in Tigray Region, Ethiopia

Coordinates: 13°50′N 38°40′E

Naeder Adet ናዕዴር ዓዴት
- Woreda
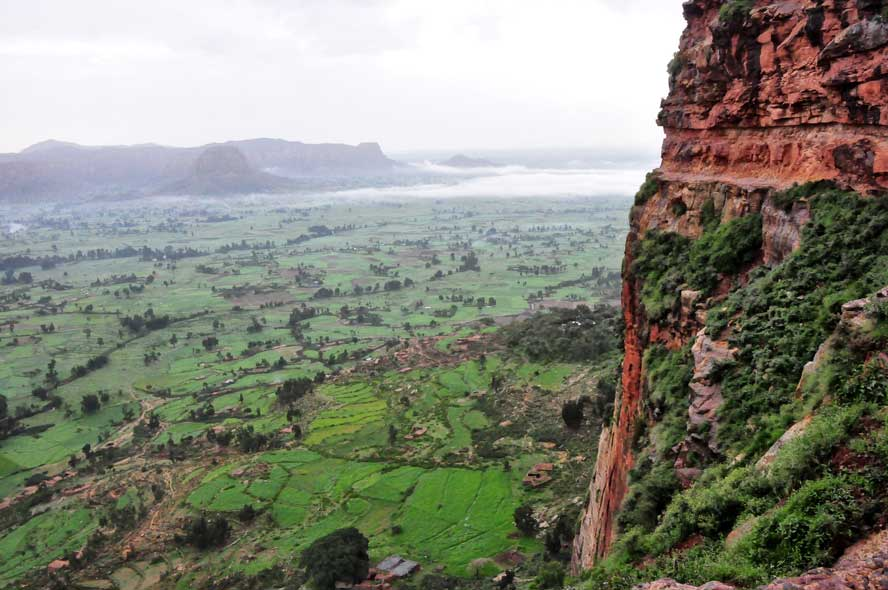

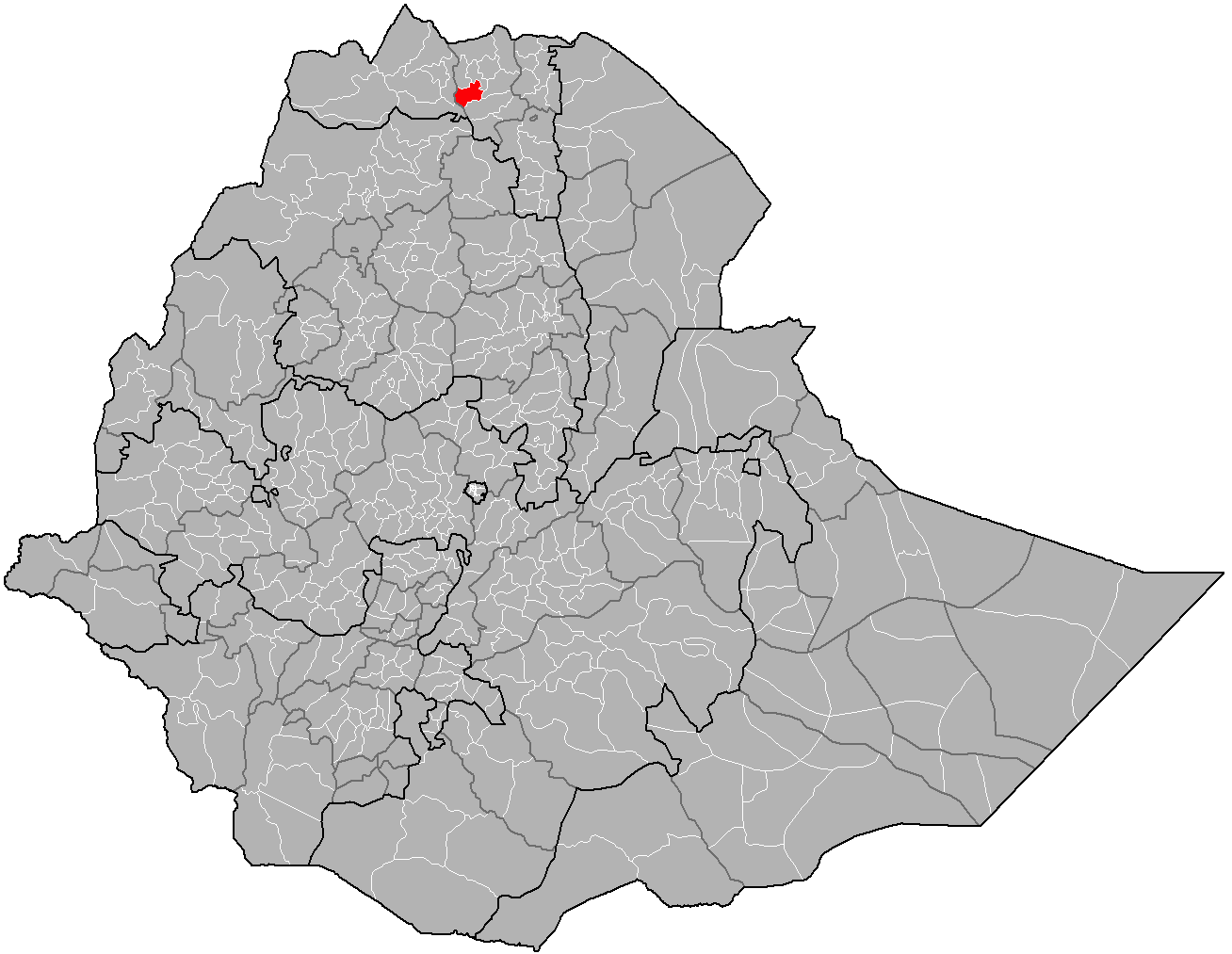
- Country: Ethiopia
- Region: Tigray
- Zone: Maekelay (Central)
- Administrative centre: Semema

Area
  - Total: 1,792.92 km^{2} (692.25 sq mi)

Population (2007)
  - Total: 104,966

Naeder Adet (Tigrinya: ናዕዴር ዓዴት) is a woreda in Tigray Region, Ethiopia. Part of the Maekelay Zone, Naeder Adet is bordered on the south by the Wari River which separates it from Kola Tembien, on the west by Semien Mi'irabawi (North Western) Zone, on the northwest by Tahtay Maychew, on the northeast by La'ilay Maychew, and on the east by Werie Lehe. The administrative center of this woreda is Semema; other towns in Naeder Adet include Edaga Selus and Mahbere Dego.

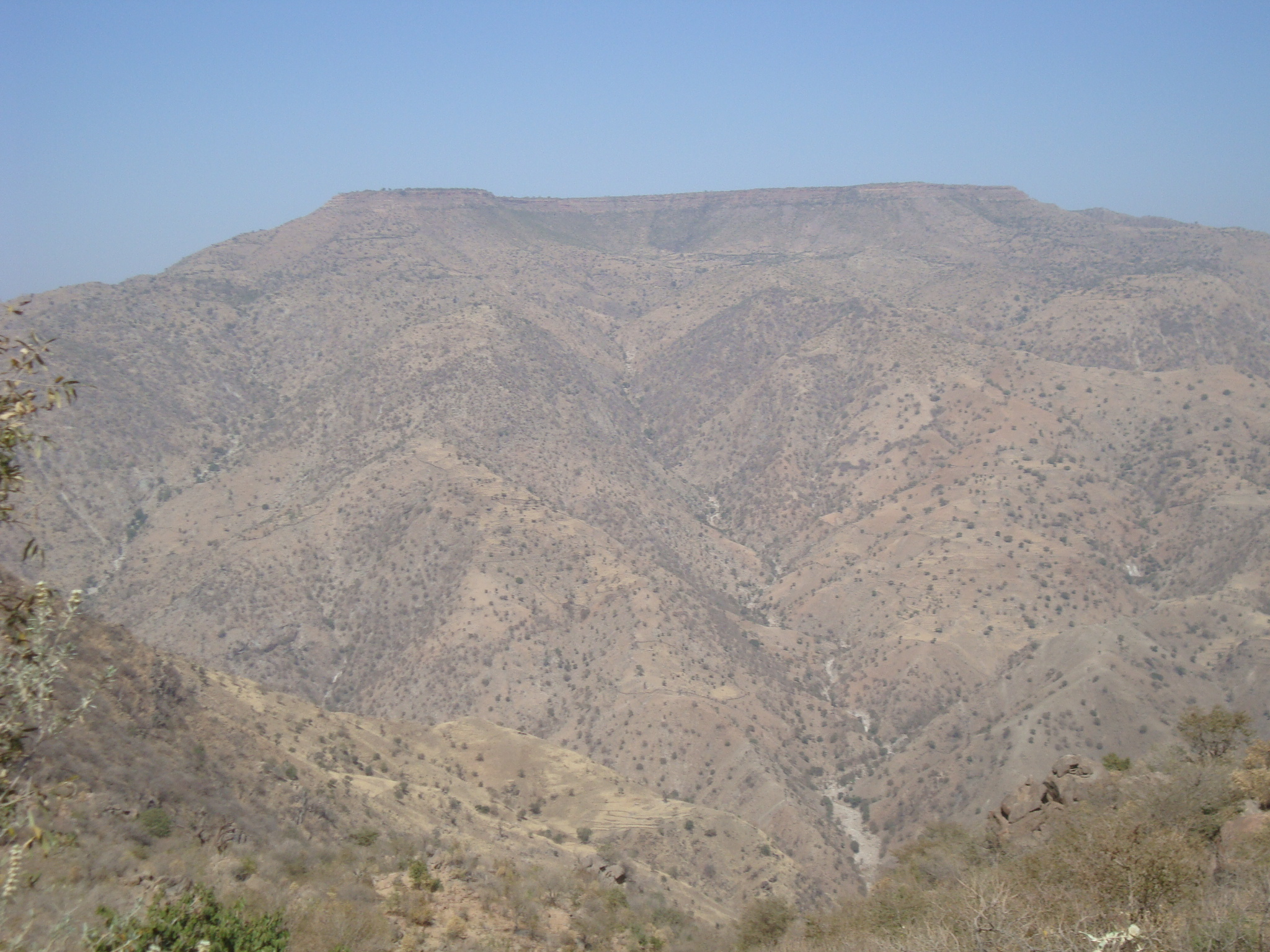
View on Adet across Weri'i gorge

== Overview ==
This woreda is named after the two historic districts that were combined to create it, Naeder and Adet. Adet is the western part and Naeder is the eastern. Naeder is mentioned in a fifteenth-century land charter of Emperor Zara Yaqob, and also occasionally over the centuries afterwards.

The Ethiopian Electric Power Corporation announced that it would provide 24-hour electrical service to five towns in Adwa, La'ilay Maychew and Naeder Adet, reaching a total of 100,000 new clients in all of the woredas. This new service would begin in June, 2007.

== Demographics ==
Based on the 2007 national census conducted by the Central Statistical Agency of Ethiopia (CSA), this woreda has a total population of 104,966, an increase of 23.57% over the 1994 census, of whom 52,061 are men and 52,905 women; 1,842 or 1.75% are urban inhabitants. With an area of 1,792.92 square kilometers, Naeder Adet has a population density of 58.54, which is greater than the Zone average of 56.29 persons per square kilometer. A total of 23,208 households were counted in this woreda, resulting in an average of 4.52 persons to a household, and 22,478 housing units. The majority of the inhabitants said they practiced Ethiopian Orthodox Christianity, with 98.61% reporting that as their religion, while 1.39% of the population were Muslim.

The 1994 national census reported a total population for this woreda of 84,942, of whom 42,015 were men and 42,927 were women; 1,125 or 1.32% of its population were urban dwellers. The largest ethnic group reported in Naeder Adet was the Tigrayan (99.95%). Tigrinya was spoken as a first language by 99.97%. 98.3% of the population practiced Ethiopian Orthodox Christianity, and 1.54% were Muslim. Concerning education, 7.4% of the population were considered literate, which is less than the Zone average of 14.21%; 4% of children aged 7–12 were in primary school; a negligible number of the children aged 13–14 were in junior secondary school, and a negligible number of the inhabitants aged 15–18 were in senior secondary school. Concerning sanitary conditions, about 86% of the urban houses and about 17% of all houses had access to safe drinking water at the time of the census; 11% of the urban and 3% of the total had toilet facilities.

== Agriculture ==
A sample enumeration performed by the CSA in 2001 interviewed 22,148 farmers in this woreda, who held an average of 0.69 hectares of land. Of the 15,389 hectares of private land surveyed, 89.51% was in cultivation, 1.47% pasture, 5.96% fallow, 0.05% woodland, and 3.03% was devoted to other uses. For the land under cultivation in this woreda, 75.27% was planted in cereals, 10.18% in pulses, 3.48% in oilseeds, and 0.24% in vegetables. Eight hectares were planted in fruit trees and 35 in gesho. 82.43% of the farmers both raised crops and livestock, while 14.67% only grew crops and 2.9% only raised livestock. Land tenure in this woreda is distributed amongst 83.57% owning their land, 9.83% renting, and 6.62% under other forms of tenure.

== 2020 woreda reorganisation ==
As of 2020, woreda Naeder Adet's territory belongs to the following new woredas:

- Naeder woreda
- Adet woreda
