= Taunsa =

Village in Afar Region, Ethiopia

Taunsa ታውንሳ (Tigrinya)
- Regional capital and special zone
- Location within Ethiopia
- Coordinates: 13°12′49″N 39°52′37″E
- Country: Ethiopia
- Region: Afar
- District: Megale
- Time zone: UTC+3 (EAT)
- Climate: Cold semi-arid

Taunsa (Amharic and Tigrinya: ታውንሳ; also spelled Tonsa) is a ward (administrative unit) in the Megale district of the Afar Region in Ethiopia, located near the border with the Tigray Region.

The town has witnessed clashes between the Ethiopian government of Abiy Ahmed and Tigray People's Liberation Front (TPLF) during the Ethiopian civil war.
