= Adwa (woreda) =

District in Tigray Region, Ethiopia

Coordinates: 14°15′N 38°55′E

Adwa ዓድዋ
- Woreda
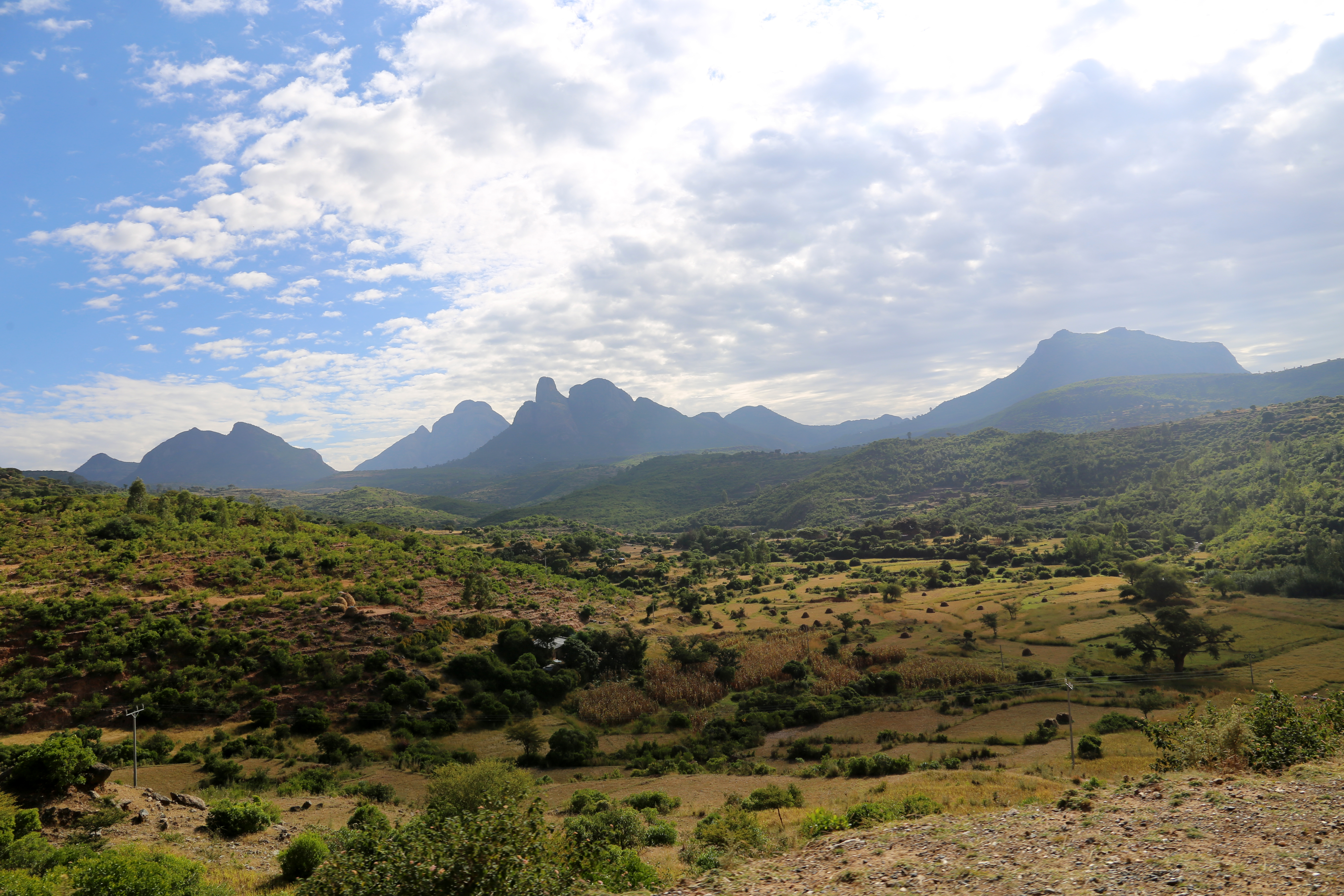

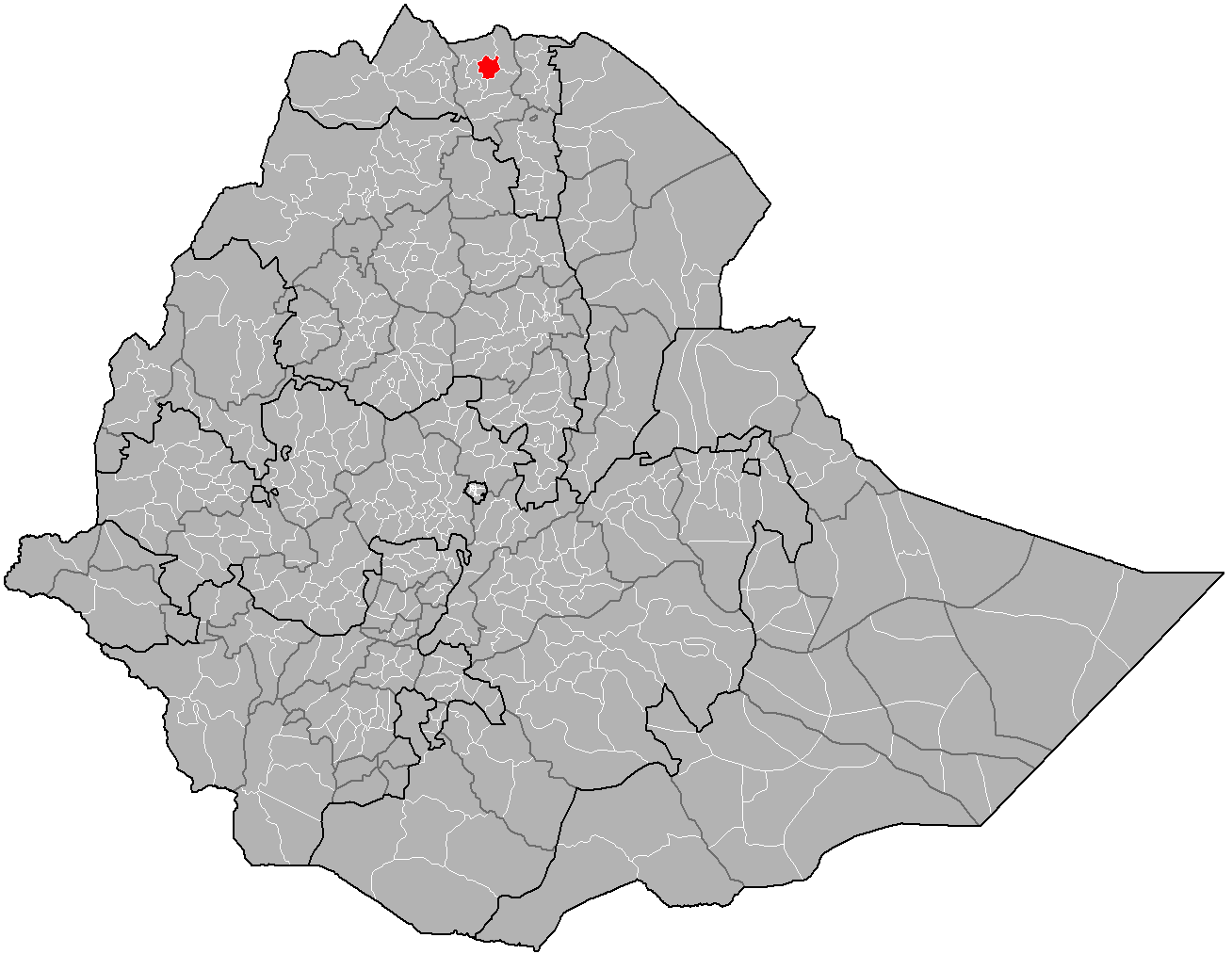
- Country: Ethiopia
- Region: Tigray
- Zone: Maekelay (Central)

Area
  - Total: 1,888.60 km^{2} (729.19 sq mi)

Population (2007)
  - Total: 99,711

Adwa (Tigrinya: ዓድዋ) is a woreda in Tigray Region, Ethiopia. Part of the Maekelay Zone, Adwa is bordered on the south by Werie Leké, on the west by La'ilay Maychew, on the north by Mereb Leké, and on the east by Enticho. Town of Adwa is surrounded by Adwa woreda.

== Overview ==
High points in this woreda include Mount Soloda (2484 meters); rivers include the Assam. Notable landmarks include the village of Fremona, which was the base of the 16th century Jesuits sent to convert Ethiopia to Roman Catholicism, and Abba Garima Monastery which dates to the 6th century.

Ethiopian Electric Power announced that it would provide 24-hour electrical service to five towns in Adwa, La'ilay Maychew and Naeder Adet woredas, reaching a total of 100,000 new clients in all of the woredas. This new service was planned to begin in June, 2007.

== Demographics ==
Based on the 2007 national census conducted by the Central Statistical Agency of Ethiopia (CSA), this woreda has a total population of 99,711, an increase of 17.74% over the 1994 census, of whom 49,546 are men and 50,165 women; no urban inhabitants were counted in this woreda. With an area of 1,888.60 square kilometers, Adwa has a population density of 52.80, which is less than the Zone average of 56.29 persons per square kilometer. A total of 20,141 households were counted in this woreda, resulting in an average of 4.95 persons to a household, and 19,525 housing units. The majority of the inhabitants said they practiced Ethiopian Orthodox Christianity, with 99.3% reporting that as their religion.

The 1994 national census reported a total population for this woreda of 109,203, of whom 53,324 were men and 55,879 were women; 24,519 or 22.45% of its population were urban dwellers. The largest ethnic group reported in Adwa was the Tigrayan (99.53%). Tigrinya was spoken as a first language by 99.56%. The majority of the population practiced Ethiopian Orthodox Christianity, with 96.4% of the population reporting that belief, while 3.43% were Muslim. Concerning education, 25.33% of the population were considered literate, which is more than the Zone average of 14.21%; 34.92% of children aged 7–12 were in primary school; 5.7% of the children aged 13–14 were in junior secondary school, and 8.99% of the inhabitants aged 15–18 were in senior secondary school. Concerning sanitary conditions, about 65% of the urban houses and 24% of all houses had access to safe drinking water at the time of the census; 31% of the urban and 10% of the total had toilet facilities.

== Agriculture ==
A sample enumeration performed by the CSA in 2001 interviewed 23,613 farmers in this woreda, who held an average of 0.56 hectares of land. Of the 13,149 hectares of private land surveyed, 89.75% was in cultivation, 1.51% pasture, 3.22% fallow, 0.56% woodland, and 4.98% was devoted to other uses. For the land under cultivation in this woreda, 80.64% was planted in cereals, 7.48% in pulses, 0.61% in oilseeds, and 0.14% in vegetables. Fifteen hectares were planted in fruit trees and 47 in gesho. 78.71% of the farmers both raised crops and livestock, while 20.76% only grew crops and 0.54% only raised livestock. Land tenure in this woreda is distributed amongst 92.25% owning their land, and 6.97% renting; the percentage reported as holding their land under other forms of tenure is missing.
