= Gondrand =

Freight forwarding and logistics company

Gondrand International Ltd., Member of Nordic Transport Group A/S
- Founded: 1866
- Headquarters: Basel, Switzerland
- Services: Land transports, Sea freight, Air freight, Logistics, Supply Chain Management, Customs Management
- Number of employees: 650 (2017)
- Website: www.gondrand-logistics.com/ www.ntg.dk

The Gondrand Group, a member of Nordic Transport Group (NTG), a leading transport group headquartered in Denmark, is an international freight forwarding and logistics provider for land transports, sea freight, air freight and contract logistics.

== Worldwide locations ==
Over 100 branches in 26 countries:

- China
- Czech Republic
- Germany
- Hong Kong
- Hungary
- Italy
- Netherlands
- Switzerland
- Denmark
- Sweden
- Finland
- Norway
- Estonia
- Latvia
- Lithuania
- Poland
- Belgium
- Slovakia
- Turkey
- Bulgaria
- Russia
- Kazakhstan
- Belarus
- Ukraine
- Thailand
- USA
