= Adwa =

Town in Tigray Region, Ethiopia

Adwa ዓድዋ Aduwa
- Town
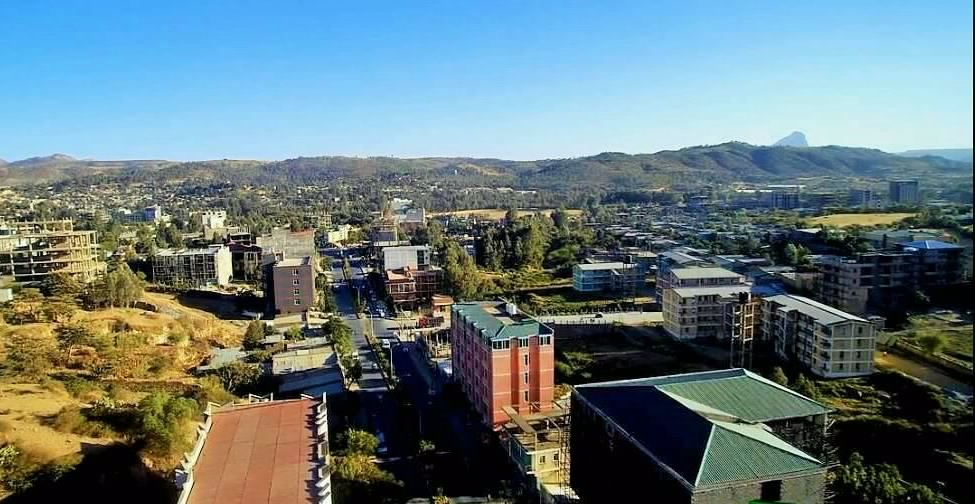
- City of Adwa

- Location within Ethiopia Location within the Horn of Africa Location within Africa
- Coordinates: 14°10′N 38°54′E
- Country: Ethiopia
- Region: Tigray
- Zone: Maekelay (Central)
- Elevation: 1,907 m (6,257 ft)

Population (2007 Census)
  - Total: 40,500
  - Estimate (2024): 114,069
- Time zone: UTC+3 (EAT)

Adwa (Tigrinya: ዓድዋ; Amharic: ዐድዋ; Arabic: عدوة also spelled Adowa or Aduwa) is a town and separate woreda in Tigray Region, Ethiopia. It is best known as the community closest to the site of the 1896 Battle of Adwa, in which Ethiopian soldiers defeated Italian troops, thus being one of the few African nations to directly thwart European colonialism. Located in the Central Zone of the Tigray Region, Adwa has a longitude and latitude of 14°10′N 38°54′E, and an elevation of 1907 meters. Adwa is surrounded by Adwa woreda.

Adwa is home to several notable churches: Adwa Enda-Gebri'el (built by Dejazmach Wolde Gebriel), Adwa Enda-Maryam (built by Ras Anda Haymanot), Adwa Edna-Medhane`Alem (built by Ras Sabagadis), Adwa Nigiste-Saba /Queen of Sheba secondary school, and Adwa Enda-Selasse. Near Adwa is Abba Garima Monastery, founded in the sixth century by one of the Nine Saints and known for its 10th-century gospels. Also nearby is the village of Fremona, which had been the base of the 16th-century Jesuits sent to convert Ethiopia to Catholicism.

== Geography ==
=== Climate ===
Climate data for Adwa, elevation 1,980 m (6,500 ft)
Month	Jan	Feb	Mar	Apr	May	Jun	Jul	Aug	Sep	Oct	Nov	Dec	Year
Mean daily maximum °C (°F)	26.2 (79.2)	27.5 (81.5)	29.2 (84.6)	30.1 (86.2)	29.7 (85.5)	26.7 (80.1)	23.3 (73.9)	23.2 (73.8)	25.2 (77.4)	27.2 (81.0)	28.2 (82.8)	26.7 (80.1)	26.9 (80.5)
Daily mean °C (°F)	16.7 (62.1)	17.7 (63.9)	20.3 (68.5)	21.7 (71.1)	21.8 (71.2)	20.2 (68.4)	18.3 (64.9)	18.8 (65.8)	18.7 (65.7)	18.6 (65.5)	18.2 (64.8)	16.7 (62.1)	19.0 (66.2)
Mean daily minimum °C (°F)	7.4 (45.3)	8.0 (46.4)	11.5 (52.7)	13.3 (55.9)	13.8 (56.8)	13.6 (56.5)	13.3 (55.9)	14.6 (58.3)	12.1 (53.8)	9.8 (49.6)	8.1 (46.6)	6.5 (43.7)	11.0 (51.8)
Average precipitation mm (inches)	1 (0.0)	3 (0.1)	13 (0.5)	25 (1.0)	29 (1.1)	83 (3.3)	215 (8.5)	224 (8.8)	117 (4.6)	27 (1.1)	5 (0.2)	0 (0)	742 (29.2)
Average relative humidity (%)	53	49	47	51	48	49	79	80	60	60	65	61	59
Source: FAO

== History ==
=== Origins ===
According to Richard Pankhurst, Adwa derives its name from Adi Awa (or Wa), "village of the Awa". The Awa are a tribe that was mentioned in the anonymous Monumentum Adulitanum that once stood at Adulis.

Francisco Alvares records that the Portuguese diplomatic mission passed Adwa, which he called "Houses of St. Michael", in August 1520.

=== 18th century ===
By 1700, it had become the residence for the governor of Tigray province and grew to overshadow Debarwa, the traditional seat of the Bahr Negash, as the most important town in northern Ethiopia. Its market was important enough to need a Nagadras. The earliest known person to hold this office was the Greek immigrant Janni of Adwa, a brother of Petros, chamberlain to Emperor Iyoas I. Adwa was home to a small colony of Greek merchants into the 19th century.

Adwa acquired major importance due to the establishment of a permanent capital at Gondar. As the traveler James Bruce noted, Adwa was situated on a piece of "flat ground through which every body must go in their way from Gondar to the Red Sea". The person who controlled this plain could levy profitable tolls on the caravans which passed through.

=== 19th century ===
Because of its location on this major trade route, it is mentioned in the memoirs of numerous 19th-century Europeans visiting Ethiopia. These include Arnaud and Antoine d'Abbadie, Henry Salt, Samuel Gobat, Mansfield Parkyns and Théophile Lefebvre. After the defeat and death of Ras Sabagadis in the Battle of Debre Abbay, its inhabitants fled Adwa for safety. The town was briefly held by Emperor Tewodros II in January 1860, who had marched from the south in response to the rebellion of Agew Neguse, who had burned then fled the town.

After the departure of Tewodros, the town was seized in 1865 by another nobleman, Wagshum Gobaze, who soon claimed the title of Emperor under the name Tekle Giyorgis II. He was subsequently defeated by a rival, Yohannes IV, in a battle fought just outside the town in 1871.

Giacomo Naretti passed through Adwa in March 1879, after it had been devastated by a typhus epidemic. It had been reduced to a shadow of itself, having about 200 inhabitants.

Adwa was most notably the site of the final battle of the First Italo-Ethiopian War, where the Ethiopian Emperor Menelik II fought to defend Ethiopia's independence against Italy in 1896. The town and its environs suffered considerable damage during the fighting. After his visit to the town in 1897, the British journalist Augustus B. Wylde relates that "Wandering about Adowa was a sad business, many of the streets were entirely deserted, the Mahomedan quarter was tenantless and the houses with the exception of two or three were unroofed and in ruins."

=== 20th century ===
The Asmara-Addis Ababa telegraph line, constructed by the Italians in 1902-1904, passed through Adwa and had an office there. By 1905 it was considered the third-largest town in Tigray. Telephone service reached Adwa by 1935, but no phone numbers are listed for the town in 1954.

On 6 October 1935, Italian forces entered Adwa after two days of bombardment shocked Ras Seyoum Mengesha into a hasty retreat—abandoning large stocks of food and other supplies. The Italian Gavinana Division brought with them a stone monument in honor of the Italian soldiers who had fallen in 1896. This monument was erected immediately after their arrival and inaugurated on 15 October in the presence of General Emilio De Bono. The town had passed from Italian hands before 12 June 1941, when the newly arrived 34th Indian State Force Brigade set up a post office there.

During the Woyane rebellion, 600 territorial troops retreated to Adwa on 22 September 1943. By 1958 Adwa was one of 27 places in Ethiopia ranked as First Class Township. During the 1960s the town was not only an educational center but also an early focus for Tigrayan nationalist dissent, indicated by the fact that all three of the leaders of the Tigrayan People's Liberation Front (TPLF) over the 22-year period from 1975 to 1997, Aregawi Berhe, Sebhat Nega, and Meles Zenawi, all came from Adwa and attended the town's government school.

Adwa was a frequent target of attacks by the TPLF during the Ethiopian Civil War: in 1978 the TPLF attacked Adwa; in 1979 they unsuccessfully tried to rob the bank. The town was seized by the TPLF in March 1988 before being recaptured by the Ethiopian 604th Army Corps in June 1988. After the Battle of Shire, the town would permanently fall under the control of the TPLF by the end of February 1989. On 23 June 1990, Adwa was bombed from the air by the Ethiopian Air Force; one person was wounded but no fatalities were reported.

=== 21st century ===
During the Tigray War, Adwa was seized by the Ethiopian National Defense Force (ENDF) on 24 November 2020, it was recaptured by the TPLF in June 2021.

== Demographic evolution ==
Based on the 2007 national census conducted by the Central Statistical Agency of Ethiopia (CSA), this town has a total population of 40,500, of whom 18,307 are men and 22,193 women. The majority of the inhabitants said they practiced Ethiopian Orthodox Christianity, with 90.27% reporting that as their religion, while 9.01% of the population were Muslim. In 2025, Adwa is one of the urban areas with more than 100,000 inhabitants in Ethiopia.

== Sports ==
=== Football ===
Soloda-Adwa was one of the six sides that secured promotion to the Super League in 2019. Almeda Textile Football Club (ALTEX) was promoted to the Ethiopian National Football League after winning the Ethiopian football club championships held in Mekelle. ALTEX is the first club from Adwa town to represent the town in Ethiopian association football history. It is a prominent Ethiopian football team renowned for its passionate play and deep-rooted connection to the Adwa region. Established with a vision to elevate Ethiopian football. The team is known for its disciplined defense, dynamic midfield, and spirited attacking style, which resonates with the resilience and determination of the Adwa community.

== Films ==
- Adwa - An African Victory (1999). Directed by Haile Gerima

== Notable people ==
- Kinfe Abraham, academic and politician.
- Gebrehiwot Baykedagn, economist, statesman and political theorist, one of the prominent reformist intellectuals of the early 20th-century Ethiopia.
- Tewolde Berhan Gebre Egziabher, scientist and environmentalist. Recipient of the UN Champions of the Earth Environmental Award
- Sebhat Guèbrè-Egziabhér, writer.
- Abune Paulos, patriarch of the Ethiopian Orthodox Tewahedo Church.
- Fisseha Desta, Vice President
- Abuna Yesehaq, leader of the Ethiopian Orthodox Tewahedo Church in the Western hemisphere.
- Meles Zenawi, Prime Minister.
- Berhane Meskel Reda

== See also ==
- Battle of Adwa
