= Addi Abagiè =

Lake in the Tigray Region of Ethiopia

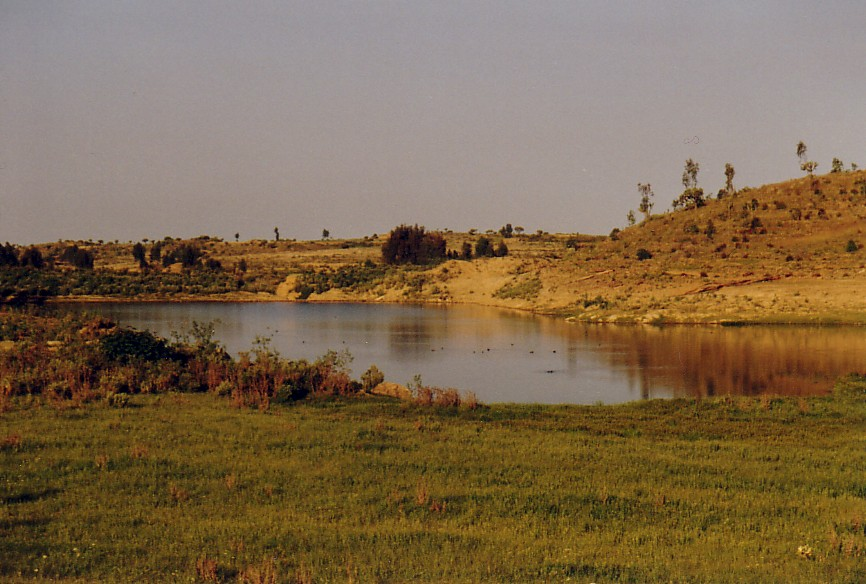

- Location within Ethiopia
- Coordinates: 13.93280779°N 39.59291565°E
- Type: Freshwater artificial lake
- Basin countries: Ethiopia
- Surface elevation: 2,410 m (7,910 ft)
- Settlements: Sinkata

Addi Abagiè is a reservoir located in the Sa’isi Tsa’ida Imba woreda of the Tigray Region in Ethiopia. The earthen dam that holds the reservoir was built in 1993.

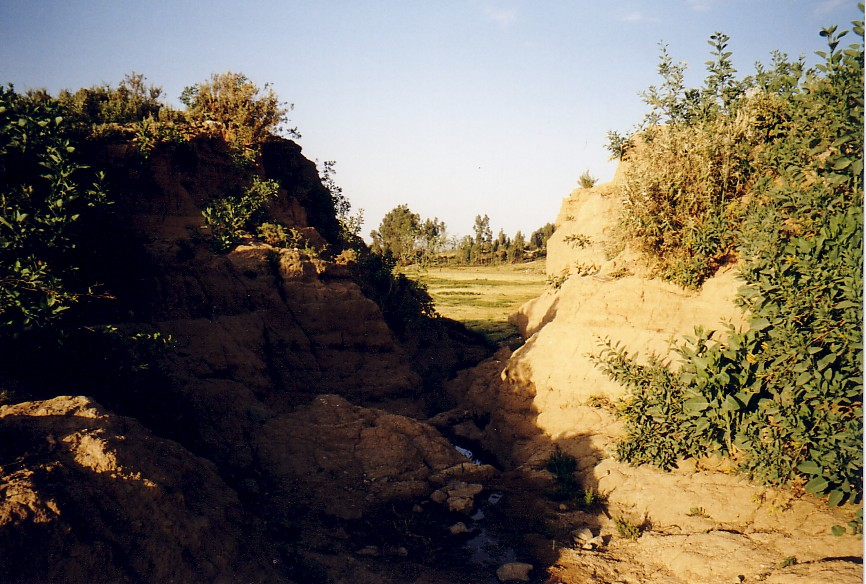
Breach in Addi Abagiè dam in 2001

== Dam characteristics ==
Dam crest length: 176 metres. Exceptionally, among the many dams in Tigray, this dam was breached around the year 2000, due to high positioning of the spillway and hence overtopping of the dam. Around 2010 the breach was closed and the dam height increased. The dam is now operational.

== Environment ==
The catchment of the reservoir is 8.77 km^{2} large, with a perimeter of 13 km and a length of 4700 metres. The reservoir suffers from rapid siltation. The lithology of the catchment is Enticho Sandstone and Precambrian metamorphic rocks.
