= Irob =

Irob (ኢሮብ) may refer to:

- Irob people, an ethnic group of Ethiopia
- Irob (woreda), a district in Ethiopia named after the people
- Rob (TV series), ¡Rob!, television series
