= Idaga Hamus (Saesi Tsaedaemba) =

Town in Ethiopia

Idaga Hamus Edaga Hamus (Thursday Market) Sewha Sa'isi'e
- Town
- Location within Ethiopia Location within the Horn of Africa Location within Africa
- Coordinates: 14°11′N 39°34′E
- Country: Ethiopia
- Region: Tigray
- Zone: Misraqawi Zone
- Woreda: Saesi Tsaedaemba
- Elevation: 2,700 m (8,900 ft)

Population (2005)
  - Total: 8,474

Idaga Hamus (also called Edaga Hamus and Sewha Sa'isi'e) is a town in the Saesi Tsaedaemba woreda of the Misraqawi Zone of the Tigray Region of Ethiopia. It is located 97 kilometers north of Mekelle on "National Road 1" (now Ethiopian Highway 2), between Freweyni and Adigrat.

== Geology and soils ==
The following geological formations are present in this locality:

- Adigrat Sandstone
- Enticho Sandstone

The main geomorphic units, with corresponding soil types are:

- Enticho Sandstone plateau
  - Associated soil types
    - shallow sandy soils with an indurated layer which prevents rooting and drainage (Petric Plinthosol)
    - moderately deep, (light) brown, loamy to loamy sandy soil (Chromic Cambisol, Arenic Luvisol, Arenic Lixisol)
  - Inclusions
    - complex of rock outcrops, very stony and very shallow soils ((Lithic) Leptosol)
    - shallow, stony, dark greyish brown clay loams and sandy loams (Eutric Regosol and Cambisol)
    - clays of floodplains with very high watertable with moderate to good natural fertility (Eutric Gleysol, Gleyic Cambisol)
- Idaga Hamus highlands
  - Associated soil types
    - shallow, very stony, silt loamy to loamy soils (Skeletic Cambisol, Leptic Cambisol, Skeletic Regosol)
    - shallow, stony, dark greyish brown clay loams and sandy loams (Eutric Regosol and Cambisol)
    - sandy clay loams to sands developed on sandy colluvium (Eutric Arenosol, Regosol, Cambisol)
  - Inclusions
    - complex of rock outcrops, very stony and very shallow soils ((Lithic) Leptosol)
    - Deep dark cracking clays with very good natural fertility, waterlogged during the wet season (Chromic Vertisol, Pellic Vertisol)
    - moderately deep, brown silty loamy to loamy soils (Eutric Luvisol)

== Monuments ==
A number of rock-hewn churches have been reported near this town include: Debre Zakarios Giyorgis and Cherqos, a collapsed one at Dengelat, Guwahigot Yesus and Yohannes. The contemporary church of Maryam Techot in this town is located on the top of a stepped Aksumite platform about 2 meters high and with dressed-stone corner blocks. A monolithic pillar and other carved fragments in the area may have been salvaged from the Aksumite structure which originally stood on this platform.

== History ==
Records at the Nordic Africa Institute website provide details of the primary school in 1968.

Idaga Hamus sheltered a significant number of refugees during the Eritrean-Ethiopian War of 1998-2000.

== Demographics ==
Based on figures from the Central Statistical Agency in 2005, Idaga Hamus has an estimated total population of 8,474 of whom 3,962 are men and 4,512 are women. The 1994 census reported it had a total population of 4,883 of whom 2,110 were males and 2,773 were females. Together with Freweyni, it is one larger settlements in Saesi Tsaedaemba woreda.
