= Tesfay Debessay =

Ethiopian political activist

Tesfaye Debessay
- Tigrinya: ተስፋይ ደበሳይ; Amharic: ተስፋዬ ደበሳይ

Secretary of the Ethiopian People's Revolutionary Party
- In office August 1975 – March 1977
- Preceded by: Office established

Personal details
- Born: 1941 Alitena, Agame, Tigray Province, Ethiopian Empire
- Died: March 1977 (aged 35–36) Addis Ababa, Ethiopia
- Party: Ethiopian People's Revolutionary Party

Tesfaye Debessay (Tigrinya: ተስፋይ ደበሳይ, romanized: Täsfay Däbässay; Amharic: ተስፋዬ ደበሳይ, romanized: Täsfayä Däbässay; 1941 – March 1977), was an Ethiopian political activist and one of the founding leaders of the Ethiopian People's Revolutionary Party (EPRP). He was a member of the organization's early Central Committee and Politburo and was appointed party secretary after it publicly adopted the EPRP name in 1975.

Born into an Irob family in Agame, Debessay belonged to what historian Bahru Zewde describes as the first generation of student activists of Tigrayan origin who adopted a pan-Ethiopian approach to the country's political problems and played a prominent role in the emergence of multi-ethnic left-wing organizations.

== Early life and education ==
Debessay was born in 1941 in Alitena, in the Irob district of Agame in eastern Tigray Province. A commemorative biography produced by the Ya Tewlid Foundation describes him as having been born into a poor Irob farming family.

According to the same biography, he received part of his education through Catholic institutions before continuing his studies in Italy, where he studied philosophy in Rome. He subsequently returned to Ethiopia and was involved in professional and academic work before becoming increasingly active in the Ethiopian student and revolutionary movements.

== Political activity ==
Debessay became involved with Ethiopian student activists in Europe during the period in which elements of the Ethiopian Student Movement were moving toward the creation of clandestine Marxist political organizations. He participated in the congress held in West Berlin in April 1972 at which the Ethiopian People's Liberation Organization (EPLO), the precursor of the EPRP, was organized. (Note: The Encyclopaedia Aethiopica and Bahru Zewde's 2010 oral-history volume date the congress to April 1972. Bahru's later 2014 monograph dates the formal founding congress to April 1973.)

Participants elected a Central Committee that included Berhane Meskel Reda, Tesfaye Debessay, Zer'u Kishen, Kiflu Tadesse, Eyasu Alemayehu, Kiflu Teferra and Desta Tadesse. The Central Committee subsequently elected Debessay, Berhane Meskel, Zer'u, Kiflu Tadesse and Eyasu Alemayehu to the Politburo. Debessay was initially placed in charge of the party organization in Western Europe.

The organization also considered the Ad Irob district of northeastern Tigray as a possible base for rural armed struggle. According to testimony reproduced in Bahru Zewde's oral history of the student movement, Debessay's familiarity with the region was one of the considerations behind the choice, while Irob recruits familiar with the area had also been recruited in Rome.

Bahru Zewde groups Debessay with Abbay Abraha, Berhane Meskel Reda and Zer'u Kishen as a first generation of political activists of Tigrayan origin who became prominent in pan-Ethiopian leftist organizations. Three members of the early EPRP Politburo—Berhane Meskel, Debessay and Zer'u—were from Tigray. Zewde contrasts their approach, which interpreted problems in Tigray primarily within a wider Ethiopian class struggle, with the subsequent generation of activists who established the Tigray People's Liberation Front (TPLF).

== EPRP leadership ==
The EPLO remained clandestine during the early 1970s. Following the Ethiopian Revolution of 1974, the organization increasingly opposed the military government of the Derg and called for the establishment of a provisional popular government.

The organization publicly adopted the name Ethiopian People's Revolutionary Party in August 1975, following a party conference held the previous month. According to the Encyclopaedia Aethiopica, the accompanying leadership changes included the appointment of Debessay as "party secretary".

The EPRP was divided over political and military strategy, particularly the relative emphasis to be placed on protracted rural warfare and armed struggle in the cities. The party began a rural armed campaign in 1975 and moved toward urban armed struggle during 1976. The conflict between the EPRP and the Derg intensified in 1976 and 1977, alongside the EPRP's rivalry with the pro-Derg All-Ethiopia Socialist Movement (MEISON). The Derg subsequently launched the campaign of political repression known as the Red Terror, which severely weakened the EPRP in Ethiopia's urban centres.

== Death ==
Debessay died in Addis Ababa in March 1977 during the Derg's campaign against the EPRP. Accounts of the precise circumstances differ. EPRP accounts state that security forces located him while he was operating clandestinely in the capital and that a firefight followed. According to these accounts, after being wounded and facing capture, Debessay jumped from an upper floor of the building in which he had taken refuge and died from the fall.

His death occurred during the escalation of the Red Terror, in which large numbers of EPRP members and suspected supporters were arrested or killed. The organization was subsequently largely destroyed in Ethiopia's major cities and was also driven from its principal rural positions in Tigray by the TPLF.

== Political context and significance ==
Debessay's career illustrates the divergent political trajectories that emerged among Tigrayan student activists during the revolutionary period. Bahru Zewde distinguishes Debessay and other early EPRP leaders from the slightly younger generation that created the TPLF: while the former sought to address regional and national grievances through a multi-ethnic, pan-Ethiopian revolutionary organization and class struggle, the latter gave priority to the specific political grievances of Tigray and organized along ethno-national lines.
