= Sinkata =

Sinkata (sometimes Senkata) may refer to:

- Freweyni, previously named Sinkata, a town in the Ethiopian Tigray region
- the tabia of Sinkata, located south of this town
