= Goda massacre =

Massacre at Goda glass factory, Eastern Tigray as part of Tigray war

Coordinates: 14.21018°N 39.54866°E

- Part of Tigray War
- Location of Goda Bottle and Glass Share Company in Ethiopia
- Location: Goda Bottle and Glass Share Company near Idaga Hamus, Tigray Region, Ethiopia
- Date: 2 December 2020
- Target: Tigrayan youth
- Attack type: Mass killing; Ethnic cleansing
- Deaths: 20 civilians
- Perpetrator: (Eritrea) Eritrean Defence Forces

The Goda massacre was a mass extrajudicial killing that took place at the Goda Bottle and Glass Share Company in Gu'iguna (Tigrinya: ጒዕጉና) in the Tigray Region of Ethiopia during the Tigray War, on 2 December 2020. Gu'iguna is a hamlet just north of Idaga Hamus town, Eastern zone of Tigray.

== Massacre ==
The Eritrean Defence Forces (EDF) killed 19 youngsters and an old man at the Goda Bottle and Glass Share Company (Eastern Tigray) on 2 December 2020. Soon after occupying Idaga Hamus, the Eritrean army started looting the glass factory. On 2 December, 17 teenagers and young men, mostly relatives, were taken from Sasun Betehawariyat, near Idaga Hamus, by EDF soldiers to help to loot the Goda Bottle factory, further up along the road in Gu'iguna. Teame Hagos and Negasi Berihu tried to escape and were immediately shot dead. The other 15 were executed in the evening of 2 December. After transporting the heavy machinery out of the factory, the EDF withdrew on 31 December and the families of the victims could recover the bodies (the 17 youngsters and additional three bodies) and hold a formal gathering for mourning.

Typical massacres committed by Ethiopian and Eritrean soldiers in the Tigray war are (1) revenge when they lose a battle; (2) to terrorise and extract information about whereabouts of TPLF leaders; (3) murder of suspected family members of TDF fighters; and (4) terrorising the Tigray society as a whole such as in case of mass killings in churches. The Goda massacre is part of the fourth category.

== Perpetrators ==
Relatives and other villagers interpreted the identity of the perpetrators as Eritrean soldiers – the village elders met the Eritrean commander to negotiate the recovery of the corpses of the victims.

== Victims ==
The “Tigray: Atlas of the humanitarian situation” mentions 20 victims, 19 of which have been identified.

Early January 2021, based on travellers' accounts, Jan Nyssen mentioned that around 1–14 December, 13 boys from Tokot village near Idaga Hamus, aged 12–15, were forced to help EDF soldiers in loading a truck and were then executed. The conditions are very similar with those of the Goda massacre, and it seems to be one event.

== Reactions ==
The looting of the Goda factory is mentioned in several media articles. Goda was also visited by NPR journalist Eyder Peralty, as well as Tigrai TV, who interviewed relatives and saw the mass graves of the victims.

After months of denial by the Ethiopian authorities that massacres occurred during the Tigray War, a joint investigation by OHCHR and the Ethiopian Human Rights Commission was announced in March 2021.

While the Ethiopian government promised that Eritrean troops will be pulled out from Tigray, the Eritrean government denies any participation in warfare in Tigray, let alone in massacres.
