= Irob people =

Ethnic group native to Eritrea and Ethiopia

Irob
ኢሮብ (Tigrinya) ʿIroob (Saho)
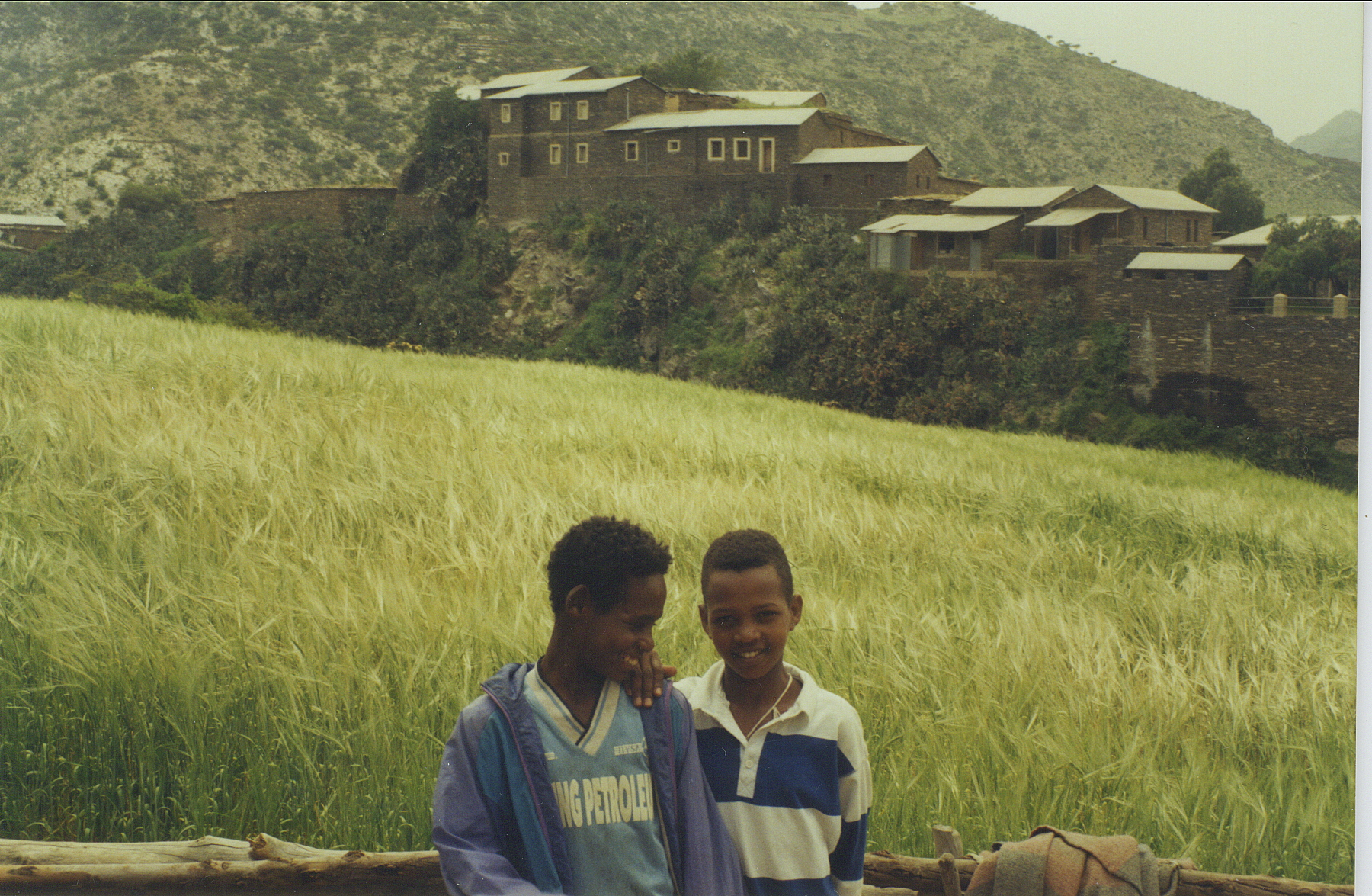
- Irob boys near Alitena

Regions with significant populations
- Ethiopia: 35,000-50,000 (2007)

Languages
- Saho, Tigrinya

Religion
- Significant Majority: Catholicism; Minority: Tewahedo Orthodoxy

Related ethnic groups
- • Cushitic peoples (Saho, Afar, Somalis) • Habesha (Tigrayans, Tigrinya, Amhara) • Tigre

The Irob people (Geʽez: ኢሮብ ʾirōb, also spelled Erob) are an ethnic group who live in a predominantly highland, mountainous area by the same name in Eritrea and Ethiopia. They speak the Saho language. Most of them profess the Catholic religion and are mostly farmers. The etymology of the name Irob is debatable, but Irob's elders say that the term comes from the Saho word "Oroba", which means "welcome to our home". The boundaries of Irobland are, to an extent, identical to the Irob woreda; both are bordered by the following areas: Dabri-Mela to the north, Hado to the east, the Afar Region to the east and south, Shoumezana and Gulomakeda to the west, and Saesi Tsaedaemba to the south. The first two neighbors are Saho speakers and predominantly Muslim, the third are Muslim Afars, and the others are Tigrigna-speaking Christians.

== History ==
The capital (traditional center) of Irob is Alitena. Irobs trace their lineage to one man, Summe, son of Neguse Worede-Mehret, who according to the Irob oral history, migrated to the Irobland from Tsira'e in Kilite Awla'elo, a part of Tigray, about 700 years ago.

Despite their relatively small population, the Irob have been at the forefront of regional and national politics in Ethiopia. Starting with the Zemene Mesafint, the Irob family of Shum Agame Woldu dominated Tigrayan politics. The dynasty included Dejazmach Subagadis (whose rule extended to present-day Eritrea), Shum Agame Desta, Ras Sebhat Aregawi, and many others including Emperor Yohannes IV.

During the Italian invasion, Irob patriots, led by individuals such as Dejazmach Ayele Sebhat and Dejazmach Kassa Sebhat, contributed to the anti-Italian resistance movement from their base on Mount Asimba.

In more recent times, many Irobs, such as Dr. Tesfay Debessay, who was a leader of the Ethiopian People's Revolutionary Party (EPRP), played an important role in the struggle waged against the dictatorial junta led by Colonel Mengistu Haile Mariam.

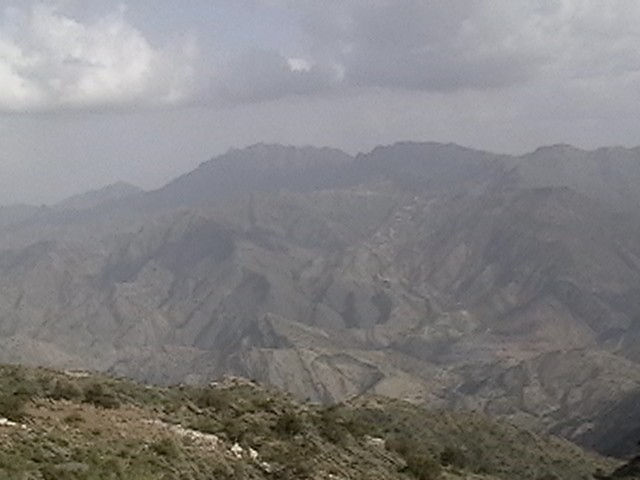
Mount Assimba from a distance.

Moreover, the Irobland proper, particularly around the Assimba and Aiga localities, served as a base for several Ethiopian revolutionary movements, including EPRP and the Tigray People's Liberation Front (TPLF). Aiga is also the location of significant battles during the Ethio-Eritrean border war (1998–2000), which ultimately led to the removal of occupying Eritrean forces from the region.

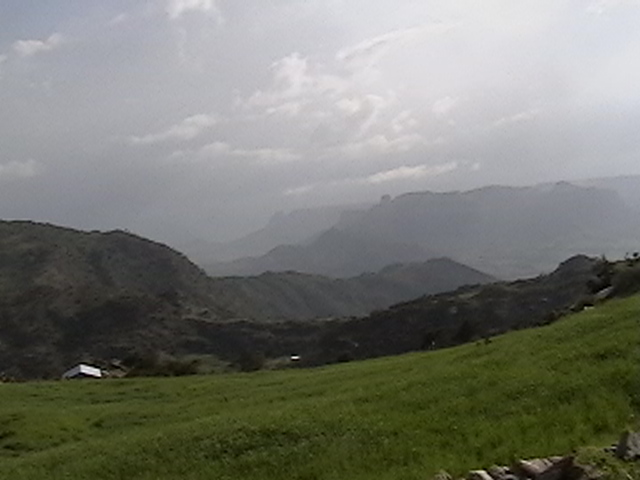
Aiga Village.

In early January 2021 during the Tigray War at least 52 civilians (50 men, 2 women) were extrajudicially killed in Irob by Eritrean soldiers, according to the Irob Advocacy Association, which prepared a list of the victims' names.

Tigrai TV reported 13 victims, members of the same family thrown in a river coloured red; relatives were denied to bury the bodies and mourn.

== Lifestyle and culture ==
The Irob are divided into three major subgroups or Are (Houses): Adgadi-Are, Buknaiti-Are and Hasaballa. The Adgadi-Are and Hasaballa are predominantly Orthodox Christians, while Bouknaiti-Are consists of Catholics.

The Irob economy is primarily based on agriculture, including animal husbandry. The region is also renowned for its excellent honey. In fact, the Miess /Tej or local "Beer"(honey-wine) made from the honey is praised throughout the region for its quality.

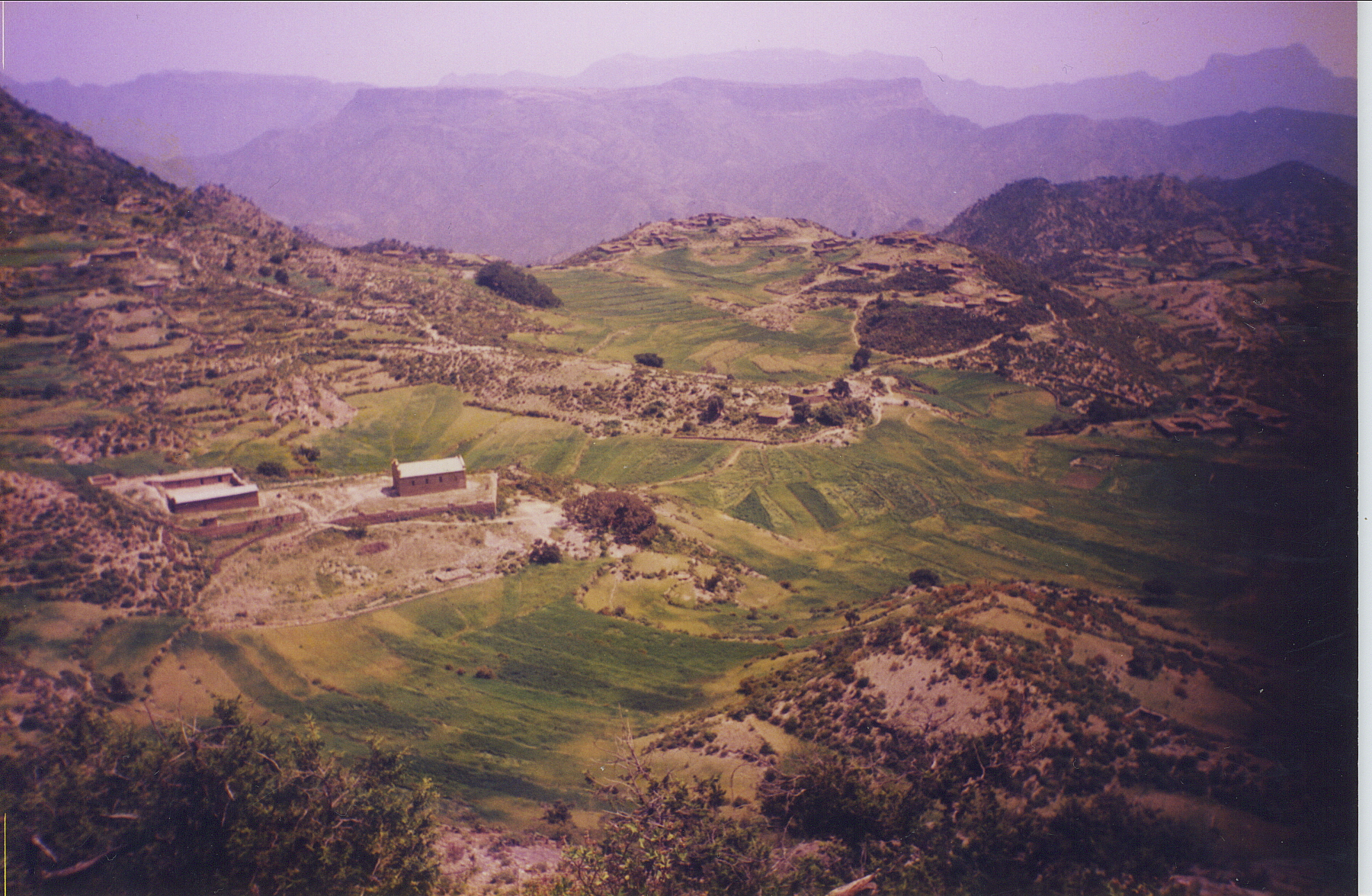
Kafna Village.

In general, the Irob is a bicultural community. With their Saho-speaking neighbors, they share a common language and certain social structures, such as a clan division system called Mela, and the title Ona for their regional leaders. Many other cultural practices, including wedding ceremonies, dress, dance, and food; however, are more similar to their Tigrigna-speaking neighbors specially with the peoples of Agame.

Irobs also have distinctive customs. For example, they have an elaborate poetry-telling tradition called Adar. The Irob men have a dance/step routine called Hora and Alkafo, which was traditionally performed in preparation for battles and is still commonly displayed during weddings and other ceremonies.

== See also ==
- Irob (woreda)
- Agame
- Saho people
