= Yemane Senior Secondary School =

Yemane Senior Secondary School is a school located in Fatsi, Gulomakeda woreda, Tigray Region, Ethiopia. It is one of two preparatory schools in Gulomakeda (ጙሎማከዳ), the other being Zalambessa Senior Secondary School.

== History ==
In 2018, 92 grade eleven students at Yemane Senior Secondary School were participants in a study about the "Effects of Integrated Reading-and-Writing Practice on EFL Learners’ Perceived Efficacy of Reading and Writing".
