= Irob (woreda) =

Coordinates: 14°32′N 39°38′E

Irob ኢሮብ
- District (Amharic: ወረዳ; Oromo: woreda)
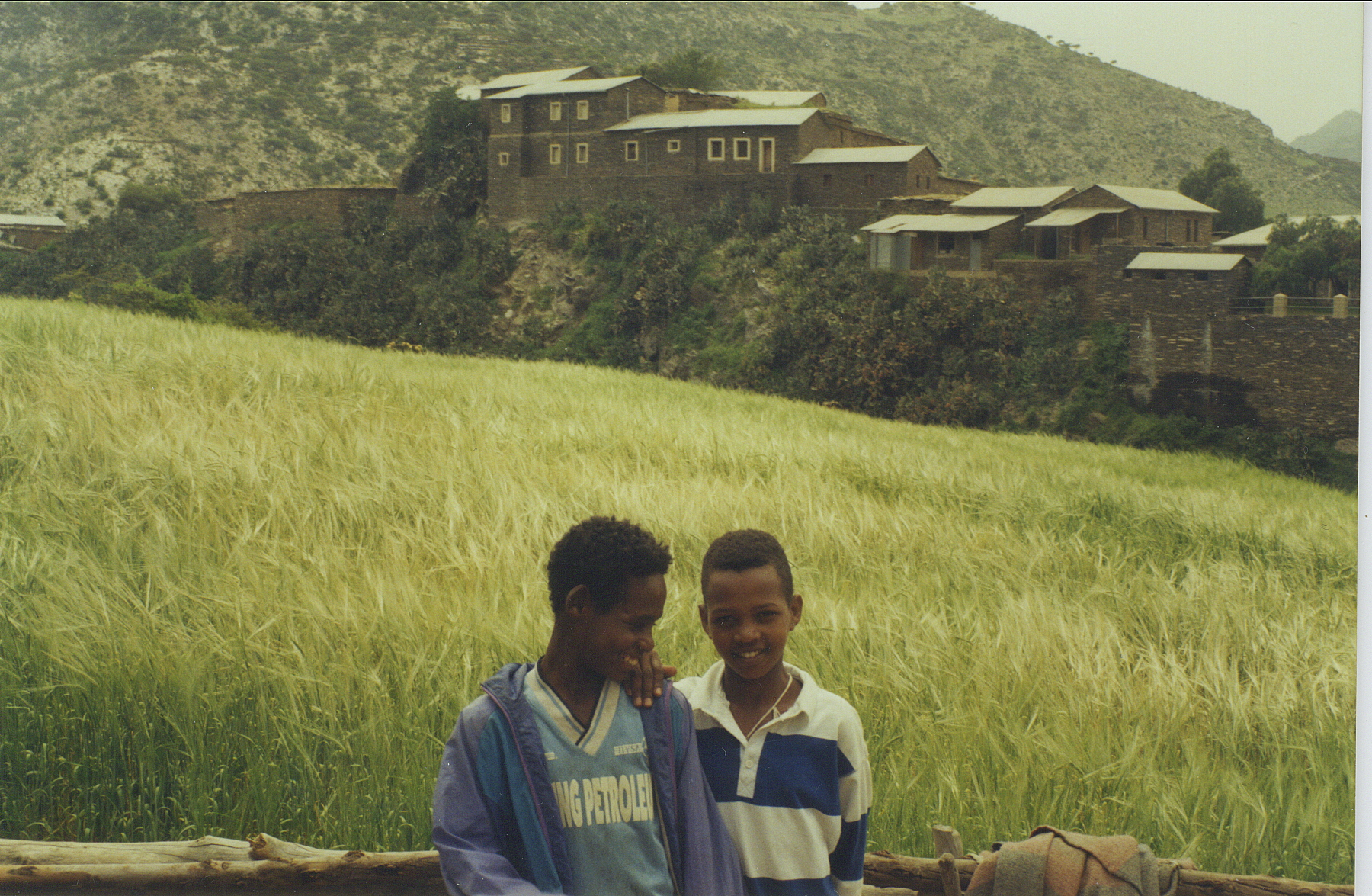

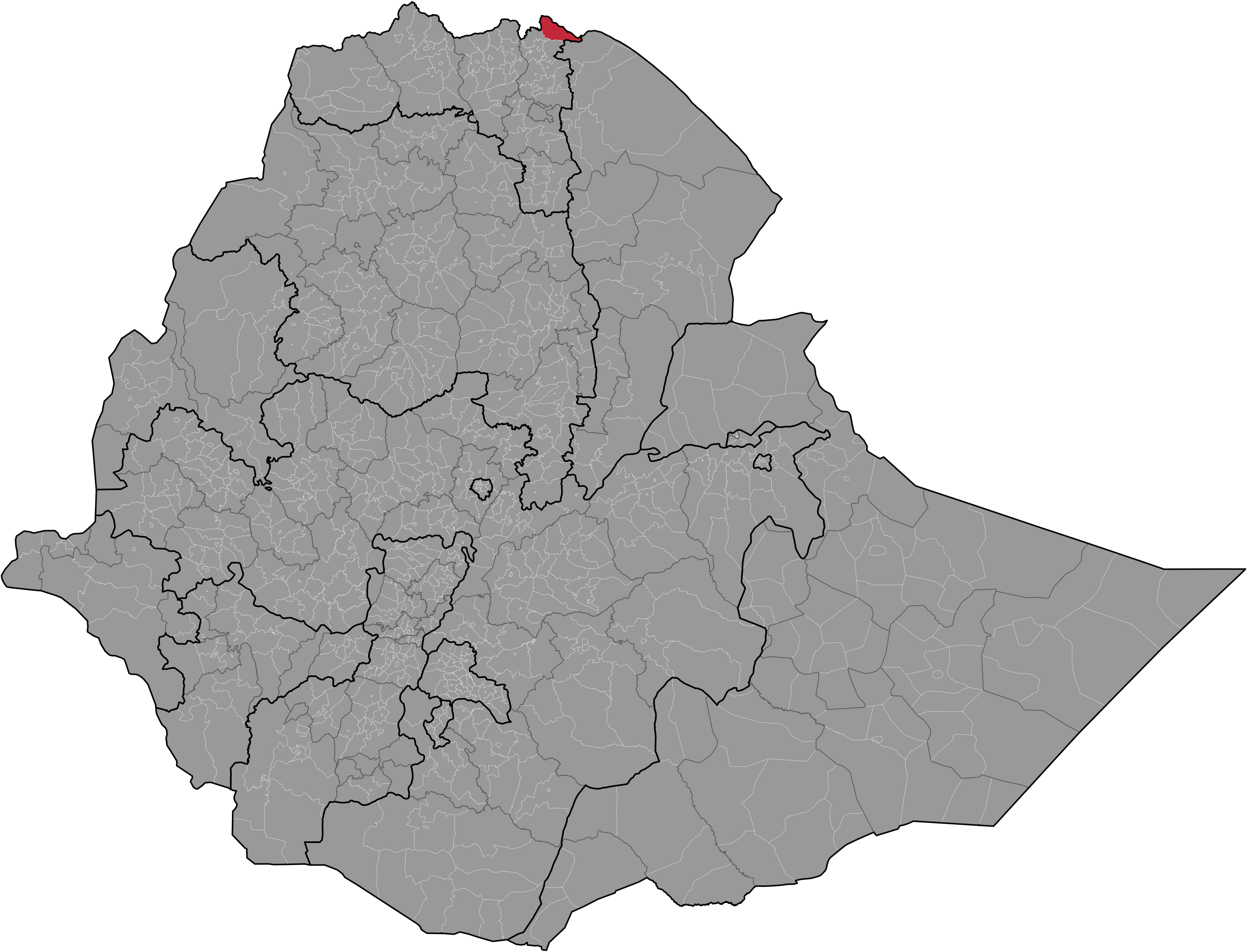
- Country: Ethiopia
- Region: Tigray
- Zone: Misraqawi (Eastern)
- Administrative centre: Dawhan

Area
  - Total: 1,532.64 km^{2} (591.76 sq mi)

Population (2007)
  - Total: 25,471

Irob (Tigrinya: ኢሮብ) is a district (Amharic: woreda) in the Tigray Region of Ethiopia. It is named after the Irob people, who are the predominant ethnic group living there. Located in the Misraqawi Zone at the eastern escarpment of the Ethiopian Highlands, Irob is bordered on the south by Saesi Tsaedaemba, on the west by Gulomahda, on the north and east by the Endelli River which separates it from Eritrea, and on the southeast by the Afar Region. Its administrative center is Dawhan; other towns include Alitena, the former administrative center.

== Overview ==
The woreda is traditionally divided into three parts: Buknite-Arae (the present Waraatele, Aiga, Harze Sebaata, Agar Lekoma and Edamossa kebeles), Adgadi-Arae (the present Edalgeda kebele) and Hassaballa (the present Arae kebele). Elevations range from about 150 meters above sea level where the eastward-flowing Endelli leaves Irob to Mounts Asimba (3,250 meters) and Ayga. Landmarks in Irob woreda include the Assabol Dam near Dawhan, and the monastery of Gunda Gunde.

Both Irob woreda and its urban center of Alitena were occupied by the Eritrean army during the early months of the Eritrean-Ethiopian War. They reportedly inflicted a great amount of damage to Alitena.

== Demographics ==
Based on the 2007 national census conducted by the Central Statistical Agency of Ethiopia (CSA), this woreda has a total population of 25,471, an increase of 43.29% over the 1994 census, of whom 12,412 are men and 13,059 women; 2,091 or 8.21% are urban inhabitants. With an area of 1,532.64 square kilometers, Irob has a population density of 16.62, which is less than the Zone average of 56.93 persons per square kilometer. A total of 5,363 households were counted in this woreda, resulting in an average of 4.75 persons to a household, and 5,165 housing units. The majority of the inhabitants said they practiced Ethiopian Orthodox Christianity, with 55.99% reporting that as their religion, while 40.64% of the population were Catholics, and 3.31% were Muslim.

The 1994 national census reported a total population for this woreda of 17,776 of whom 8,663 were men and 9,113 were women; 490 or 2.76% of its population were urban dwellers. The two largest ethnic groups reported in this woreda were the Irob (91.83%) and the Tigrayan (6.94%); all other ethnic groups made up 1.23% of the population. Saho is spoken as a first language by 89.36%, and 10.5% speak Tigrinya; the remaining 0.14% spoke all other primary languages reported. The vast majority of the Irob people speak Tigrinya as a second language. The majority of the inhabitants were Catholic, with 51.63% of the population reporting that as their faith, while 44.3% practiced Ethiopian Orthodox Christianity, and 4.04% were Muslim. Concerning education, 17.96% of the population were considered literate, which is greater than the Zone average of 9.01%; 29.15% of children aged 7–12 were in primary school; 1.59% of the children aged 13–14 were in junior secondary school; and 3.94% of the inhabitants aged 15–18 were in senior secondary school. Concerning sanitary conditions, all of the urban houses and 10.3% of all houses had access to safe drinking water at the time of the census; none of the urban and about 2% of the total had toilet facilities.

== Agriculture ==
Irob farming is distinguished by its terraced crop lands, known as Daldal. The local farmers build a series of check dams in the seasonal watercourses to trap the silt washed down them, which they gradually raise and lengthen, until after several years a series of step-like terraces are created, which are up to 10 meters high and about 8 meters wide, with about 20 meters between dams. These terraces are then used for farming or grazing. Building daldals is a relatively recent innovation, having been started by two farmers in Awo village in the late 1940s, and advocated by an Irob elder, Zigta Gebre Medhin, starting in the early 1960s.

A sample enumeration performed by the CSA in 2001 interviewed 4,045 farmers in this woreda, who held an average of 0.19 hectares of land. Of the 787 hectares of private land surveyed, 80.56% was in cultivation, 3.94% pasture, 0.89% fallow, 0.51% woodland, and 14.23% was devoted to other uses. For the land under cultivation in this woreda, 53.88% was planted in cereals, 2.03% in pulses, and 0.25% in oilseeds. Fruit trees were planted in 191 hectares. 76.54% of the farmers both raised crops and livestock, while 12.44% only grew crops and 11.03% only raised livestock. Land tenure in this woreda is distributed amongst 95.3% owning their land, 1.65% renting, and 3.18% under other forms of tenure.
