= Gulomakeda =

District in Tigray Region of Ethiopia

Coordinates: 14°30′N 39°20′E

Gulomakeda ጉሎማከዳ
- Woreda
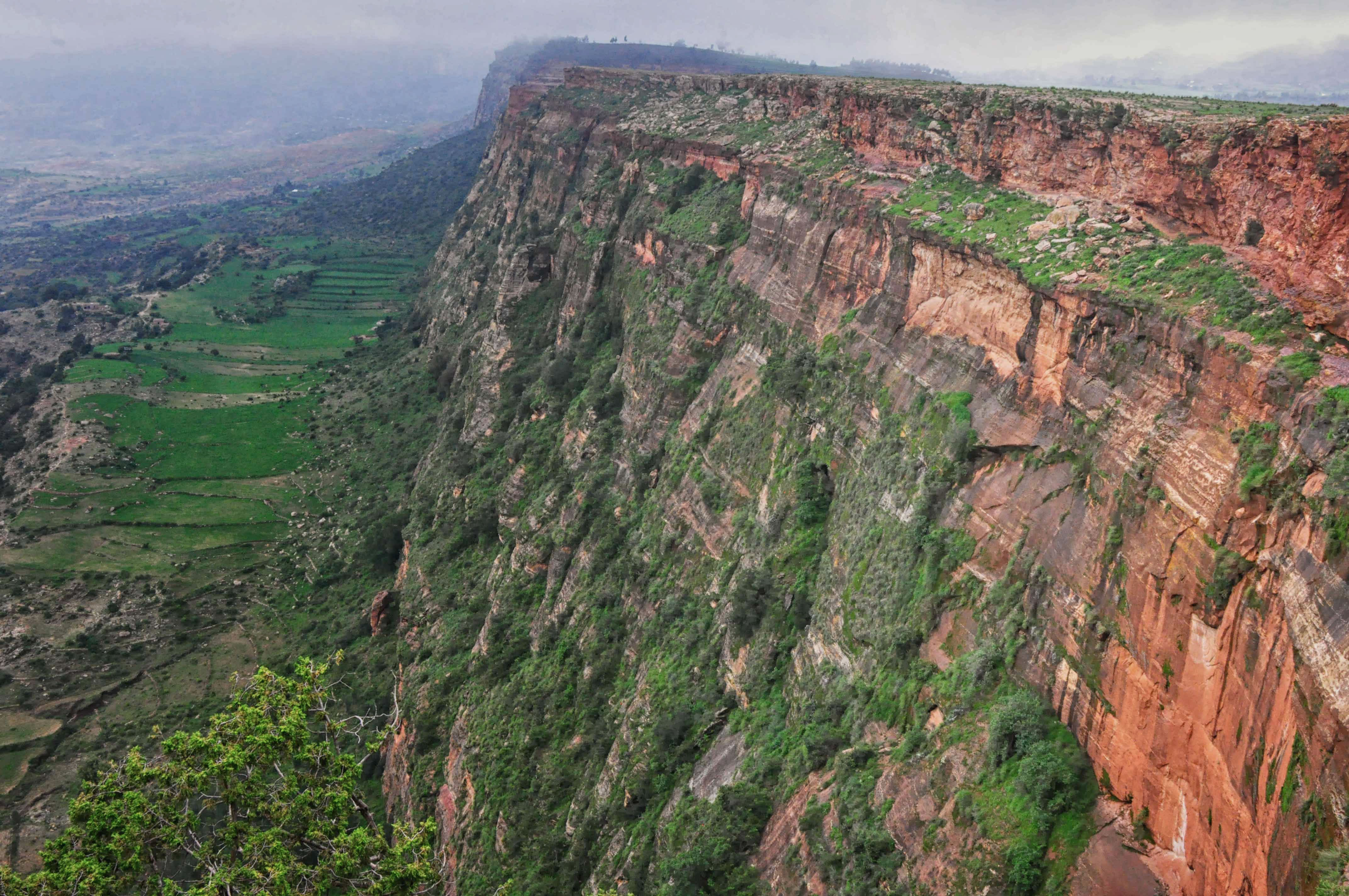

- Flag

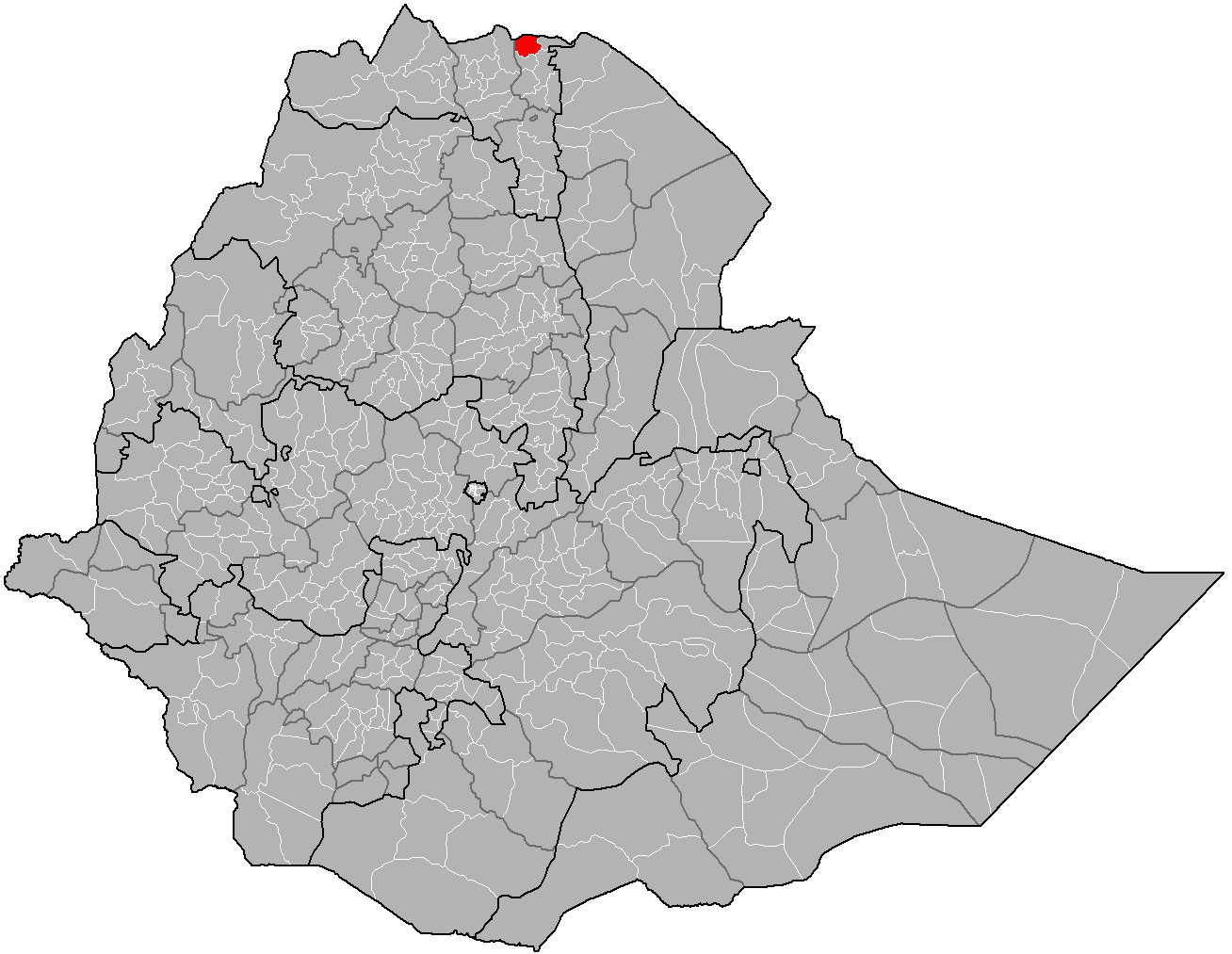
- Country: Ethiopia
- Region: Tigray
- Zone: Misraqawi (Eastern)

Area
  - Total: 1,596.12 km^{2} (616.27 sq mi)

Population (2007)
  - Total: 84,236

Gulomakeda (Tigrinya: ጉሎማከዳ) (also spelled Gulomahda or Gulo Mäḵäda) is one of the districts of Ethiopia, or woredas, in the Tigray Region of Ethiopia. Its name partly comes from the legendary Queen Makeda, also known as the Queen of Sheba. Part of the Misraqawi Zone, Gulomakeda is bordered on the south by Ganta Afeshum, on the west by the Mehakelegnaw (Central) Zone, on the north by Eritrea, on the east by Irob, and on the southeast by Saesi Tsaedaemba. Towns in Gulomakeda include Fatsi town, Sebeya and Zalambessa. Gulomakeda has many historical places like Debredamo. Wereda Gulomakeda has 2 preparatory schools Yemane senior secondary school and Zalambessa senior secondary school. Notable local landmarks in this woreda include ruins that have been dated to the Axumite Kingdom, as well as to the period prior to its rise (700 BC–AD 700). Archeological surveys conducted by Dr. Catherine D'Andrea of Simon Fraser University show that far from being a rural hinterland, Gulomakeda had large towns with elite groups who had access to exotic trade goods during that time. She also identified cultural links to ancient Eritrean settlements, which included Matara and the ancient Ona culture.

== Demographics ==
Based on the 2007 national census conducted by the Central Statistical Agency of Ethiopia (CSA), Gulomakeda has a total population of 84,236, an increase of 6.44% over the 1994 census, of whom 40,549 are men and 43,687 women; 10,101 or 11.99% are urban inhabitants. With an area of 1,596.12 square kilometers, Gulomakeda has a population density of 52.78, which is less than the zone average of 56.93 persons per square kilometer. A total of 18,365 households were counted in this woreda, resulting in an average of 4.59 persons to a household, and 17,673 housing units. The majority of the inhabitants said they practiced Ethiopian Orthodox Christianity, with 99.8% reporting that as their religion.

The 1994 national census reported a total population for this woreda of 79,141 of whom 38,679 were men and 40,462 were women; 6,429 or 8.12% of its population were urban dwellers. The three largest ethnic groups reported in Gulomakeda were the Tigrayan (96.29%), the Saho (1.99%), and foreign nationals from Eritrea (1.59%); all other ethnic groups made up 0.13% of the population. Tigrinya is spoken as a first language by 98.33%, 1.55% speak Saho; the remaining 0.14% spoke all other primary languages reported. The majority of the inhabitants practiced Ethiopian Orthodox Christianity, with 98.33% reporting that as their religion. Concerning education, 19.15% of the population were considered literate, which is greater than the zone average of 9.01%; 28.75% of children aged 7–12 were in primary school; 1.16% of the children aged 13–14 were in junior secondary school; and 1.91% of the inhabitants aged 15–18 were in senior secondary school. Concerning sanitary conditions, about 89% of the urban houses and 18% of all houses had access to safe drinking water at the time of the census; about 11% of the urban and about 2% of the total had toilet facilities.

== Agriculture ==
A sample enumeration performed by the CSA in 2001 interviewed 15,875 farmers in Gulomakeda, who held an average of 0.37 hectares of land. Of the 5864 hectares of private land surveyed, 82.25% was in cultivation, 5.32% pasture, 6.31% fallow, 0.24% woodland, and 14.23% was devoted to other uses. For the land under cultivation in this woreda, 65.36% was planted in cereals, 3.22% in pulses, and 0.85% in oilseeds. Fruit trees were planted in 724 hectares, and 5 hectares in gesho. 74.26% of the farmers both raised crops and livestock, while 23.82% only grew crops and 1.91% only raised livestock. Land tenure in this woreda is distributed amongst 97.49% owning their land, 1.4% renting, and 1.11% under other forms of tenure.

== Churches and monasteries ==
As of 2013, 117 church institutions were registered in Gulomakeda. Churches and monasteries in the woreda that contain historical manuscripts and artefacts include:

- ʿUra Qirqos/ʿUra Mäsqäl
- ʿAddäqäḥarsi Mäkanä Ḥǝywät P̣araqliṭos
- Däbrä Zäyt Qǝddǝst Maryam
- Däbrä Maʿṣo Qǝddus Yoḥannǝs
- May Č̣äw Qǝddus Mikaʾel
- Mǝdrä Ruba Däbrä Gännät Qǝddǝst Śǝllase
- Mänäbäyti Däbrä Ṣǝyon Qǝddǝst Maryam
- Fäqada Däbrä Bǝrhan Qǝddǝst Maryam
- Sämaz Däbrä Mǝṭmaq Qǝddǝst Maryam gädam
- Säbäya Däbrä Gännät Qǝddǝst Maryam
- Qärsäbär Däbrä Sälam Qǝddus Mikaʾel
- ʾAgamyo Qǝddus Mikaʾel
- ʾAgärhǝse Däbrä Qǝddusan ʾAbunä Mamas gädam
- ʾAraʿro Täklä Haymanot
- ʿAddi Qolqwal Giyorgis
- ʿƎmbäyto Täklä Haymanot
- Mäkaʾǝlo Mäkanä Lǝʿul Kidanä Mǝḥrät gädam
- ʾAmbasät Kidanä Mǝḥrät
- Däbrä Dammo ʾAbunä ʾArägawi gädam
- ʾAḥzära Däbrä Mǝhrät Qǝddǝst Maryam
- ʿAddi Qiyaḥto Qǝddǝst Maryam Kudo Hawwǝs
- Säglat Qǝddǝst Maryam / Qǝddus Mikaʾel
- Sǝddäyto Däbrä Gännät Qǝddus Mikaʾel
- Taḥtay Ruba Däbrä Bǝrhan Qǝddǝst Maryam
- May Ṣaʿda Qǝddǝst Śǝllase
- ʾƎnda Ḥawaryat P̣eṭros wä-P̣awlos
