= Saesi Tsaedaemba =

District in Tigray Région, Ethiopia

Coordinates: 14°15′N 39°40′E

Saesi Tsaedaemba ሳዕሲዕ ጻዕዳ እምባ Saʿisiʿ Tsaʿida Imba
- Woreda
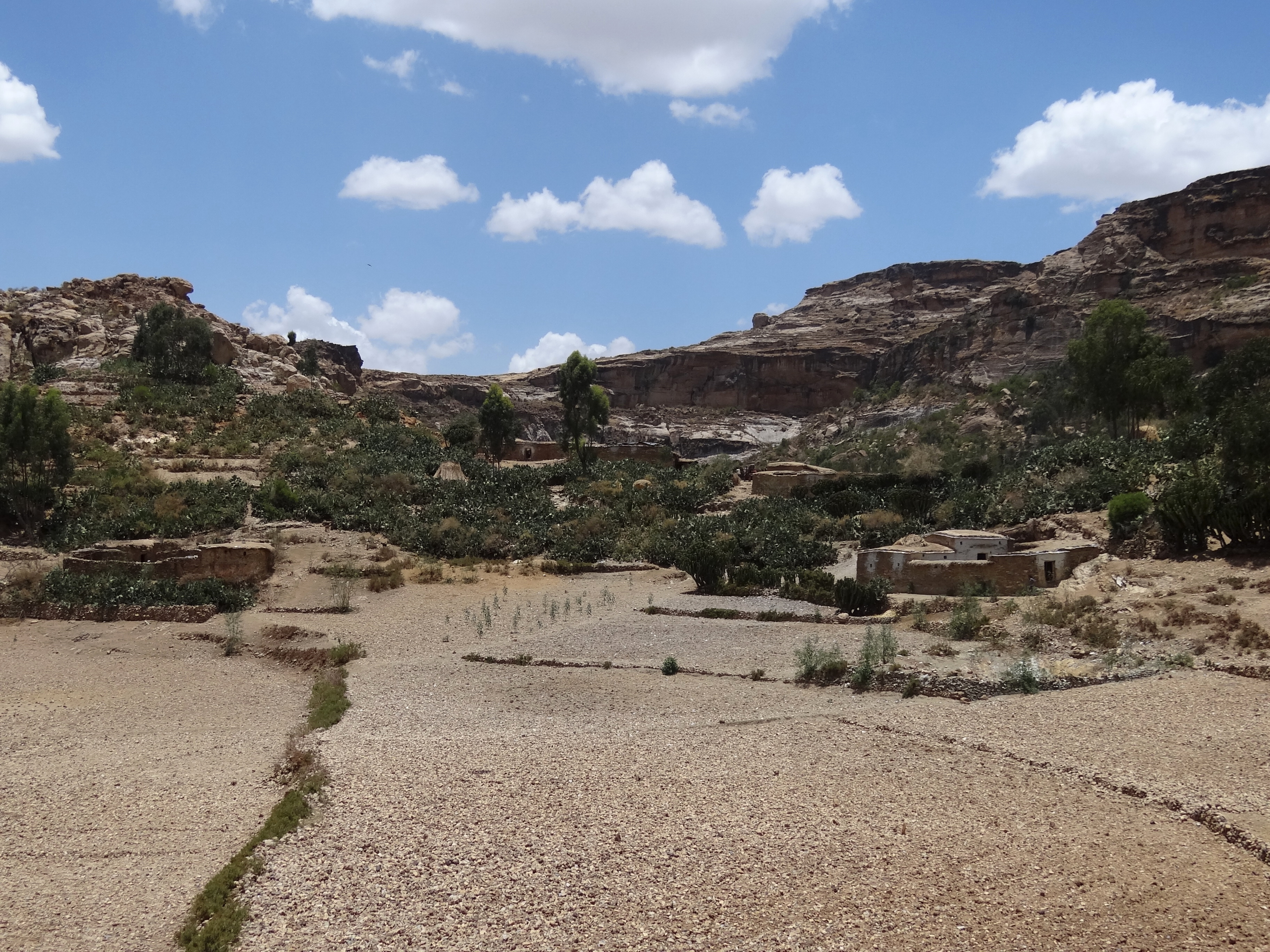

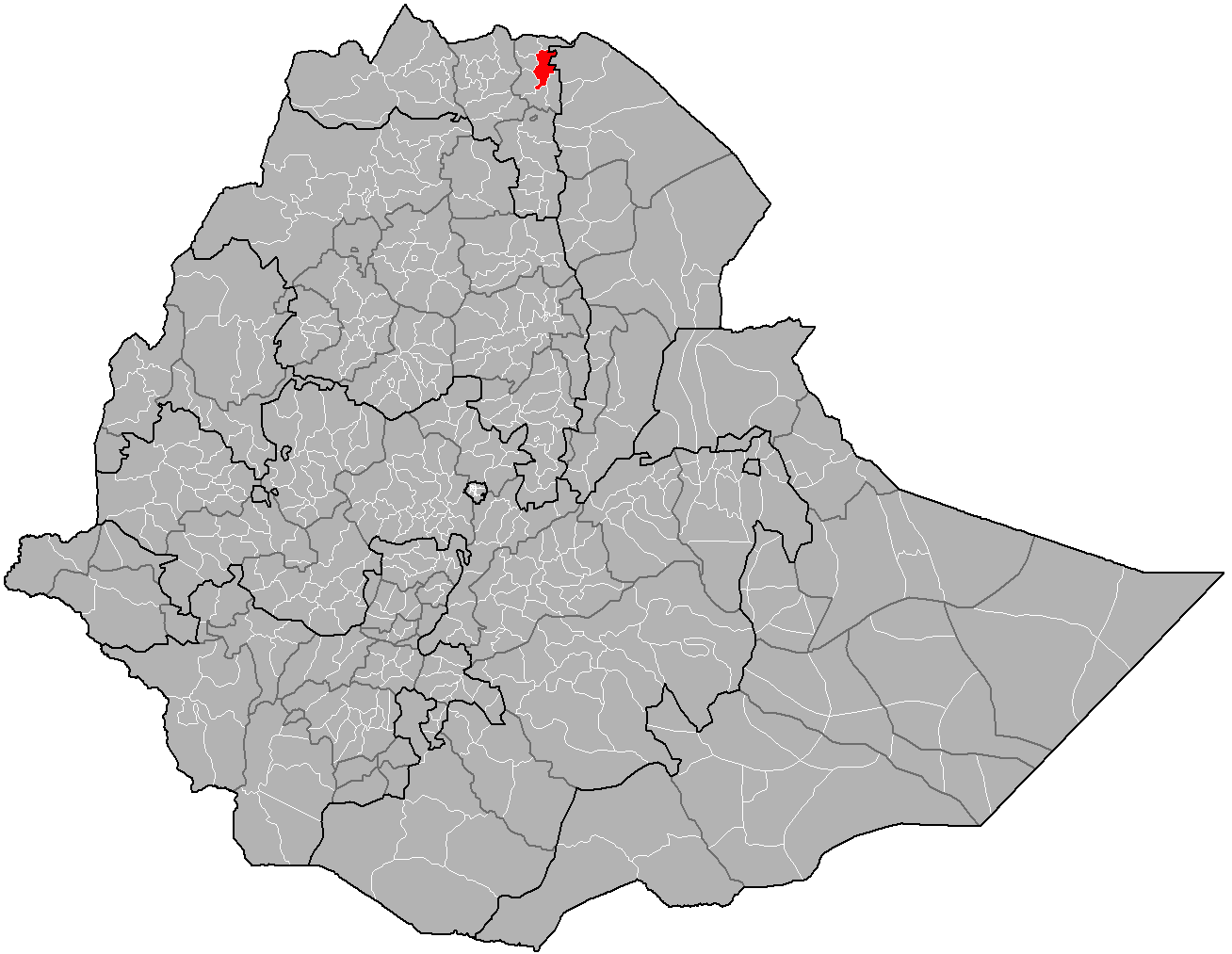
- Country: Ethiopia
- Region: Tigray
- Zone: Misraqawi (Eastern)
- Administrative centre: Freweyni

Area
  - Total: 2,511.47 km^{2} (969.68 sq mi)

Population (2007)
  - Total: 139,191

Saesi Tsaedaemba (Tigrinya: ሳዕሲዕ ጻዕዳ እምባ; also transliterated as Saʿsiʿ Ṣaʿda ʾƎmba) is one of woredas in the Tigray Region of Ethiopia. Located in the Misraqawi Zone at the eastern edge of the Ethiopian Highlands, Saesi Tsaedaemba is bordered on the south by Kilte Awulaelo, on the southwest by Hawzen, on the west by Ganta Afeshum, on the northwest by Gulomahda, on the north by Irob, on the east by the Afar Region, and on the southeast by Atsbi Wenberta. Towns in Saesi Tsaedaemba include Edaga Hamus and Freweyni also known as Sinkata) where the woreda office is located .

== Overview ==
There are several local monolithic churches in Saesi Tsaedaemba. These include Adi Chewa Arbuta (near Freweyni), and the cluster of Petros and Paulos Melehayzenghi, Mikael Melehayzenghi and Medhane Alem Adi Kasho (near the village of Teka Tesfai). Near Edaga Hamus not only can one find the monolithic church of Gebriel Tsilalmao, but also nearby is a stelae similar to those found in Axum only smaller, in the cemetery of the church of Maryam Tehot (a modern structure built on the foundations of an older building); the monument's date is unknown, but presumed pre-Christian. Mikael Britmukae one of the rock church found in Saesi Tsaedaemba.

Saesi Tsaedaemba was one of nine woredas in Tigray most affected by a drought during 2008, requiring emergency food supplies to be requested for an estimated 600,000 people.

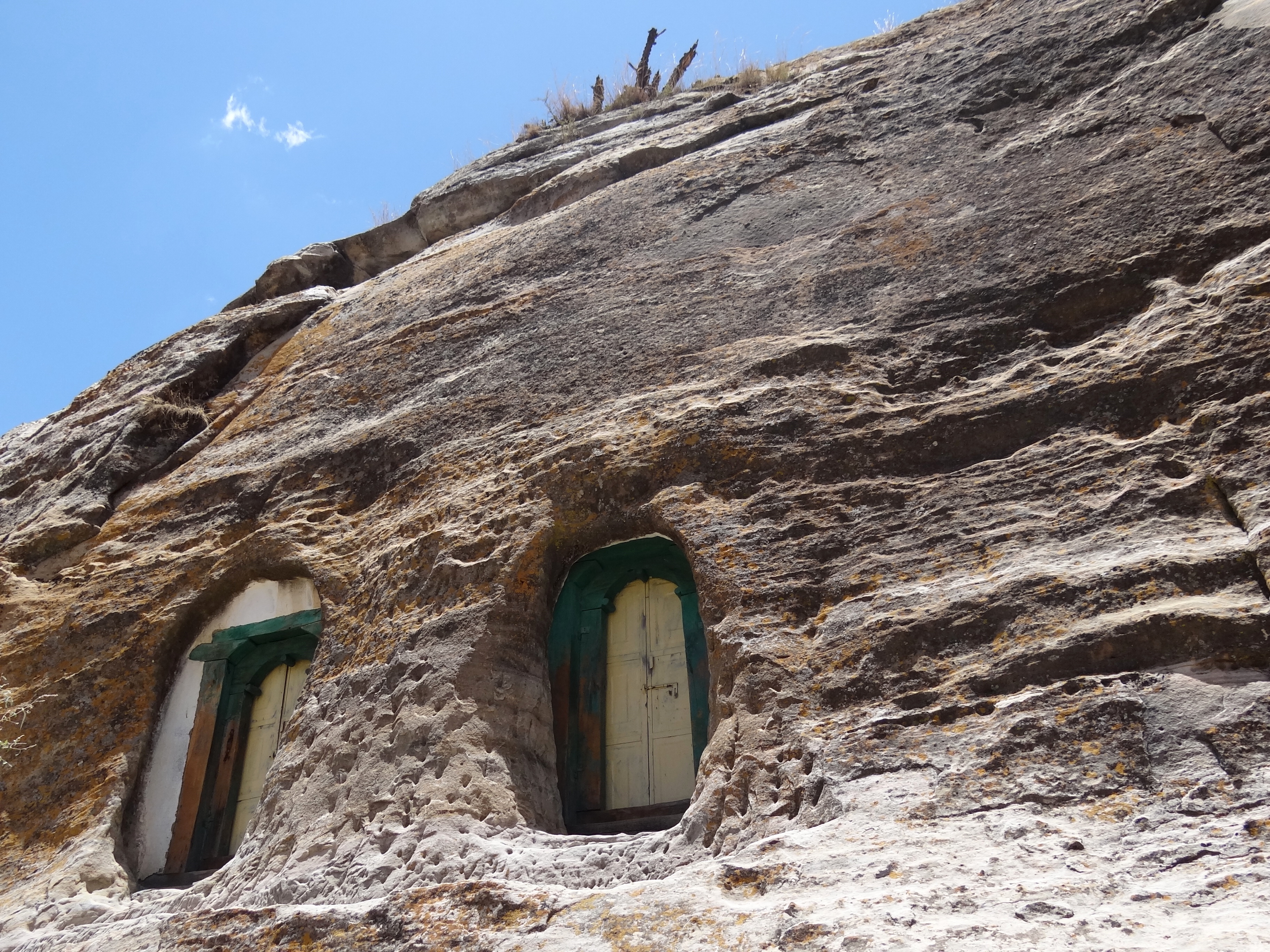
Mikael Melehayzenghi Church

== History ==
During the Tigray War, attacks were carried out on the woreda by the joint Ethiopian and Eritrean armies. On 18 December 2020, an EEPA report stated that 37 civilians were killed by Eritrean troops in Mariam Dengelat. This follows further reports of Ethiopian ENDF soldiers shooting at unarmed civilians. On 19 December 2020, killings occurred in Idaga Hamus, major town of the woreda. Eritrean soldiers killed approximately 150 civilians, including a priest and women seeking refuge in a church, located 4 km to the west of Marieam Dengelat. Idaga Hamus and some rural villages (Maimegelta, Dengelat, Tsa'a and Hangoda) were under the control of Eritrean forces. The military is slaughtering the animals. People are starving to death.

== Demographics ==
Based on the 2007 national census conducted by the Central Statistical Agency of Ethiopia (CSA), this woreda has a total population of 139,191, an increase of 37.16% over the 1994 census, of whom 65,796 are men and 73,395 women; 18,933 or 13.60% are urban inhabitants. With an area of 2,511.47 square kilometers, Saesi Tsaedaemba has a population density of 55.42, which is less than the Zone average of 56.93 persons per square kilometer. A total of 30,164 households were counted in this woreda, resulting in an average of 4.61 persons to a household, and 29,258 housing units. The majority of the inhabitants said they practiced Ethiopian Orthodox Christianity, with 94.3% reporting that as their religion, while 5.31% of the population were Muslim.

The 1994 national census reported a total population for this woreda of 101,478, of whom 48,130 were men and 53,348 were women; 10,543 or 10.39% of its population were urban dwellers. The three largest ethnic groups reported in Saesi Tsaedaemba were the Tigrayan (95.65%), the Afar (2.39%), and the Saho (1.82%); all other ethnic groups made up 0.14% of the population. Tigrinya is spoken as a first language by 95.72%, Afar by 2.21%, and 1.92% speak Saho; the remaining 0.15% spoke all other primary languages reported. The majority of the inhabitants practiced Ethiopian Orthodox Christianity, with 94.97% reporting that as their religion, and 4.39% were Muslim. Concerning education, 13.42% of the population were considered literate, which is greater than the Zone average of 9.01%; 21.97% of children aged 7–12 were in primary school; 1.4% of the children aged 13–14 were in junior secondary school; and 0.98% of the inhabitants aged 15–18 were in senior secondary school. Concerning sanitary conditions, about 80% of the urban houses and 19% of all houses had access to safe drinking water at the time of the census; about 9% of the urban and about 3% of the total had toilet facilities.

== Agriculture ==
A sample enumeration performed by the CSA in 2001 interviewed 24.879 farmers in this woreda, who held an average of 0.51 hectares of land. Of the 12,661 hectares of private land surveyed, 77.08% was under cultivation, 7.61% pasture, 7.56% fallow, 0.7% in woodland, and 7.06% was devoted to other uses. For the land under cultivation in this woreda, 60% was planted in cereals, 9.6% in pulses, 0.81% in oilseeds, and 5 hectares in vegetables. The total area planted in fruit trees was 722 hectares, while 17 were planted in gesho. 69.31% of the farmers both raised crops and livestock, while 26.28% only grew crops and 4.41% only raised livestock. Land tenure in this woreda is distributed amongst 96.36% owning their land, and 2.39% renting; the number of people holding their land under other forms of tenure is missing.

== 2020 woreda reorganisation ==
In 2020, woreda Sa'isie Tsa'ida Imba became inoperative and its territory belongs to the following new woredas:

- Tsa'ida Imba
- Sa'isi'e woreda
- Sinkata town
- Idaga Hamus town

== Churches and monasteries ==
As of 2013, 126 church institutions were registered in the woreda. Churches and monasteries in the woreda that contain historical manuscripts and artefacts include:

- Mänäwät Giyorgis ʾƎnda Maryam
- May Raza Täklä Haymanot
- Säwnä Däbrä Sina Däbrä Gännät Maryam
- Wälwalo Däbrä Bǝrhan Qirqos
- Qälaq̱ǝl Ṣǝyon Maryam
- Ḥangoda Däbrä Mǝḥrät Qǝddus Mikaʾel
- Ṣäbäla Däbrä Gännät Maryam gädam
- Sänqaṭa Fǝrewäyni Däbrä Ṣǝge Qǝddǝst Maryam
- Bet Muḵaʿ Qǝddus Mikaʾel
