= Alitena =

Alitena ዓሊተና
- Town
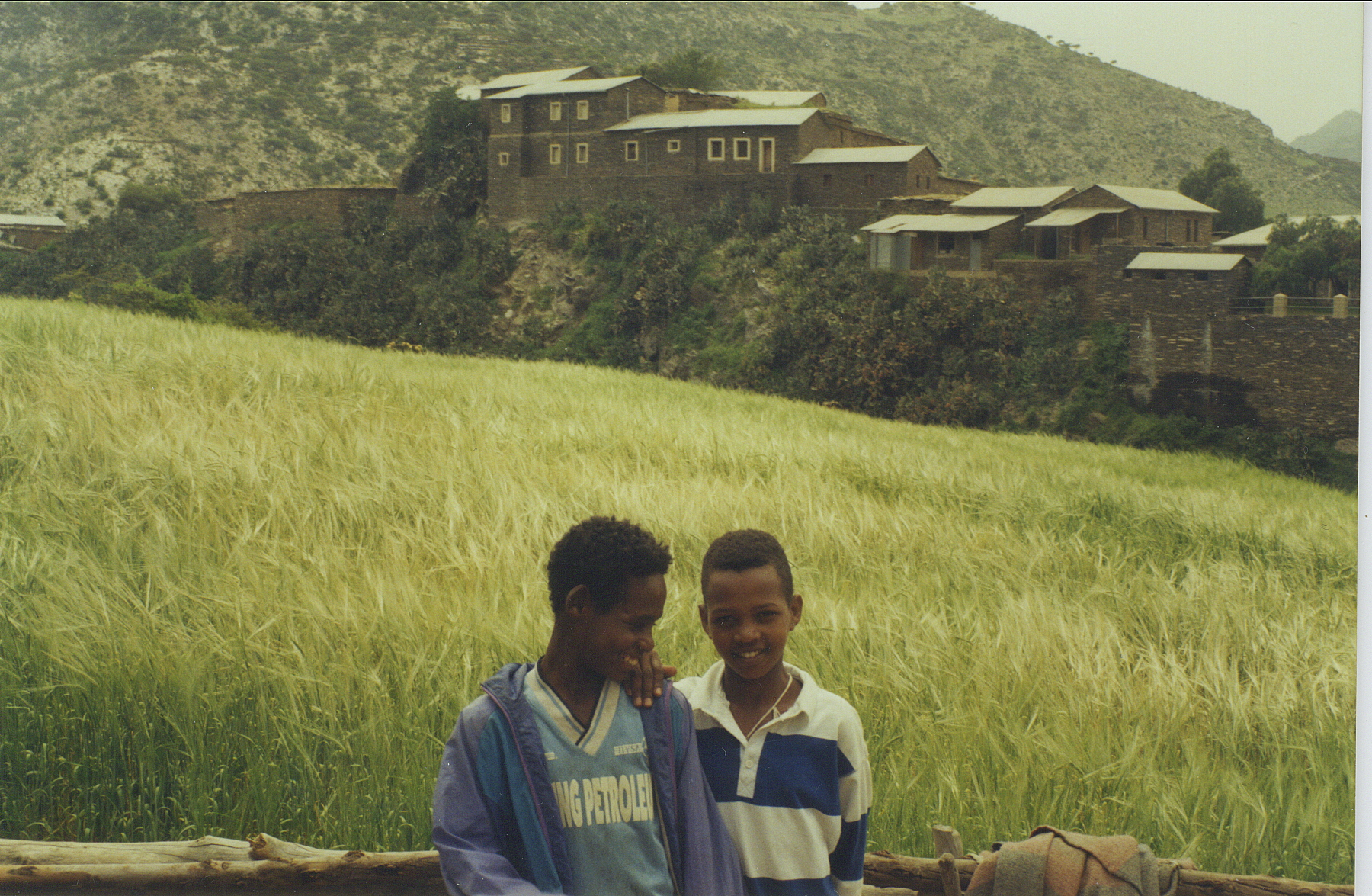

- Location within Ethiopia
- Coordinates: 14°31′N 39°34′E
- Country: Ethiopia
- Region: Tigray
- Zone: Misraqawi (Eastern)
- Woreda: Irob Woreda
- Elevation: 1,850 m (6,070 ft)

Population (2007)
  - Total: 4,905
- Time zone: UTC+3 (EAT)

Alitena (Ge'ez: ዓሊተና) is a town in northern Ethiopia, located in the Misraqawi (Eastern) Zone of the Tigray Region. Alitena was the administrative center of Irob woreda until Dawhan was made the new center in 2003.

== History ==
=== 19th Century ===
Alitena has been an important Roman Catholic center in northern Ethiopia as early as 1845, when disciples of Justin de Jacobis converted some of the local residents from the Ethiopian Church. At Easter 1847 the Catholic missionaries de Jacobis and Guglielmo Massaia, together with two Ethiopian priests recently ordained by them, celebrated mass there in 1847. Although lacking churches, de Jacobis was fond of the people there, and considered Alitena as a possible place of refuge if there should be persecutions against the Catholics. Since 1934 the Lazarist Mission in Tigray had its main center at Alitena.

=== 20th Century ===
Alitena is connected to Zalambessa by a 35 kilometer road which was constructed under the inspiration and leadership of the local Roman Catholic priests, and opened 5 December 1974.

== Demographics ==
Based on the 2007 national census conducted by the Central Statistical Agency, this town has a total population of 4,905, of whom 2,431 are men and 2,474 are women. A total of 975 households were counted in this town, resulting in an average of 5.03 persons to a household, and 927 housing units. The 1994 census reported the town had a total population of 857, of whom 447 were men and 410 were women.
