= Freweyni =

Freweyni Sinkata, Sink'at'a, Sinqata, Sincata, Senkata, Frewini
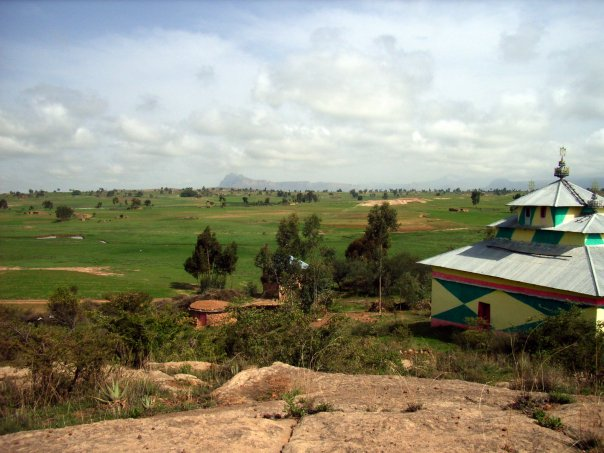

- Location within Ethiopia
- Coordinates: 14°3′N 39°34′E
- Country: Ethiopia
- Region: Tigray
- Zone: Misraqawi Zone
- Woreda: Saesi Tsaedaemba
- Time zone: UTC+3 (EAT)

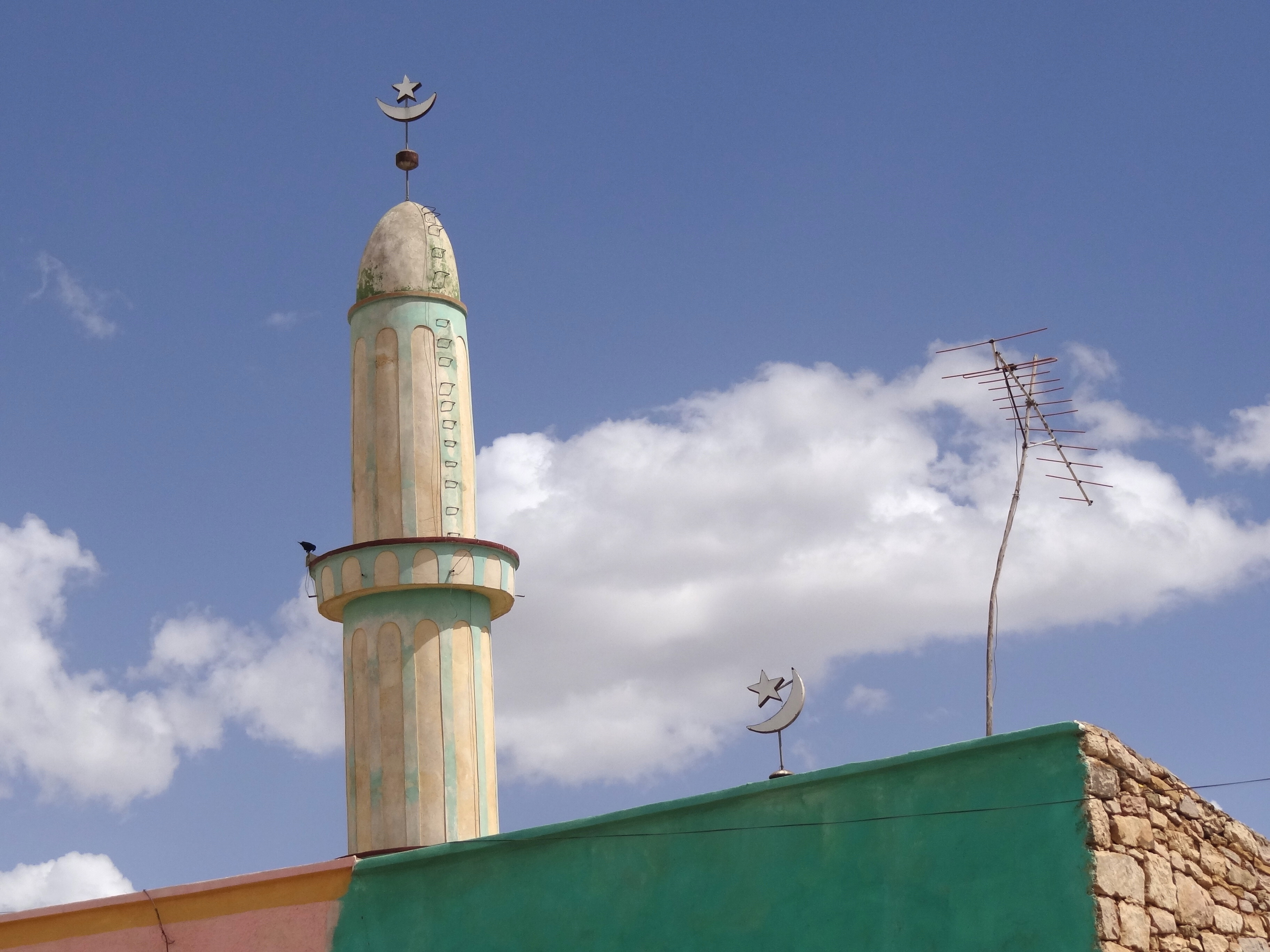
Mosque in Freweyni (Sinkata) - Ethiopia (8713311209)

Freweyni (also known as Sinkata or ferawun) is a town in northern Ethiopia. Located 80 kilometers north of Mekele in the Misraqawi Zone of the Tigray Region (or kilil) of Ethiopia, this town has a latitude and longitude of 14°3′N 39°34′E with an elevation of 2480 meters above sea level and is located along Ethiopian Highway 2.

== Naming ==
During the Italo-Abyssinian War, a large group of Ethiopian soldiers, marching to the north to fight the Italians, arrived almost starving at the town of Freweyni. In honour of this march, the town was renamed to Sinkata.

In 1991, after the EPRDF seized power, new administrative divisions came into place. South of the town, a suburban tabia was created. To distinguish the town tabia from the surrounding tabia, the name of the town was changed again to Freweyni. The surrounding area kept the Sinkata name. Nowadays, both Freweyni and as well as Sinkata are still commonly used to refer to the town.
