= Eastern Zone, Tigray =

Zone in northern Ethiopia

Coordinates: 14°10′N 39°30′E

Eastern Zone ዞባ ምብራቕ
- Zone
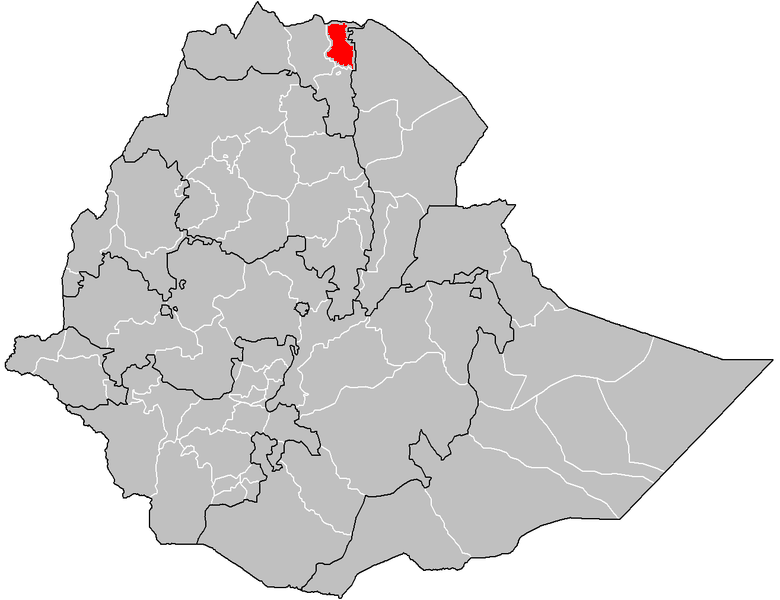
- Eastern Tigray location in Ethiopia
- Country: Ethiopia
- Region: Tigray
- Largest city: Adigrat

Area
  - Total: 13,268.99 km^{2} (5,123.19 sq mi)

Population (2012 est.)
  - Total: 862,348
  - Density: 64.9897/km^{2} (168.323/sq mi)

The Eastern Zone (Tigrinya: ዞባ ምብራቕ) is a zone in the Tigray Region of Ethiopia. It is bordered on the east by the Afar Region, on the south by the South Eastern Zone, on the west by the Central Zone and on the north by Eritrea. Its highest point is Mount Asimba (3,250 m). Towns and cities in the Eastern Zone include Adigrat, Atsbi, Hawzen, and Wukro.

== Demographics ==
A map of the regions and zones of Ethiopia

Based on the 2007 Census conducted by the Central Statistical Agency of Ethiopia (CSA), this Zone has a total population of 755,343, of whom 359,638 are men and 395,705 women; 146,064 or 19.34% are urban inhabitants. Two largest ethnic groups reported in the Eastern Zone were the Tigray (95.32%) and Irob (3.78%); all other ethnic groups made up 0.9% of the population. Tigrinya is spoken as a first language by 95.36% and Saho language by 3.67%; the remaining 0.97% spoke all other primary languages reported. 95.73% of the population said they were Orthodox Christians, 2.4% were Muslim, and 1.79% were Catholics.

In the 1994 Census, zone's population was 584,946, of whom 280,679 were males and 304,267 females; 85,508 or 14.6% of its population were urban dwellers. The Zone is predominantly Tigrayan, at 94.9% of the population, while 3.6% were Saho 0.9% were Afar, 0.3% Eritrean, and all other ethnic groups 0.2%.

According to a May 24, 2004 World Bank memorandum, 9% of the inhabitants of the zone have access to electricity, and has a road density of 88.2 kilometers per 1000 square kilometers, the average rural household has 0.5 hectare of land (compared to the national average of 1.01 hectare of land and a regional average of 0.51) and the equivalent of 0.7 heads of livestock. 38.9% of the population is in non-farm related jobs, compared to the national average of 25% and a regional average of 28%. 91% of all eligible children are enrolled in primary school, and 35% in secondary schools. It is not known how much of the zone is exposed to malaria, but none is exposed to the tsetse fly. The memorandum gave this zone a drought risk rating of 573.
