= Phrynobatrachus njiomock =

Conservation status
- Critically Endangered (IUCN 3.1)

Scientific classification
- Kingdom: Animalia
- Phylum: Chordata
- Class: Amphibia
- Order: Anura
- Family: Phrynobatrachidae
- Genus: Phrynobatrachus
- Species: P. njiomock

Binomial name
- Phrynobatrachus njiomock Zimkus and Gvoždík, 2013
- Phrynobatrachus njiomock is only known from near Lake Oku, Cameroon

Species of amphibian

Phrynobatrachus njiomock is a species of frogs in the family Phrynobatrachidae. It is endemic to Cameroon and is only known from Mount Oku where it occurs near Lake Oku. It has not been observed after 2010 and might already be extinct. The specific name njiomock means "eleventh" in Oku language and refers to the name "Phrynobatrachus sp. 11" that Amiet used in 1978 to refer to a specimen collected near Lake Oku. Common name Lake Oku puddle frog has been proposed for this species.

== Description ==
Adult males measure 28–35 mm (1.1–1.4 in) and adult females 25–31 mm (1.0–1.2 in) in snout–vent length. The body shape is compact and the hind limbs are strong. The tympanum is indistinct or only scarcely visible. Fingers lack webbing and have small but distinct discs. Toes are moderately to extensively webbed and have small discs. Dorsal coloration varies from greyish brown to dark brown. Coloration may appear uniform but typically includes some lighter and darker spots, often with reddish spots on head and limbs. Some individuals have a light brown mid-dorsal stripe. Males have light brown mottling on the throat.

== Habitat and conservation ==
Phrynobatrachus njiomock occurs in or close to streams in montane forest at elevations of 2,219–2,400 m (7,280–7,874 ft) above sea level, as well as near the shores of Lake Oku at 2,219 m a.s.l. It is predominantly crepuscularly and nocturnally active. Breeding might take place in streams. Tadpoles commonly develop in the shallow waters of Lake Oku.

Phrynobatrachus njiomock used to be the most abundant frog at Lake Oku (apart from the fully aquatic Xenopus longipes), but it has declined in recent years; as of 2019, it had not been observed since 2010 despite monthly monitoring in the area. The decline is similar to declines associated with chytridiomycosis, although the causal link remains unproven. Another threat is potential introduction of fish to Lake Oku. Although a large portion of the species' small range (14 km²) is within Kilum-Ijim Plantlife Sanctuary, livestock grazing and agricultural expansion occurs within the area.
