= List of volcanoes in Cameroon =

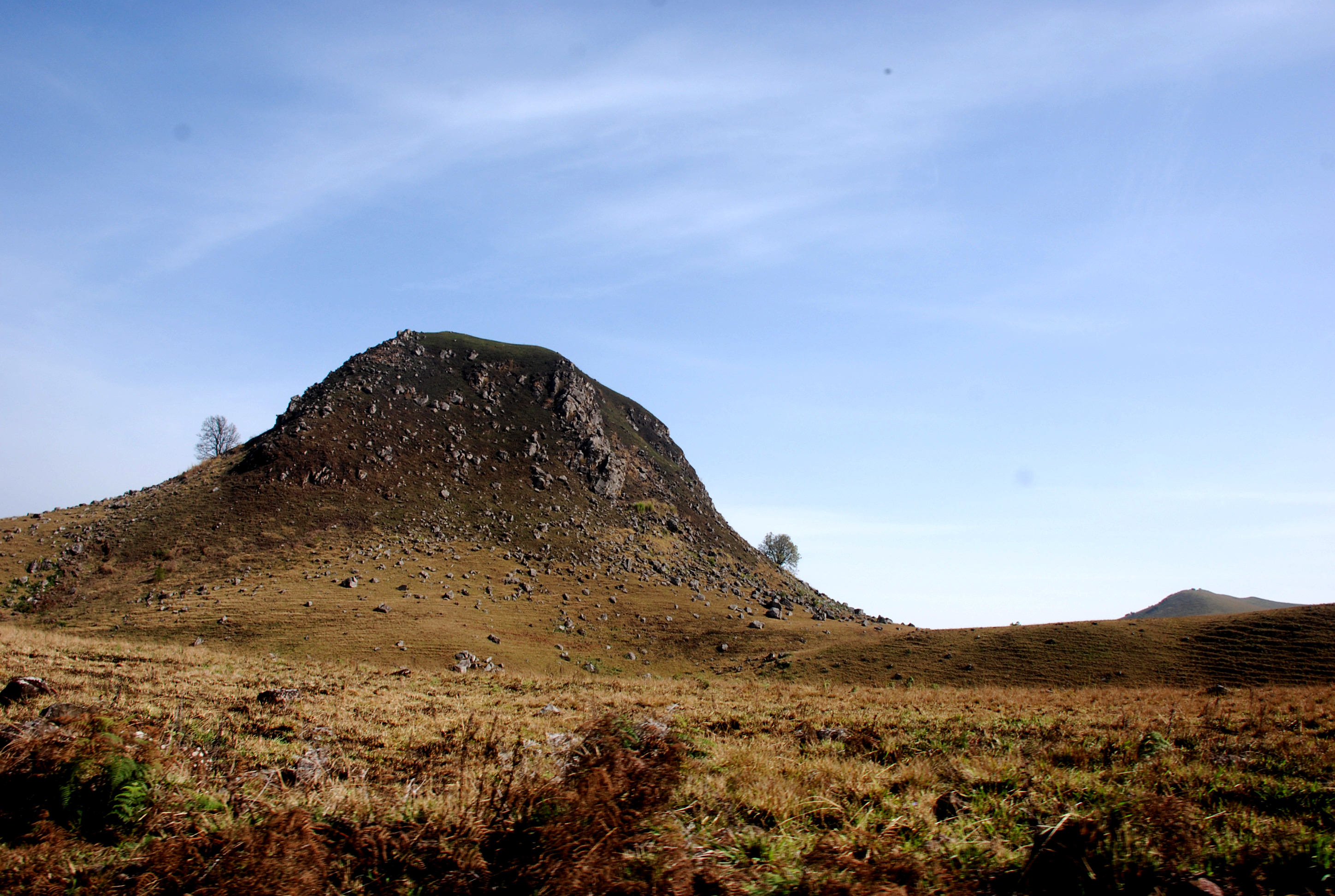
Mount Manengouba

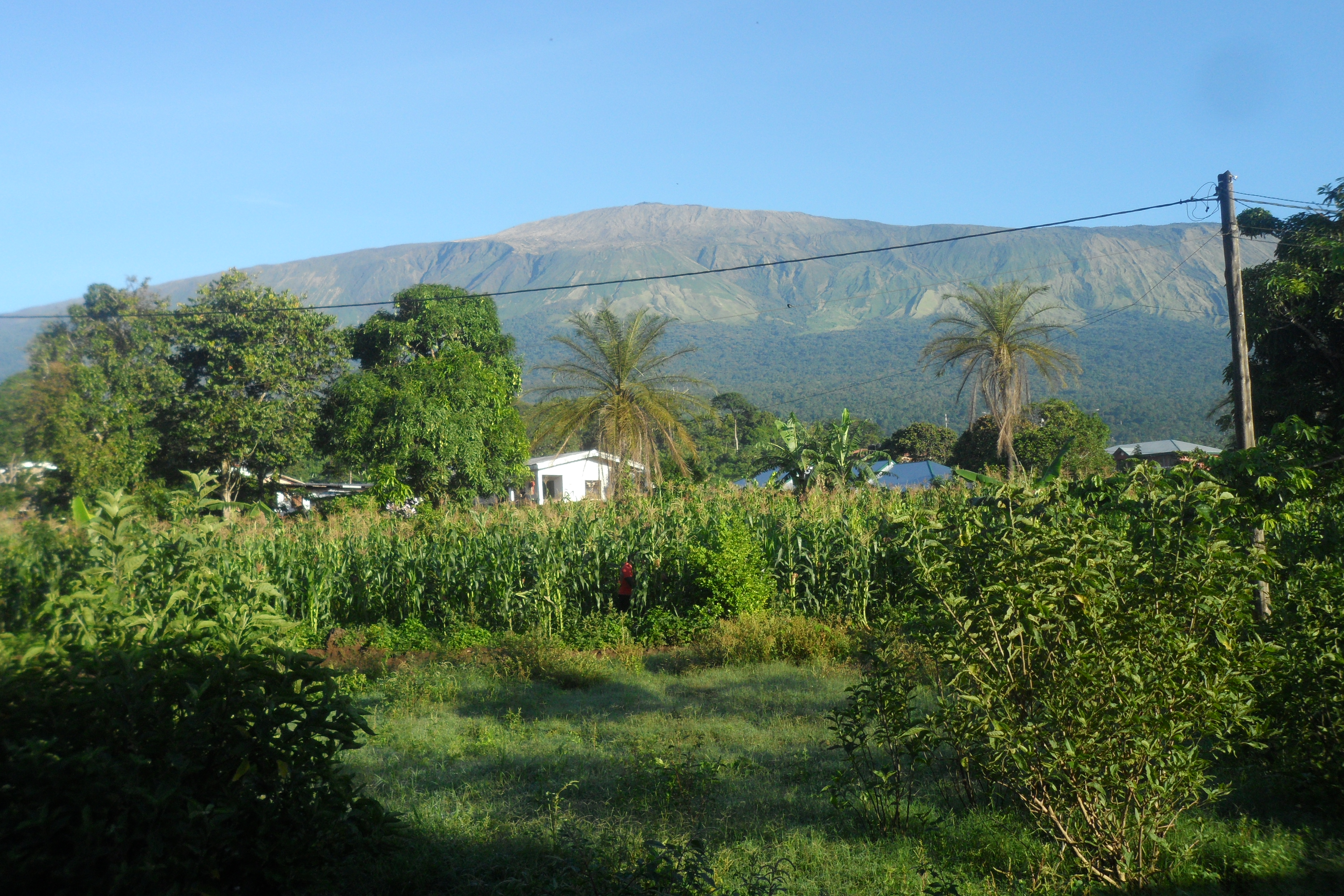
Mount Cameroon

This is a list of active and extinct volcanoes in Cameroon.

Name	Elevation		Location	Last eruption
Name	meters	feet	Coordinates	Last eruption
Cameroon	4,095	13,435	4.203°N 9.170°E	2012
Enep	-	-	6.3°N 10.5°E	-
Mount Manengouba	2,411	7,910	5.03°N 9.83°E	Holocene
Ngaoundere Plateau	-	-	7.25°N 13.67°E	Holocene
Oku Volcanic Field	3,011	9,878	6.25°N 10.50°E	1983
Tchabal Nganha	1,927	6,322	7.35°N 14.00°E	
Tombel Graben	500	1,640	4.75°N 9.67°E	Holocene
