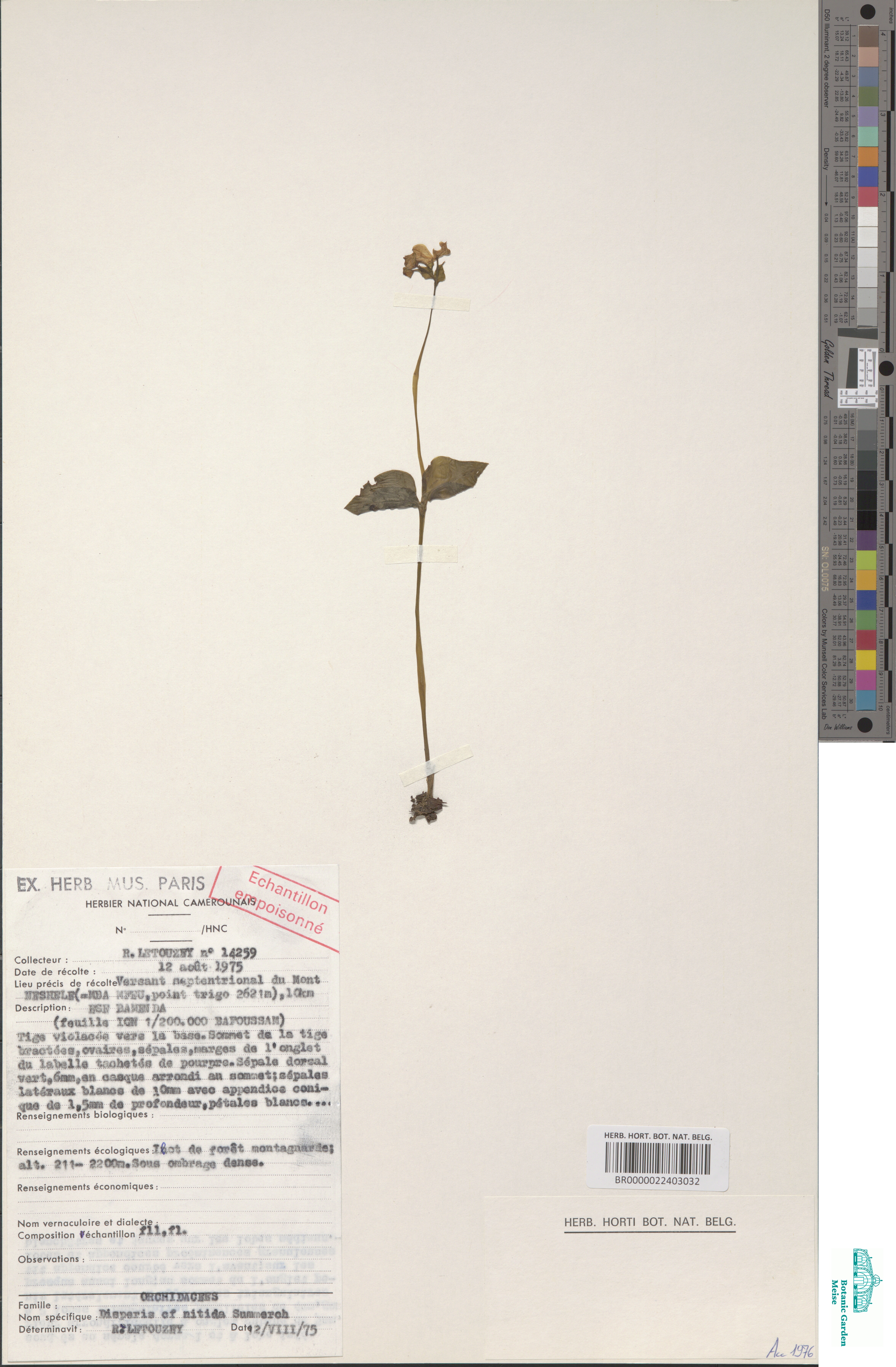
- Disperis nitida herbarium specimen

Conservation status
- Vulnerable (IUCN 3.1)

Scientific classification
- Kingdom: Plantae
- Clade: Tracheophytes
- Clade: Angiosperms
- Clade: Monocots
- Order: Asparagales
- Family: Orchidaceae
- Subfamily: Orchidoideae
- Genus: Disperis
- Species: D. nitida

Binomial name
- Disperis nitida Summerh.

= Disperis nitida =

Species of plant

Disperis nitida is a species of orchid endemic to Cameroon. Described in 1942, D. nitida is now considered a vulnerable species.

== Taxonomy and history ==
Disperis nitida was described by English botanist V. S. Summerhayes in 1956 based on two specimens collected from mountain habitat in the Bamenda region of Cameroon.

== Distribution and habitat ==
Disperis nitida is endemic to western Cameroon, with populations known from the Bamenda Highlands, Kilum-Ijim Forest, Mount Oku, and Mount Mwanenguba. A 2016 assessment for the IUCN Red List of Threatened Species estimated the total area of occupancy of this species to be 40 km^{2} (15 sq mi). It grows in montane and submontane forests at elevations of 1,800–2,800 m (5,900–9,200 ft).

== Description ==
Disperis nitida is a herbaceous plant growing to 12–50 cm (4.7–19.7 in) tall. The stems are smooth, upright, and thickened at the base. Each stem bears two ovate leaves, with each leaf measuring 15–70 mm (0.59–2.76 in) by 12–60 mm (0.47–2.36 in). The inflorescence bears one to five white flowers.

== Ecology ==
Disperis nitida grows as a terrestrial plant or as an epiphyte on low branches in shaded areas. Flowering occurs in September.

== Conservation status ==
Disperis nitida is listed as vulnerable by the International Union for Conservation of Nature under criteria B1ab(i,ii,iii,iv,v) and B2ab(i,ii,iii,iv,v), based on its extent of occurrence, area of occupancy, the number of locations at which this species is present, and the number of mature individuals. D. nitida is present within the Kilum-Ijim Forest, a protected area, however, other populations occur in unprotected areas that are at risk of deforestation due to agriculture and logging.
