= Astropanax mannii =

Conservation status
- Vulnerable (IUCN 3.1)

Scientific classification
- Kingdom: Plantae
- Clade: Tracheophytes
- Clade: Angiosperms
- Clade: Eudicots
- Clade: Asterids
- Order: Apiales
- Family: Araliaceae
- Genus: Astropanax
- Species: A. mannii

Binomial name
- Astropanax mannii (Hook.f.) Seem. (1865)

Synonyms
- Brassaia mannii (Hook.f.) Hutch. (1967); Heptapleurum mannii (Hook.f.) Benth. & Hook.f. (1893); Paratropia mannii Hook.f. (1862); Schefflera mannii (Hook.f.) Harms in H.G.A.Engler & K.A.E.Prantl (1894); Schefflera mannii var. lancifolia Harms (1915); Sciodaphyllum mannii (Hook.f.) Seem. (1865)

Species of flowering plant

Astropanax mannii is a species of plant in the family Araliaceae. It is a large evergreen tree native to the highlands of Cameroon, Equatorial Guinea, eastern Nigeria, and São Tomé and Príncipe. Its natural habitat is tropical moist montane forests. It is threatened by habitat loss.

Astropanax mannii is known from the islands of Bioko and Annobón in Equatorial Guinea, São Tomé Island in São Tomé and Príncipe, Obudu and Mambilla in southeastern Nigeria, Mount Cameroon, Mount Kupe, and Mount Manengouba in Cameroon's Southwest Region, and Mount Oku, Bambouto Massif, and Bafut-Ngemba in Cameroon's Northwest Region.

It grows in Afromontane rain forest from 1,400 to 2,400 meters elevation.
