= Oku, Cameroon =

Coordinates: 6°11′59″N 10°31′07″E

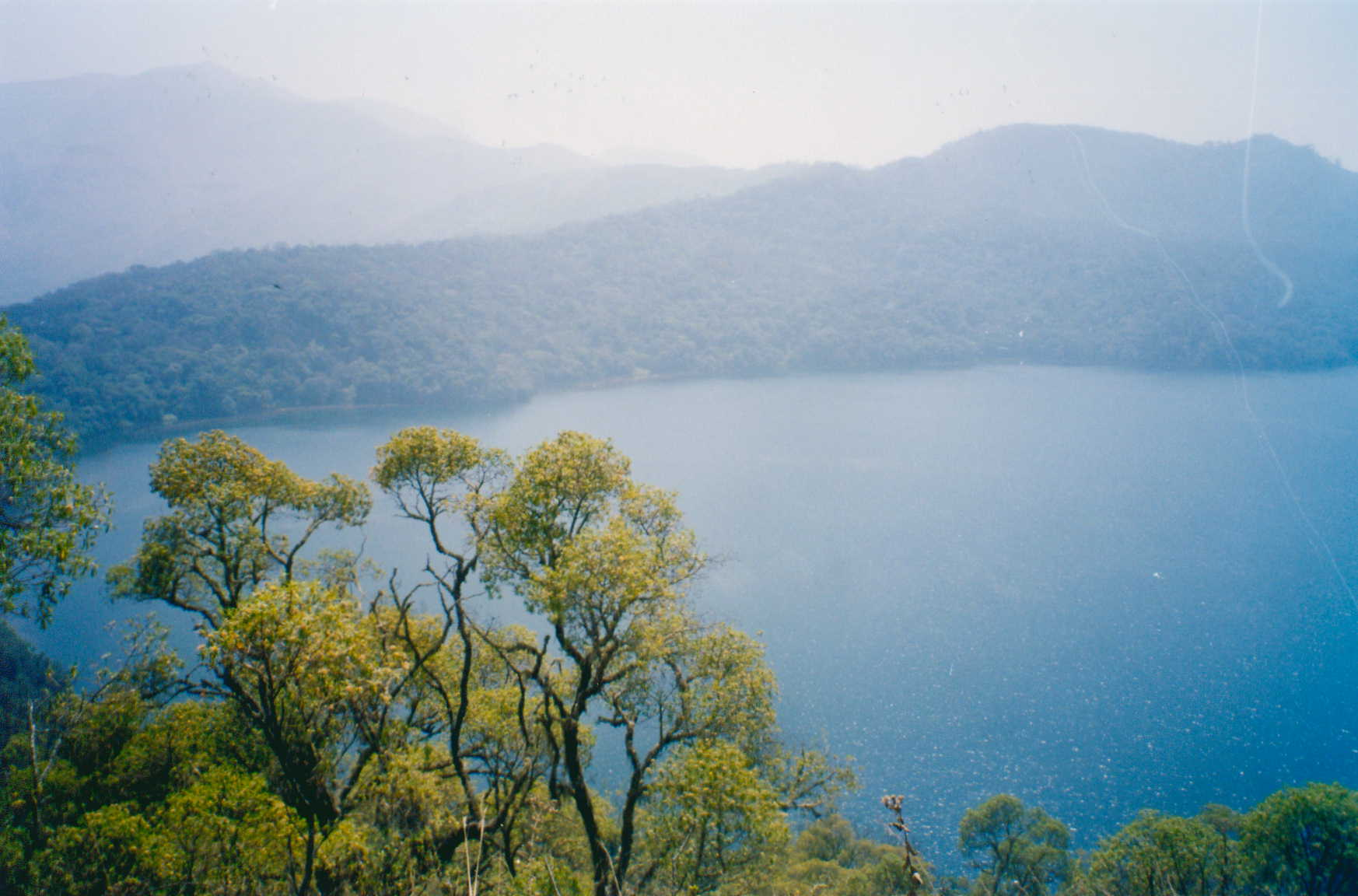
Lake Oku, Northwest Province, Cameroon

Provinces of Cameroon EN

Oku is a subdivision in North West Region, (formerly North West Province), Cameroon. The term Oku also refers to the people who live in this region ruled by a Paramount Monarch [HRM King Ngum IV. Ngum Ernest Merlin Shang] and the primary language that they speak (although English is also widely spoken). Oku is a rural area containing about 36 villages with the population of about 180,000 inhabitants . The nearest really large city is Bamenda, but Kumbo, which is closer (about 23 kilometres or 14 miles from the village of Keyon, or about 70 minutes by car, as the road network is not good and not paved), is large enough to have telephone lines and a Baptist-run hospital. Oku also has a Sub-divisional hospital. However, three mobile telephone networks (MTN, ORANGE, CAMTEL) are available in Oku. As such, mobile internet facilities are available.

== Geography and climate ==
Oku is a very mountainous region, around 1,200 metres (3,900 ft) above sea level, and thus rather cool considering its latitude. It is not cold enough for snow, but at night during the dry season temperatures drop below human comfort range. Mount Oku, a stratovolcano, reaches a height of 3011 metres (9880 feet) and is the second highest mountain of Cameroon after Mount Fako (better known as Mount Cameroon).

The broader Oku or Foumbot volcanic field also includes many scoria cones and maars, several of which are filled by crater lakes. Lake Oku is a crater lake. Two of the crater lakes, Lake Nyos and Lake Monoun, have been the subject of extensive research. Quantities of gas build up in the lakes and are occasionally released; being heavier than air, they pour down the mountainside and can suffocate entire villages. Some of the locals believe that a god lives in the lake and must be appeased.

The region is an important one for biodiversity, especially the Kelum mountain Forest.

Oku has many well graded earth road linking its various villages and neighbouring subdivisions like Noni, Babessi and Kumbo central, although none of them would be called good by most Westerners. Oku has recently got a road link through Babungo from Bamenda. One can now take two hours from Bamenda through Ibal Oku, Mbockevuh, Mawes*lake oku* through Tolon, Chiar, Ikal to Elak and to Banso.

== Economy ==
Oku is characterized by subsistence farming. There is a shortage of arable land, and the people farm even the steep hillsides. A typical practice is to plant beans, corn, and potatoes together in the same furrows.

There is also a lot of bee farming in Oku, and Oku is the only area in the whole of Cameroon that produces the natural white honey. The Oku Honey Cooperative manage and sell what bee farmers harvest. Oku white honey is produced in the nationally protected forest of Kilum Ijim near Mount Oku. Rising up to 2,000 meters above sea level, the Kilum Ijim forest is a rich, diverse ecosystem covering over 20,000 hectares. Two plants that yield white flowers in particular - Astropanax abyssinicus and Nuxia congesta - work in combination with the environment help give Oku white honey its unique properties, especially its creamy white color.

With funding from AFD, support from CIRAD, and implementation by OAPI, Cameroon was the first country in Africa to have protected geographical indication (PGI) registered, of which Oku white honey was one of the first registrations made in 2013. To ensure a consistent high level of quality, the PGI enumerates specific standards for how Oku white honey is produced. Beehive construction, designated locations in the forest for beehive installation, and required equipment and practices for harvesting honey all have requirements that must be followed. Once the honey is transferred from the forest, specific processing techniques are also adhered to. Such practices include refraining from harvesting during rain, ensuring the use of clean and dry buckets to transfer the honey, and processing the honey in a prescribed, traditional method. Notwithstanding various challenges such as deforestation from logging that threatens the Kilum Ijim forest and the bees’ habitat, the Oku white honey PGI has brought increased awareness to the product. In 2014 between eight and ten metric tons of Oku white honey were produced annually. Only a few years after the Geographical Indication was registered, sale prices per kilogram have increased by up to 40 percent and hundreds of new apiculture NGOs, SMEs, and other groups have sprung up. As of 2014, one liter of processed Oku white honey commanded a price of FCFA 4,000, whereas before the PGI one liter sold for only FCFA 1,500.

== Religion ==
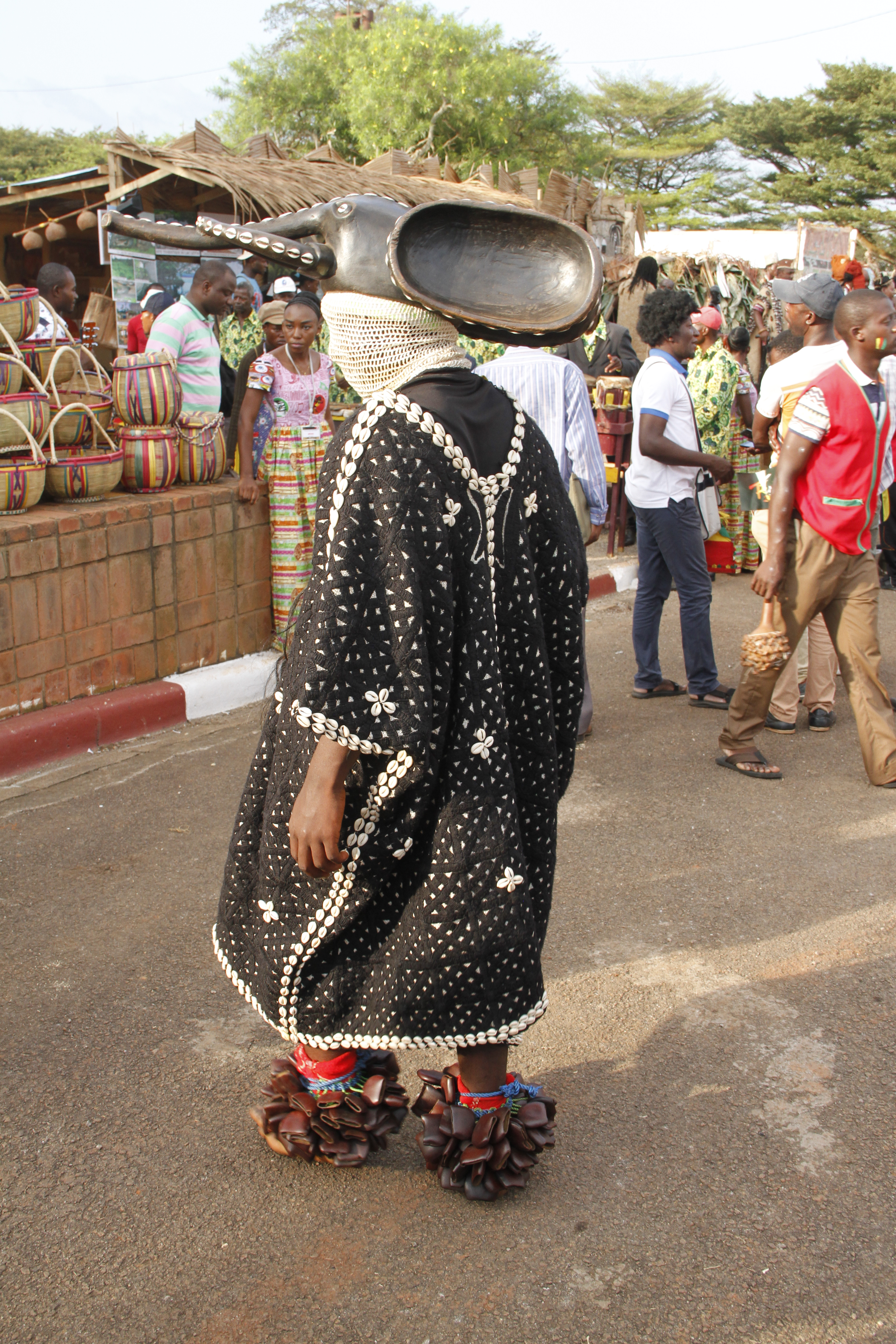
Commercialized version of an Oku elephant juju, member of a masker society which still appears for death ceremonies.

The religion of the region is predominantly a mixture of assorted local traditional beliefs (chiefly ancestor worship, also animism and paganism) with diluted forms of Christianity (mostly Baptist and Catholic, but also Lutheran and Charismatic; the Church of the Brethren are also represented).

== Administration ==
Oku is one among the 360 Sub Divisions in Cameroon. A Sub Division is a third level administrative unit and is underneath a division. It is headed by Divisional Officers. Previous Divisional Officers in Oku have included:

Nkwenti Simon Doh

Awa Fonka Augustine

Kamdem Andre

Julius Nyamkemah Fondong

Eware Emmanuel Takem

Fodzenmbah Maurice

Ngang Martin

Patrick Pelopuh Lienwotue

Orock Benjamin

Sunkekang Penanje

== Tradition and the Church ==
As of 2004, the former Fon (i.e., the traditional king of the people, but with no formal political power), who has a Baptist background, was attempting some religious reforms, to move the people away from some of the more un-Christian traditional practices; these reforms have met with considerable resistance given that the present fon (Fon Sentieh II).

The shrines in Oku are Lumetu, Yicham, Wuchia. Lumetu is famous because it houses the second grave of the legendary Mnkong Moteh. An example of Oku palaces is the Mbokenkfey palace (NtokeMbokenkfey).
