= Nganha =

Ngan-ha
- Village
- Location in Cameroon
- Coordinates: 7.435856°N 13.926736°E
- Country: Cameroon
- Region: Adamawa
- Time zone: UTC+1 (WAT)

Nganha is a commune in Cameroon. It has a population between 3,000 and 5,000. It is about 10 kilometres (6.2 mi) northwest of the summit of Tchabal Nganha, a large stratovolcano on the Ngaoundere Plateau, a highland area in the Adamawa Region of Cameroon.

== See also ==
- Communes of Cameroon
