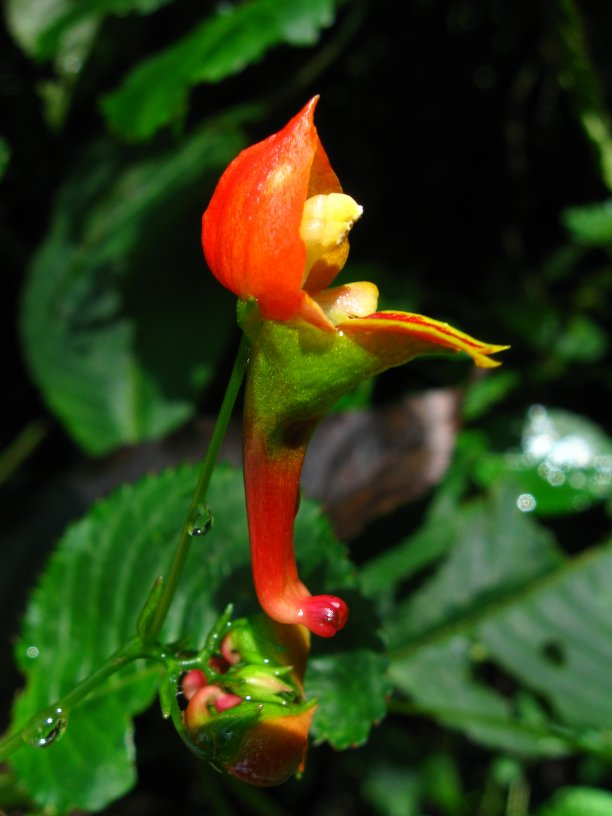

Conservation status
- Vulnerable (IUCN 3.1)

Scientific classification
- Kingdom: Plantae
- Clade: Tracheophytes
- Clade: Angiosperms
- Clade: Eudicots
- Clade: Asterids
- Order: Ericales
- Family: Balsaminaceae
- Genus: Impatiens
- Species: I. sakeriana

Binomial name
- Impatiens sakeriana Hook.f. (1863)

= Impatiens sakeriana =

Species of flowering plant

Impatiens sakeriana is a perennial species of flowering plant in the family Balsaminaceae. It is native to Cameroon and Equatorial Guinea and grows in mountain forest understory habitat at elevations up to 3000 meters. I. sakeriana is most often cited for its role in sunbird pollination. It can be locally common in parts of its range, but its habitat is threatened by agriculture.

== Morphology ==
Impatiens sakeriana is a shrub with a maximum height of 3-4 meters, though it is typically shorter than this.

The flowers possess red and yellow standard petals with large blotches of deep crimson. They also possess characteristic backward pointing spurs that may extend up to 2.5 cm toward the supporting pedicel. These are present throughout the entire year.

The leaves grow in whorls of 3–8, although they occasionally grow in opposite configuration, and are roughly 5-15 cm in length. They are oblong-lanceolate in shape, with crenated or serrated edges with short cilia on the teeth or within the crenatures. The cilia traps tiny air bubbles, giving the leaves a silvery sheen that becomes pronounced when they are held under water.

== Distribution ==
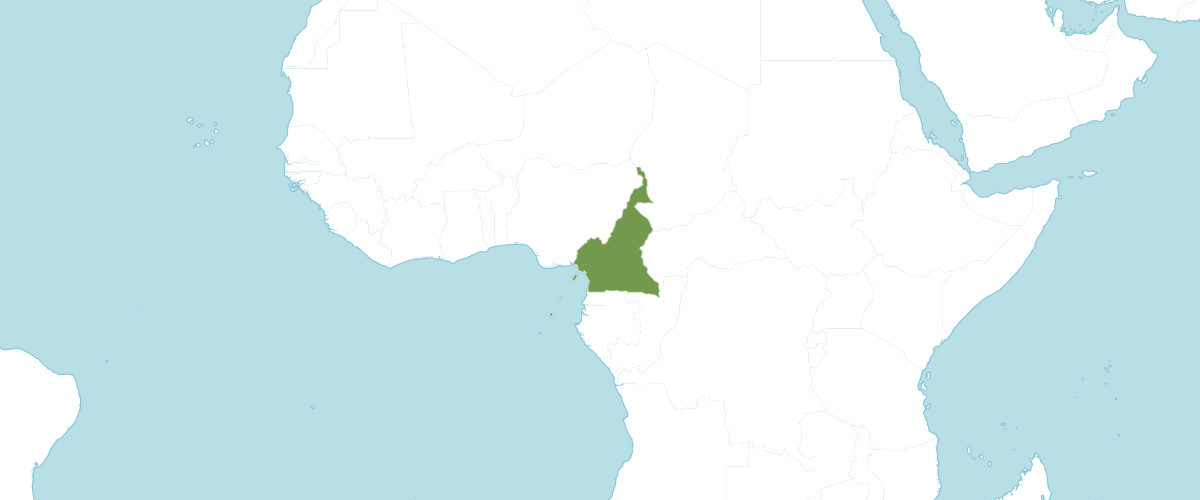
The country of Cameroon in Africa

Impatiens sakeriana is endemic along the Cameroon Line of volcanoes found in tropical west Africa. It can be found on terrestrial Mount Cameroon, as well as the island of Bioko. Much of the distribution of Impatiens sakeriana is limited due to human disturbance in tropical Africa, and may become extinct in the following years.

== Habitat and ecology ==
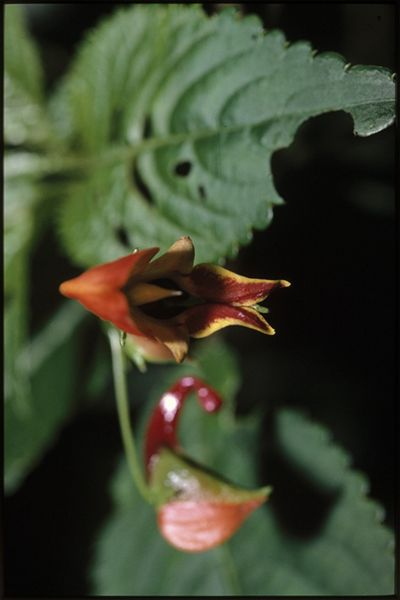
A top down view of Impatiens sakeriana

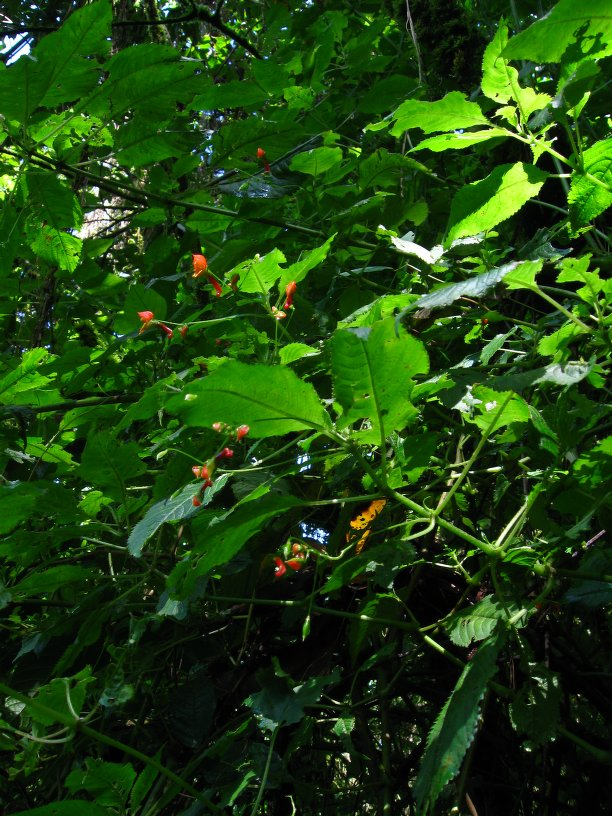
Impatiens sakeriana herbaceous bush

Impatiens sakeriana is a perennial species found in moist, shady regions of montane rainforests, particularly along stream sides and occasionally in edge habitat ranging from 900 to 3000 meters above sea level. It is found at the highest elevation of all Impatiens in the highlands of Cameroon. I. sakeriana is adapted to grow on andisols, which is usually moist because of the high rainfall and humidity and their high capacity to retain water. The mean monthly air temperature varies from 27 to 35°C.

Typical plants that I. sakeriana associates with in the Northwest Region of Cameroon include Astropanax abyssinicus, Bersama abyssinica, Syzygium guineense, and Ixora foliosa.

== Reproduction ==
Impatiens sakeriana supports red inflorescences, a color characteristic of Ornithophily. Each inflorescence supports two protandrous flowers, which begin with a 3–4 day male phase, before converting to a female phase for a similar length of time. The long peduncles (which range from 3.7-11.7 cm) and pedicels(which range from 1-2.6 cm) are oriented outward into the free space around the plant. Flowers that orient themselves away from the plant are considered a characteristic of plants pollinated by hovering birds.

=== Pollination ===
It has been shown that the sunbirds Cyanomitra oritis and Cinnyris reichenowi are the primary pollinators of I. sakeriana, with insects being at most a minor contributor. Cyanomitra oritis in particular is an effective pollinator and is syntopic with I. sakeriana, while Cinnyris reichenowi frequently will engage in flower piercing and nectar thievery. It is hypothesized that the adaptations associated with ornithophily present in this plant may have evolved to reduce the effectiveness of nectar robbing, leaving only hovering pollinators with access to the nectar. The anthers, which are located inside of the corolla, allows the pollen to be placed onto the head of visiting birds, but not those that pierce the base.

== Etymology ==
Its specific epithet sakeriana honors Alfred Saker, an English missionary who accompanied explorer Richard Francis Burton and botanist Gustav Mann on their ascent of Mount Cameroon in 1861.

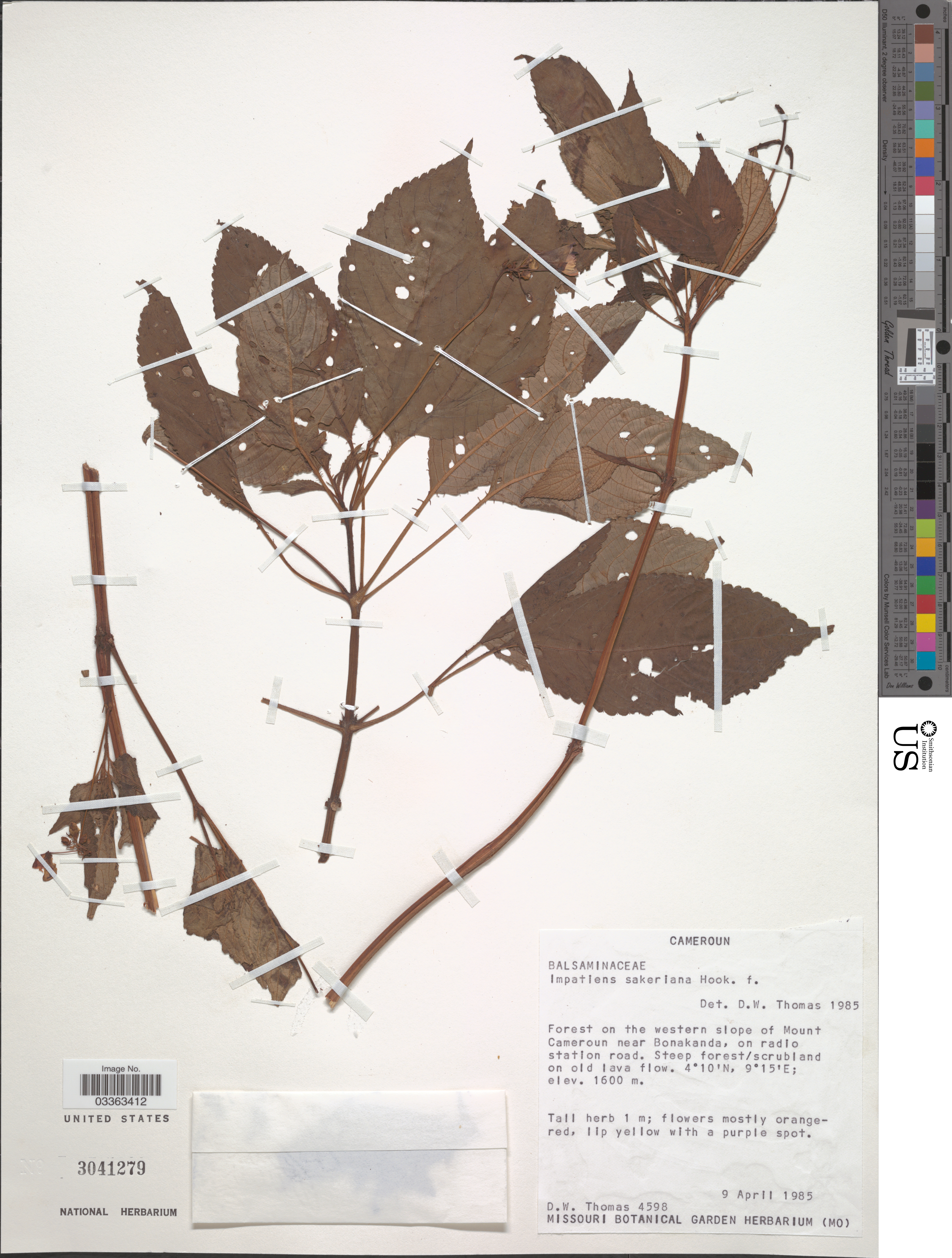
