= Wolterstorffina mirei =

Conservation status
- Endangered (IUCN 3.1)

Scientific classification
- Kingdom: Animalia
- Phylum: Chordata
- Class: Amphibia
- Order: Anura
- Family: Bufonidae
- Genus: Wolterstorffina
- Species: W. mirei

Binomial name
- Wolterstorffina mirei (Perret, 1971)

Synonyms
- Nectophrynoides mirei Perret, 1971

Species of amphibian

Wolterstorffina mirei is a species of toad in the family Bufonidae. It is endemic to Cameroon and known from Mount Oku and the Bamboutos Mountains.

Its natural habitats are montane grassland, and that in the dry season, areas near streams and small watercourses in bamboo forest. Scientists observed this toad between 2200 and 2700 meters above sea level.

Scientists believe this toad may live in one protected place, the Mount Oku Faunal Reserve.

It is threatened by habitat loss caused by fire, overgrazing, and agriculture.
