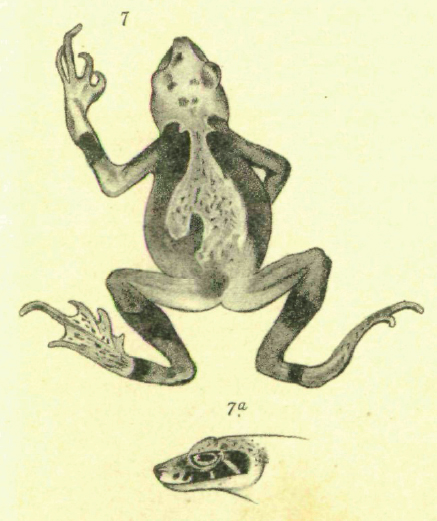

Conservation status
- Critically Endangered (IUCN 3.1)

Scientific classification
- Kingdom: Animalia
- Phylum: Chordata
- Class: Amphibia
- Order: Anura
- Family: Bufonidae
- Genus: Wolterstorffina
- Species: W. parvipalmata

Binomial name
- Wolterstorffina parvipalmata (Werner, 1898)

Synonyms
- Nectophryne parvipalmata Werner, 1898

= Wolterstorffina parvipalmata =

Species of amphibian

The Cameroon Wolterstorff toad or montane forest tree toad (Wolterstorffina parvipalmata) is a species of toad in the family Bufonidae. It is found on the western and southern slopes of the Cameroon Range (including Mount Cameroon) and Yaoundé Hills in Cameroon, and on the Obudu Plateau in eastern Nigeria. Its natural habitat is closed-canopy montane forest near streams and small waterfalls. It is threatened by habitat loss. Scientists observed it between 800 and 2000 meters above sea level. It occurs in the Cross River National Park.
