= Western Highlands =

Western Highlands may refer to:

- Western Highlands Province, in Papua New Guinea
- Western High Plateau, a region of Cameroon
- The western part of the Scottish Highlands
