= Astropanax barteri =

Conservation status
- Least Concern (IUCN 3.1)

Scientific classification
- Kingdom: Plantae
- Clade: Tracheophytes
- Clade: Angiosperms
- Clade: Eudicots
- Clade: Asterids
- Order: Apiales
- Family: Araliaceae
- Genus: Astropanax
- Species: A. barteri

Binomial name
- Astropanax barteri Seem. (1865)

Synonyms
- Synonymy: Heptapleurum barteri (Seem.) Hiern (1877); Schefflera barteri (Seem.) Harms (1894); Sciodaphyllum barteri (Seem.) Seem. (1865); Astropanax baikiei Seem. (1865); Heptapleurum baikiei (Seem.) Hiern (1877); Heptapleurum dananense A.Chev. (1912); Heptapleurum scandens Hiern (1877), nom. illeg.; Schefflera baikiei (Seem.) Harms in H.G.A.Engler & K.A.E.Prantl (1894); Schefflera dananensis (A.Chev.) Harms ex Engl. (1921); Schefflera henriquesiana Harms ex Henriq. (1917); Schefflera hierniana Harms in H.G.A.Engler & K.A.E.Prantl (1894); Schefflera ledermannii Harms (1915); Sciodaphyllum baikiei (Seem.) Seem. (1865)

Species of plant

Astropanax barteri is a species of plant in the family Araliaceae.

It is native to tropical Africa. According to Plants of the World Online, Astropanax barteri is distributed in West Africa (Guinea, Sierra Leone, Liberia, Ivory Coast, and Nigeria), west-central Africa (Cameroon, Equatorial Guinea, the Gulf of Guinea Islands, Gabon, Republic of the Congo, Democratic Republic of the Congo, and Burundi), and Angola. The IUCN Red List records a narrower range for the species (as Schefflera hierniana) in Equatorial Guinea (Bioko island) and in Cameroon, including Mount Cameroon, Belo to Lake Oku in Northwest Region, the Rumpi Hills in Southwest Region, the Bakossi Mountains, the Lebialem Highlands at Fosimondi.

It grows in humid evergreen lowland rain forest and Afromontane rain forest, including gallery and swampy forests, from 100 to 2,200 metres (330 to 7,220 ft) elevation. It is threatened by habitat loss.
