= Ischnia aurescens =

Scientific classification
- Kingdom: Animalia
- Phylum: Arthropoda
- Class: Insecta
- Order: Coleoptera
- Suborder: Polyphaga
- Infraorder: Cucujiformia
- Family: Cerambycidae
- Genus: Ischnia
- Species: I. aurescens

Binomial name
- Ischnia aurescens Breuning, 1969

Species of beetle

Ischnia aurescens is a species of beetle in the family Cerambycidae. It was described by Stephan von Breuning in 1969. It is known from the Bamboutos Mountains, Cameroon.

Ischnia aurescens measure 16 mm (0.63 in) in length.
