= Ischnia okuensis =

Scientific classification
- Kingdom: Animalia
- Phylum: Arthropoda
- Class: Insecta
- Order: Coleoptera
- Suborder: Polyphaga
- Infraorder: Cucujiformia
- Family: Cerambycidae
- Genus: Ischnia
- Species: I. okuensis

Binomial name
- Ischnia okuensis Breuning, 1973

Synonyms
- Ischnia okuensis m. miredoxa Teocchi, 1988; Ischnia rotundipennis Breuning, 1977; Ischniomimus mirei Breuning, 1977

Species of beetle

Ischnia okuensis is a species of beetle in the family Cerambycidae. It was described by Stephan von Breuning in 1973. It is known from Cameroon.

Ischnia okuensis measure 14–18 mm (0.55–0.71 in) in length.
