= Astropanax procumbens =

Conservation status
- Critically Endangered (IUCN 3.1)

Scientific classification
- Kingdom: Plantae
- Clade: Embryophytes
- Clade: Tracheophytes
- Clade: Spermatophytes
- Clade: Angiosperms
- Clade: Eudicots
- Clade: Asterids
- Order: Apiales
- Family: Araliaceae
- Genus: Astropanax
- Species: A. procumbens

Binomial name
- Astropanax procumbens (Hemsl.) Lowry, G.M.Plunkett, Gostel & Frodin

Synonyms
- Geopanax procumbens Hemsl. (1909); Schefflera procumbens (Hemsl.) F.Friedmann (1986)

Species of flowering plant

Astropanax procumbens is a species of plant in the family Araliaceae. It is endemic to Seychelles and now confined to six small areas on Silhouette Island at elevations between 400 and 700 metres (1,300 and 2,300 ft). This species has now become extinct on Mahé.

Astropanax procumbens is a climbing epiphyte, with gray bark, palmate leaves on petioles up to 20 cm (7.9 in) in length, and cream-colored, globular fruits in clusters.
