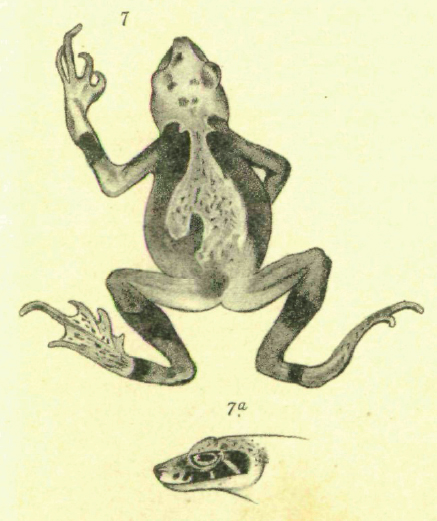

Scientific classification
- Domain: Eukaryota
- Kingdom: Animalia
- Phylum: Chordata
- Class: Amphibia
- Order: Anura
- Family: Bufonidae
- Genus: Wolterstorffina; Mertens, 1939

Type species
- Nectophryne parvipalmata Werner, 1898

Diversity
- 3 species (see text)

= Wolterstorffina =

Genus of amphibians

Wolterstorffina, also known as Wolterstorff toads, is a genus of "true toads" (family Bufonidae) native to Nigeria and Cameroon. Its sister taxon is either genus Werneria or the clade Werneria+Nectophryne. The name of the genus honours German geologist and herpetologist Willy Wolterstorff.

== Species ==
The three species are:

- Wolterstorffina chirioi Boistel & Amiet, 2001
- Wolterstorffina mirei (Perret, 1971) Mount Oku Wolterstorff toad
- Wolterstorffina parvipalmata (Werner, 1898) Cameroon Wolterstorff toad
