= Cameroon line =

Chain of volcanoes in the Gulf of Guinea

Coordinates: 3°30′0″N 8°42′0″E

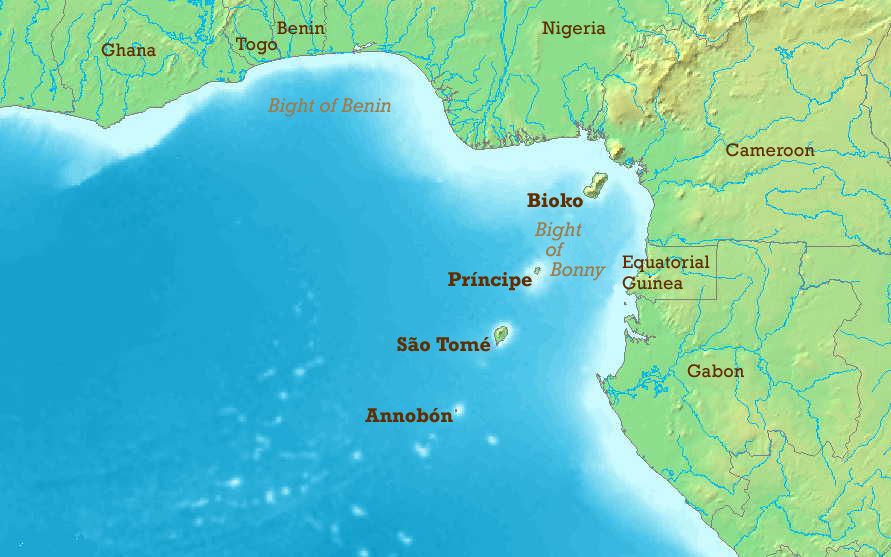
Map of the Gulf of Guinea, showing the chain of islands formed by the Cameroon volcanic line

The Cameroon line (French: Ligne du Cameroun, Portuguese: Linha dos Camarões, Spanish: cordillera de Camerún) is a 1,600 km (1,000 mi) long chain of volcanoes that includes islands in the Gulf of Guinea and mountains on the African mainland, from Mount Cameroon on the coast towards Lake Chad on the northeast. They form a natural border between eastern Nigeria and the West Region of Cameroon. The islands, which span the equator, have tropical climates and are home to many unique plant and bird species. The mainland mountain regions are much cooler than the surrounding lowlands, and also contain unique and ecologically important environments.

The Cameroon volcanic line is geologically unusual in extending through both the ocean and the continental crust. Various hypotheses have been advanced by different geologists to explain the line.

== Geography ==
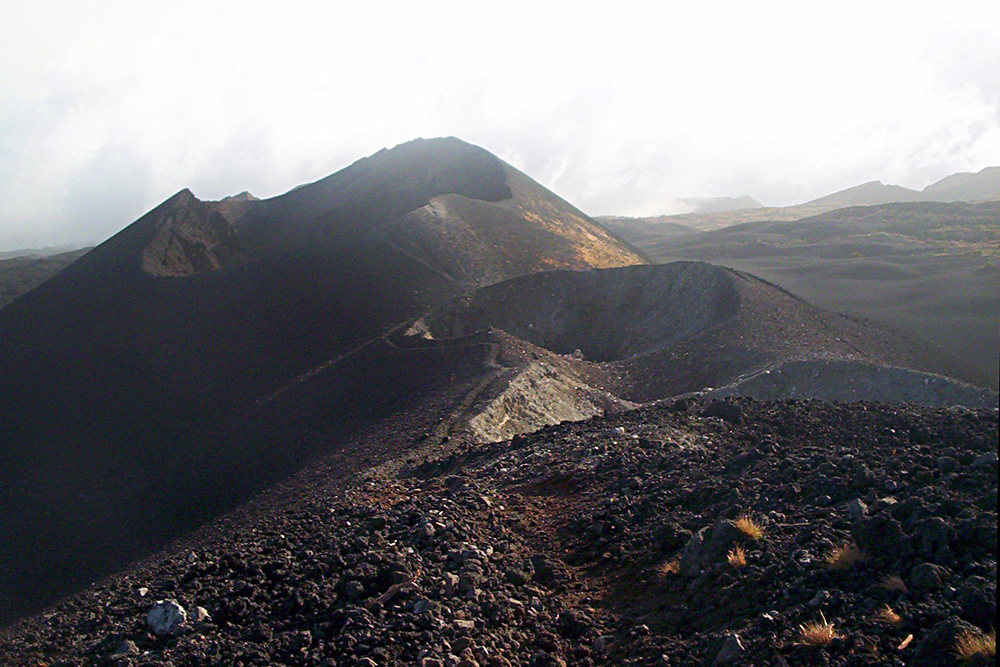
Mount Cameroon craters left after the eruptions in 2000

In the Gulf of Guinea, the Cameroon line consists of six offshore volcanic swells that have formed islands or seamounts. From the southwest to the northeast the island groups are Annobón (or Pagalu), São Tomé, Príncipe and Bioko. Two large seamounts lie between São Tomé and Príncipe, and between Príncipe and Bioko.

On the mainland, the line starts with Mount Cameroon and extends northeast in a range known as the Western High Plateau, home to the Cameroonian Highlands forests. Volcanic swells further inland are Manengouba, Bamboutu and the Oku Massif. East of Oku there are further volcanic mountains in the Ngaoundere Plateau, some of which appear to have similar origins.

=== Island chain ===
==== Annobón ====
The southernmost island in the chain is Annobón, also known as Pagalu, with an area of about 17.5 km^{2} (6.8 sq mi). It is an extinct volcano that rises from deep water to 598 m (1,962 ft) above sea level. The island belongs to Equatorial Guinea.

The average temperature is 26.1 °C (79.0 °F), with little seasonal variation. Most rain falls from November to May, with annual precipitation averaging 1,196 mm (47.1 in) - less than on the mainland. Annobón has lush valleys and steep mountains, covered with rich woods and luxuriant vegetation.

The small population lives in one community, practicing some agriculture but mainly living by fishing.

==== São Tomé ====
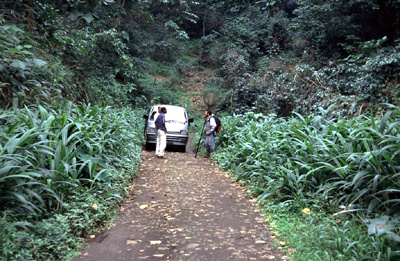
Rainforest trekking is one of São Tomé's attractions

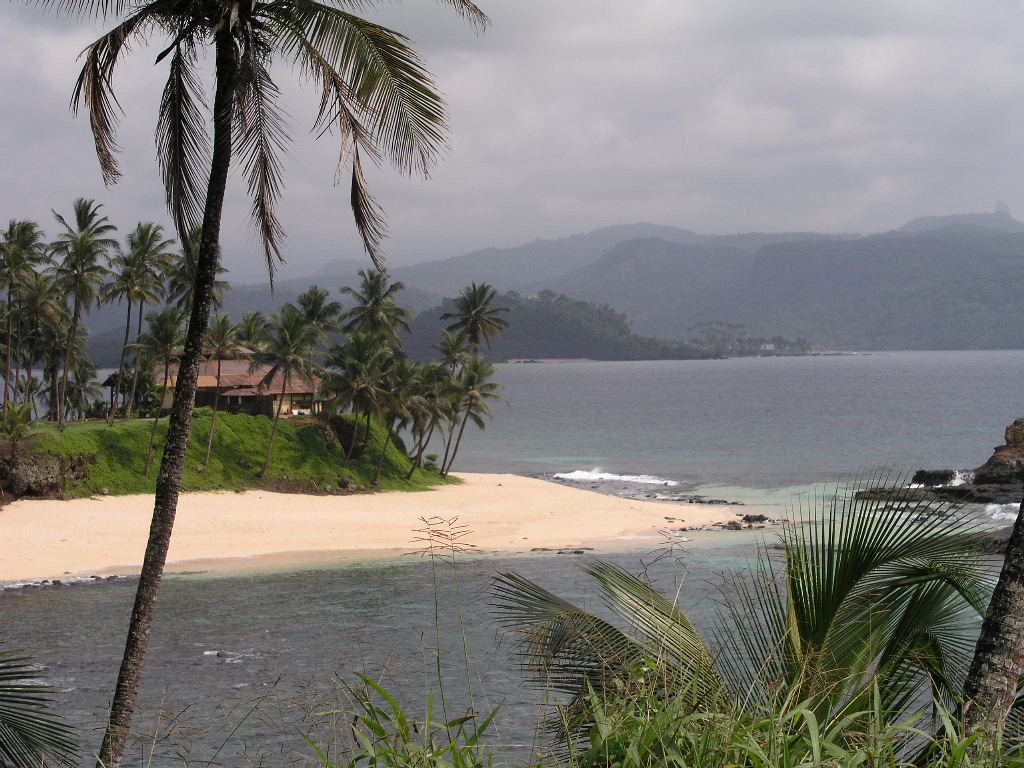
Beach scenery on São Tomé.

São Tomé island is 854 km^{2} (330 sq mi) in area, lying almost on the equator. The entire island is a massive shield volcano which rises from the floor of the Atlantic Ocean, over 3,000 m (10,000 ft) below sea level, and reaches 2,024 m (6,640 ft) above sea level in the Pico de São Tomé. The oldest rock on São Tomé is 13 million years old. Most of the lava that has erupted over the last million years has been basalt. The youngest dated rock on the island is about 100,000 years old, but numerous more recent cinder cones are found on the southeast side of the island.

Due to the prevailing southwesterly winds, there is great variability in rainfall. In the rain shadow to the northeast of São Tomé the vegetation is dry savannah, with only 60 cm (24 in) of rain each year. By contrast, the lush south and west of the island receive about 6 m (20 ft) of rain, mostly falling in March and April. The climate is hot and humid with the rainy season from October to May. The higher slopes of the island are forested and form part of the Obo National Park. São Tomé has never been connected to Africa, and therefore has many unique plants and birds. Of the bird species, 16 are endemic and six are near endemic, of which four are only shared with Príncipe. Six species are considered vulnerable, and three are critically endangered (the São Tomé ibis, São Tomé fiscal and São Tomé grosbeak). Schistometopum thomense, a bright yellow species of caecilian, is endemic to São Tomé.

As of 2010, São Tomé and Príncipe, an independent nation, had an estimated population of 167,000, most of whom lived on São Tomé island. The main language is Portuguese, but there are many speakers of Forro and Angolar (Ngola), two Portuguese-based creole languages. The economy is mainly based on tourism. Agriculture is important near the north and east coasts, with the chief exports being cocoa, coffee, copra, and palm products. There are large reserves of oil in the ocean between Nigeria and São Tomé which have not yet been exploited.

==== Príncipe ====
Príncipe is the smaller of the two major islands of São Tomé and Príncipe, with an area of 136 km^{2} (53 sq mi). Volcanic activity stopped around 15.7 million years ago, and the island has been deeply eroded apart from spectacular towers of phonolite. The island is surrounded by smaller islands including Ilheu Bom Bom, Ilhéu Caroço, Tinhosa Grande and Tinhosa Pequena, and lies in ocean 3,000 m (9,800 ft) deep. It rises in the south to 946 m (3,104 ft) at Pico de Príncipe, in a thickly forested area within the Obo National Park. The north and centre of the island were formerly plantations but have largely reverted to forest. As with São Tomé, the island has always been isolated from the mainland and therefore has many unique species of plants and animals, including six endemic birds.

Príncipe has a population of around 5,000 people. Other than Portuguese, some speak Principense or Lunguyê with a few Forro speakers.

==== Bioko ====
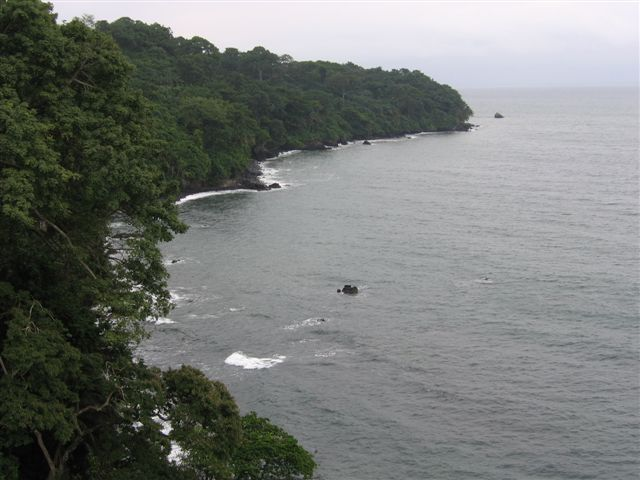
Coastline of Bioko

Bioko is just 32 km (20 mi) off the coast of Cameroon, on the continental shelf. The island used to be the end of a peninsula attached to the mainland, but was cut off when sea levels rose 10,000 years ago at the end of the last glaciation. With an area of 2,017 km^{2} (779 sq mi) it is the largest island in the Cameroon line.

Bioko has three basaltic shield volcanoes, joining at the lower levels. San Carlos is 2,260 m (7,410 ft) high with a broad summit caldera, lying at the extreme SW of the island. The volcano dates from the Holocene age and has been active within the last 2000 years. Santa Isabel is the largest volcano at 3,007 m (9,865 ft) in height, and contains many satellite cinder cones. Three eruptions have been reported from vents on the southeast flank during the late-19th and early-20th centuries. San Joaquin, also known as Pico Biao or Pico do Moka, is 2,009 m (6,591 ft) high, on the southeast of the island. The summit is cut by a small lake-filled caldera, and there is a crater lake on the NE flank. San Joaquin has been active during the last 2,000 years.

The southwestern side of Bioko is rainy for most of the year, with annual rainfall in some locations of 10,000 mm (394 in). The climate is tropical at lower altitudes, becoming about 1 °C (1.8 °F) cooler for each 150 m (492 ft) of elevation. There is open canopy montane forest above 1,500 m (4,900 ft) on Pico Basilé, Gran Caldera de Luba and Pico Biao, with subalpine grassland above 2,500 m (8,200 ft). Bioko has exceptional numbers of endemic species of flora and fauna, partly due to the great range of altitudes, particularly birdlife. The montane forest is protected by the 330 km^{2} (130 sq mi) Basilé National Park and the 510 km^{2} (200 sq mi) Luba Crater Scientific Reserve. There has been little habitat loss, and the southern slopes have remained almost completely undisturbed. Although hunting pressure is rising, the fauna in the inaccessible southern part of the island is mostly intact. This includes an endemic subspecies of drill, Mandrillus leucophaeus poensis.

Bioko is a part of Equatorial Guinea. The island has a population of 334,463 inhabitants (2015 Census), most of whom are Bubi. The rest of the population are Fernandinos, Spaniards and immigrants from Río Muni, Nigeria and Cameroon. Cocoa production was once the main export, but has declined in recent years. Farming, fishing and logging remain important. Natural gas is produced in offshore wells, processed on the island and exported via tanker.

=== Western High Plateau ===
The Western High Plateau, also called the Western Highlands or the Bamenda Grassfields, continues the Cameroon line into the mainland of Cameroon. The plateau rises in steps from the west. To the east, it terminates in mountains that range in height from 1,000 m (3,300 ft) to 2,500 metres (8,200 ft). The plateau gives way to the Adamawa Plateau to the northeast, a larger but less rugged region.

==== Volcanism ====
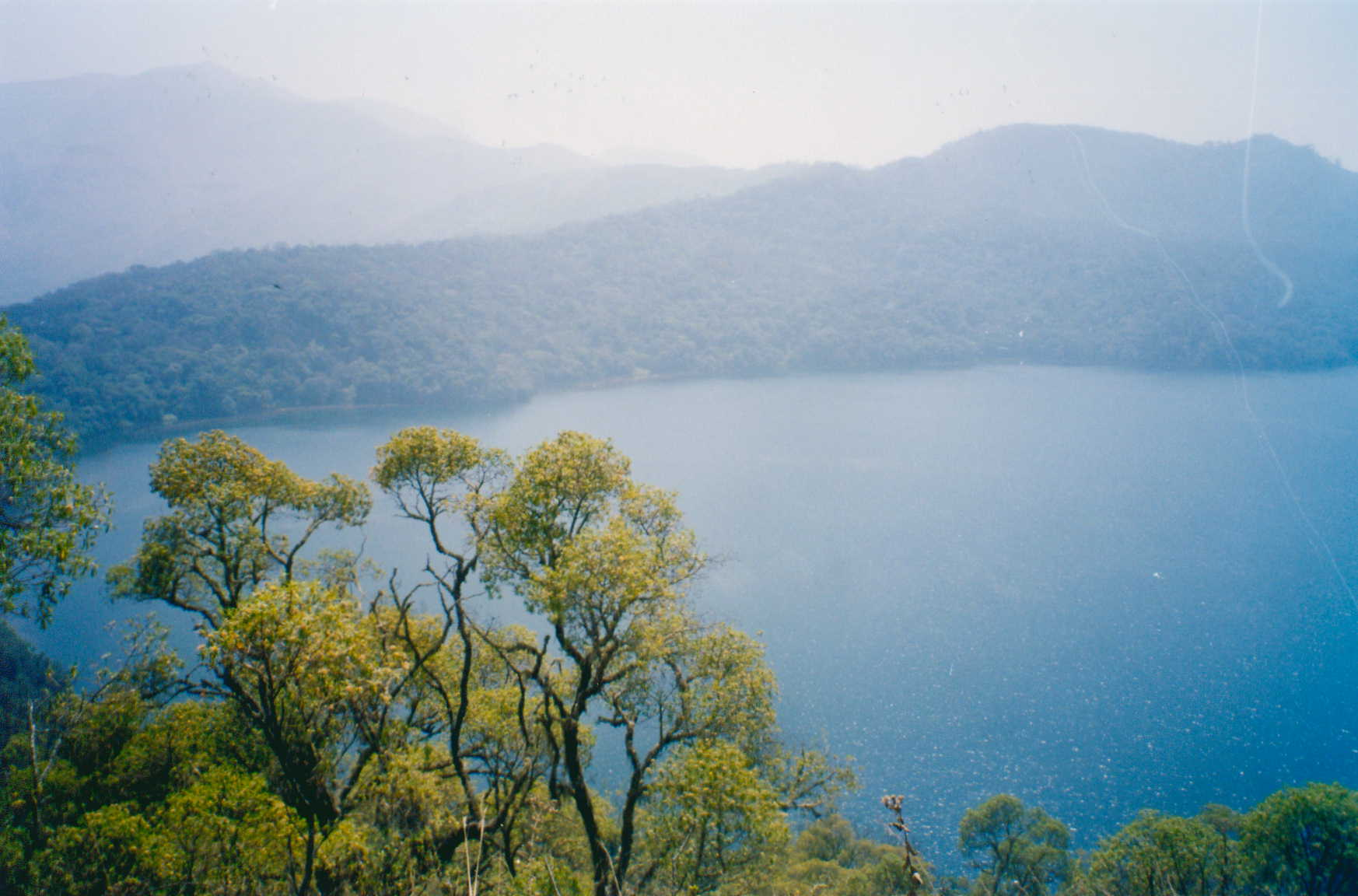
Lake Oku is a crater lake on the plateau.

The Western High Plateau features several dormant volcanoes, including the Bamboutos Mountains, Mount Oku, and Mount Kupe. Crater lakes dot the plateau, the result of dead volcanoes filling with water. This includes Lake Barombi Mbo and Lake Bermin, which have the highest number of endemic fish species per area recorded anywhere in the world.

The 4,095 m (13,435 ft) Mount Cameroon on the coastline, which may have been observed by the Carthaginian Hanno the Navigator in the 5th century BC, erupted in 2000. Further inland, the stratovolcano Mount Oku at 3,011 metres (9,879 ft) is the second highest mountain in sub-Saharan mainland West Africa. In 1986, Lake Nyos, a crater lake in the Oku volcanic plain, released a cloud of carbon dioxide gas that killed at least 1,200 people.

==== Climate ====
The region has cool temperatures, heavy rainfall, and savanna vegetation. The plateau experiences an equatorial climate with a wet season of nine months, and a dry season of three months. During the wet season, humid, prevailing monsoon winds blow in from the west and lose their moisture upon hitting the region's mountains. Average rainfall per year ranges from 1,000 mm (39 in) to 2,000 mm (79 in). High elevations give the region a cooler climate than the rest of Cameroon. For example, the average temperature at Dschang in the West Province is 20 °C (68 °F). Toward the north, rainfall levels are reduced as the Sudan climate becomes predominant.

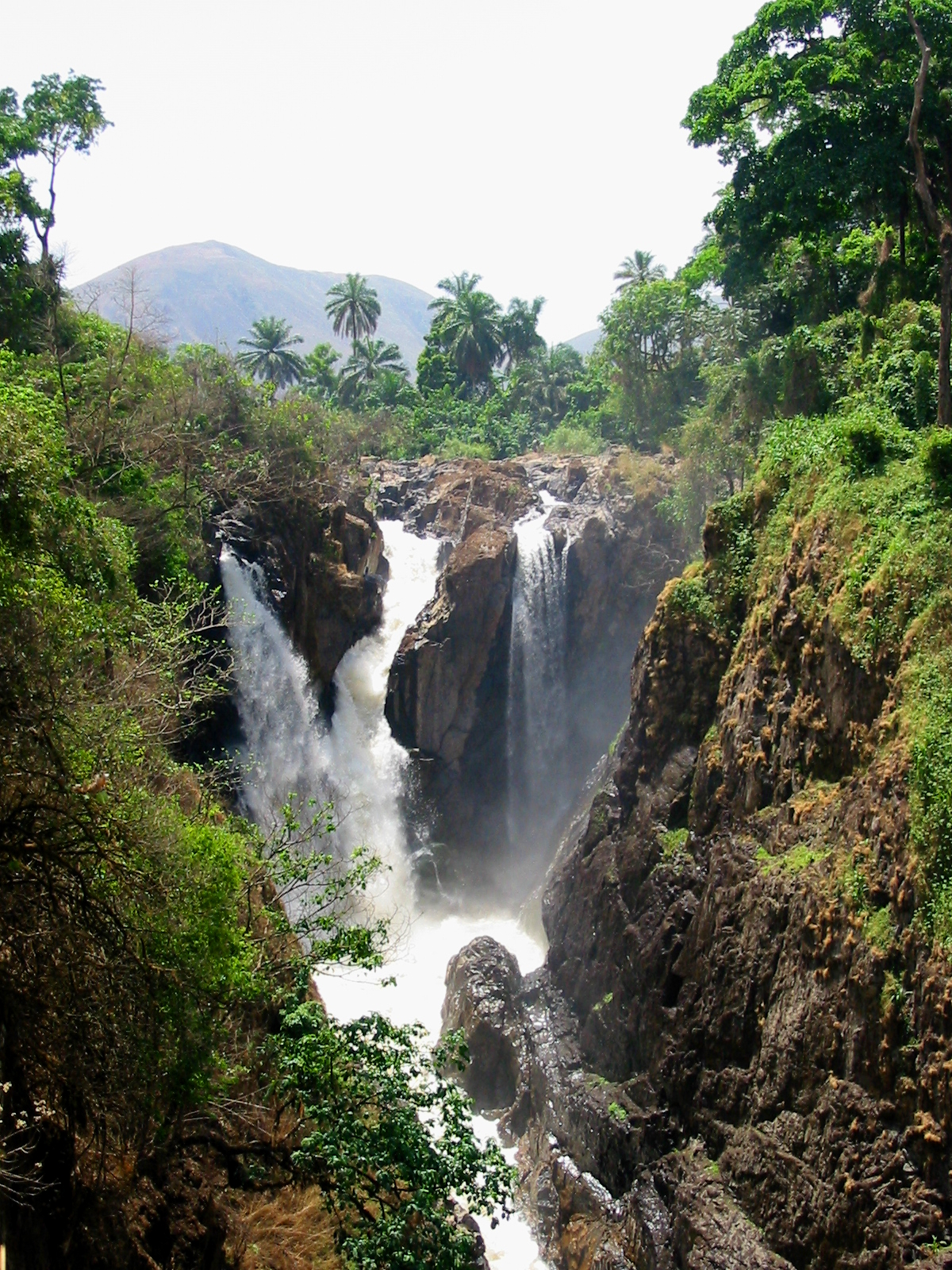
Menchum Falls in the Northwest Province

The Western High Plateau's relief and high rainfall make it a major watershed for Cameroon. Important rivers in the region include the Manyu, which rises in the Bamboutos Mountains and becomes the Cross River on its lower course, and the Nkam, which is known as the Wouri River on its lower course. The region gives rise to important tributaries to the Sanaga River. These rivers have a long high-water period during the wet season and a short low-water period during the dry season.

==== Environment ====
Volcanism has created fertile black and brown soils. The Western High Plateau was once heavily forested. However, repeated cutting and burning by humans has forced the forest back to areas along the waterways and has allowed grasslands to expand into the area. Sudan savanna forms the dominant vegetation. This consists of grassfields—leading to the name Bamenda grassfields around the city of Bamenda—and short shrubs and trees that shed their foliage during the dry season as a defence against brush fires and dry weather. Raffia palms grow in the valleys and depressions.

== Geology ==
Geologists disagree over which volcanic regions should be included in the Cameroon volcanic line. All definitions include the islands and the continental stretch up to Oku. Based on similarities in age and composition, some also include the Ngaoundere Plateau, which extends the line to the east in the Adamawa Plateau; the Biu plateau of Nigeria to the north of the Yola arm of the Benue Trough, and the Jos Plateau to the west of the Benue Trough.

There are varying theories for the similarities between the oceanic and continental volcanoes.

=== Surrounding plate ===
Major geographical features near Cameroon line

The Cameroon line bisects the angle where the coast of Africa makes a 90° bend from the southern coast along the west of the Congo craton and the western coast along the south of the West African craton. The coastline roughly corresponds to the coast of the Borborema geological province of northeastern Brazil, which began to separate from this part of Africa around 115 million years ago.

The Central African Shear Zone (CASZ), a lineament that extends from the Sudan to coastal Cameroon, runs under the continental section of the Cameroon line. It is visible in the Foumban Shear Zone, which was active before and during the opening of the South Atlantic in the Cretaceous period. The western end of the shear zone is obscured by the volcanoes of the Cameroon line, but based on reconstruction of the configuration of South America before it separated from Africa, the Foumban Shear Zone can be identified with the Pernambuco fault in Brazil. A major earthquake in 1986 could indicate that the shear zone is reactivating.

The Benue Trough lies to the west of the Cameroon line. The Benue Trough was formed by rifting of the central West African basement, beginning at the start of the Cretaceous era. A common explanation of the trough's formation is that it is an aulacogen, an abandoned arm of a three-armed radial rift system. The other two arms continued to spread during the break-up of Gondwana, as South America separated from Africa. During the Santonian age, around 84 million years ago, the Benue Trough underwent intense compression and folding. Since then it has been tectonically quiet.

=== Hypotheses ===
The basaltic rocks in the oceanic and continental sectors of the Cameroon line are similar in composition, although the more evolved rocks are quite distinct. The similarity in basaltic rocks may indicate they have the same source. Since the lithosphere mantle below Africa must be different in chemical and isotopic composition from the younger lithosphere below the Atlantic, one explanation is that the source is in the asthenosphere rather than in metasomatized lithosphere. A different view is that the similarities are caused by shallow contamination of the oceanic section, which could be caused by sediments from the continent or by rafted crustal blocks that were trapped in the oceanic lithosphere during the separation between South America and Africa.

According to some geologists, there is evidence that a mantle plume has existed in the region for about 140 million years, first remaining in roughly the same position while the African plate rotated above it, and then remaining stationary under the Oku area since around 66 million years ago. In this theory, the abnormal heat rising in a mantle plume would lead to melting of the upper mantle, which raises, thins and weakens the crust and facilitates rifting. This may have been repeated several times in the Benue Trough between 140 Ma and 49 Ma. One plume-related hypothesis for the later development of the Cameroon Line around 30 Ma is that it coincides with development of a shallow mantle convection system centered on the mantle plume, and is related to thinning and extension of the crust along the Cameroon line as pressures relaxed in the now stationary plate.

The traditional mantle plume hypothesis is disputed by scientists who point out that features of the region are quite different from what is predicted by that hypothesis, and that a source in a lithospheric fracture is more likely to be the explanation. One explanation for the origin of the volcanic line is likely leakage of magma from reactivated Precambrian faults, while another scenario is the rising of mantle material from African Large low-shear-velocity provinces travels under Congo Craton and through existing fractures ultimately feed the volcanic activities. The puzzling feature, that the composition of the magmas is the same both in the land volcanoes and the oceanic ones is likely explained by recent studies that show the underlying lithosphere is the same. A gravity study of the southern part of the Adamawa plateau has shown a belt of dense rocks at an average depth of 8 km running parallel to the Foumban shear zone. The material appears to be an igneous intrusion that may have accompanied reactivation of the shear zone, and may be associated with the Cameroon line.

== Sources ==
- African Bird Club. "São Tomé e Príncipe". Archived from the original on 2010-12-24.
- Appleton (1857). "Annobon". The new American cyclopaedia: a popular dictionary of general knowledge, Volume 1. p. 618.
- BBC (1986-08-21). "1986: Hundreds gassed in Cameroon lake disaster". BBC News.
- Becker, Kathleen (2008). São Tomé and Príncipe. Bradt Travel Guides. ISBN 978-1-84162-216-3.
- Burke, Kevin (2001). "Origin of the Cameroon Line of Volcano-Capped Swells" (PDF). The Journal of Geology. 109 (3): 349–362. Bibcode:2001JG....109..349B. doi:10.1086/319977. S2CID 44001852.
- "Conserving Afromontane Forest in the Bamenda Highlands of Cameroon". BirdLife International. Archived from the original on 2010-12-14.
- Dorbath, C.; Dorbath, L.; Fairhead, D.; Stuart, G. W. (1986). "A teleseismic delay time study across the Central African Shear Zone in the Adamawa region of Cameroon, West Africa". Geophys. J. R. Astron. Soc. 86 (3): 751–766. Bibcode:1986GeoJ...86..751D. doi:10.1111/j.1365-246X.1986.tb00658.x.
- "Equatorial Guinea". CIA. Archived from the original on January 9, 2021.
- Fa, John E. (1991). Conservación de los ecosistemas forestales de Guinea Ecuatorial. IUCN. ISBN 2-88032-993-0.
- Fitton, J. G. (1987). "The Cameroon line, West Africa: a comparison between oceanic and continental alkaline volcanism". Special Publications. 30 (1). Geological Society, London: 273–291. Bibcode:1987GSLSP..30..273F. doi:10.1144/GSL.SP.1987.030.01.13. S2CID 128847931.
- Foulger, G.R. (2010). Plates vs. Plumes: A Geological Controversy. Wiley-Blackwell. ISBN 978-1-4051-6148-0. Archived from the original on 2017-11-25.
- Gwanfogbe, Mathew; Meligui, Ambrose; Moukam, Jean; Nguoghia, Jeanette (1983). Geography of Cameroon. Hong Kong: Macmillan Education. ISBN 0-333-36690-5.
- Maluski, H.; Coulon, C.; Popoff, M.; Baudin, P. (1995). "40Ar/39Ar chronology, petrology and geodynamic setting of Mesozoic to early Cenozoic magmatism from the Benue Trough, Nigeria". Journal of the Geological Society. 152 (2). Geological Society of London: 311–326. Bibcode:1995JGSoc.152..311M. doi:10.1144/gsjgs.152.2.0311. S2CID 128685924.
- Marzoli, A.; Piccirillo, E. M.; Renne, P. R.; Bellieni, G.; Iacumin, M.; Nyobe, J. B.; Tongwa, A. T. (1999). "The Cameroon Volcanic Line Revisited: Petrogenesis of Continental Basaltic Magmas from Lithospheric and Asthenospheric Mantle Sources". Journal of Petrology. 41 (1): 87–109. Bibcode:2000JPet...41...87M. doi:10.1093/petrology/41.1.87. hdl:11577/145467.
- McColl, R. W. (2005). "Equatorial Guinea". Encyclopedia of world geography, Volume 1. Infobase Publishing. ISBN 0-8160-5786-9.
- McNeil, Donald G. Jr. (September 16, 2010). "Precursor to H.I.V. Was in Monkeys for Millenniums". The New York Times.
- "Cameroon". Global Volcanism Program. Smithsonian Institution.
- "Mount Cameroon and Bioko montane forests". Terrestrial Ecoregions. World Wildlife Fund.
- Neba, Aaron (1999). Modern Geography of the Republic of Cameroon. Bamenda: Neba Publishers.
- "Quake may have triggered Nyos disaster". New Scientist. 12 Feb 1987.
- Njonfang, Emmanuel; Nono, Alexandre; Kamgang, Pierre; Ngako, Vincent; Mbatcam, Tchoua (2008). "The Cameroon Line magmatism (Central Africa): A viewpoint". International Geological Congress.
- Obaje, N. G.; Wehner, H.; Abubakar, M. B.; Isah, M. T. (April 2004). "Nasara-I Well, Gongola Basin (Upper Benue Trough, Nigeria): Source-Rock Evaluation". Journal of Petroleum Geology. 27 (2): 191–206. Bibcode:2004JPetG..27..191O. doi:10.1111/j.1747-5457.2004.tb00053.x. S2CID 129544171.
- Ofoegbu, C. O. (1984). "A model for the tectonic evolution of the Benue Trough of Nigeria". Geologische Rundschau. 73 (3): 1007–1018. Bibcode:1984GeoRu..73.1007O. doi:10.1007/BF01820885. S2CID 129517202.
- Petters, S. W. (May 1978). "Stratigraphic Evolution of the Benue Trough and Its Implications for the Upper Cretaceous Paleogeography of West Africa". The Journal of Geology. 86 (3): 311–322. Bibcode:1978JG.....86..311P. doi:10.1086/649693. JSTOR 30061985. S2CID 129346979.
- Rankenburg, K.; Lassiter, J. C.; Brey, G. (2004). "The Role of Continental Crust and Lithospheric Mantle in the Genesis of Cameroon Volcanic Line Lavas: Constraints from Isotopic Variations in Lavas and Megacrysts from the Biu and Jos Plateaux". Journal of Petrology. 46 (1): 169–190. Bibcode:2004JPet...46..169R. doi:10.1093/petrology/egh067.
- "San Carlos". Global Volcanism Program. Smithsonian Institution.
- "Santa Isabel". Global Volcanism Program. Smithsonian Institution.
- "San Joaquin". Global Volcanism Program. Smithsonian Institution.
- "São Tomé and Principe Geography". World Factbook. CIA. 19 April 2022. Archived from the original on January 8, 2021.
- "Sao Tome". Global Volcanism Program. Smithsonian Institution.
- "São Tomé and Príncipe (Background Note)". US State Department. December 7, 2010.
- Stuart, G. W.; Fairhead, J.D.; Dorbath, L.; Dorbath, C. (1985). "CRUSTAL STRUCTURE OF THE ADAMAWA PLATEAU CAMEROON" (PDF). Revue Sciences et Techniques, Série Sciences de la Terre.
- Tatchum, C Noutchogwe; Tabod, C T; Manguelle-Dicoum, E (2006). "A gravity study of the crust beneath the Adamawa fault zone, west central Africa". Journal of Geophysics and Engineering. 3 (1): 82–89. Bibcode:2006JGE.....3...82N. doi:10.1088/1742-2132/3/1/009.
