= Tchabal Nganha =

- Location within Cameroon

Highest point
- Elevation: 1,927 m (6,322 ft)
- Prominence: 1,000 m (3,300 ft)
- Coordinates: 7°21′13″N 14°00′53″E

Geography
- Country: Cameroon
- Region: Adamawa
- Plateau: Ngaoundere

Geology
- Mountain type: Stratovolcano
- Volcanic zone: Cameroon line

Tchabal Nganha is a stratovolcano on the Ngaoundere Plateau, a highland area in the Adamawa Region of Cameroon.

== Location ==
Tchabal Nganha is a large composite volcano located within the Ngaoundere volcanic field in the east of the Adamawa Plateau. It is the only stratovolcano in the field. Nganha rises about 1,000 metres (3,300 ft) above the surrounding plateau to a height of 1,927 metres (6,322 ft) at Doïtaïa Mounts.

The Adamawa plateau is an asymmetrical horst bounded by N70°E faults and tilted to the south. The plateau has a Precambrian metamorphic basement that is intruded by granite and syenite plutons from the Paleozoic. It is partly covered by volcanic formations from the Cenozoic to Recent ages. The crust is 33 kilometres (21 mi) thick below the plateau. Although considered by many geologists to be part of the Cameroon line, the silicic volcanism of the Ngaoundere Plateau is younger (11 to 9 million years old) than silicic volcanism in the Western Highlands, with much more alkaline basalts than in the western part of the line.

== Formation ==
Basalt and trachyte rock samples from Nganha have K–Ar ages of 7.2, 7.9 and 9.8 Ma (million years). The volcano was formed in four overlapping phases. First, many basaltic lava flows erupted throughout the region, creating the generally smooth relief. Next, voluminous breccias were deposited. Most of these have been deeply eroded except where covered by later lava flows. Thick, radially distributed trachyte and phonolite flows then erupted. They have steep margins and are separated by deep and narrow valleys. Later there was basaltic activity at the summit.
