= Astropanax =

Scientific classification
- Kingdom: Plantae
- Clade: Embryophytes
- Clade: Tracheophytes
- Clade: Angiosperms
- Clade: Eudicots
- Clade: Asterids
- Order: Apiales
- Family: Araliaceae
- Subfamily: Aralioideae
- Genus: Astropanax; Seem.

Species
- See text

Synonyms
- Geopanax Hemsl.

Genus of flowering plants

Astropanax is a genus of flowering plants in the family Araliaceae, native to Tropical Africa, Madagascar, and other Indian Ocean islands. It was resurrected from Schefflera in 2017.

Fossil occurrences of the genus are known from the early Miocene (Aquitanian) Mush Valley plant assemblages of Ethiopia from 21.73 million years ago and based on leaf and leaflet compressions and pollen. Astropanax eogetem is known from a prehistoric tropical moist or wet forest surrounding a crater lake. Additional potential records of the genus are also known from the late Oligocene and Pliocene of Ethiopia, based on pollen referred to as 'Schefflera abyssinica – type' and 'Schefflera cf. S. abyssinica'.

== Species ==
The following species are accepted:

- Astropanax abyssinicus (Hochst. ex A.Rich.) Seem. – Nigeria and Cameroon, and eastern Africa from Ethiopia to Malawi
- Astropanax barteri Seem. – western and west-central Africa to Angola
- †Astropanax eogetem Pan, Jacobs, Currano, Gostel, Lowry, G.M.Plunkett, Hoffmann, Geier, et Grímsson - extinct - northwestern Ethiopia.
- Astropanax evrardii (Bamps) Lowry, G.M.Plunkett, Gostel & Frodin – Democratic Republic of the Congo
- Astropanax goetzenii (Harms) Lowry, G.M.Plunkett, Gostel & Frodin – eastern Africa from Uganda to Zimbabwe
- Astropanax humblotianus (Drake) Lowry, G.M.Plunkett, Gostel & Frodin – central Madagascar
- Astropanax kivuensis (Bamps) Lowry, G.M.Plunkett, Gostel & Frodin – eastern Democratic Republic of the Congo
- Astropanax mannii (Hook.f.) Seem. – eastern Nigeria, Cameroon, and the Gulf of Guinea Islands
- Astropanax monophyllus (Baker) Lowry, G.M.Plunkett, Gostel & Frodin – Madagascar
- Astropanax myrianthus (Baker) Lowry, G.M.Plunkett, Gostel & Frodin – Madagascar and Comoro Islands
- Astropanax polysciadius (Harms) Lowry, G.M.Plunkett, Gostel & Frodin – Madagascar, Comoro Islands, and eastern Africa from Ethiopia to northern Malawi
- Astropanax procumbens (Hemsl.) Lowry, G.M.Plunkett, Gostel & Frodin – Seychelles
- Astropanax stolzii (Harms) Lowry, G.M.Plunkett, Gostel & Frodin – Tanzania (Rungwe District)
- Astropanax tessmannii (Harms) Lowry, G.M.Plunkett, Gostel & Frodin – Gabon, Equatorial Guinea, and Democratic Republic of the Congo
- Astropanax urostachyus (Harms) Lowry, G.M.Plunkett, Gostel & Frodin – Democratic Republic of the Congo, Uganda, and Tanzania
- Astropanax volkensii (Harms) Lowry, G.M.Plunkett, Gostel & Frodin – Ethiopia, Kenya, Uganda, and Tanzania
