= Makombé River =

River in Cameroon

Coordinates: 4°34′11″N 10°09′50″E

The Makombé River is a river in Cameroon. It joins the Nkam River near Yabassi to become the Wouri River.
