= Astropanax myrianthus =

Conservation status
- Near Threatened (IUCN 3.1)

Scientific classification
- Kingdom: Plantae
- Clade: Tracheophytes
- Clade: Angiosperms
- Clade: Eudicots
- Clade: Asterids
- Order: Apiales
- Family: Araliaceae
- Genus: Astropanax
- Species: A. myrianthus

Binomial name
- Astropanax myrianthus (Baker) Lowry, G.M.Plunkett, Gostel & Frodin (2017)

Synonyms
- Cussonia myriantha Baker (1883); Neocussonia myriantha (Baker) Hutch. (1967); Schefflera myriantha (Baker) Drake (1896); Schefflera humblotii Harms (1894); Schefflera myriantha var. attenuata Bernardi (1969)

Species of flowering plant

Astropanax myrianthus is a species of plant in the family Araliaceae. It is a tree, shrub, or liana native to Madagascar and the Comoro Islands.

== Description ==
Astropanax myrianthus is a tree, epiphytic shrub, liana, or parasitic liana which grows 2 to 15 meters high.

== Range and habitat ==
Astropanax myrianthus is found in the highlands of Madagascar's Anosy, Analamanga, Vakinankaratra, Diana, Sava, and Sofia regions (former Antananarivo, Antsiranana, Mahajanga and Toliara provinces). The species' estimated extent of occurrence (EOO), calculated from 28 known collections, is 87,150 km^{2}, and its minimum estimated area of occupancy (AOO) is 92 km^{2}.

It grows in montane forest with lichens or bamboo, in remnant or patchy mountaintop forests, in open areas and partially degraded forest, and in bushland below granite outcrops, from 1,000 to 2,340 meters elevation.

== Conservation ==
At least 14 of the species' known subpopulations are threatened with habitat loss from shifting agriculture.
