= Wolterstorffina chirioi =

Conservation status
- Critically Endangered (IUCN 3.1)

Scientific classification
- Kingdom: Animalia
- Phylum: Chordata
- Class: Amphibia
- Order: Anura
- Family: Bufonidae
- Genus: Wolterstorffina
- Species: W. chirioi

Binomial name
- Wolterstorffina chirioi Boistel and Amiet, 2001

Species of amphibian

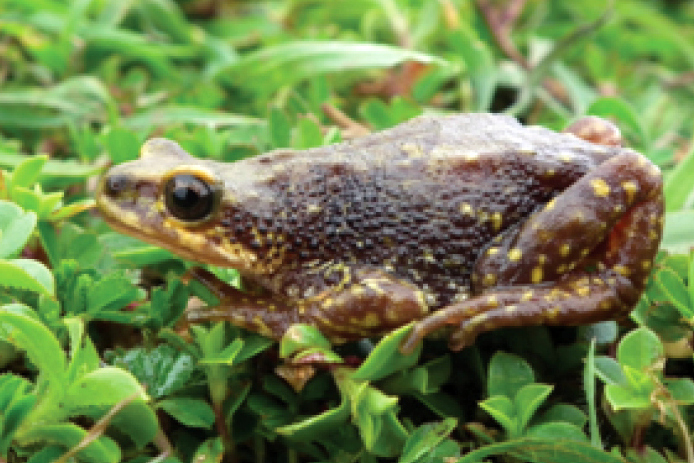
Wolterstorffina chirioi, sighted in Mount Oku, Subalpine Toad, Cameroon

Wolterstorffina chirioi is a species of toad in the family Bufonidae. It is endemic to Cameroon and known only from Mount Oku, its type locality. The specific name chirioi honours Laurent Chirio, a herpetologist from the National Museum of Natural History, France; he also collected the holotype.

== Description ==
The type series consists of two males measuring about 31 millimetres (1.2 in) and six females measuring 36–44 millimetres (1.4–1.7 in) in snout–vent length; it is a relatively large species among the Wolterstorffina. One juvenile measured 14 millimetres (0.55 in). The head is flat above. The snout is short. No tympana nor parotoid glands are present. The dorsum is smooth medially but warty on the flanks. The limbs are long and relatively slender. The outer edges of the feet are thickened.

== Habitat and conservation ==
Wolterstorffina chirioi inhabits Afro-Alpine vegetation and grassland at the summit of Mount Oku at 3,000 metres (9,800 ft) above sea level. It is believed that it does not depend on aquatic habitats for its breeding.

This species has a very restricted distribution and has been recorded only twice after its description. Its habitat is threatened by overgrazing and fire. Given its limited high-altitude range, it is potentially affected by climate change too.
