= Ischnia =

Scientific classification
- Kingdom: Animalia
- Phylum: Arthropoda
- Class: Insecta
- Order: Coleoptera
- Suborder: Polyphaga
- Infraorder: Cucujiformia
- Family: Cerambycidae
- Tribe: Pteropliini
- Genus: Ischnia; Jordan, 1903

Genus of beetles

Ischnia is a genus of longhorn beetles of the subfamily Lamiinae.

== Species ==
There are three recognized species:

- Ischnia aurescens Breuning, 1969
- Ischnia okuensis Breuning, 1973
- Ischnia picta Jordan, 1903
