= Ischnia picta =

Scientific classification
- Kingdom: Animalia
- Phylum: Arthropoda
- Class: Insecta
- Order: Coleoptera
- Suborder: Polyphaga
- Infraorder: Cucujiformia
- Family: Cerambycidae
- Genus: Ischnia
- Species: I. picta

Binomial name
- Ischnia picta Jordan, 1903

Synonyms
- Ischnia mirei Breuning, 1973

Species of beetle

Ischnia picta is a species of beetle in the family Cerambycidae. It was described by Karl Jordan in 1903. It is known from Cameroon.

Ischnia picta measure 17–19 mm (0.67–0.75 in) in length.
