= Nkam River =

River in Cameroon

Coordinates: 4°34′13″N 10°09′49″E

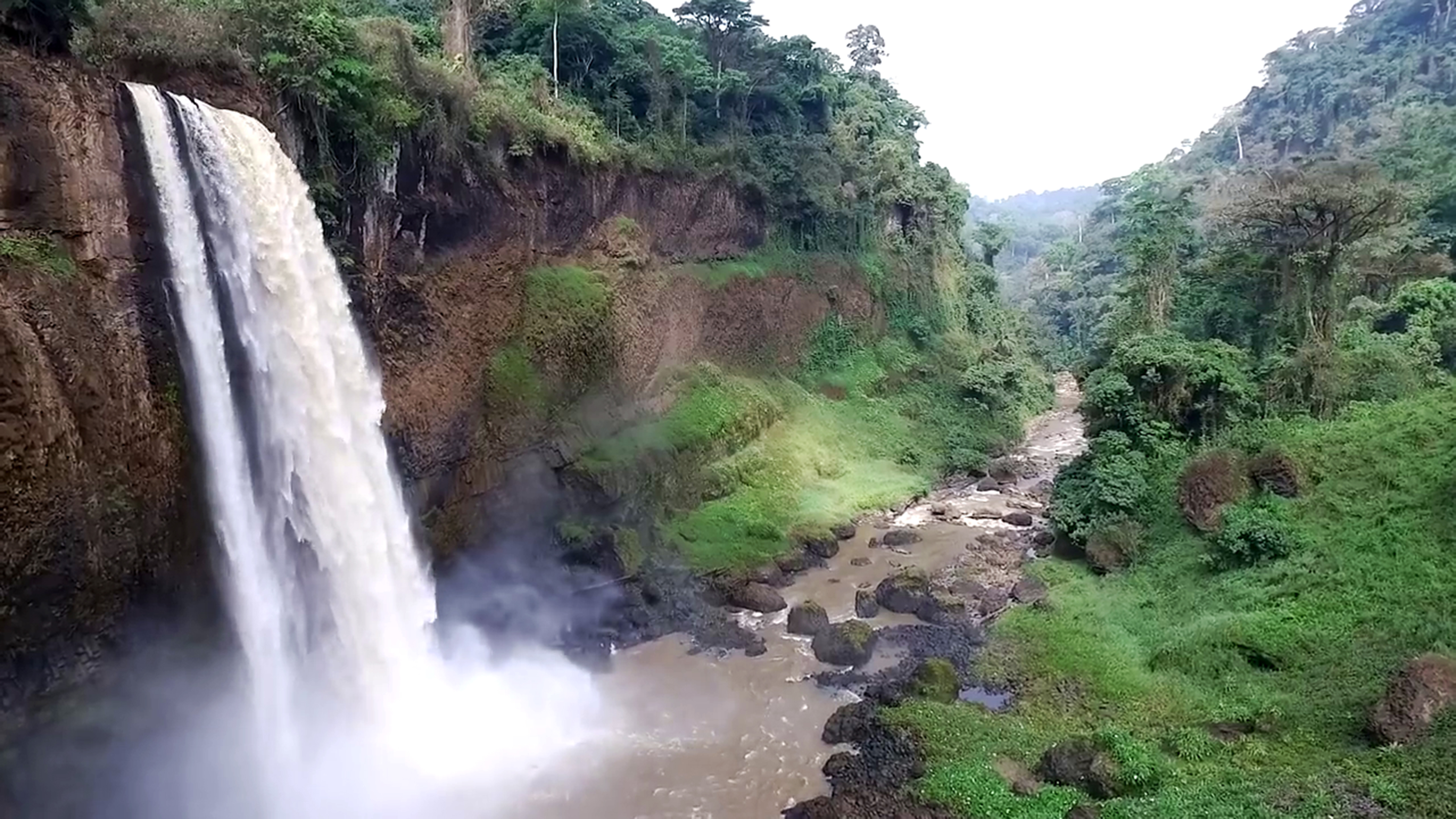
Chutes d'Ekom

The Nkam River rises in the Western High Plateau in the West Region of Cameroon, and joins the Makombé River to become the Wouri River. It is known to tourists for the spectacular Chutes d'Ekom, an 80-metre-high (260 ft) waterfall about 30 kilometres (19 mi) from Bafang. To the south of the town of Dschang, the Santchou Faunal Reserve lies to the east of the river.

== Fish farming ==
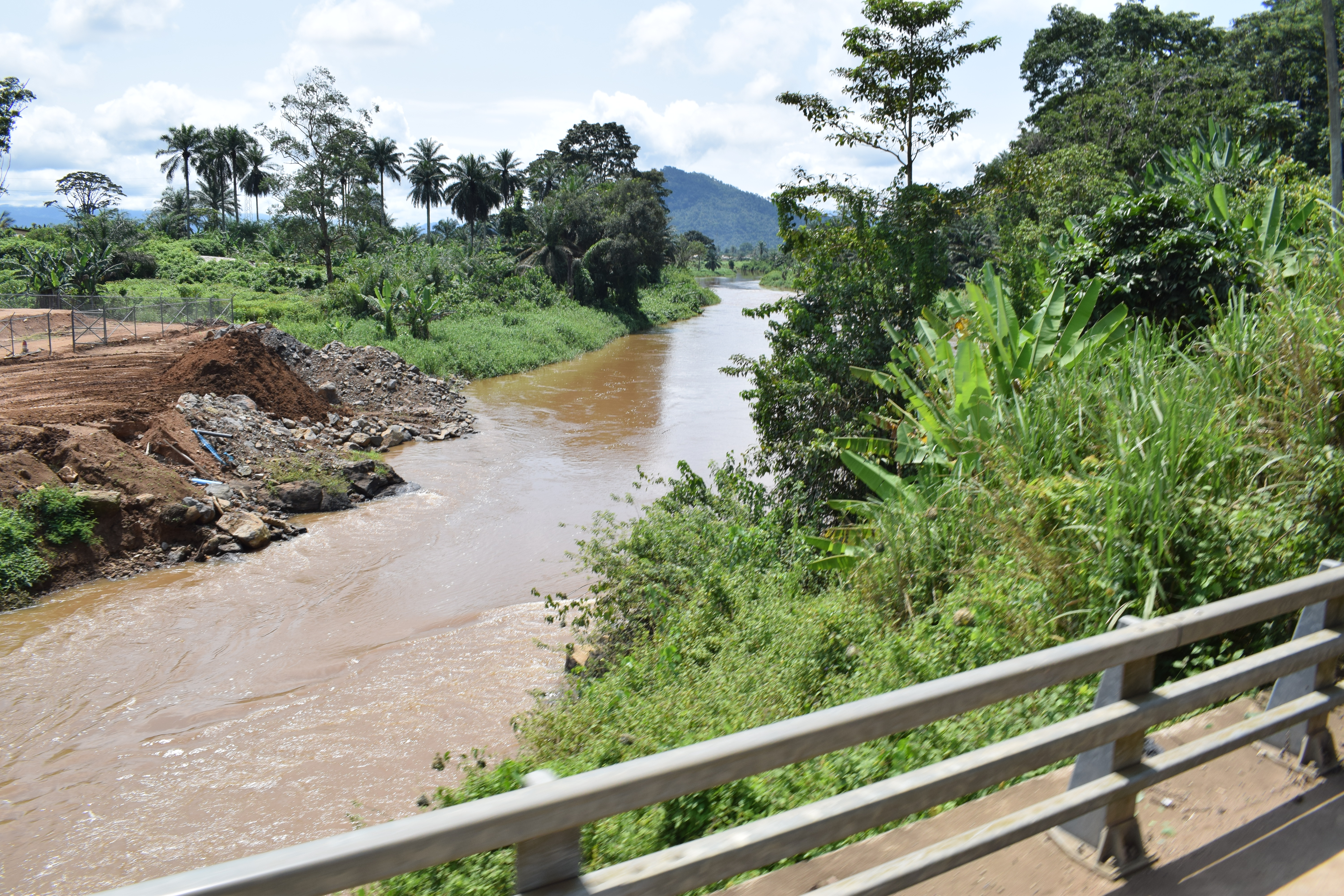
Nkam River

Annual flooding in the river valley provides millions of catfish juveniles. These are caught for immediate consumption, or to restock ponds used for aquaculture. The fish ponds are prepared at the end of the dry season, with bottom mud removed and the fish shelters repaired. The ponds are invaded by weedy grasses and shrubs during the early part of the rainy season, from April until July. Normally, the Nkam river floods from July to October, when fish migrate to the ponds. Between January and March the water retreats, the ponds are drained and the fish harvested.
