= Kilum-Ijim Forest =

Area of mountain rainforest in Cameroon

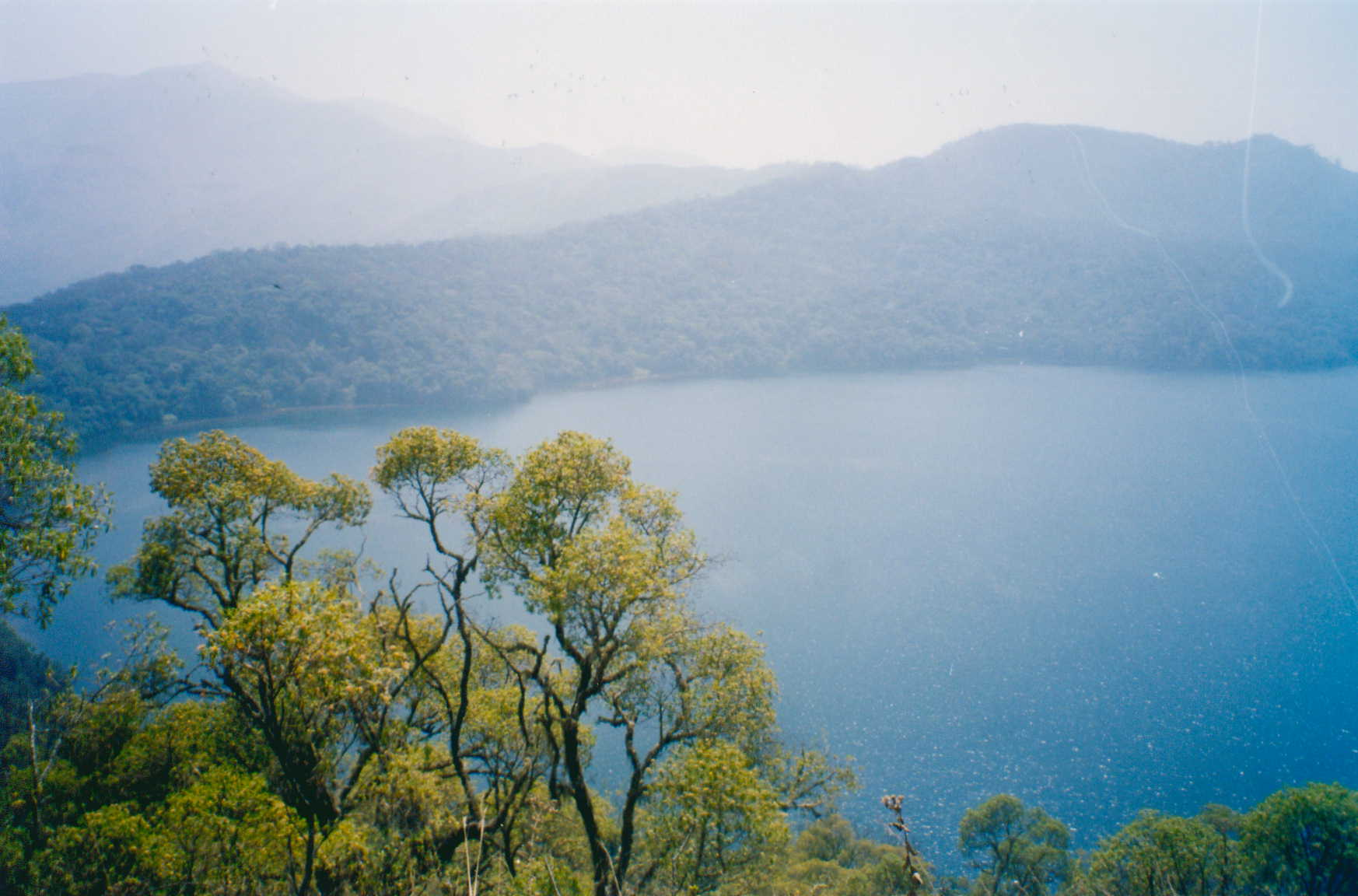
Lake Oku, in the Kilum-Ijim Forest

The Kilum-Ijim Forest is an area of mountain rainforest in Cameroon's North-West Region. It is found on Mount Oku and the nearby Ijim Ridge in the Cameroon mountains, with Lake Oku lying in a crater in its center. It is the largest area of Afromontane forest left in West Africa. The area is an important one for biodiversity, including the endemic Bannerman's turaco and banded wattle-eye. The forest is the focus of a successful community conservation project, the Kilum-Ijim Forest Project, which works to protect the forest. The project is a collaboration between the Cameroon Ministry of the Environment and BirdLife International, and focuses on sustainable use of the forests, local management, working to benefit both the biodiversity and local development. The programme works so well that the boundaries of the forest, as mapped by satellite imagery, are expanding, and the success of the idea has led to another sister project in Cameroon, the Bamenda Highlands Forest Project.

The Kilum-Ijim Forest is an area of massive land which has extreme biodiversity, ranging from tropical rainforest to lake Biomes. To keep the rainforest sustainable and available for future use, control of areas of the Kilum Forest have been handed over to the locals to preserve and sustain.
