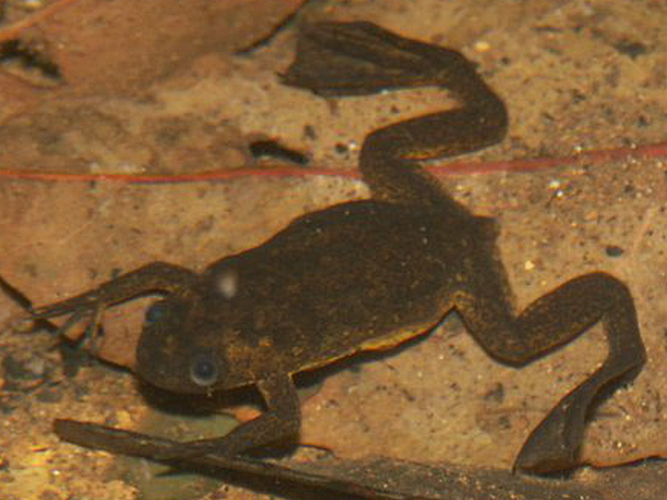

Conservation status
- Critically Endangered (IUCN 3.1)

Scientific classification
- Kingdom: Animalia
- Phylum: Chordata
- Class: Amphibia
- Order: Anura
- Family: Pipidae
- Genus: Xenopus
- Species: X. longipes

Binomial name
- Xenopus longipes Loumont & Kobel, 1991

= Lake Oku clawed frog =

Species of amphibian

The Lake Oku clawed frog (Xenopus longipes) is a species of frog in the family Pipidae, endemic to Lake Oku, a small crater lake in northwest Cameroon. It is a small, dark-coloured, fully aquatic frog with a length of 28 to 36 mm (1.1 to 1.4 in), males being slightly smaller than females. The International Union for Conservation of Nature has rated this frog as "critically endangered" on the basis of its small area of occurrence at a single location, and the possibility that introduction of non-native fish into the lake could cause the frog to be wiped out.

== Description ==
Lake Oku clawed frogs are small, with males growing to an average of 28–31 mm and females 32–36 mm. The name results from the claws at the ends of its two hind feet. Its back is brown, the belly is speckled black on an orange background. These frogs also have an unusually high number of chromosomes, 12 sets. It is fully aquatic, never observed to come out of the water.

== Distribution ==
The Lake Oku clawed frog lives exclusively in Lake Oku, a small crater lake in northwest Cameroon.

== Conservation ==
The Lake Oku clawed frog was assessed to be critically endangered during the IUCN's 2004 Global Amphibian Assessment, and again in 2017. This is because of its small range-size (one single crater lake) and the likelihood that fish could be introduced to the lake.

The lake in which it lives and the surrounding forest are an official government protected area (a "Plantlife Sanctuary"). This and the wider Kilum-Ijim forest (about 20,000 ha) have been subjected to a community forest conservation project facilitated by BirdLife International, the core work concluding in the early 2000s, but with minor projects continuing. The population of X. longipes has been studied by researchers in collaboration with the local community since 2006, including studying the lake's ecology. In 2013, a workshop with the local Oku community (including the Fon of Oku) drafted a conservation action plan to conserve Lake Oku, its surrounding forest and biodiversity such as X. longipes.

Captive populations have been established at several zoos, including ZSL-London Zoo (UK) (since 2008) and the Steinhart Aquarium of the California Academy of Sciences in San Francisco (USA) (since 2013). The general aim has been to research how to set up a captive assurance colony in event of extinction in the wild. In 2014, breeding was successfully achieved at ZSL-London Zoo.
