= Ngaoundere Plateau =

Coordinates: 7°20′00″N 13°50′00″E

Ngaoundéré Plateau showing faults of CASZ

Major geographical features near the Cameroon line: Ngaoundéré to the east.

The Ngaoundéré Plateau is a highland area in the Adamawa Region of Cameroon. It contains Tchabal Nganha, a large volcano, and many other recent volcanic structures.

== Location ==
The plateau is between the forested south and savannah north of Cameroon. Ngaoundéré, the capital of the Adamawa region, is located on the plateau. It lies over the Ngaoundere fault zone, which was reactivated in the Cretaceous. The Ngaoundere fault belongs the Central African Fault Zone. In this region the asthenosphere upwells from a depth of about 190 km to about 120 km in a relatively narrow belt.

== Formation ==
The plateau was formed by flows of basaltic lavas that filled two broad valleys eroded into the Precambrian basement, followed by further flows that built up the plateau. There are many trachyte and phonolite plugs across the plateau, and lines of cinder cones from the most recent eruptions. The plateau contains Tchabal Nganha, a large stratovolcano of basanitic to trachytic composition. Nganha is about 1,000 m high. It developed in four main events: eruption of numerous basaltic flows which form the bulk of the mountain; deposit of voluminous breccias, most of which were deeply eroded; eruption of trachytes and phonolites as thick flows; and finally basaltic activity in the summit area. Rocks date from 9.8 to 7 million years ago.

== Related volcanic zones ==
Although considered by many geologists to be part of the Cameroon Volcanic Line, the silicic volcanism of the Ngaoundere plateau is younger (11-9 million years old) than silicic volcanism in the Western Highlands, with much more alkaline basalts than in the western part of the line. This has been cited as evidence that the line is not caused by movement of the plate over a hotspot. To the east of Ngaoundere and Wakwa there is Quaternary volcanic activity consisting of scoria cones and lava flows, maars, and tuff cones. One lava flow in this area has been dated to 0.9 million years ago. Some of the volcanoes may be from the Holocene period.
