= Lake Oku =

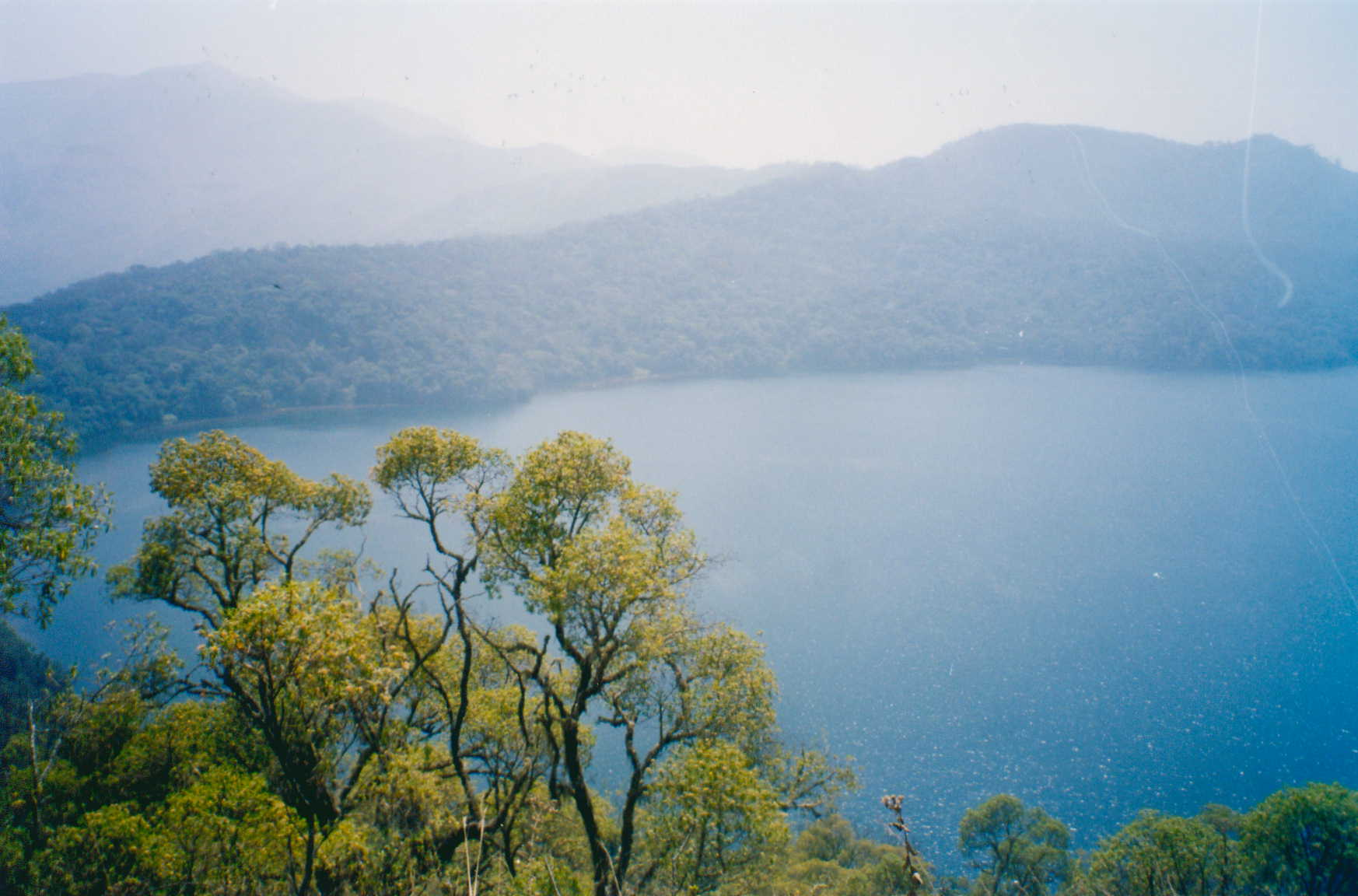

- Location within Cameroon Location within Africa
- Coordinates: 6°11′34″N 10°27′14″E
- Type: Crater lake
- Basin countries: Cameroon
- Surface area: 243 hectares (600 acres)
- Average depth: 32 metres (105 ft)
- Max. depth: 52 metres (171 ft)
- Surface elevation: 2,227 metres (7,306 ft)

Lake Oku is a crater lake on the Bamenda Plateau in the Northwest Region of Cameroon. It is located at 2,227 metres (7,306 ft) on Mount Oku, and is completely surrounded by cloud forest.

The lake lies in an explosion crater formed in the last phase of development of the Oku Massif, a large volcanic field with a diameter of about 100 kilometres (62 mi). Mount Oku is a stratovolcano that rises to 3,011 metres (9,879 ft). The lake is the subject of many myths among the local people.

The lake is the only known habitat of the Lake Oku Clawed Frog. The surrounding Kilum-Ijim Forest is a nature reserve, set up by BirdLife International, and home to many rare species.

== See also ==
- Lake Barombi Koto
- Lake Barombi Mbo
- Lake Bermin
- Lake Dissoni
- Lake Ejagham
