= Astropanax abyssinicus =

Scientific classification
- Kingdom: Plantae
- Clade: Tracheophytes
- Clade: Angiosperms
- Clade: Eudicots
- Clade: Asterids
- Order: Apiales
- Family: Araliaceae
- Genus: Astropanax
- Species: A. abyssinicus

Binomial name
- Astropanax abyssinicus (Hochst. ex A.Rich.) Seem. (1865)

Synonyms
- Synonymy: Aralia abyssinica Hochst. ex A.Rich. (1848); Astropanax elatus (K.Koch ex Hook.f.) Seem. in J. Bot. 3: 177 (1865); Heptapleurum abyssinicum (Hochst. ex A.Rich.) Benth. & Hook.f. ex Vatke (1876); Heptapleurum elatum (K.Koch ex Hook.f.) Hiern (1877); Paratropia elata K.Koch ex Hook.f. (1864); Schefflera abyssinica (Hochst. ex A.Rich.) Harms (1894); Schefflera acutifoliolata De Wild. (1920); Schefflera hookeriana Harms; Sciodaphyllum abyssinicum (Hochst. ex A.Rich.) Miq. (1863)

Species of flowering plant

Astropanax abyssinicus is a flowering plant in the family Araliaceae. It grows in tropical Africa, from southeastern Nigeria to Ethiopia and Zambia.

Schefflera abyssinica is a tree with a broad crown, which grows up to 12 metres tall as a freestanding tree. It often grows as an epiphyte on other trees, and can send roots down to the ground and out-compete the host tree. Epiphytic trees can be as tall as 30 metres. The tree bole is often twisted, even on freestanding trees.

It grows in montane rainforest, where it is frequently found in secondary growth, gallery forests, and where forests transition to grassland. It typically grows between 1,400 and 2,800 metres elevation, and occasionally as low as 1,200 metres.

The plant is sometimes harvested from the wild and used for timber, firewood, or medicine. It is sometimes grown as a living fence or an ornamental plant in gardens.
