= Oku Volcanic Field =

Volcanic field in Cameroon

Coordinates: 6°20′0″N 10°40′0″E

Major geological features near Cameroon line

The Oku Volcanic Field or Oku Massif is a group of volcanoes based on a swell in the Cameroon Volcanic Line, located in the Oku region of the Western High Plateau of Cameroon. The Mount Oku stratovolcano rises to 3,011 m above sea level.

The massif has a diameter of almost 100 km and contains four major stratovolcanoes: Mount Oku, Mount Babanki 15 km SW of Oku, Nyos and Nkambe. Rocks in the massif have ages from 24.9 to 22.1 million years ago, but more recent activity has occurred. The massif is composed of rhyolitic and trachytic rock, and contains many maars and basaltic cinder cones.

The Oku Volcanic Field includes two crater lakes, Lake Nyos to the north and Lake Monoun to the south. On 15 August 1984, an earthquake and landslide triggered a major release of carbon dioxide from Lake Monoun, killing several people. Lake Nyos is inside a maar formed by an explosion about 400 years ago, and is about 1,800 m wide and 208 m deep. There is a low-temperature reservoir of free carbon dioxide below the lake bottom, which seeps into the lake through a volcanic pipe. On 21 August 1986, Lake Nyos released a massive amount of carbon dioxide which killed at least 1,700 people by suffocation, possibly triggered by a force 5 earthquake along the Foumban Shear Zone, which runs under the massif.

== See also ==
- List of volcanic fields
