= Bambouto Massif =

Coordinates: 5°40′00″N 10°03′00″E

Major geological features near Cameroon line

The Bambouto Massif or Bamboutos Mountains is a group of volcanoes based on a swell in the Cameroon Volcanic Line, located in the Western High Plateau of Cameroon, merging in the north with the Oku Volcanic Field.

== Geology ==
The large volcanic complex extends in a NE-SW direction for over 50 kilometres (31 mi), with the highest peaks rising to 2,679 metres (8,789 ft) around the rim of a caldera with a diameter of 10 kilometres (6.2 mi). Lava dating gives ages from 23 to 6 million years ago, with a lower basaltic series and an upper series of trachytes, trachyphonolites and phonolites.

== Environment ==
The upper part of the massif above 2,000 metres (6,600 ft) has a cool and cloudy climate with 2,510 millimetres (99 in) of rainfall annually. Soils are acidic, low in phosphates, and relatively infertile. Due to population pressure, farming is carried out on the steep slopes, leading to erosion and further loss of fertility. Cattle are also grazed on the upper slopes where food crop cultivation is uneconomical.
