= Mount Oku =

Volcano in Cameroon

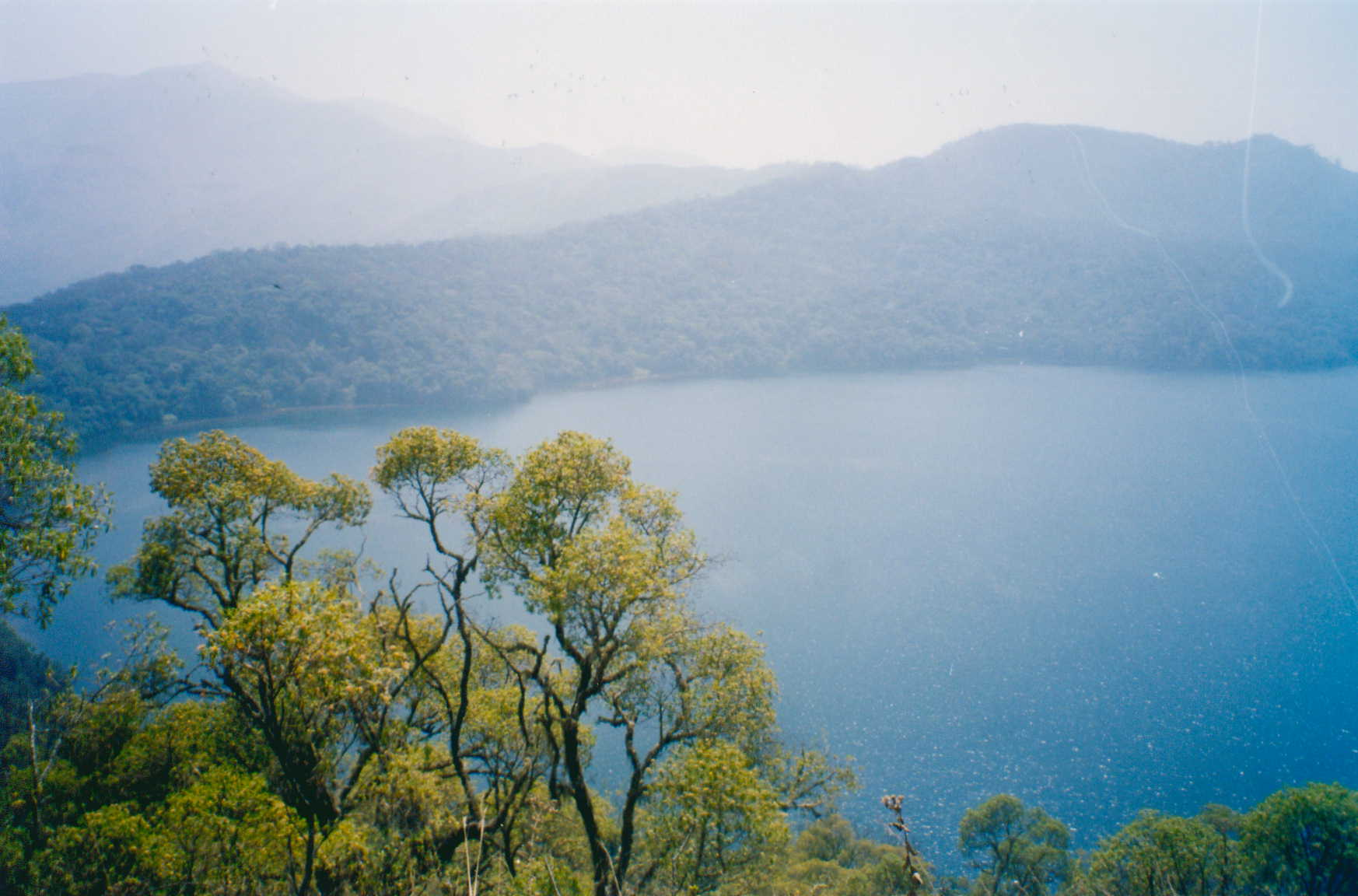
- Lake Oku near Mount Oku

Highest point
- Elevation: 3,011 m (9,879 ft)
- Prominence: 2,491 m (8,173 ft)
- Listing: Ultra, Ribu
- Coordinates: 06°11′59″N 10°31′08″E

Geography
- Location within Cameroon
- Location: Northwest Region, Cameroon

Geology
- Rock age: 25 million years
- Mountain type: Stratovolcano
- Volcanic zone: Cameroon Volcanic Line
- Volcanic field: Oku Volcanic Field

Mount Oku, or Kilum Mountain, is the largest volcano in the Oku Massif, in the Cameroon Volcanic Line, located in the Oku region of the Western High Plateau of Cameroon. It is the second highest mountain in mainland Central Africa. The stratovolcano rises to 3,011 metres (9,879 ft) above sea level, and is cut by a large caldera.

== Geology ==
Some of the rocks have ages starting from 24.9 to 22.1 million years ago, but much more recent activity has occurred. The mountain is built of basaltic and hawaiitic lavas, succeeded by trachytes, and then by large volumes of trachytic and rhyolitic ignimbrites with a thickness of up to 1,000 m. Further trachytic lavas, tuffs and breccias were produced, and the most recent phase produced pyroclastic cones and explosion craters. One of these craters holds Lake Oku, from which flows of basalt issued in the north, and of rhyolitic and phonolitic lavas in the south.

== Ecology ==
A small sphagnum community with associated wetland plant species was discovered at 2,900 m in 1997, near the summit of the volcano, the highest sphagnum bog in West Africa. This site includes several plant species endemic to the Kilum-Ijim area, and is of extremely high conservation importance. The 200 km^{2} of forests of the Kilum-Ijim area around the mountain form the largest remaining patch of montane forest in West Africa, an important habitat for endemic species of animals and plants. The forest is at risk, since it is surrounded by a high density of human settlements. BirdLife International and the Ministry of the Environment and Forestry are jointly operating the Kilum-Ijim Forest Project, which aims to conserve the forest biome, maintain biodiversity and ensure sustainable reuse.

Most of the area within the Kilum-Ijim boundary is above 2000 metres in height, and consists of montane forest mixed with montane grassland and subalpine communities. At lower elevations, most of the submontane forest has been cleared for agriculture. Based on satellite images, between 1958 and 1988 about half of the forest was lost, although regeneration began soon after the conservation project was started in 1987. Since then there has been steady recovery of the forest reserve, which is under the direct management of the Kilum-Ijim communities. Endangered endemic species found exclusively on Mount Oku include the Mount Oku hylomyscus, the Dieterlen's brush-furred mouse, the Lake Oku clawed frog, Crotaphatrema lamottei the Mount Oku caecilian and the toad Wolterstorffina chirioi. The montane grassland above the forest belt is home to the endemic Mittendorf's striped grass mouse.

== See also ==
- List of Ultras of Africa
- Lake Nyos
- Lake Monoun
