= Western High Plateau =

Mountainous area in Cameroon

Coordinates: 6°30′N 10°30′E

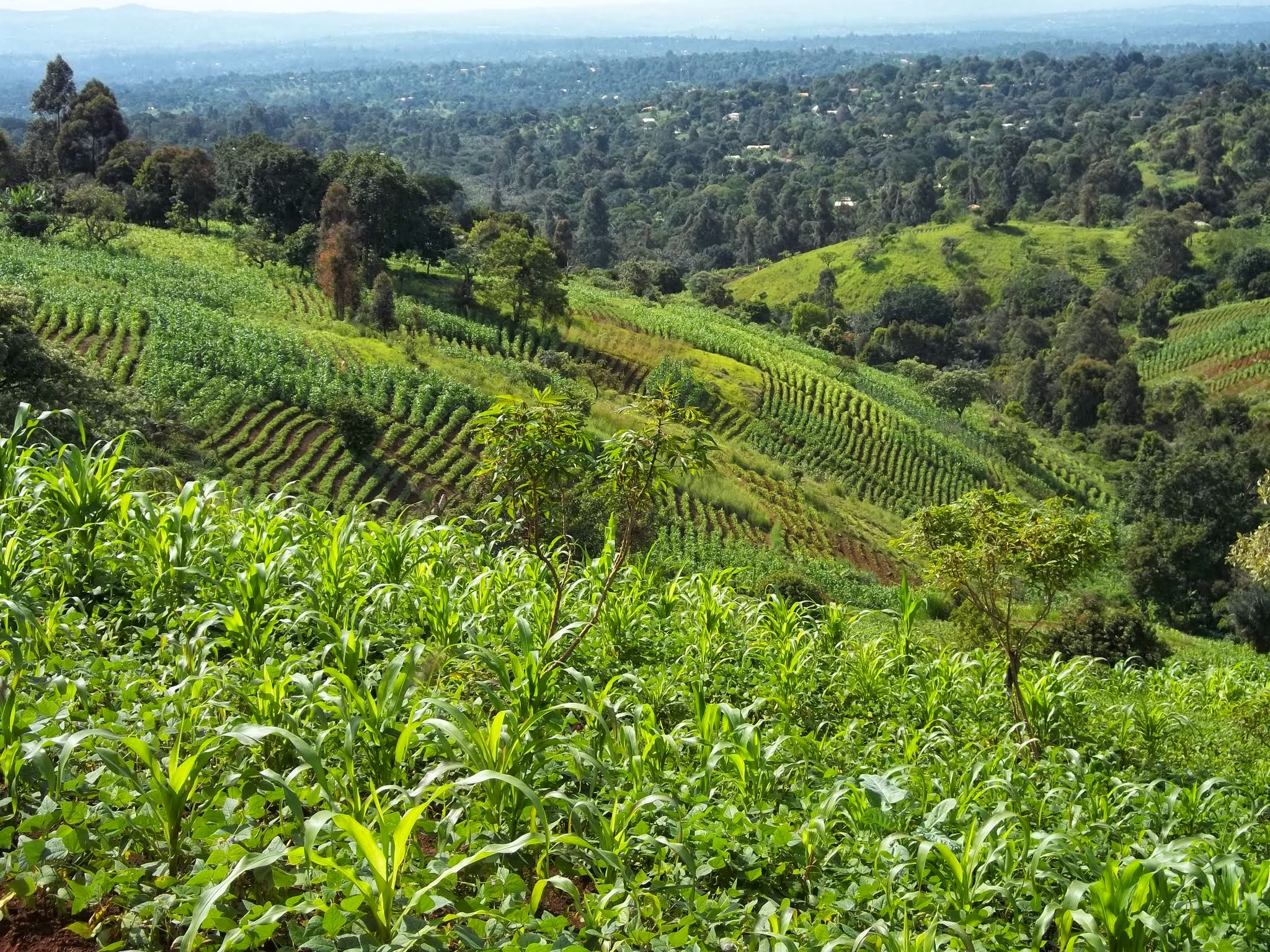
Bamileke grassland

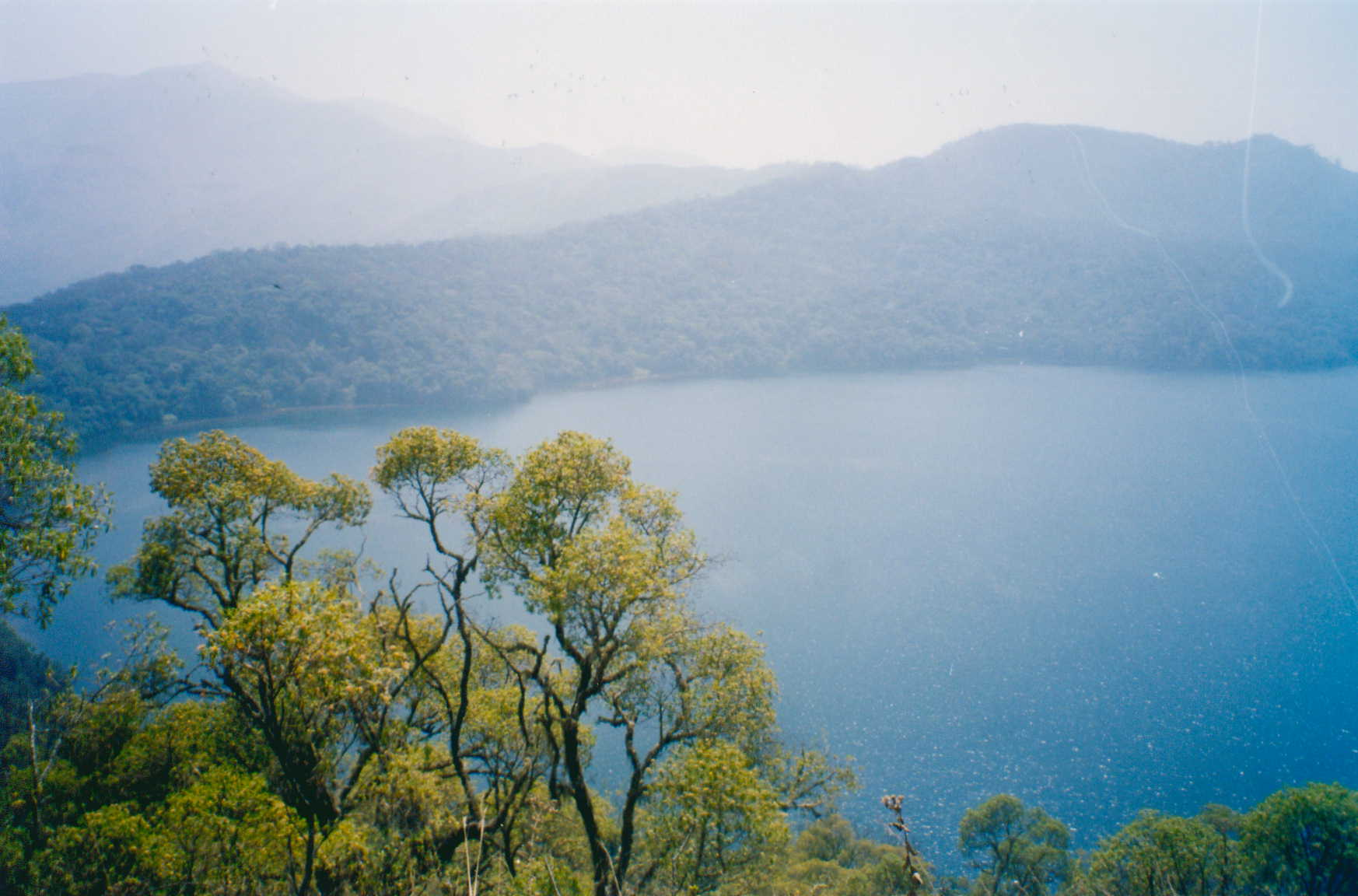
Lake Oku is a crater lake on the plateau.

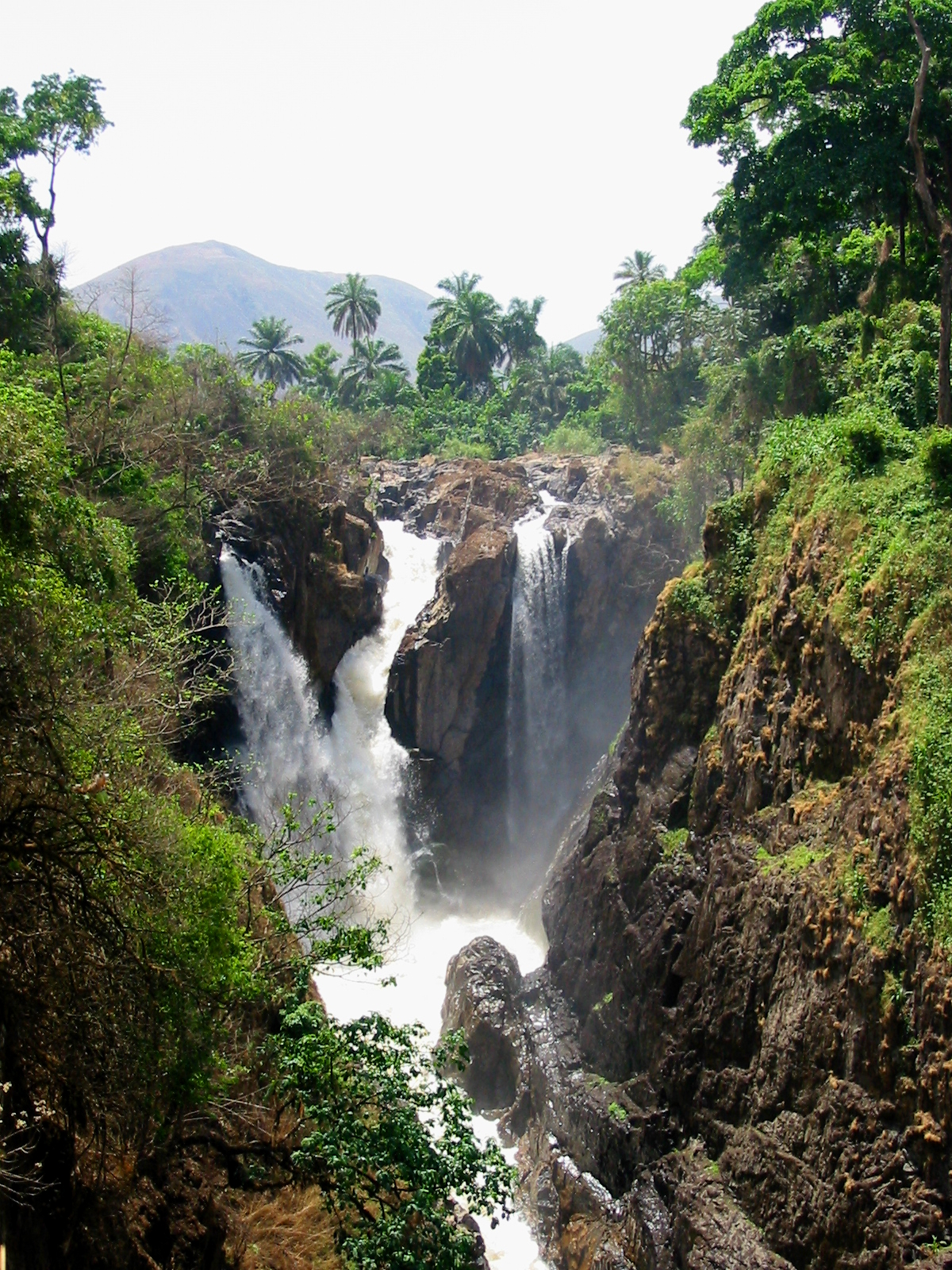
Menchum Falls is a tributary of the Benue River.

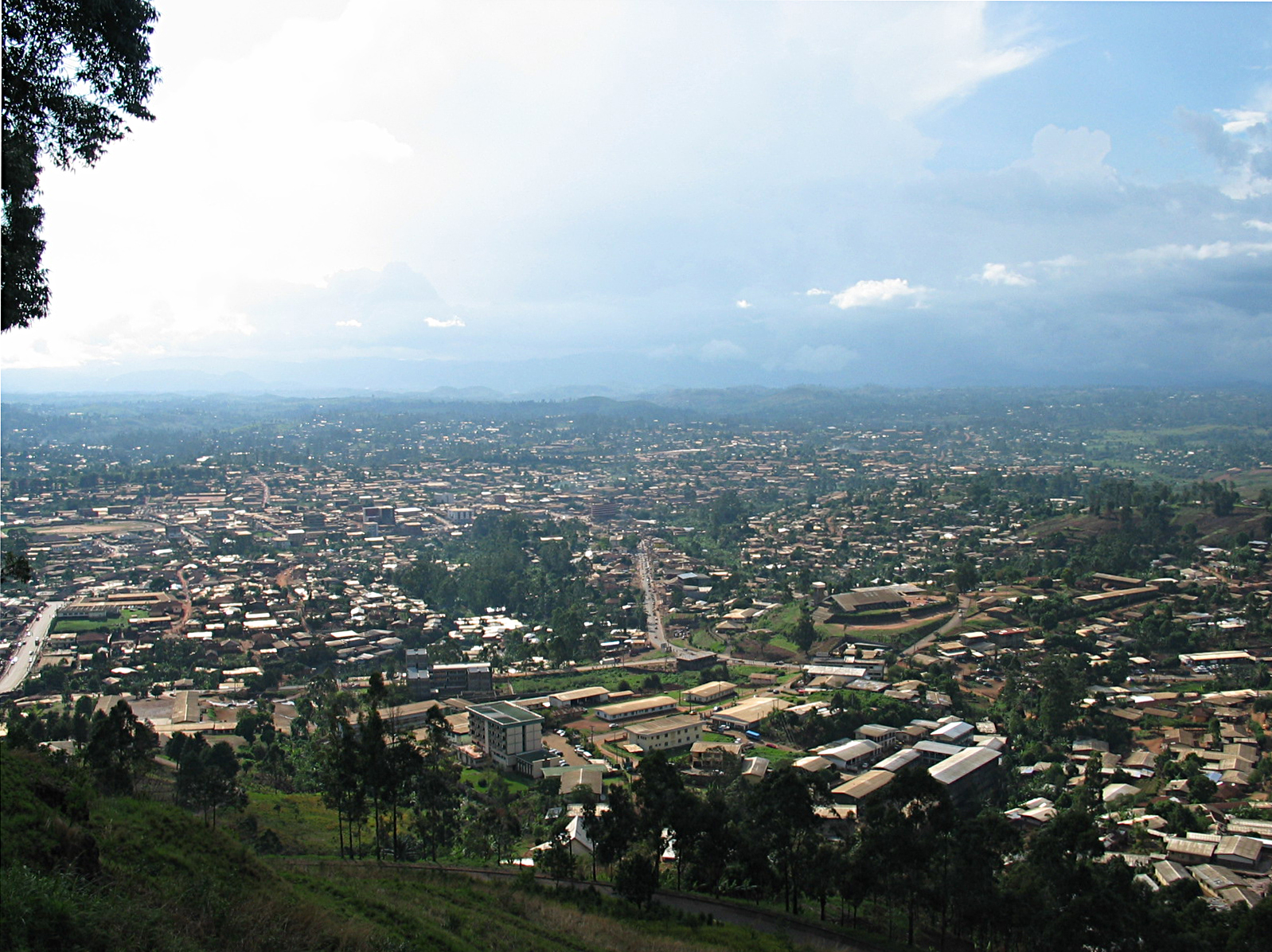
Bamenda from the mountain road into town.

The Western High Plateau, Western Highlands or Bamenda Grassfields is a region of Cameroon characterised by high relief, cool temperatures, heavy rainfall and savanna vegetation. The region lies along the Cameroon line and consists of mountain ranges and volcanoes made of crystalline and igneous rock. The region borders the South Cameroon Plateau to the southeast, the Adamawa Plateau to the northeast and the Cameroon coastal plain to the south.

== Topography and geology ==
The Western High Plateau lies along the Cameroon line, a series of volcanic swells running from the Atlantic Ocean in the southwestern part of the plateau to the Adamawa Plateau in the northeast. The region is characterised by accidented relief of massifs and mountains. The Western High Plateau features several dormant volcanoes, including the Bamboutos Mountains, Mount Oku and Mount Kupe. The plateau rises in steps from the west. To the east, it terminates in mountains that range from 1,000 metres to 2,500 metres in height, terminating in the South Cameroon Plateau. The plateau gives way to the Adamawa Plateau to the northeast, which is a larger but less accidented region.

The core of the plateau is made up of volcanic rock, which is ringed by plutonic rock. The base is crystalline and metamorphic rock. The base rock is primarily gneiss and granite that dates to the Precambrian period. A layer of basalt covers this. Vulcanism has created fertile black and brown soils. Erosion played a large role.

== Climate and drainage ==
The plateau experiences an equatorial climate of the Cameroon type. The area experiences two major seasons: A long, wet season of nine months, and a short, dry season of three months. During the wet season, humid, prevailing monsoon winds blow in from the west and lose their moisture upon hitting the region's mountains. Average rainfall per year ranges from 1,000 mm to 2,000 mm. High elevations give the region a cooler climate than the rest of Cameroon. For example, the average temperature at Dschang in the West Region is 20°C. Toward the north, rainfall levels are reduced as the Sudan climate becomes predominant.

The Western High Plateau's relief and high rainfall make it a major watershed for Cameroon. Important rivers in the region include the Manyu, which rises in the Bamboutos Mountains and becomes the Cross River on its lower course, and the Nkam, which is known as the Wouri River on its lower course. The region gives rise to important tributaries to the Sanaga River. These rivers follow a Cameroon regime, a subtype of the equatorial regime of other southern Cameroonian rivers. This means that the rivers experience a long, high-water period during the wet season and a short, low-water period during the dry season. The region's rivers ultimately empty into the Atlantic Ocean. The area's accidented geography gives rise to several waterfalls along these waterways. Ekon Falls near Nkongsamba in the West Region is 80 metres high. Crater lakes dot the plateau, the result of dead volcanoes filling with water.

== Flora ==
The Western High Plateau was once heavily forested. However, repeated cutting and burning by human beings has forced the forest back to areas along the waterways and has allowed grasslands to expand into the area. Sudan savanna forms the dominant vegetation. This consists of grassfields—leading to the name Bamenda grassfields around the city of Bamenda—and short shrubs and trees that shed their foliage during the dry season as a defence against brush fires and dry weather. Raffia palms grow in the valleys and depressions.
