= List of fossiliferous stratigraphic units in Ethiopia =

Fossiliferous stratigraphic units in Ethiopia
Bouri Formation
Gadeb Plain Group
Enticho Sandstone
Omo Group
Fejej Formation
Awash Group
Amba Aradam Formation
Mugher Mudstone
Antalo Limestone
Adigrat Sandstone
Chilga formation
Konso Formation
Mush Valley

This is a list of fossiliferous stratigraphic units in Ethiopia.

== List of fossiliferous stratigraphic units ==
Group	Formation	Period	Notes
	Bouri Formation	Middle Pleistocene	
	Konso Formation	Gelasian - Calabrian	
Gadeb Plain Group	Mio Goro Formation	Gelasian-Calabrian	
Gadeb Plain Group	Gadeb Formation	Piacenzian-Gelasian	
Awash Group	Wehaietu Formation	Pliocene-Holocene	
Awash Group	Meadura Formation	Quaternary	
Awash Group	Matabaietu Formation	Zanclean-Pleistocene	
Awash Group	Hadar Formation	Zanclean-Gelasian	
Awash Group	Sagantole Formation	Miocene-Pleistocene	
Awash Group	Chorora Formation	Serravallian-Tortonian	
Awash Group	Adu Asa Formation	Late Miocene	
Omo Group	Omo Kibish Formation	Late Pleistocene	
Omo Group	Kalam Formation	Early Pleistocene	
Omo Group	Shungura Formation	Pliocene-Gelasian	
Omo Group	Mursi Formation	Zanclean	
Omo Group	Usno Formation	Pliocene	
Fejej Basalts	Fejej Formation	Zanclean-Pleistocene	
	Mush Valley Formation	Early Miocene	
	Chilga Formation	Chattian	
	Amba Aradam Formation	Early Aptian	
	Agula Shale	Tithonian	
	Mugher Mudstone	Tithonian	
	Antalo Limestone	Callovian-Kimmeridgian	
	Adigrat Sandstone	Late Triassic-Oxfordian	
	Enticho Sandstone	Late Ordovician	

== See also ==
- Lists of fossiliferous stratigraphic units in Africa
  - List of fossiliferous stratigraphic units in Djibouti
  - List of fossiliferous stratigraphic units in Eritrea
  - List of fossiliferous stratigraphic units in Kenya
  - List of fossiliferous stratigraphic units in Sudan
- Geology of Ethiopia
