= Antalo Limestone =

Geological formation in Ethiopia

- Stratigraphic range: Oxfordian-Kimmeridgian; ~163–153 Ma
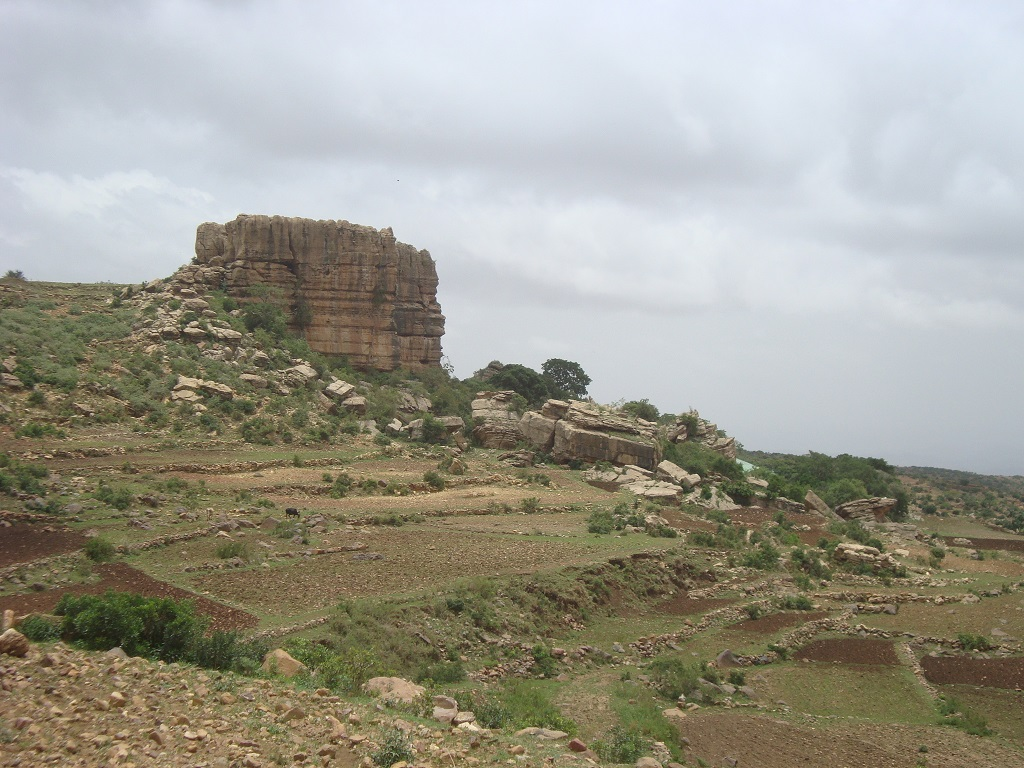
- Formation at Kurkura village (Dogua Tembien), holding St. Mika'el's cave
- Type: Geological formation
- Underlies: Mugher Mudstone
- Overlies: Adigrat Sandstone
- Thickness: 800 m (2,600 ft)

Lithology
- Primary: Limestone, marl, calcareous sandstone
- Other: Grainstone, wackestone

Location
- Coordinates: 13.5977°N 39.2772°E
- Approximate paleocoordinates: 7.5°S 26.6°E
- Region: Tigray
- Country: Ethiopia, Eritrea
- Extent: Mekelle Outlier, Danakil Alps

Type section
- Named for: Antalo town
- Named by: William Thomas Blanford
- Year defined: 1868
- Antalo Limestone (Ethiopia)

The Antalo Limestone, also known as the Antalo Sequence, is a geological formation in Ethiopia. It is between 300 and 800 metres thick and comprises fossiliferous limestones and marls that were deposited in a reef. Marine microfossils have shown an age between 165 and 150 million years.

== Name and definition ==
The Antalo Supersequence includes two main stratigraphic units: the Antalo Sequence and the Agula Group. The Antalo Sequence, or Antalo Limestone has been named after the town of Hintalo in Tigray, Ethiopia. The name of the formation was coined by geologist William Thomas Blanford, who accompanied the British Expedition to Abyssinia in 1868. At that time, Hintalo was a major town on the route of the invading British army. So far the nomenclature has not been proposed for recognition to the International Commission on Stratigraphy.

== Geographical extent ==
The sedimentary succession is found in Ethiopia, in the Mekelle Outlier, in the Blue Nile gorge, in the Harrar Plateau and around Dire Dawa.

== Stratigraphic context ==
The Antalo Limestone overlies the Adigrat Sandstone, and is covered by the Agula Group or Agula Shale and the Mugher Mudstone.

== Environment ==
The Antalo Limestone comprises sediment that was deposited in a shallow tropical sea in the upper Jurassic. As the region had undergone a marine transgression, it was below the sea level. At that time, what would become Ethiopia was positioned just south of the equator.

== Lithology ==
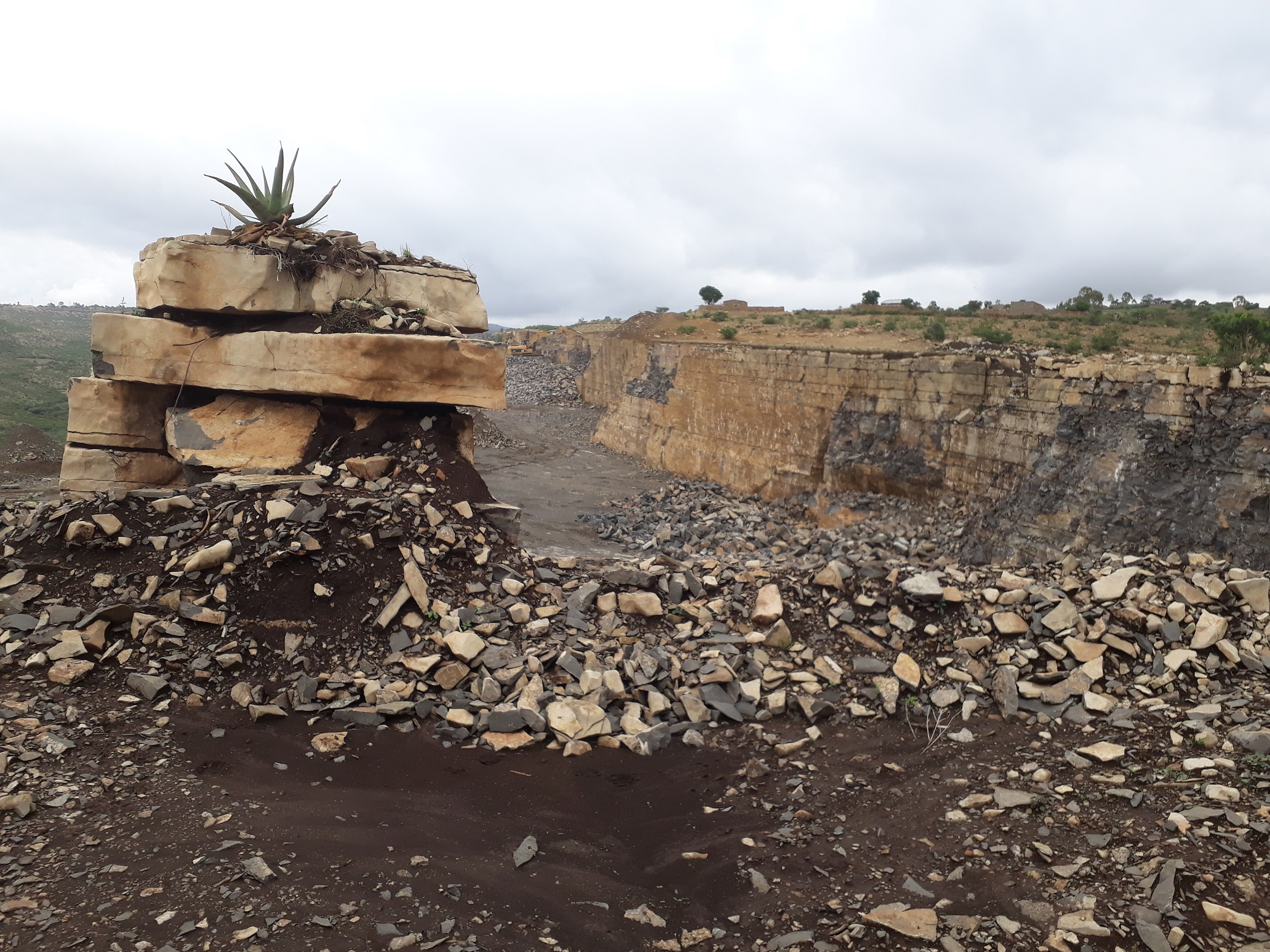
Quarry in the third member of Antalo Limestone at May Qarano in Dogu'a Tembien

The limestones and marls of the Antalo Sequence also hold shale and calcareous sandstone layers. The Antalo Limestone comprises four members: (1) a basal member with grainstone and wackestone lithologies, with marly interlayers and in the upper part stromatoporoid coral-like level; (2) sandy limestone deposited in estuaries and lagoons; (3) micritic (very fine grained) limestone with intercalations of wackestone and coquina beds deposited in relatively deep water; and (4) a succession of marls and limestone, with cherty limestone at the base.

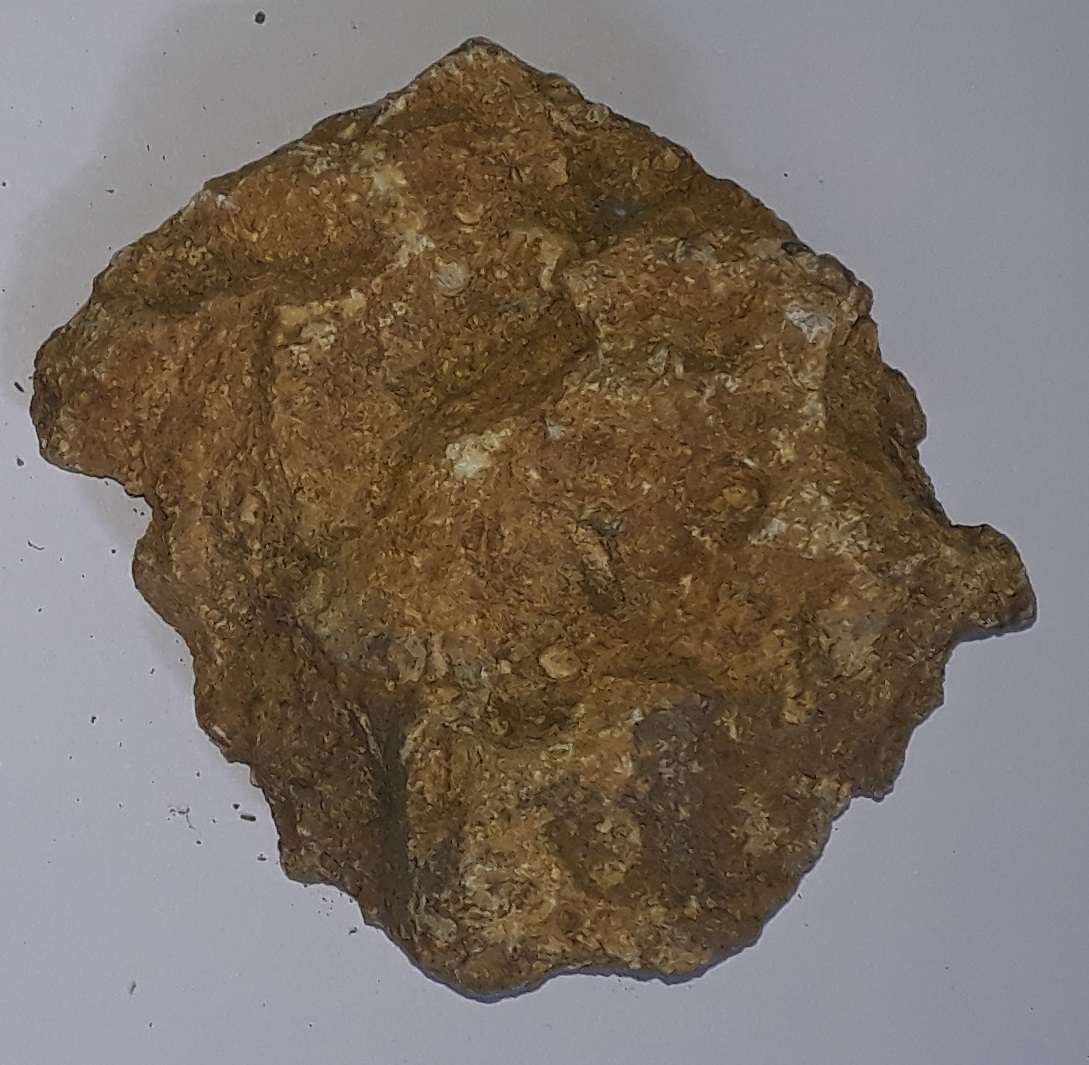
Rock sample of sandy limestone (second member), collected in Addi Idaga

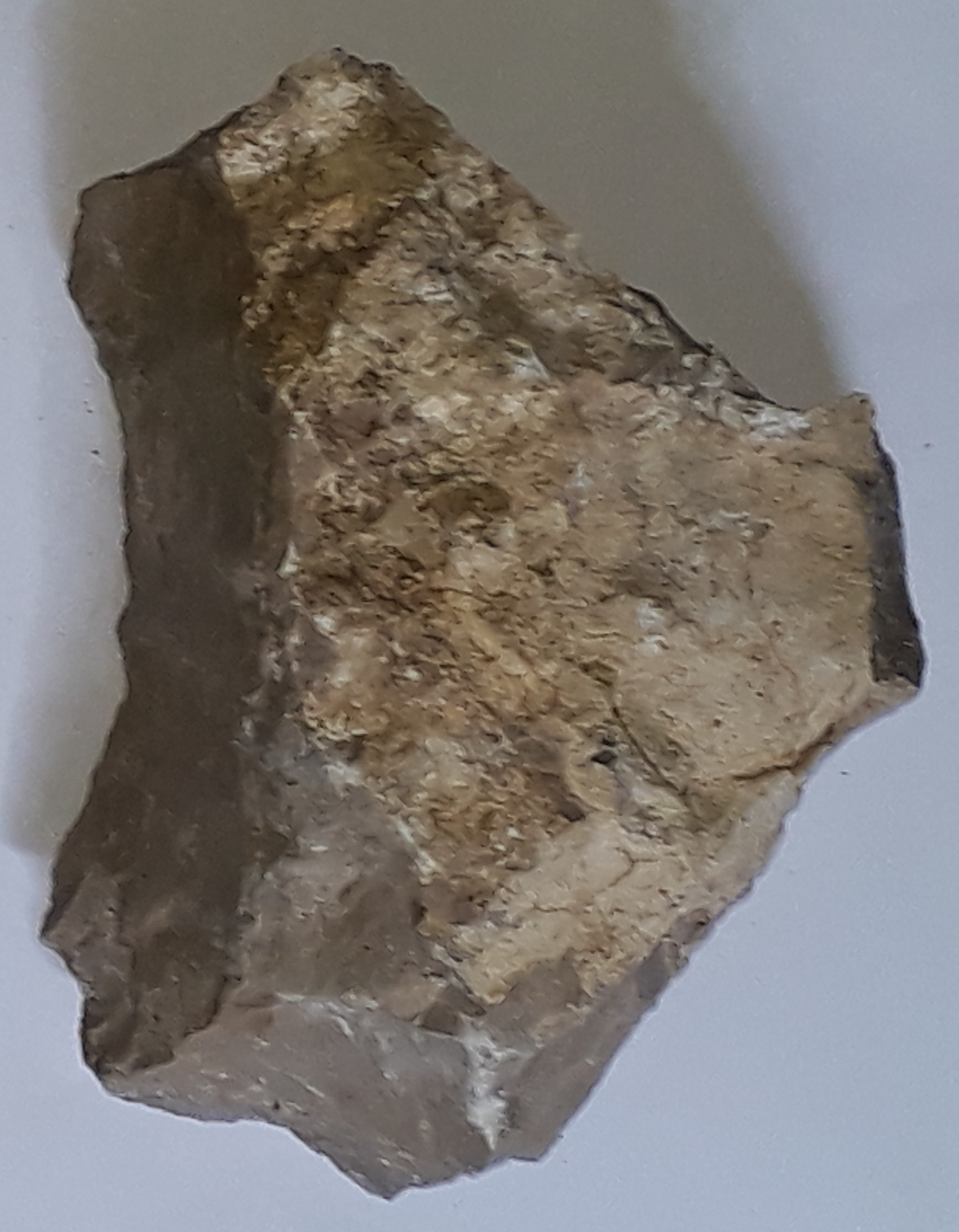
Rock sample from the fourth (upper) member, collected in Miheno

== Fossil content ==
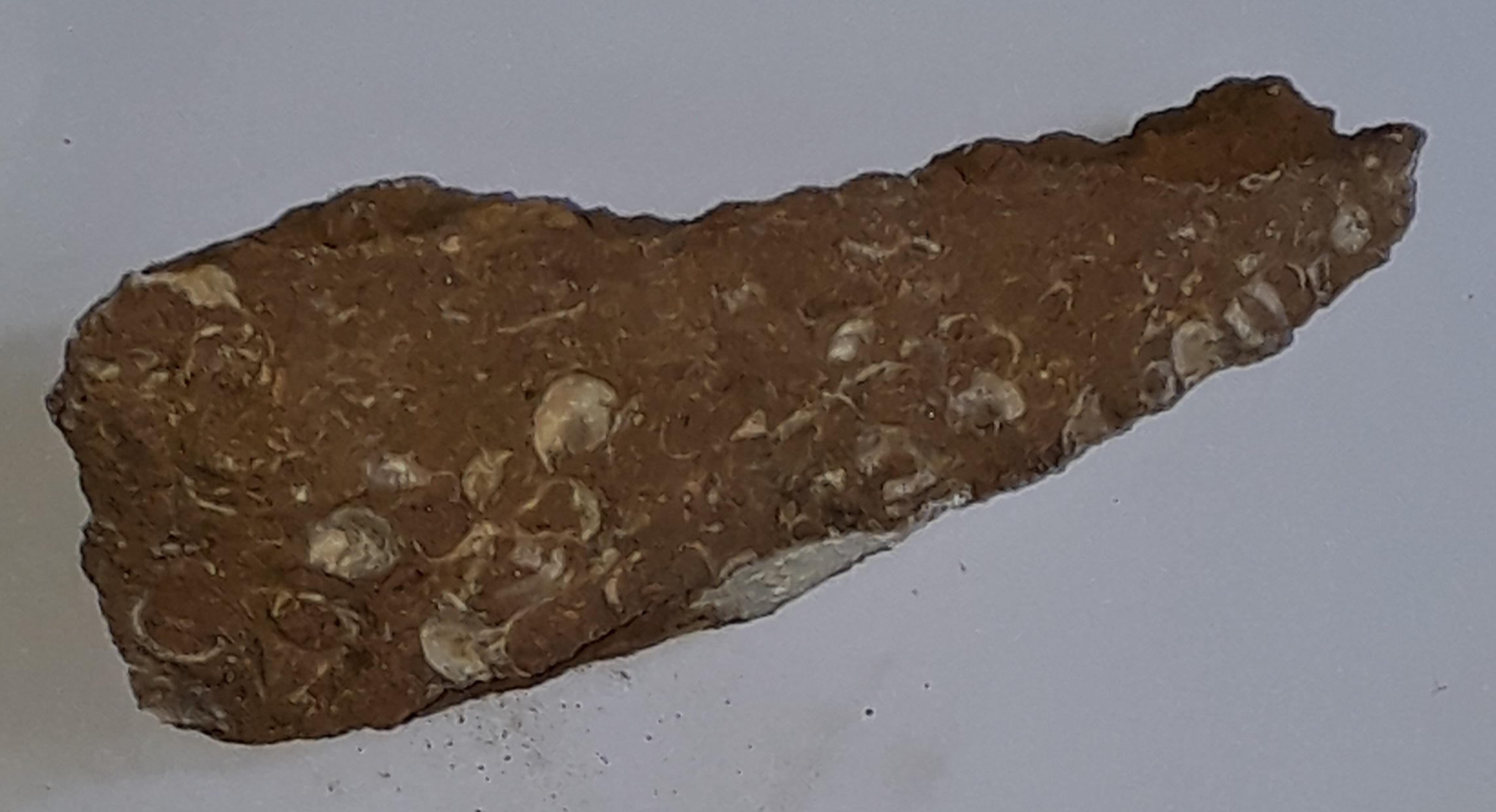
Rock sample of Antalo Limestone with mollusks, collected in Azef

The Antalo Limestone sediments were deposited at the time of dinosaurs and primitive birds. Well away from coasts, coral reefs formed the edge of the continental shelf. At shallow depth, the sea bottom was made of large mudflats, with sand bars and spits near river mouths. This sea bed hosted many invertebrate animals: echinoderms, crustaceans, bivalves and gastropods were common. There was also fish. As it was not a nutrient-rich ecosystem, larger predators were rare, maybe some marine reptiles like crocodiles. A striking scavenger in this fauna was a cephalopod mollusc, a giant nautilus with a characteristic spiral shell.

=== Invertebrates ===
Bivalves

Bivalves of the Antalo Limestone.
Genus	Species	Presence	Material	Notes	Images
Actinostreon	A. solitarium	10 specimens from AL1, 65 from AL2.	75 specimens.	A palaeolophid.	
Arcomytilus	A. laitmairensis	AL1 and AL2.	3 left valves, 1 right valve and 4 articulated specimens.	A mytilid.	
Eopecten	E. velatus	AL1.	1 left valve.	A pectinid.	
Gryphaea	G.? (Bilobissa?) balli	AL1.	1 left valve.	A gryphaeid.	
Integricardium	I. (Integricardium) cf. bannesianum	7 specimens from AL1, 1 from AL2.	4 left valves, 1 right valves and 3 double-valved specimens.	A cardiid.	
Liostrea	L. sp.	AL1 and AL2.	2 specimens.	An ostreid.	
"Lucina"	"L." cf. cecchii	AL2.	4 double-valved specimens.	A lucinid.	
Modiolus	M. (Modiolus) imbricatus	2 specimens from AL1, 1 from AL2.	3 double-valved specimens.	A mytilid.	
Musculus	M. (Musculus) somaliensis	AL1 and AL2.	2 articulated specimens.	A mytilid.	
Nanogyra	N. nana	AL2.	2 articulated specimens.	A gryphaeid.	
Pholadomya	P. (Bucardiomya) somaliensis	1 specimen from AL1, 6 from AL2.	7 double-valved specimens.	A pholadomyid.	
Pholadomya	P. (Bucardiomya) lirata	AL2.	1 double-valved specimen.	A pholadomyid.	
Plagiostoma	P. harronis	AL1 and AL2.	3 left valves, 5 right valves and 2 articulated specimens.	A limid.	
Plagiostoma	P. sublaeviusculum	AL2.	1 left valve 1 right valve and 1 articulated specimen.	A limid.	
Seebachia	S. ("Eoseebachia") sowerbyana	AL2.	2 left valves.	An astartid.	
Spondylopecten	S. (Spondylopecten) palinurus	AL1.	2 left valves.	A pectinid.	
Stegoconcha	S. gmuelleri	AL2.	2 articulated specimens.	A pinnid.	

Brachiopods

Brachiopods of the Antalo Limestone
Genus	Species	Presence	Material	Notes	Images
cf. Amydroptychus	cf. A. sp.	Base of AL2.	10 individuals.	A rhynchonellid.	
Cererithyris	C. sp.	1 from AL1, 105 from AL2 .	106 individuals.	A terebratulid.	
Cymatorhynchia	C. sp.	AL2.	16 individuals.	A rhynchonellid.	
Daghanirhynchia	D. sp.	3 individuals from AL1, 51 from AL2.	54 individuals.	A rhynchonellid.	
Monsardithyris	M. sp.	AL2.	20 individuals.	A terebratulid.	
Somalirhynchia	S. africana	Mostly from AL2.	More than 100 individuals.	A rhynchonellid.	

Cnidarian

Cnidarians of the Antalo Limestone
Genus	Species	Presence	Material	Notes	Images
Actinastrea	A. crassoramosa	47 specimens from AL1, 13 from AL2.	60 larger fragments of colonies.	A stony coral.	
Coenastraea	C. arabica	AL2.	1 specimen.	A stony coral.	
Collignonastraea	C. cf. grossouvrei	AL2.	1 specimen.	A stony coral.	
Columnocoenia	C. gemmans	AL1.	2 specimens.	A stony coral.	
Comoseris	C. meandrinoides	AL3.	1 complete colony.	A stony coral.	
Cladophyllia	C. excelsa	AL3.	1 specimen.	A stony coral.	
Cryptocoenia	C. slovenica	7 specimens from AL1, 4 specimens from AL2.	11 specimens.	A stony coral.	
Ironella	I. arabica	AL1.	12 specimens.	A stony coral.	
Isastrea	I. bernensis	20 specimens from AL1, 22 specimens from AL2.	42 specimens.	A stony coral.	
Kobyastraea	K. lomontiana	AL1.	1 specimen.	A stony coral.	
Latiastrea	L. greppini	2 from AL1, 3 from AL2.	5 specimens.	A stony coral.	
Lochmaeosmilia	L. trapeziformis	AL1.	16 karger fragments of colonies.	A stony coral.	
Ovalastrea	O. michelini	AL2.	3 specimens (including 1 complete colony).	A stony coral.	

Echinoderms

Echinoderms of the Antalo Limestone
Genus	Species	Presence	Material	Notes	Images
Ausichicrinites	A. zelenskyyi		Nearly complete specimen.	A comatulid.	
Pygurus	P. meslei	Upper part of the formation.		A sea urchin.	

Molluscs

Molluscs of the Antalo Limestone
Genus	Species	Presence	Material	Notes	Images
Orthosphinctes	O. aff. tiziani	Top part of sub-unit II.	5 fragmentary specimens.	An ataxioceratid ammonite.	
Pachyceras	P. cf. lalandeanum	From the middle part of sub-unit II, GPS location 10°02′39.7″N, 38°13′53.7″E.	One poorly preserved specimen (no. AF020).	A pachyceratid ammonite.	
Paracenoceras	P. cf. ennianus	Top part of sub-unit II.	1 specimen (no. AF012).	A nautiloid.	
Paracenoceras	P. aff. prohexagonum	Lower Limestone Member.		A nautiloid.	
Paracenoceras	P. cf. kumagunense	Top part of sub-unit II.	1 specimen (no. AF004).	A nautiloid.	
Paracenoceras	P. cf. giganteum	Middle part of sub-unit II.	1 specimen (no. AF005).	A nautiloid.	
Purpuroidea	P. aff. gigas	One specimen (AF025) from the top part of sub-unit I; One specimen (AF026) from the top part of sub-unit II.	2 specimen (AF025 and AF026).	A gastropod.	

== Limestone and karst geomorphology ==
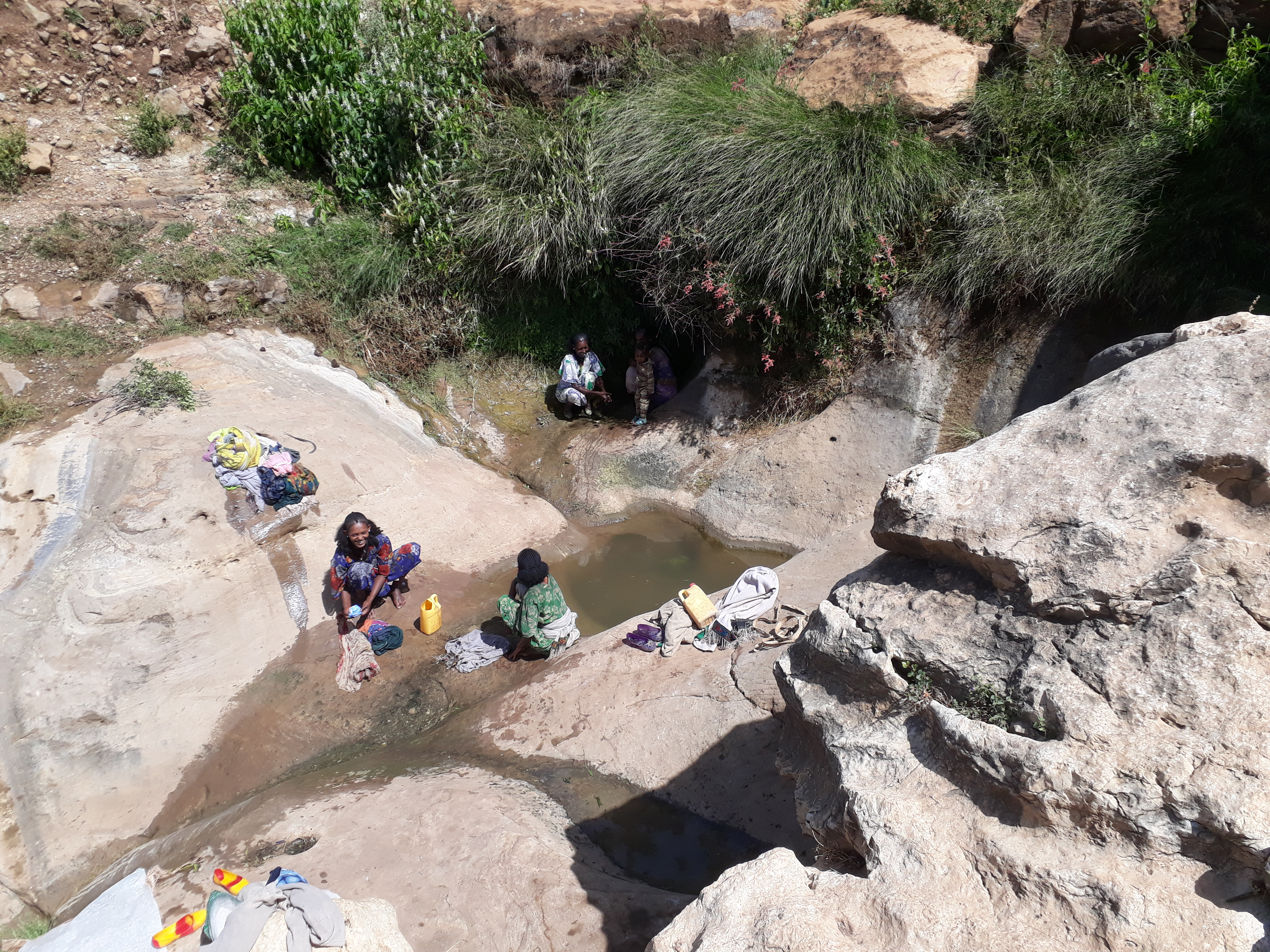
A spring in Antalo Limestone at Santarfa

The layering is sub-horizontal, the same as that of the underlying sedimentary formations. This gives rise to a structural sub-horizontal relief, with alternating cliffs and flats. Dissolution processes in limestone lead to the occurrence of caves. Most described caves in Mesozoic limestone in Ethiopia are located in the Harrar region (Sof Omar cave) and in the Dogu'a Tembien district of Tigray.

== Traditional uses of Antalo Limestone ==
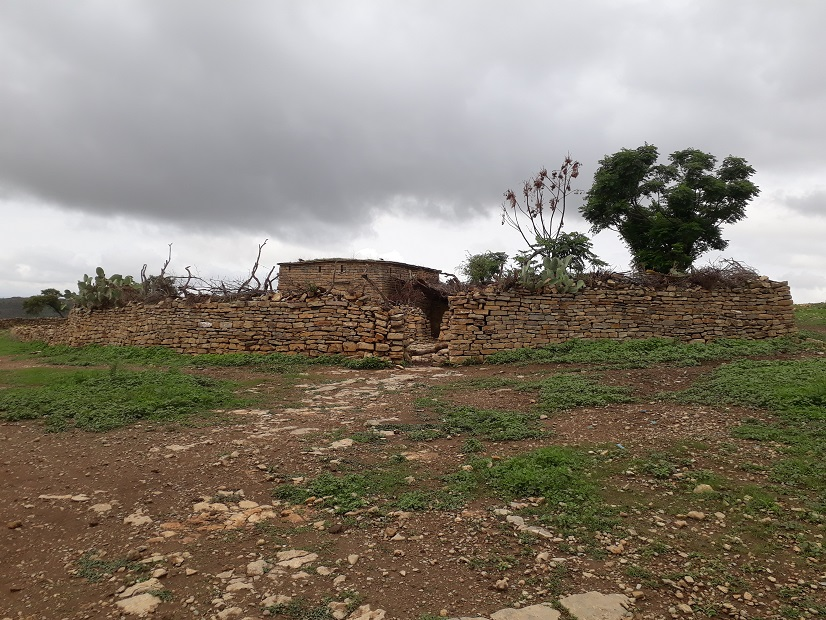
Antalo Limestone is commonly used for house building; here a homestead in Addi Ateroman in Dogu'a Tembien

Given its nearly rectangular shape and its strength, the hard layers of Antalo Limestone are used for

- House building. Traditionally, fermented mud will be used as mortar
- Fencing of homesteads, generally in dry masonry
- Milling stone: for this purpose plucked-bedrock pits, small rock-cut basins that naturally occur in rivers with kolks, are excavated from the river bed and further shaped. Milling is done at home using an elongated small boulder (mano)
- Door and window lintels
- Footpath paving
- Stone bunds or gedeba: terrace walls in dry masonry, typically laid out along the contour for sake of soil and water conservation
- Check dams in gullies for sake of gully erosion control
- Cobble stones, sold to the towns for paving secondary streets

== See also ==
- Ausichicrinites
