= List of fossiliferous stratigraphic units in Djibouti =

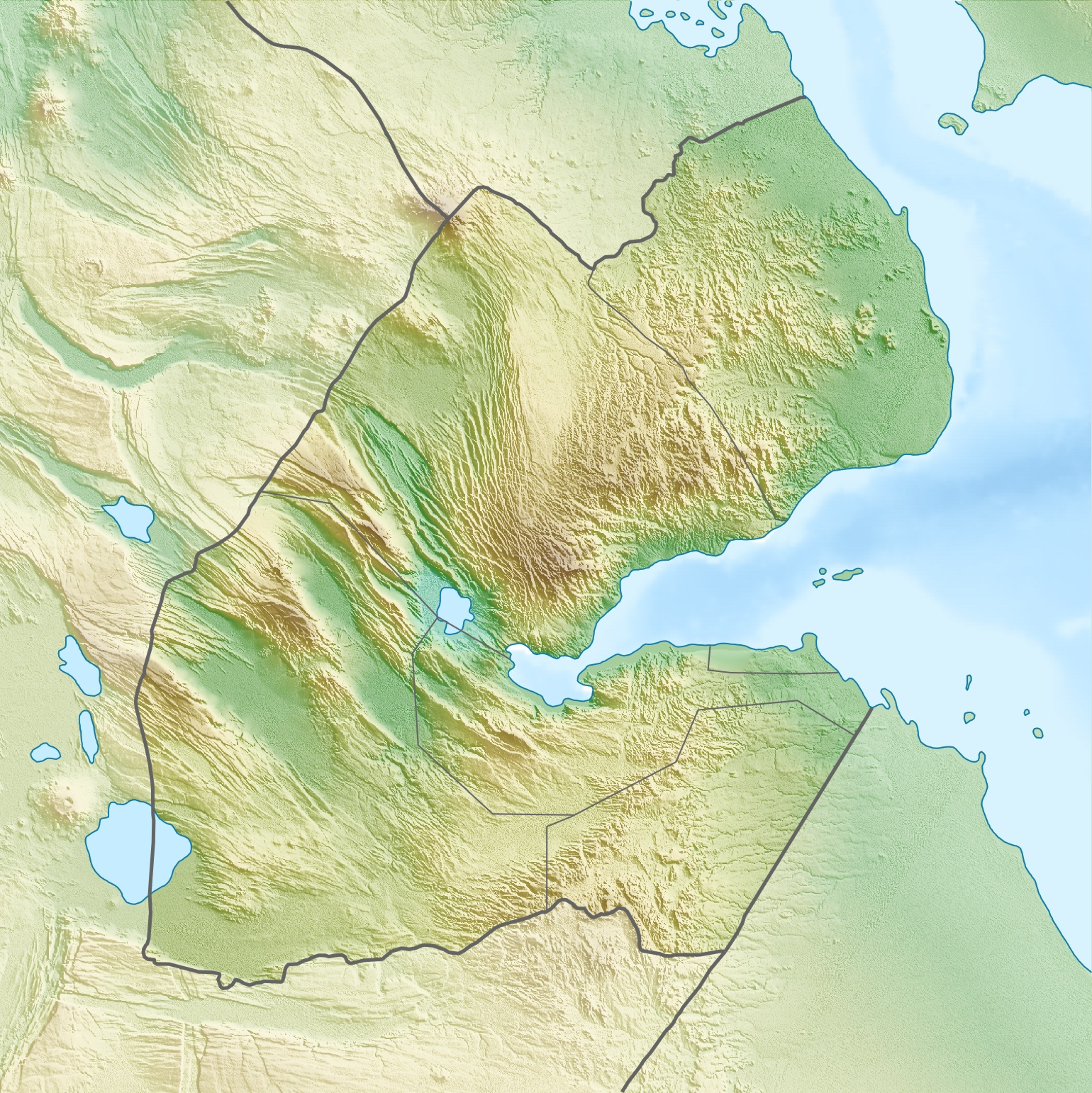
Fossiliferous stratigraphic units in Djibouti
Pleistocene

This is a list of fossiliferous stratigraphic units in Djibouti.

== List of fossiliferous stratigraphic units ==
Locality	Age (Ma)	Period	Fossils	Notes
ETE 1306; Annabokoma, Anabo Koma	1.6-0.3 (Suids); 1.9-0.9 (Chekheyti)	Mid-Late Pleistocene	Palaeoloxodon recki, Hippopotamus cf. gorgops, Heterobranchus sp.	
ETE 1311; E-Gobaad	1.8-1.2	Middle Pleistocene	Palaeoloxodon recki, Crocuta aff. crocuta, Equus quagga burchelli, Equus cf. tabeti, Hippopotamus cf. gorgops, Hystrix cf. cristata, Aepyceros sp., Beatragus sp., Connochaetes sp., Hippotragus sp., Kobus sp., Redunca sp., Antilopinae sp., Giraffidae indet., Suidae indet., Crocodylus niloticus, Geochelone sp.	
ETE 1309; S-W Assal	2.34-0.8	Early-Late Pleistocene	Antidorcas recki, Metridiochoerus andrewsi, Metridiochoerus cf. hopwoodi, Palaeoloxodon recki, Sivatherium maurusium, Hipparion cf. cornelianum, Hippopotamus cf. amphibius, Kobus cf. kob, Kolpochoerus cf. phacochoeroides, Pelorovis cf. oldowayensis, Aepyceros sp., Ceratotherium sp., Damaliscus sp., Syncerus sp.	

== See also ==
- Lists of fossiliferous stratigraphic units in Africa
  - List of fossiliferous stratigraphic units in Eritrea
  - List of fossiliferous stratigraphic units in Ethiopia
- Geology of Djibouti
