= Habila =

Habila حبيلة
- Location in Sudan
- Coordinates: 13°42′8″N 31°6′50″E
- Country: Sudan
- State: North Kordofan
- Time zone: UTC+2 (CAT)

Habila (Arabic: حبيلة) is a small town in central Sudan, located several kilometres southeast of Umm Dam.

== Economy ==
An agricultural town, the area was first developed for mechanized rain-fed agriculture in 1968. The idea was to use the fertile cracking clay soils that were not suited to traditional agriculture to try to improve food shortage problems. There was eventually enough produced in Habila to create surpluses for export.

The government encouraged private investment in Habila and the land was divided into feddans (about 0.4 ha), which were then leased out to private operators. The original leases were to be left fallow after four years and new leases were to be let for adjacent fallow plots to prevent soil exhaustion. By 1979, about 147 000 ha were officially leased under official schemes sorghum but production was greatly expanded and the proportion of fallow land decreased dramatically, with about 45 per cent of mechanized agriculture produced in illegal areas by 1985. Farmers who sought quick profits eventually led the land to exhaustion. This occurred in many other places in Sudan following government policy in the 1970s to "become the bread basket of the Arab world". Poor planning led to drought, internal warfare and famine as the soils become unfertile and unsustainable in Habila and reached a crisis in 1994.
