= List of fossiliferous stratigraphic units in Sudan =

Fossiliferous stratigraphic units in Sudan
Nubia Formation
Abu Imama Formation
Wadi Milk Formation
Shendi Formation
Wadi Howar Formation
Bentiu & Abu Gabra Formations

This is a list of fossiliferous stratigraphic units in Sudan.

Formation	Member	Period	Notes
Nubia Formation		Holocene	
Abu Imama Formation		Middle Miocene	
Wadi Milk Formation	Wadi Abu Hashim	Campanian-Maastrichtian	
Shendi Formation		Campanian	
Wadi Howar Formation		Coniacian-Santonian	
Abu Agag Formation		Turonian	
Bentiu Formation		Barremian-Cenomanian	
Abu Gabra Formation		Barremian-Aptian	

== See also ==
- Lists of fossiliferous stratigraphic units in Africa
  - List of fossiliferous stratigraphic units in Eritrea
  - List of fossiliferous stratigraphic units in Ethiopia
- Geology of Sudan
