= Wadi al-Malik =

Bed of an extinct river in Sudan

Coordinates: 18.0500°N 30.9500°E

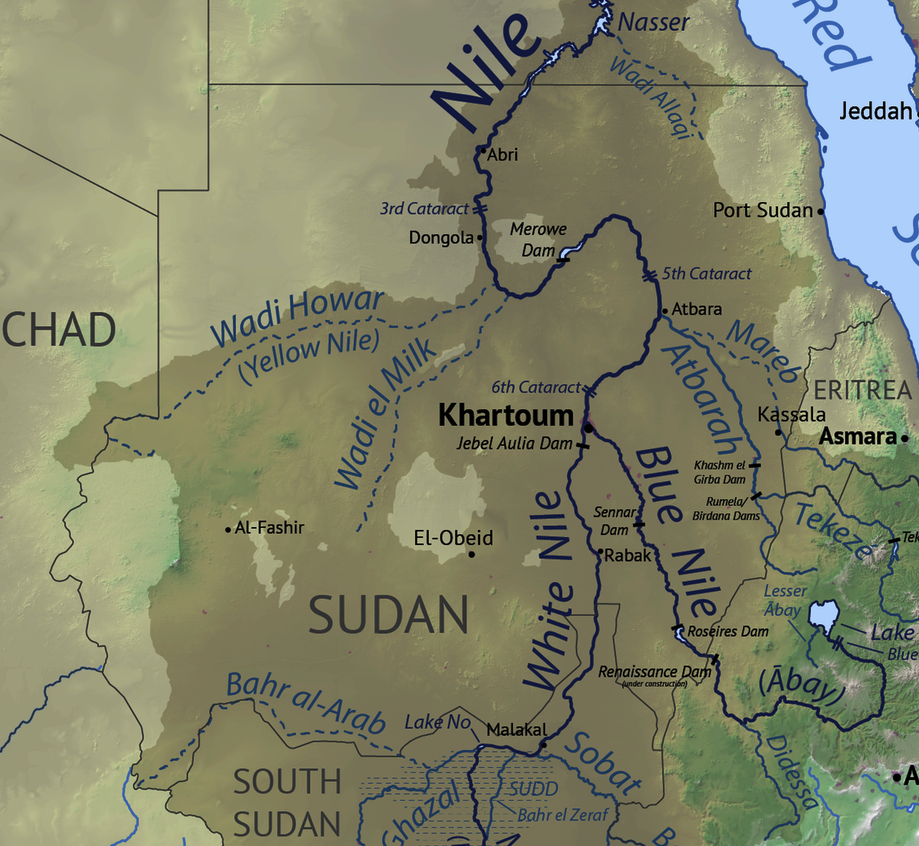
Map showing the Nile basin in Sudan, with the Wadi al-Malik (Centre)

Wadi al-Malik, also written as Wadi el-Milk is the bed of an extinct river in Sudan. Following the Central African Shear Zone, it stretches for 560 km from the lake of Umm Badr in North Kurdufan NE-trending to the great bend of the Nile near Al Dabbah. It gives its name to the geological Wadi Milk Formation.
