= Mugher Mudstone =

Late Jurassic geological formation in Ethiopia

- Stratigraphic range: Tithonian; ~152–145 Ma
- Type: Geological formation
- Underlies: Debre Libanos Sandstone, Amba Aradam Formation
- Overlies: Antalo Limestone
- Thickness: 320 m (1,050 ft)

Lithology
- Primary: Mudstone, sandstone
- Other: Gypsum, dolomite, shale (base)

Location
- Coordinates: 9.5°N 38.6°E
- Approximate paleocoordinates: 12.3°S 24.8°E
- Region: Shewa
- Country: Ethiopia
- Extent: Ethiopian Highlands
- Mugher Mudstone (Ethiopia)

The Mugher Mudstone is a geologic formation located in Ethiopia. It dates to the Tithonian stage of the Late Jurassic. The lithology consists of gypsum, dolomite and shale alternations at the base, overlain by mudstone intercalated with fine to medium grained sandstone.

Indeterminate dromaeosaurid teeth are known from the formation. Many other remains have been uncovered also, including indeterminate ornithopods and allosauroids. The tooth of a macronarian sauropod is known from the formation

== See also ==
- List of dinosaur-bearing rock formations
  - List of stratigraphic units with indeterminate dinosaur fossils
- List of fossiliferous stratigraphic units in Ethiopia
- Geology of Ethiopia
