= Rollerites =

Rollerites Temporal range: Callovian

Scientific classification
- Kingdom: Animalia
- Phylum: Mollusca
- Class: Cephalopoda
- Subclass: †Ammonoidea
- Order: †Ammonitida
- Family: †Pachyceratidae
- Genus: †Rollerites; Jeannet, 1951

Species
- Rollierites dimidiatum Jeannet 1951; Rollierites minuendum Jeannet 1951; Rollierites tenue Jeannet 1951; Rollierites tuba Jeannet 1951

Rollerites is a Jurassic ammonite belonging to the ammonitid.

== Distribution ==
France, Saudi Arabia and Switzerland
