= Al-Meragh =

Archaeological site in Sudan

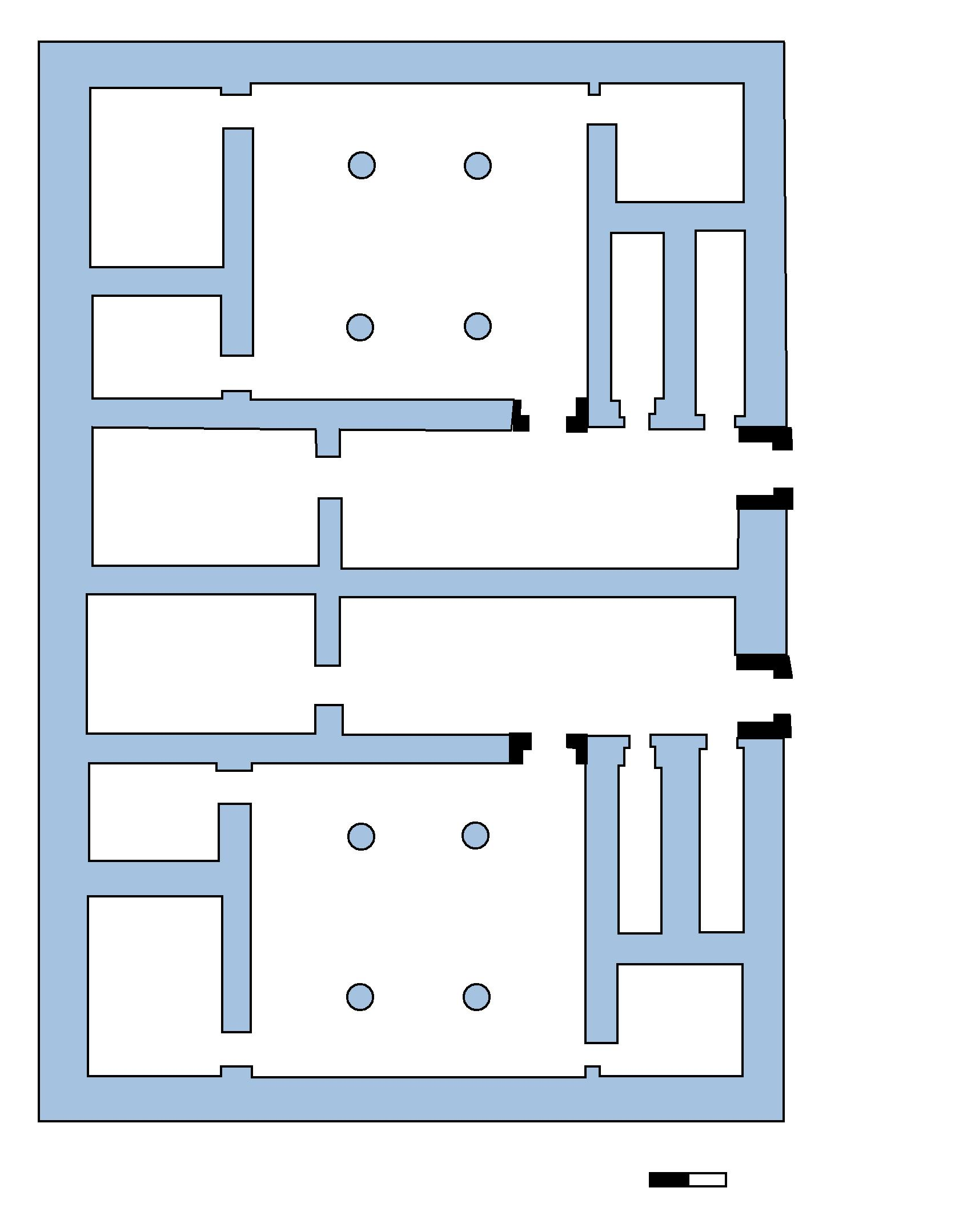
Plan of a house excavated at the Nubian site Al Meragh.

Al-Meragh is an archaeological site in Sudan. It is situated in the Wadi Muqaddam approximately 227 kilometres (141 mi) north of Omdurman in the Bayuda, an area that today is largely desert. A buried Napatan settlement was discovered at al-Meragh in 1999-2000. The site consists of two houses with stone pillars and stone door frames. Both buildings are oriented in the same way, which assumes a uniform plan. It appears that the place was inhabited by only one or two generations and was then destroyed by fire, apparently by nomads. The function of this settlement may have involved an administrative center as Nubians colonized in this area.
