= Gebel al-Ain =

Mountain in Sudan

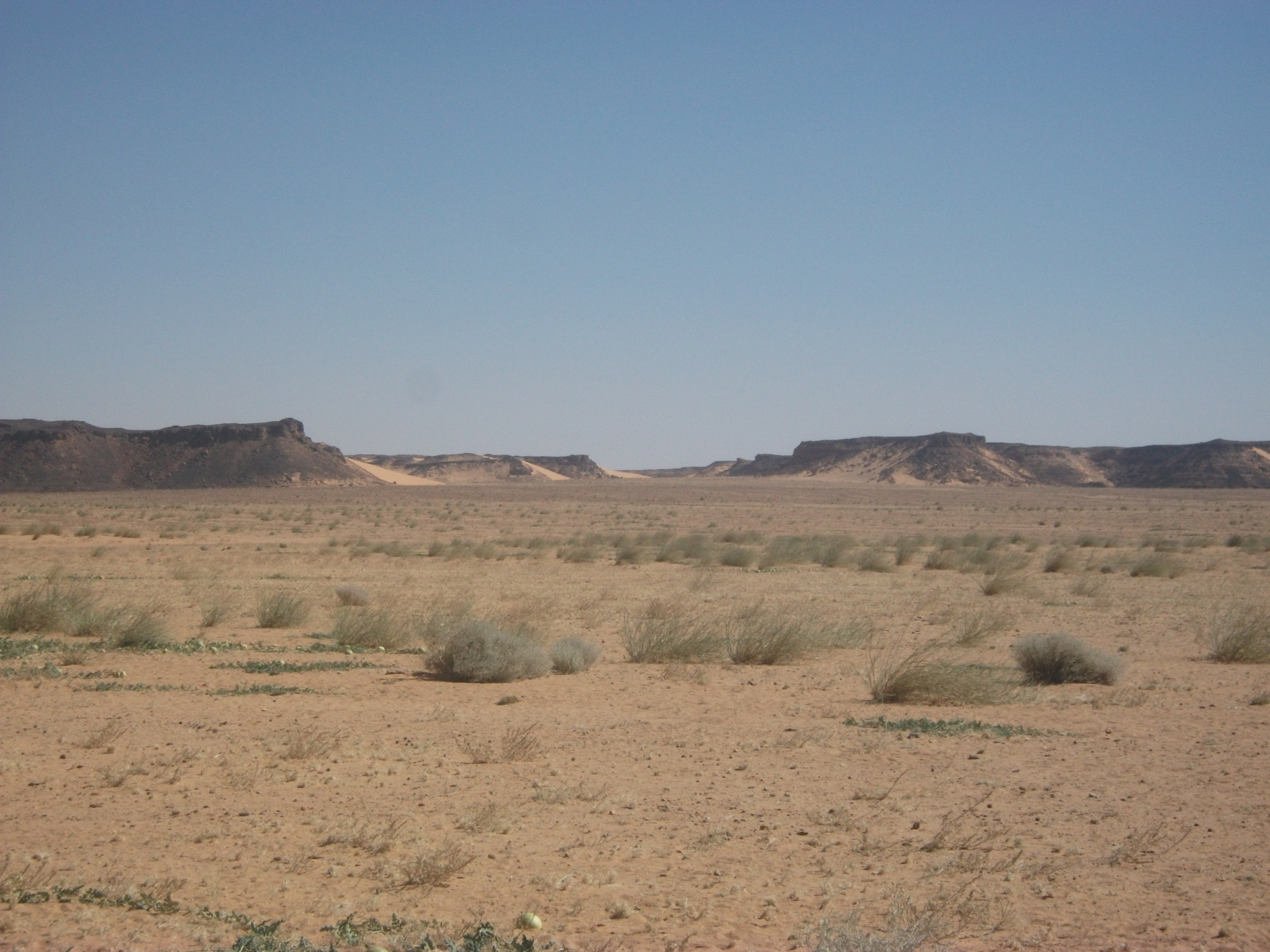

Highest point
- Elevation: 570 m (1,870 ft)
- Coordinates: 16°35′00″N 29°15′12″E

Geography
- Location within Sudan
- Country: Sudan
- Region: Northern State/North Kordofan

Gebel al-Ain is a plateau in Sudan at the border between the Northern State and North Kordofan.

The Gebel al-Ain area is more fertile than the surrounding dry savannah, making it a popular grazing ground for the Kababish-nomads dwelling around it.

Around the Gebel al-Ain many archaeological sites are situated, mostly graveyards of the post-Meroitic and medieval Christian period. The most prominent archaeological sites are a ruined monastery in the west of the mountain – the south-westernmost outpost of the Makurian state known so far – and a settlement of round huts with a surrounding wall close to Bir al-Ain southwest of the main top of the mountain.
