= Usno Formation =

Geologic formation in Ethiopia

- Stratigraphic range: Pliocene
- Type: Geological formation
- Unit of: Omo Group
- Underlies: Kalam Formation
- Overlies: Mursi Formation

Lithology
- Primary: Sandstone

Location
- Coordinates: 5.3°N 36.0°E
- Approximate paleocoordinates: 5.1°N 35.7°E
- Country: Ethiopia
- Extent: Omo Subbasin; Turkana Basin
- Usno Formation (Ethiopia)

The Usno Formation is a palaeontological formation located in Ethiopia. It dates to the Pliocene period.

== See also ==
- List of fossil sites
- List of fossiliferous stratigraphic units in Ethiopia
