= List of fossiliferous stratigraphic units in Eritrea =

Fossiliferous stratigraphic units in Eritrea
Danakil Formation
Dogali Formation
Antalo Limestone

This is a list of fossiliferous stratigraphic units in Eritrea.

Group	Formation	Period	Notes
Red Series Group	Danakil Formation	Pleistocene	
	Dogali Formation	Oligocene	
	Antalo Limestone	Callovian-Tithonian	

== See also ==
- Lists of fossiliferous stratigraphic units in Africa
  - List of fossiliferous stratigraphic units in Ethiopia
  - List of fossiliferous stratigraphic units in Sudan
- Geology of Eritrea
