= Umm Dam =

Umm Dam ام دم
- Town
- Location in Sudan
- Coordinates: 13°45′N 30°59′E
- Country: Sudan
- State: North Kurdufan

Umm Dam (Arabic: ام دم) is a town in North Kurdufan State in central Sudan 60 kilometres north east of El Obeid. It lies about halfway between Surur to the northwest and Habila to the southeast.
