= Ethiopia-Yemen Continental Flood Basalts =

Geological eruption during Oligocene

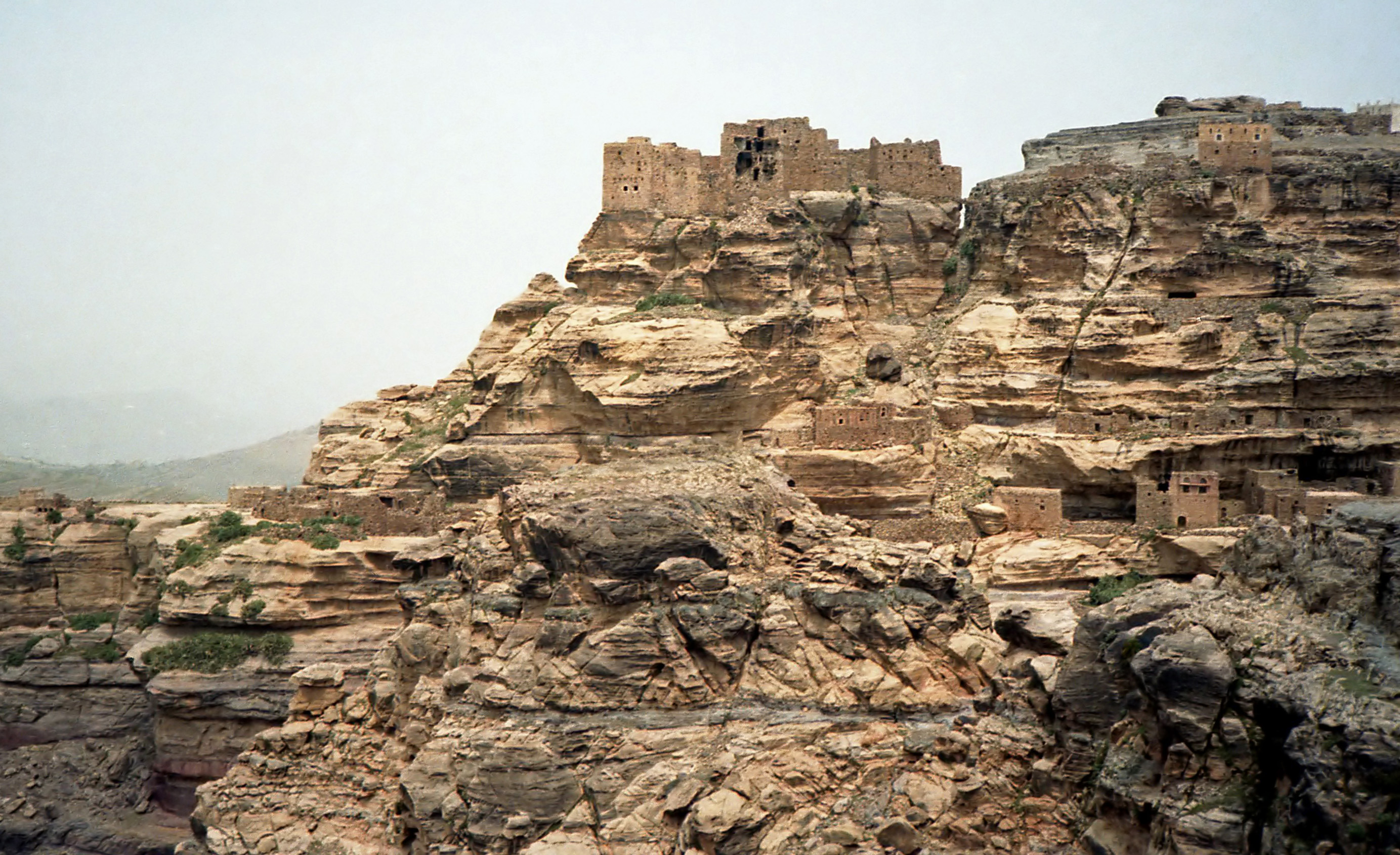
Shibam-Kawkaban ignimbrite, Yemen, part of the Ethiopia-Yemen CFB

The Ethiopia-Yemen Continental Flood Basalts were erupted during the Oligocene around 30 million years ago. They cover an area of about 600,000 km^{2} in Yemen and Ethiopia, with an estimated volume of greater than 350,000 km^{3}. They are associated with the Afar Plume and the initiation of rifting in the southern Red Sea and Gulf of Aden.

In Ethiopia flood basalts cover an old erosion surface with occasional flat areas or peneplains. Burial of old surfaces by lava has preserved laterite soils in both Yemen and Ethiopia.

== Composition ==
The lavas of the Ethiopia-Yemen CFB show systematic variations in composition both vertically and laterally. Most of the lavas are basalts, but those closest to the Afar Triangle being very high titanium transitional basalts and picrites, passing outwards into high-Ti tholeiitic basalts and finally into low-Ti tholeiitic basalts. The sequence is also an example of bimodal volcanism and the uppermost part typically contains significant amounts of rhyolitic lavas.
