= North Kordofan =

State of Sudan

North Kordofan شمال كردفان Šamāl Kurdufān
- State
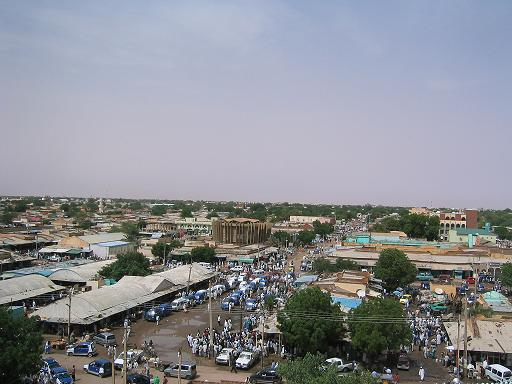
- El Obeid (2006)

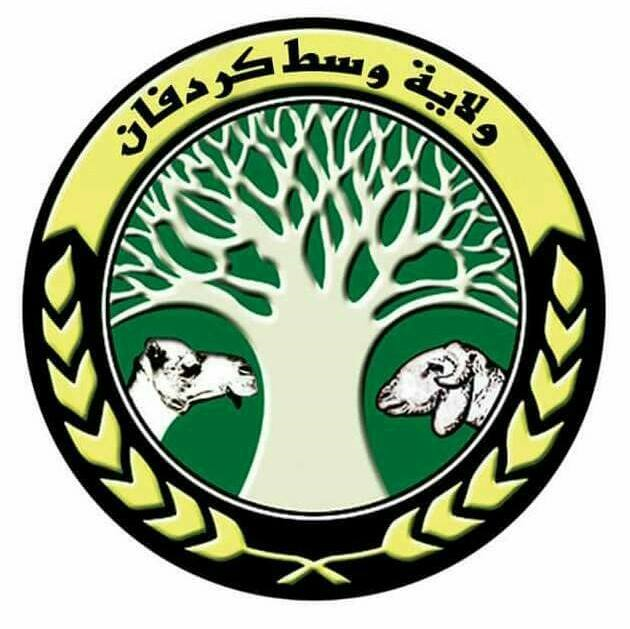
- Seal

- Location in Sudan.
- Coordinates: 14°22′N 29°32′E
- Country: Sudan
- Region: Kordofan
- Capital: El Obeid

Government
  - Governor: Khaled Mustafa Adam Othman

Area
  - Total: 185,302 km^{2} (71,546 sq mi)

Population (2018)
  - Total: 3,174,029
- Time zone: UTC+2 (CAT)
- HDI (2017): 0.463 low

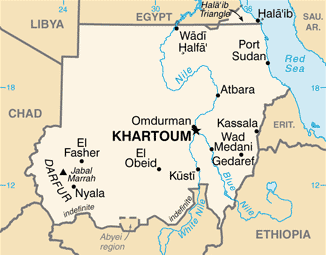
Towns in the region.

North Kordofan (Arabic: شمال كردفان, romanized: Šamāl Kurdufān) is one of the 18 wilayat or states of Sudan. It has an area of 185,302 km^{2} and an estimated population of 3,174,029 people (2018 est). El Obeid is the capital of the state. It borders Northern to the north, Khartoum and White Nile to the east, South Kordofan and West Kordofan to the south, and North Darfur to the west.

North Kordofan's climate is arid to semi-arid.

== History ==
A graffiti of a Makurian king was discovered in Abu Negila For centuries, North Kordofan was inhabited by nomads and pastoralists, mainly the Dar Hamid, Dar Hamar, Guamaa, Kababish, Bideriya, Shwehat and including the Yazeed tribes. The area has had almost continuous drought since the mid-1960s. Deforestation led to the destruction of the natural vegetation. NGOs working in the villages of Sudan tried to rectify the damage. They set up women's centres. These centres allowed many women gain an income. Training was introduced and a solar energy system set up. NGOs recognise that a need exists for longer projects requiring the kind of support that only can come from governments and large agencies.

=== Sudanese civil war ===
At the beginning of the Sudanese civil war in April 2023 the Rapid Support Forces (RSF) captured the El Obeid Airport from the Sudanese Army contingent. Throughout April and May, the Sudanese Army repelled several RSF assaults on the state capital. By June 2023, the RSF fully surrounded the city and laid siege to it. The siege was lifted in February 2025, but resumed later that year. Amid warnings that a massacre like the one in El-Fasher could be repeated, the UN Security Council adopted a statement on June 20 of 2026 expressing concern over the “imminent risk of mass atrocities” and demanding that the RSF immediately halt their attack on El Obeid. On June 23, seven European countries also called on the RSF in a joint statement to immediately halt their attack on the city. There were reportedly "credible signs of an imminent offensive."

According to the UNHCR, people along the routes through Kordofan have been subjected to a documented pattern of executions, abductions, torture and abuse, sexual violence, and robbery.

Due to the ensuing refugee crisis the state housed as of March 2026 around 231,000 internally displaced persons (IDPs) according to the International Organization for Migration (IOM) Displacement Tracking Matrix (DTM).

Number of IDPs in North Kordofan
Locality	May 2023	May 2024	May 2025	May 2026
Ar Rahad	5.457	42.763	42.338	43.997
Bara	1.501	32.225	36.734	14.723
Gebrat Al Sheikh	869	7.283	8.403	8.553
Gharb Bara	3.845	8.036	9.200	11.132
Sheikan	4.357	43.277	49.408	105.722
Soudari	1.959	3.968	3.968	3.968
Um Dam Haj Ahmed	1.840	15.156	15.156	12.289
Um Rawaba	3.695	41.916	38.209	33.982

== Geography ==
=== Climate ===
North Kordofan's climate is arid in the north and semi-arid in the south. The northern parts of the state receive 100 millimetres (3.9 in) of rain per year on average, while the southern parts receive up to 350 millimetres (14 in). The rainy season lasts from June to September. Rainfall is variable year to year, with no permanent rivers existing in the state. North Kordofan has been in state of drought almost continuously since the 1960s.

Climate data for El Obeid (El Obeid Airport) (1991–2020 normals, extremes 1961–2020)
Month	Jan	Feb	Mar	Apr	May	Jun	Jul	Aug	Sep	Oct	Nov	Dec	Year
Record high °C (°F)	40.5 (104.9)	43 (109)	44.5 (112.1)	45.8 (114.4)	45 (113)	43.7 (110.7)	41 (106)	40 (104)	40 (104)	42.3 (108.1)	40 (104)	38 (100)	45.8 (114.4)
Mean daily maximum °C (°F)	30.0 (86.0)	32.7 (90.9)	36.1 (97.0)	39.1 (102.4)	39.3 (102.7)	37.7 (99.9)	34.1 (93.4)	32.3 (90.1)	34.7 (94.5)	36.8 (98.2)	34.0 (93.2)	30.9 (87.6)	34.8 (94.6)
Daily mean °C (°F)	21.8 (71.2)	24.4 (75.9)	27.8 (82.0)	31.0 (87.8)	32.0 (89.6)	31.1 (88.0)	28.6 (83.5)	27.4 (81.3)	28.5 (83.3)	29.7 (85.5)	26.4 (79.5)	22.9 (73.2)	27.6 (81.7)
Mean daily minimum °C (°F)	13.7 (56.7)	16.1 (61.0)	19.6 (67.3)	22.9 (73.2)	24.7 (76.5)	24.5 (76.1)	23.0 (73.4)	22.5 (72.5)	22.3 (72.1)	22.6 (72.7)	18.7 (65.7)	14.9 (58.8)	20.4 (68.7)
Record low °C (°F)	4 (39)	5 (41)	9.7 (49.5)	12.7 (54.9)	16 (61)	16 (61)	11.5 (52.7)	13.7 (56.7)	14.9 (58.8)	12.5 (54.5)	8 (46)	4.7 (40.5)	4 (39)
Average precipitation mm (inches)	0.2 (0.01)	0.0 (0.0)	0.1 (0.00)	4.8 (0.19)	17.2 (0.68)	39.0 (1.54)	122.2 (4.81)	139.9 (5.51)	59.9 (2.36)	17.7 (0.70)	0.2 (0.01)	0.0 (0.0)	401.2 (15.80)
Average precipitation days (≥ 1.0 mm)	0.0	0.0	0.1	0.5	1.9	3.2	8.3	9.9	5.8	2.4	0.1	0.0	32
Average relative humidity (%)	24	19	15	17	28	44	61	70	62	40	25	27	36
Mean monthly sunshine hours	300.7	266.0	272.8	264.0	241.8	228.0	195.3	192.2	225.0	272.8	303.0	310.0	3,071.6
Source: NOAA

=== Mountains, hydrology and wildlife ===
North Kordofan is located in the southeastern Sahara. To the north in the Northern State near the border with North Kordofan lies the Gebel al-Ain mountain plateau, which stretches from southwest to northeast. Running south of this plateau, also in a southwest-to-northeast direction, runs the Wadi al-Malik, which flows into the Nile near Al Dabbah, outside North Kordofan. Um Badr lake is situated within the wadi's catchment area, with the town Umm Badr located on its western shore. The lake and its surroundings are designated as an Important Bird Area (IBA) by BirdLife International; species found there include the Nubian bustard (classified as vulnerable by the IUCN) and the Arabian bustard (classified as near-threatened). Another wadi is Wadi Muqaddam, located in the northeast of the state. Soil samples suggest that the White Nile in earlier times flowed through it. The Kordofan region has four main aquifers. The groundwater lies at depths ranging from 241 to 310 meters and is used primarily for human consumption and watering livestock.

In the far southeast of the state, south of the road from Er Rahad via Umm Ruwaba to the White Nile near Kosti, lies the Khor Abu Habil Inner Delta, an internationally important wetland designated under the Ramsar Convention on April 10, 2022. During the rainy season between July and October, hundreds of temporary pools (known as "mayas") form amidst the dunes. This area, largely untouched by agriculture, also includes some remnants of forest and is an important habitat for waterbirds. Several endangered bird species, such as the critically endangered Sociable lapwing and the Rüppell's vulture, have also been seen here.

=== Administrative divisions ===
==== Current Localities ====
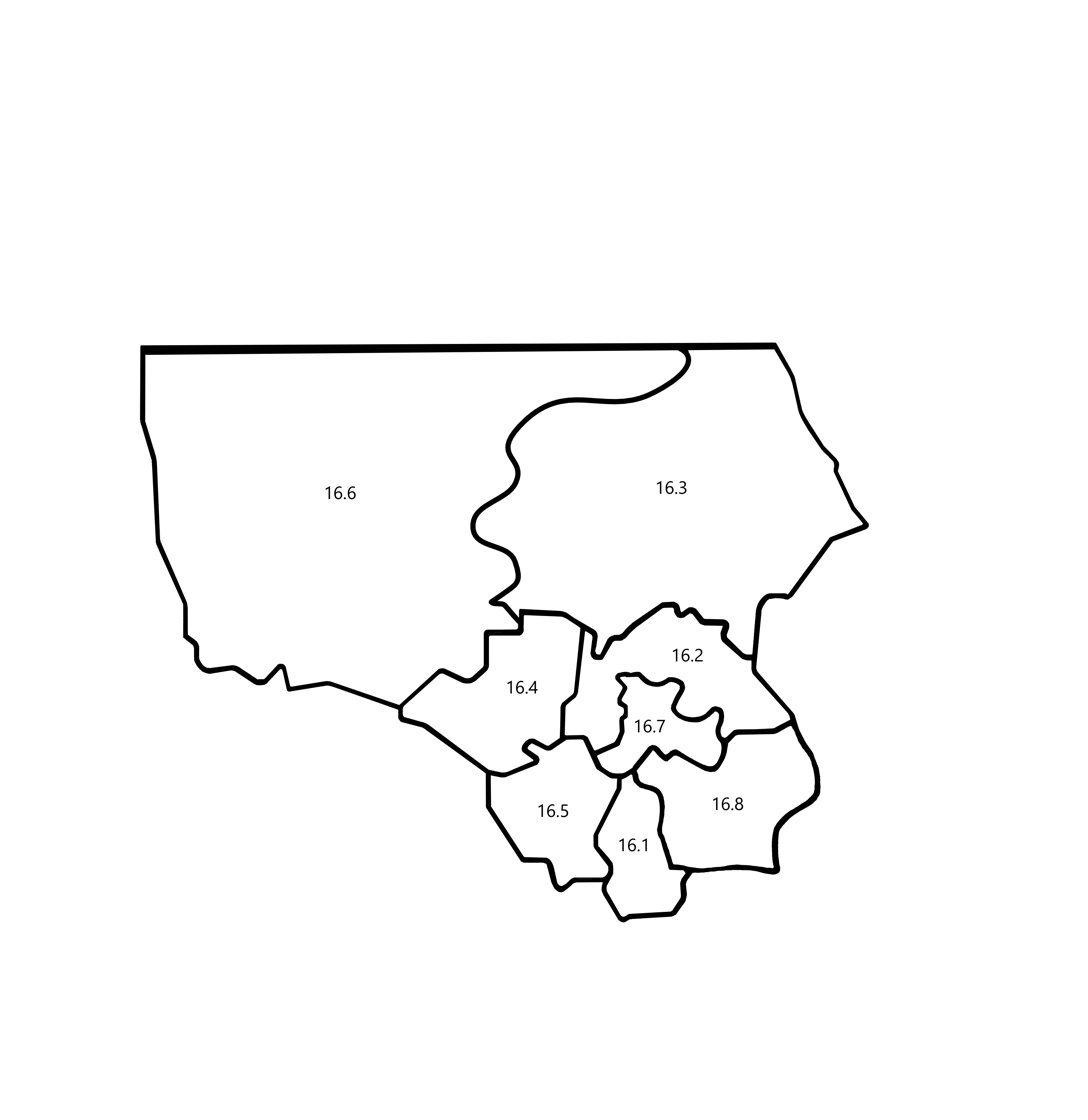
Localities in North Kordofan (see table)

The state is divided into eight localities:

	English	Arabic	area [km²]
16.1	Ar Rahad	الرهد	5,674.8
16.2	Bara	بارا	11,563.6
16.3	Gebrat Al Sheikh	جبرة الشيخ	50,968.2
16.4	Gharb Bara	غرب بارا	11,280.2
16.5	Sheikan	شيكان	8,407.6
16.6	Soudari	سودري	81,591.2
16.7	Um Dam Haj Ahmed	أم دم حاج أحمد	4,992.3
16.8	Um Rawaba	أم روابة	11,671.3

==== Former Districts ====
Districts of North Kurdufan

1. Sowdari District
2. Jebrat al Sheikh District
3. Sheikan District
4. Bara District
5. Um Rawaba District

=== Cities and towns ===
- Abu Qawad
- Alouba
- El Obeid (capital)
- Er Rahad
- Umm Ruwaba
- Bara
- Gibaish
- Sodari
- Umm Badr
- Umm Dam

== Economy ==
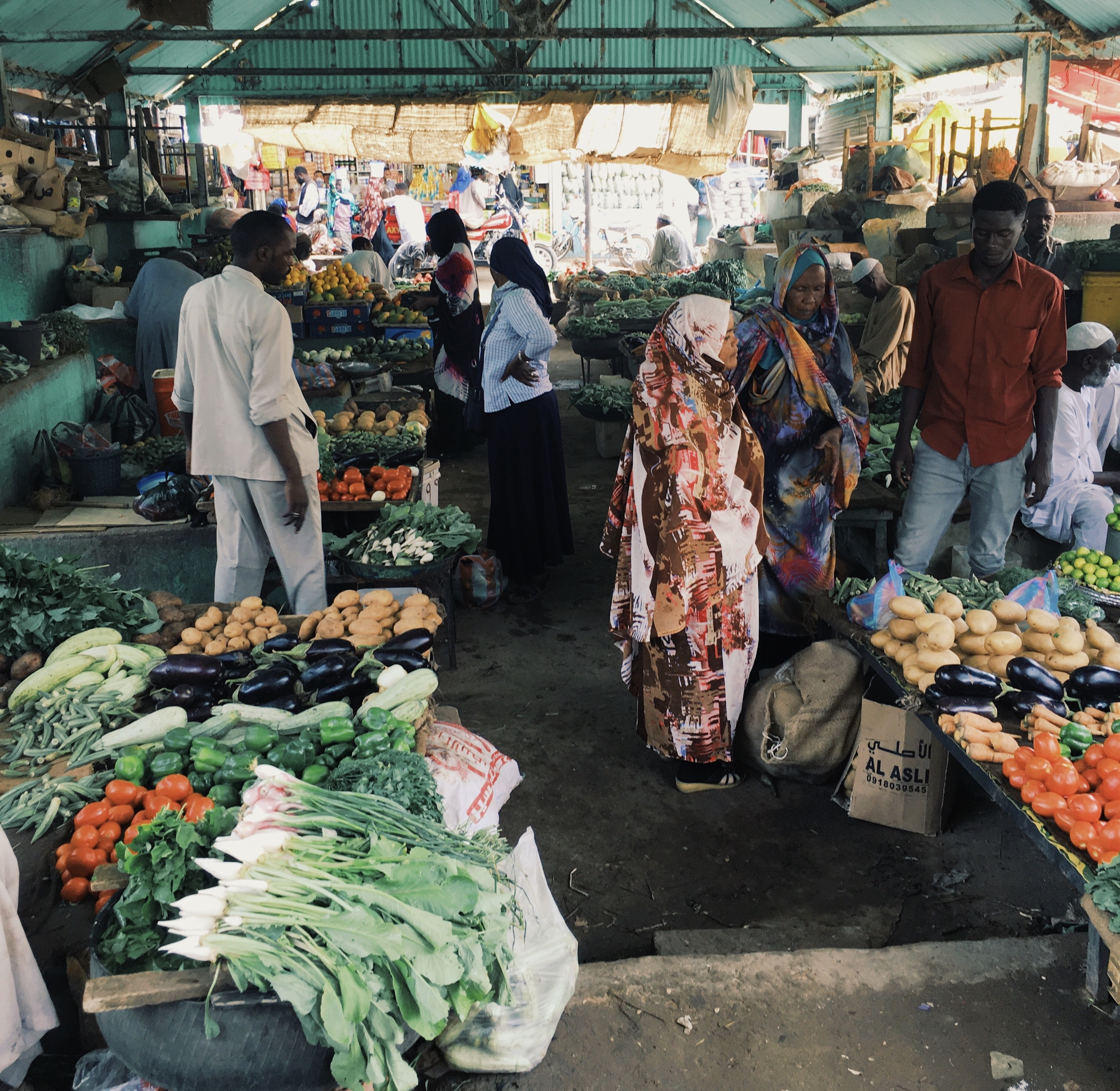
Market in El Obeid (2022)

The most productive agricultural lands are found in the east of the state, while livestock is raised in the semi-desert areas of the west. Due to long dry seasons, lower-income households typically engage in agriculture and wage labor from April to December. Outside this period, they pursue various non-agricultural activities to secure their livelihoods, such as odd jobs in urban centers or gold mining in more remote areas. Higher-income individuals generally derive their income from livestock farming and retail trade. Traditionally, native gum arabic trees (Senegalia senegal) are also tapped for gum arabic production during the winter months from October to April. However, the northern limit of the trees and consequently the production zone has shifted southward from 15° N to 13° 45' N as of 2003 since the 1950s. Since these trees serve as a natural fertilizer in the region, this shift also impacts agriculture in the northern areas of the state.

The state capital El Obeid is an important trading center through which trade between eastern and western Sudan flows. The city is also home to an oil refinery that, at full capacity, processes 15,000 barrels per day, primarily into heating oil. According to Radio Dabanga, the refinery's office was looted by RSF militias in June 2023.

== Culture ==
The singer Hawa Al-Tagtaga was from the region.

== See also ==
- 2007 Sudan floods
- Kordofan — overall region.
