= Wadi Milk Formation =

Geological formation in Sudan

- Stratigraphic range: Campanian-Maastrichtian
- Type: Geological formation
- Unit of: Ash Shamaliyah
- Sub-units: Wadi Abu Hashim Member

Lithology
- Primary: Sandstone
- Other: Siltstone

Location
- Coordinates: 20.0°N 30.0°E
- Approximate paleocoordinates: 4.4°N 24.7°E
- Country: Sudan
- Extent: Wadi Al-Malik-Bayuda Desert

Type section
- Named for: Wadi Al-Malik
- Wadi Milk Formation (Sudan)

The Wadi Milk Formation is a geological formation in Sudan whose strata date back to the Late Cretaceous. Originally, the formation was thought to be Albian to Cenomanian, later research has provided dating to the Campanian to Maastrichtian. Dinosaur remains are among the fossils that have been recovered from the formation. It stretches from the lower Wadi Al-Malik across the Wadi Muqaddam into the Bayuda Desert.

== Vertebrate paleofauna ==
=== Ornithischians ===
Ornithischians
Taxa	Presence	Images
Euornithopoda (indeterminate remains)	Northern Province, Sudan.	
Iguanodontia (indeterminate remains)	Northern Province, Sudan.	
Ornithopoda (indeterminate remains)	Northern Province, Sudan.	
cf. Ouranosaurus (indeterminate remains)	Northern Province, Sudan.	

=== Saurischians ===
Sauropods
Taxa	Presence	Notes	Images
Dicraeosauridae (indeterminate remains)	Northern Province, Sudan.		
Lithostrotia (indeterminate remains)	Northern Province, Sudan.	"(= Titanosauridae indet.)"	

Theropods
Taxa	Presence	Images
Bahariasaurus: Bahariasaurus sp.	Northern Province, Sudan.	
Carcharodontosauridae (indeterminate remains)	Northern Province, Sudan.	Some specimens are similar to the genus Carcharodontosaurus.
Dromaeosauridae (indeterminate remains)	Northern Province, Sudan.	
Theropoda (indeterminate remains)	Northern Province, Sudan.	

== See also ==
- List of dinosaur-bearing rock formations
- List of fossiliferous stratigraphic units in Sudan
