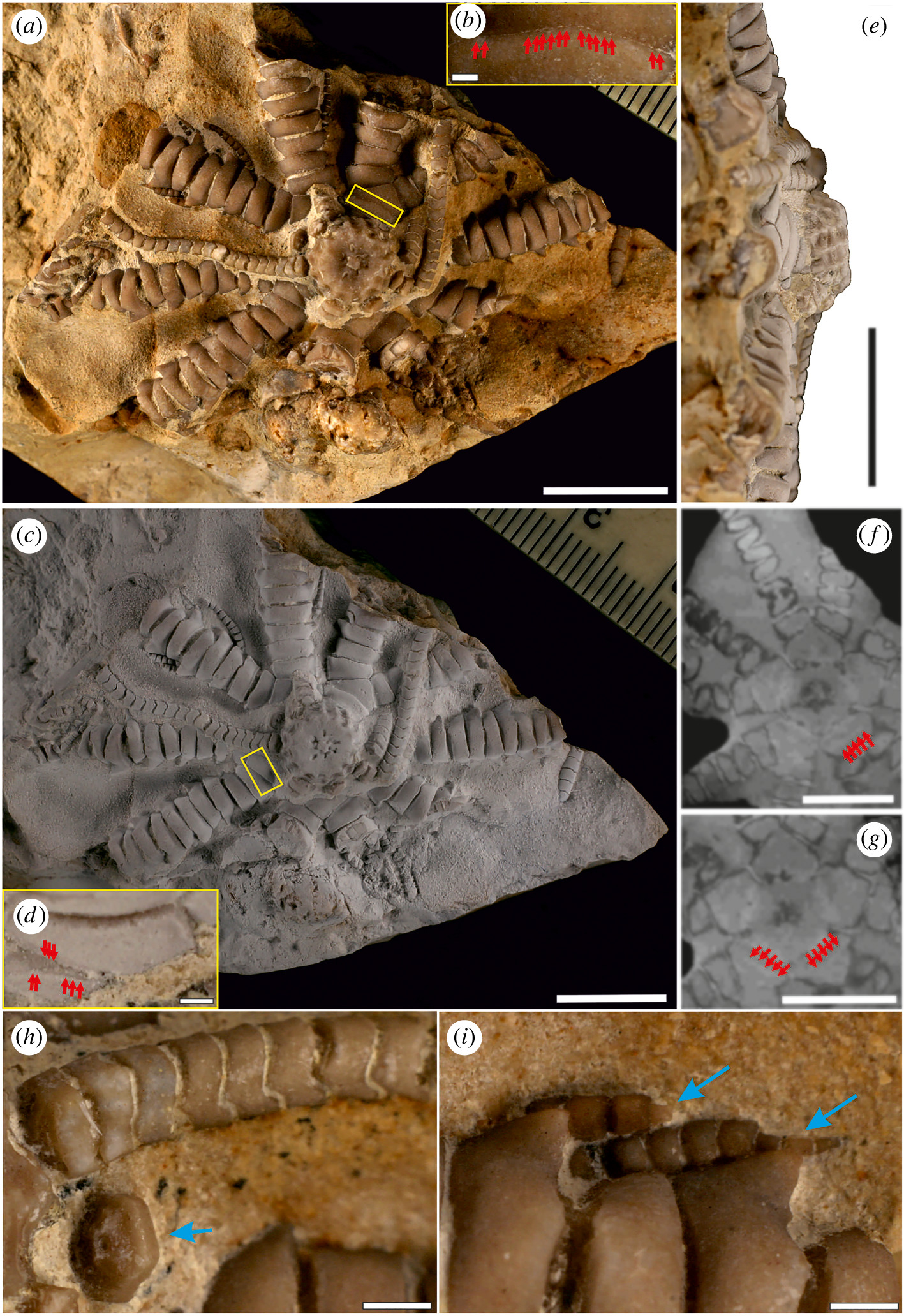
- Fossil of Ausichicrinites zelenskyyi

Scientific classification
- Kingdom: Animalia
- Phylum: Echinodermata
- Class: Crinoidea
- Order: Comatulida
- Family: Solanocrinitidae
- Genus: †Ausichicrinites
- Species: †A. zelenskyyi

Binomial name
- † Ausichicrinites zelenskyyi Salamon et al., 2022

= Ausichicrinites =

Ausichicrinites zelenskyyi Temporal range: 145–145 Ma Tithonian, Late Jurassic

Genus of feather stars (comatulids)

Ausichicrinites is a genus of feather stars (comatulids) in the upper Jurassic period (Tithonian epoch), central western Ethiopia approximately 145 million years ago. This genus was found in the upper part of the Antalo Limestone Formation 2114 meters (6935 feet) in elevation. The genus name Ausichicrinites refers to William I. Aussich, a leading expert on the order comatulids, while the species name Ausichicrinites zelenskyyi was named in honor of the sixth president of Ukraine, Volodymyr Zelenskyy, in support of him during the Russian invasion of Ukraine which was ongoing at the time of its description. A. zelenskyyi is also known to be the first Jurassic comatulid to come from the African continent and is the first nearly complete feather star fossil. The species showed a few similarities with Mesozoic Solanocrinitidae but also shows a close resemblance with the modern family group Zygometridae.

Based on the near complete fossil of A. zelenskyyi, the species was 2 inches in diameter and had ten foot long large arms and many ring-like appendages near the base to grip the substrate. The arms were used to filter feed food from the water by exposing its arms and letting the food move to it. Ausichicrinites zelenskyyi also may have been able to shed its arms similar to lizards.
