= Geology of Sudan =

Rift basins of southern and eastern Sudan

The geology of Sudan formed primarily in the Precambrian, as igneous and metamorphic crystalline basement rock. Ancient terranes and inliers were intruded with granites, granitoids, and volcanic rocks. Units of all types were deformed, reactivated, intruded, and metamorphosed during the Proterozoic Pan-African orogeny. Dramatic sheet flow erosion prevented almost any sedimentary rocks from forming during the Paleozoic and Mesozoic. From the Mesozoic into the Cenozoic, the formation of the Red Sea depression and complex faulting led to massive sediment deposition in some locations and regional volcanism. Sudan has petroleum, chromite, salt, gold, limestone, and other natural resources.

== Stratigraphy, tectonics, and geologic history ==
The oldest rocks in Sudan are igneous and metamorphic inlier areas formed in the Precambrian and reactivated by the Pan-African orogeny. Examples include the Nuba mountains, Darfur block, and the rocks beneath the Nubian and Bayuda deserts. In the two deserts, metasedimentary rocks were intruded by granitoids and turned to migmatite during the Pan-African orogeny. The Red Sea Hills preserve gneiss, metamorphosed to amphibolite grade in the sequence of metamorphic facies and metasediments together with ophiolite assemblages. Fragments of the East Saharan Craton form exotic terranes near Haya, southwest of Port Sudan in the Red Sea Hills. These rock units include quartzite and marble formed between 800 and 900 million years ago as a passive continental margin.

=== Neoproterozoic: Pan-African Orogeny ===
Geologists have interpreted the metasedimentary belts between the East Sahara Craton and the Red Sea fold and thrust belt as a rifting zone, related to the formation of an ocean in the Neoproterozoic.

The Jebel Rahib Belt, situated in the northwest, contains deformed basic and ultrabasic igneous rocks and thick layers of carbonaceous metasediments, formed at the time of the Pan-African orogeny. This time constraint for deformation and low-grade metamorphism comes from granitoids formed after the orogeny, dated to 570 million years ago. Dense, mafic oceanic crust formed in the Jebel Rahib rift as evidenced by an ophiolite assemblage that includes ultramafic rocks, pyroxenite, gabbro, chert and pillow lava. Pan-African age rocks may have formed in the Nubian Shield outside the Red Sea fold and thrust belt.

The North Kordofan Belt is very similar to the Jebel Rahib rift and likely formed around the same time, although it lacks ophiolites. The belt contains tourmaline-bearing granites and granitoids, dated to 590 million years ago. Shear zones formed at the end of the orogeny were sealed with mica pegmatite by 560 million years ago. Similarly, intrusive granitoids in the Darfur Belt formed between 590 and 570 million years ago.

The low-grade volcanic and sedimentary rocks of the Nuba Mountains also include dismembered, remnant ophiolites, basic and acid plutons, metamorphosed 700 million years ago and affected by igneous activity 550 million years ago, after the orogeny ended. The eastern Nuba Mountains is younger Pan-African age crust, likely a klippe or a small ocean basin.

A strip of tonalite, granodiorite and peralkaline granites, formed from low-grade metasediments, metavolcanics, and granitoids at the time of the Pan-African orogeny occur along the eastern bank of the Nile River. These rocks were intruded by granitoids twice, once 898 and again 678 million years ago, between the Nile and Red Sea Hills, another area of metasedimentary rocks outcrops, including marbles intercalated with metaquartzite.

=== Paleozoic-Mesozoic (539-66 million years ago) ===
Sudan experienced extensive pediplanation, a form of sheet flow erosion that scours away overlying sediments, leaving a gently inclined bedrock surface. Because of this, the country has hardly any unmetamorphosed rocks from the Paleozoic or early Mesozoic, with the exception of a few 530 million year old Early Cambrian rocks at Sabaloka.

Structural geologists believe that the Red Sea depression is not bounded by faults; rather, it formed beginning in the Carboniferous as a subsidence zone and continued to develop in the Mesozoic as a depression between monocline flexures approximately marking the present African and Arabian coasts of the sea.

=== Cenozoic (66 million years ago-present) ===
Rift-related faulting in the Oligocene through the Miocene in the Sudan monocline zone led to the deposition of 4.3 kilometers of sediment in the vicinity of what is now the Suakin Archipelago, filling the trough. By the Miocene, the region was an area of shallow lagoons, in which evaporites deposited.

A renewed period of intense faulting in the Pliocene and early Pleistocene formed a central trough and led to basic and ultrabasic volcanic dikes intruding the Red Sea area. The region stabilized by the Pleistocene, after the connection with the Mediterranean closed in the Pliocene.

== Hydrogeology ==
The 60- to 80-meter-thick Quaternary Gezira, Atshan, and Gash Formations are unconfined and unconsolidated aquifers, composed of alluvial sand, silt, clay, and gravel with high-quality water. The Gezira and Atshan aquifers are recharged by water leakage from the Blue and White Nile, while the Gezira is recharged from the Gezira River. The Um Ruwaba Formation, by contrast, is also unconsolidated and sometimes several hundred meters thick, but recharges very slowly from rainwater, limiting its use to domestic production and livestock watering.

Fractured and weathered zones with Gedaref basalts and Jebel Mara volcanic rocks have fresh groundwater close to the surface and brine deeper in the aquifers. Paleozoic sedimentary rocks in western Sudan and Red Sea littoral sediments exhibit a mix of intergranular and fracture flow. The Nubian Sandstone Aquifer and Gedaref Sandstone have significant intergranular flow and storage and range between 40 and 400 meters thick. Water from these formations is typically fresh, although high salinity affects some water at greater depths. A similar fresh-to-brackish range is seen in the 5- to 20-meter-thick weathered zone—and fractures—associated with Precambrian basement rock.

== Natural resource geology ==
Sudan has extensive natural resources, even after the independence of South Sudan in 2011 reduced the oil reserves within its borders. Natural gas is found offshore of Port Sudan in the Red Sea, and many mineral reserves are situated in the eastern highlands. Sudan has chromite, gold, gypsum, limestone, and salt, although the combined production of chromite, salt, and gold accounts for only one percent of the value of exports.
