= Umm Badr =

Umm Badr أم بادر
- Town
- location in Sudan
- Coordinates: 14°13′N 27°56′E
- Country: Sudan
- State: North Kurdufan

Government
  - Type: Administrative Unit
- Elevation: 2,270 ft (692 m)

Population
  - Total: 12,000

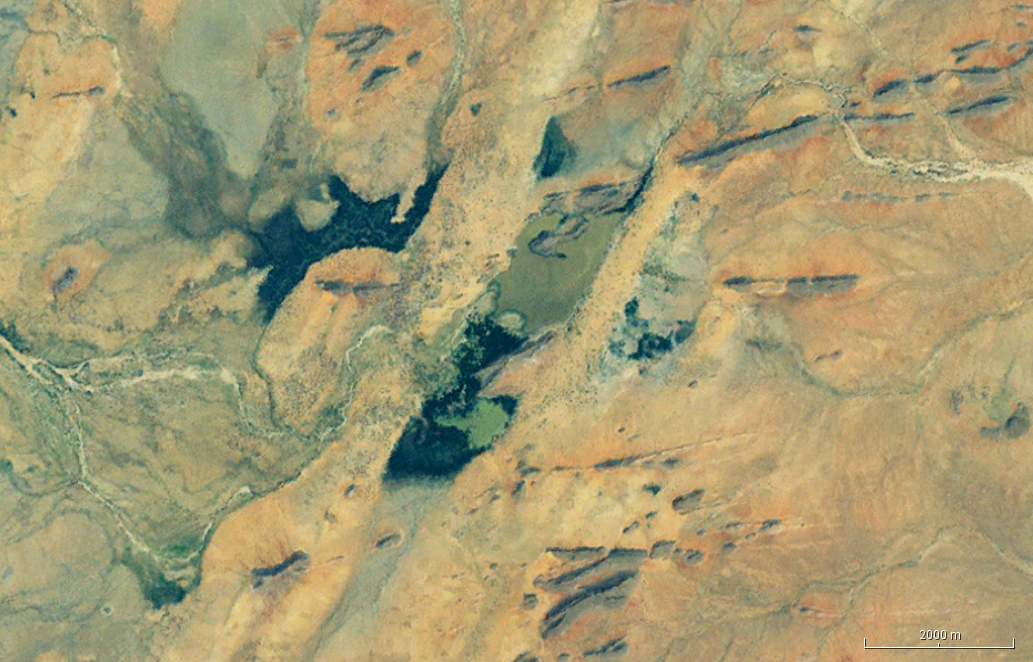

Umm Badr (Arabic: أم بادر) is a town in North Kurdufan in Sudan at an altitude of 691 meters above sea level (2270 feet). It lies at distance of about 319 kilometers (198 miles) west to the capital Khartoum.

Umm Badr is located on the shores of a seasonal lake known as the Lake of Umm Badr or Um Badr lake, midway from Khartoum to El Fasher. The town is a major center for the Kewahla, one of the major tribes in Sudan, and is rich in natural resources and mineral such as gold.

The town is accommodated with one rural hospital. The nearest international airport is in El Obeid city some 237 kilometers (169 miles) away. There is no railway connections to the town, but some roads are to be found which lead to many major neighboring cities such as Al Nuhud, Hamrat El Sheik, Bara and El Obeid.

The topography of the area is dominated by seasonal wadis and small scattered high rocky mountains, hills and dunes of red sands as well as seasonal vegetation around the wadis during the rainy season and Acacia trees. Recently a dam construction has been built to impound rain water. Lake Umm Badr is the main water surface feature in the area.

The average annual temperature is 25.5 °C and the average total annual precipitation is 165 millimeters.

Dr. Kurt Beck, a German anthropologist and Professor in Bayreuth International School of African Studies, University of Bayreuth, has settled in Umm Badr for a long time. The British explorer and writer Michael Asher, author of A Desert Dies, lived in Umm Badr for some years among the Kewahla Arab nomadic and pastoral tribe who roam the desert and the savanna regions in the area.
