= Wadi Muqaddam =

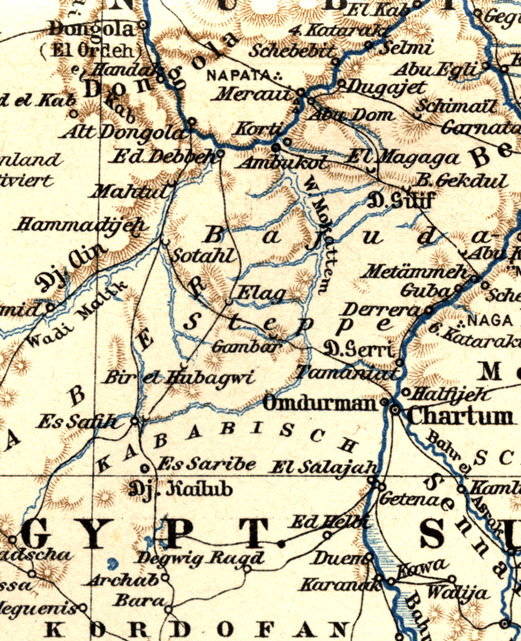
Map from around 1892 with the wadi labelled as W. Mokattem (German)

Wadi Muqaddam is a dry water course some 320 km extending from beyond Omdurman north to the great bend of the Nile near Korti. It gives its name to the geological Wadi Milk Formation. Delimiting the Bayuda Desert to the west, it still flows during rainy seasons. Some scholars assume Wadi Muqaddam as a former channel of the White Nile.

== Archaeology ==
Mesolithic pottery and lithics (stone tools and their manufacturing debris) from the Holocene and the Middle Stone Age have been found in Wadi Muqaddam. In the north of the wadi there is the archaeological site of Al-Meragh.
