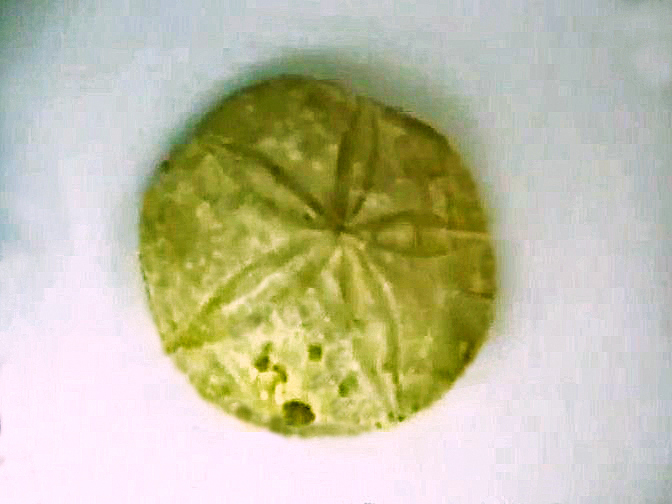
- Fossil of Pygurus tenuis on display at Senckenberg Museum

Scientific classification
- Kingdom: Animalia
- Phylum: Echinodermata
- Class: Echinoidea
- Genus: Pygurus† Agassiz, 1839

Synonyms
- Kieripygurus Vadet, 1997; Pseudopygurus Lambert, 1911; Echinopygus d'Orbigny 1856

= Pygurus =

Pygurus Temporal range: Jurassic – Cretaceous

Genus of sea urchins

Pygurus is an extinct genus of sea urchins.

== Fossil record ==
This genus is known in the fossil record from the Jurassic (Bajocian age) to Cretaceous Santonian age) (age range: from about 164.7 to 94.3 million years ago). Fossils of species within this genus have been found in Egypt, France, Portugal, Saudi Arabia, Switzerland, Ukraine, the United Arab Emirates, Chile, Germany, India, Madagascar, Poland, Saudi Arabia, Tunisia and United States.

== Species ==
Species within this genus include:

- Pygurus andinus Larrain and Biró-Bagóczky 1985
- Pygurus asiaticus Tokunaga 1903
- Pygurus complanatus Tanaka 1965
- Pygurus lampas de la Beche 1833
- Pygurus montmollini Agassiz 1836
- Pygurus noetlingi De Loriol 1899
- Pygurus tenuis Agassiz & Desor, 1847
- Pygurus yamamaensis Kier 1972
