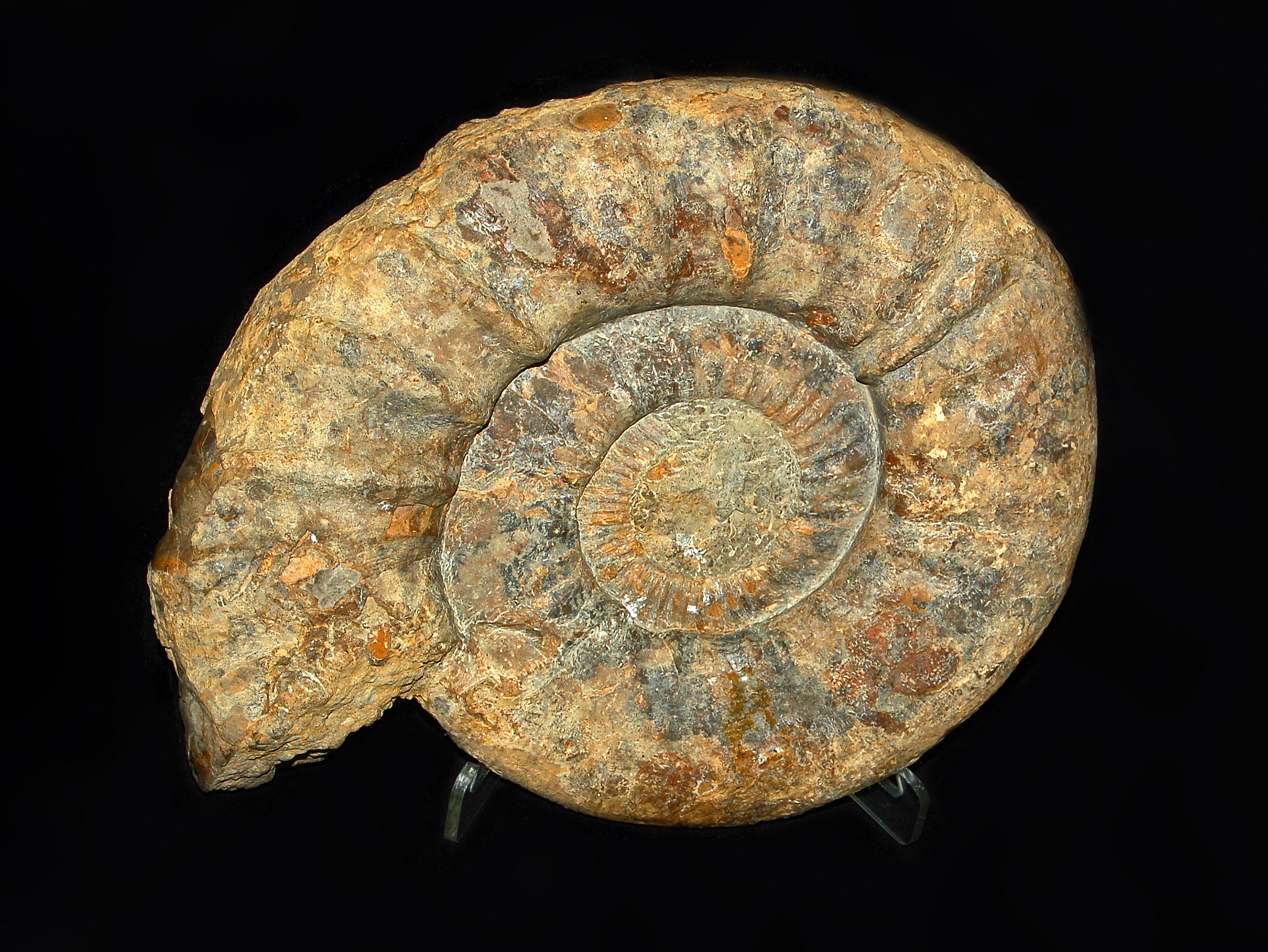
- Orthosphinctes sp., from Montejunto (Portugal), at the Museu Nacional de História Natural, Lisboa

Scientific classification
- Kingdom: Animalia
- Phylum: Mollusca
- Class: Cephalopoda
- Subclass: †Ammonoidea
- Order: †Ammonitida
- Family: †Ataxioceratidae
- Genus: †Orthosphinctes; Schindewolf, 1925

Species
- Orthosphinctes alternans

= Orthosphinctes =

Orthosphinctes Temporal range: Kimmeridgian

Genus of molluscs (fossil)

Orthosphinctes is a genus of ammonites belonging to the order Ammonitida family Ataxioceratidae.

They lived in the late Jurassic period, in the Kimmeridgian age, which occurred 155.7-152.1 million years ago. These shelled ammonoids were nektonic, fast-moving and carnivore.

== Fossils distribution ==
Jurassic of Algeria, France, Germany, India, Iran, Italy, Madagascar, Spain, Yemen.

== Gallery ==
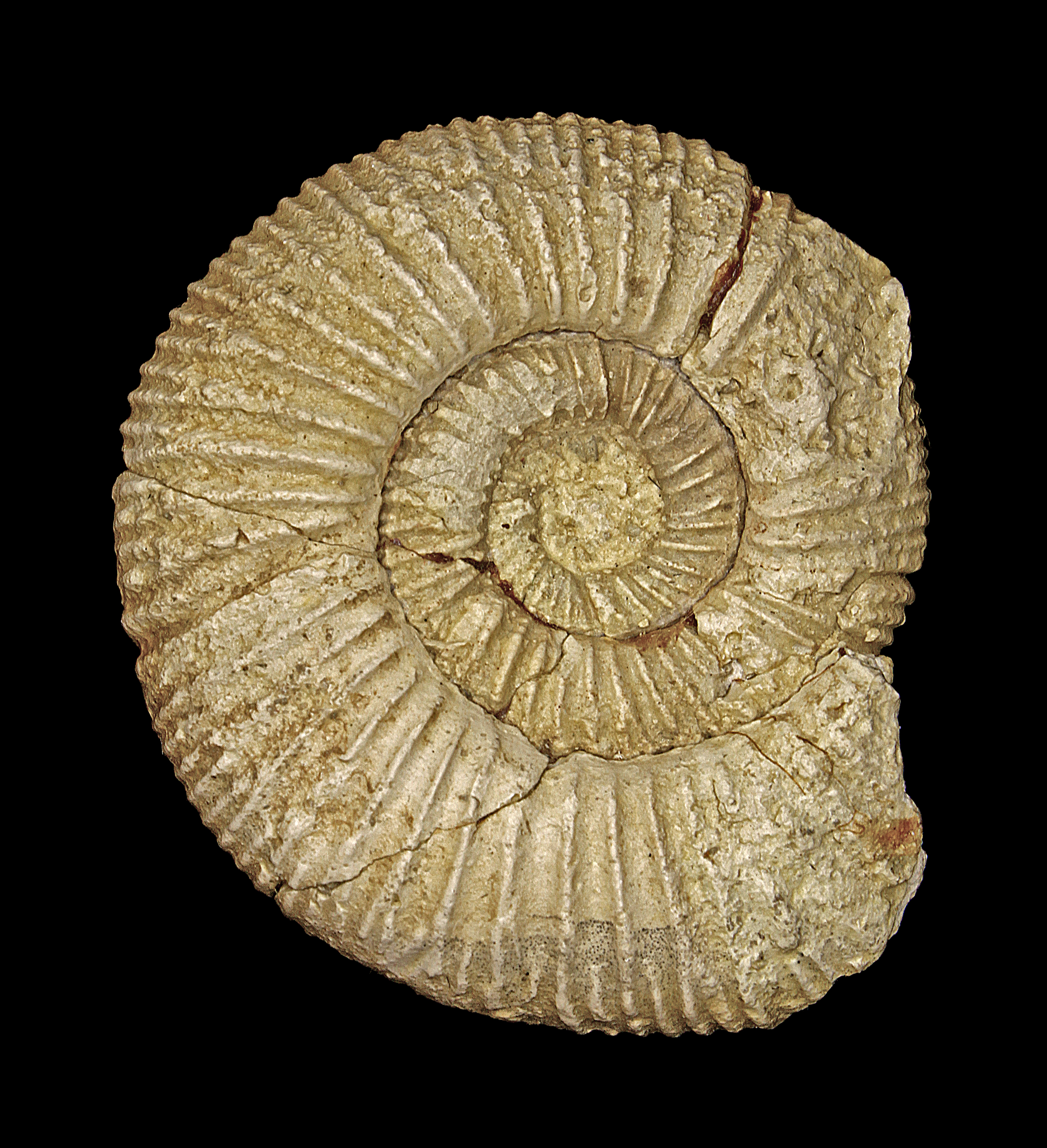
Orthosphinctes colubrinus, from Mount Lochen near Balingen, Germany

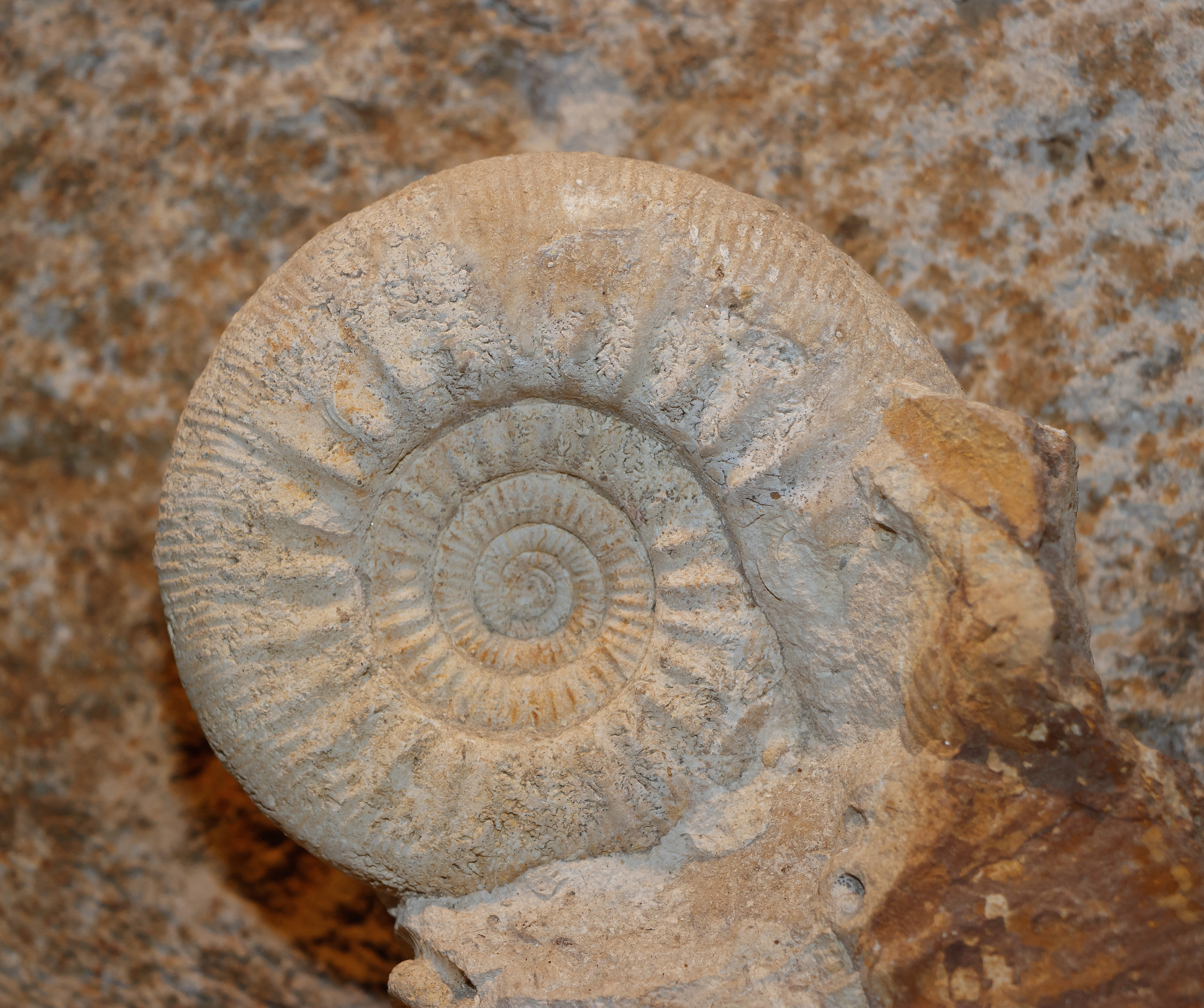
Orthosphinctes pseudoachilles, from Treuchtlingen, Germany
