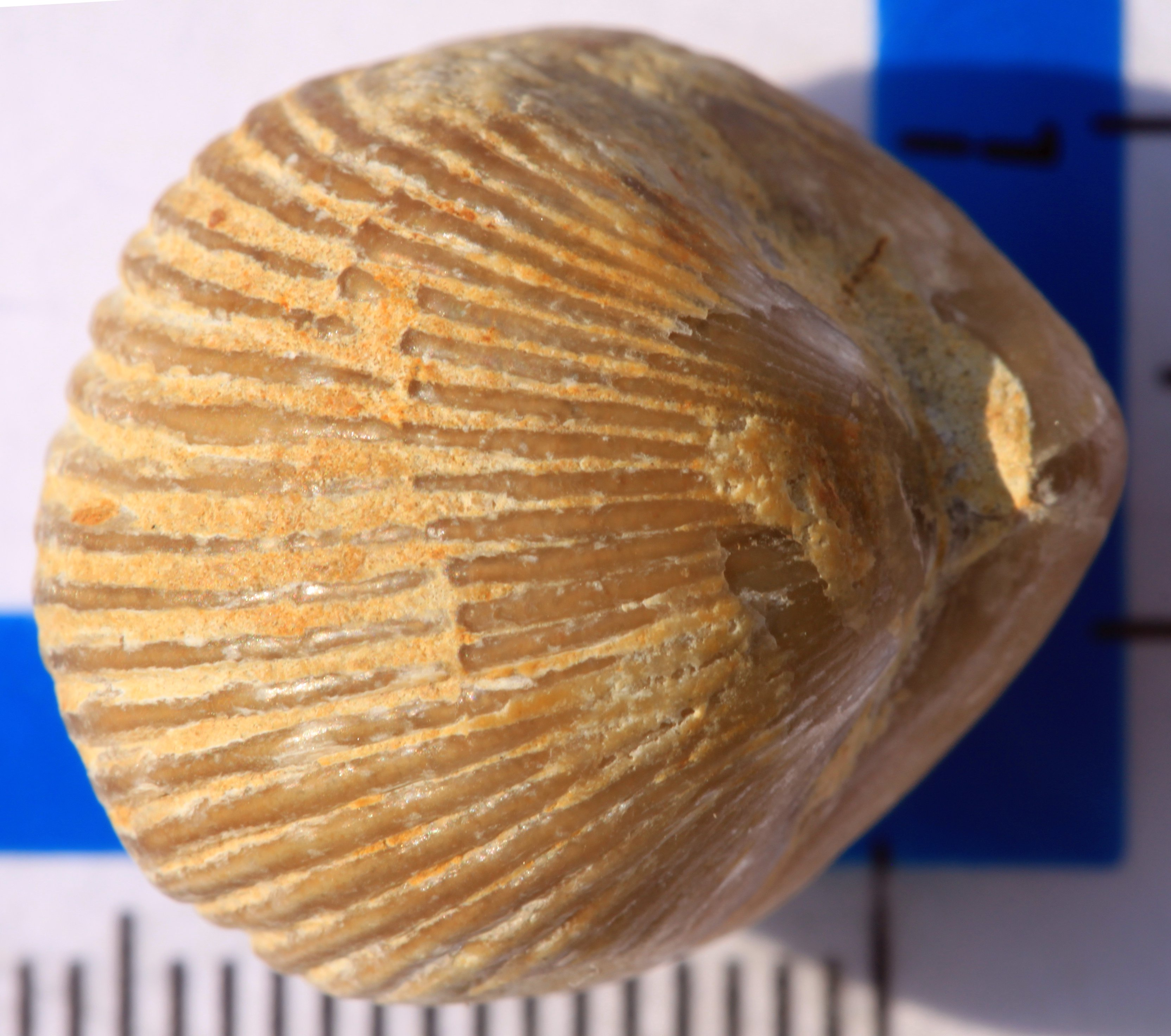
- Somalirhynchia africana brachial valve

Scientific classification
- Kingdom: Animalia
- Phylum: Brachiopoda
- Class: Rhynchonellata
- Order: Rhynchonellida
- Family: †Tetrarhynchiidae
- Genus: †Somalirhynchia; Weir, 1925

Type species
- †Somalirhynchia africana Weir, 1925

= Somalirhynchia =

Somalirhynchia Temporal range: Late Jurassic, 165–155 Ma

Genus of extinct brachiopods

Somalirhynchia is a genus of extinct, medium-sized brachiopod, a marine rhynchonellate lampshell in the family Tetrarhynchiidae. It is roughly the size and shape of a 1-inch (25 mm) toy marble, and has about 29 ribs fanning out from the hinge.

== Distribution ==
Somalirhynchia africana lived during the late Jurassic in the Ethiopian Faunal Province, which consisted of the areas now known as Ethiopia, Somalia, Israel, Jordan, Yemen, Kenya, Madagascar, Saudi Arabia, and Tunisia. It also occurred in India which Kiessling defines as part of the Southwestern Tethys Faunal Province.

Fossils of S. africana are known from the Upper Jurassic of Egypt (Callovian: Jabal al-Magharah/Zohar Formation,), Eritrea, Ethiopia (Callovian: Grande Ilalame; Oxfordian: Mt. Guresu; Early Oxfordian: Mt. Ualinsi; Late Oxfordian: Antalo Limestone; Early Kimmeridgian: Mt. Condudo), India (Callovian: Kachchh), Israel (Middle to Late Callovian: Hamakhtesh Hagadol), Kenya (Oxfordian: Mombasa-Buni, Oxfordian/Kimmeridgian: Baricho), Saudi Arabia (Oxfordian: Shaqra Group/Hanifa Formation, Wadi al Furayshah), Somalia (Callovian: Gerigoan; Callovian/Oxfordian: Daghani, Jirba Range, Madashon, Bihendula, Inda Ad), Tunisia (Callovian/Kimmeridgian: Tazerdunet/Tataouine; Callovian/Oxfordian: Foum Tataouine, Bir Remtha; Middle/Late Callovian: Ksar Beni Soltane), Yemen (Callovian/Oxfordian: Al Ma'abir, Jebel Billum).

== Habitat ==
During the Upper Jurassic, the fossil locations cited were on continental plates, probably in tropical, shallow, coral seas, where this lampshell lived as a stationary epifaunal suspension feeder.

== Description ==
Somalirhynchia africana has medium sized shells subtriangular in outline, strongly dorsibiconvex with maximum width attained past midlength; beak erect and massive with small hypothyroid pedicle foramen; deltidial plates disjunct. Anterior commissure strongly uniplicate; lateral commissure deflected ventrally; interareas large, somewhat concave. Ventral sulcus originates just past midlength, widening anteriorly into a long tongue with six costae. Dorsal valve high, domelike, with strong median fold with seven costae that begins near midlength and becomes strongly elevated anteriorly.
