= Geology of Ethiopia =

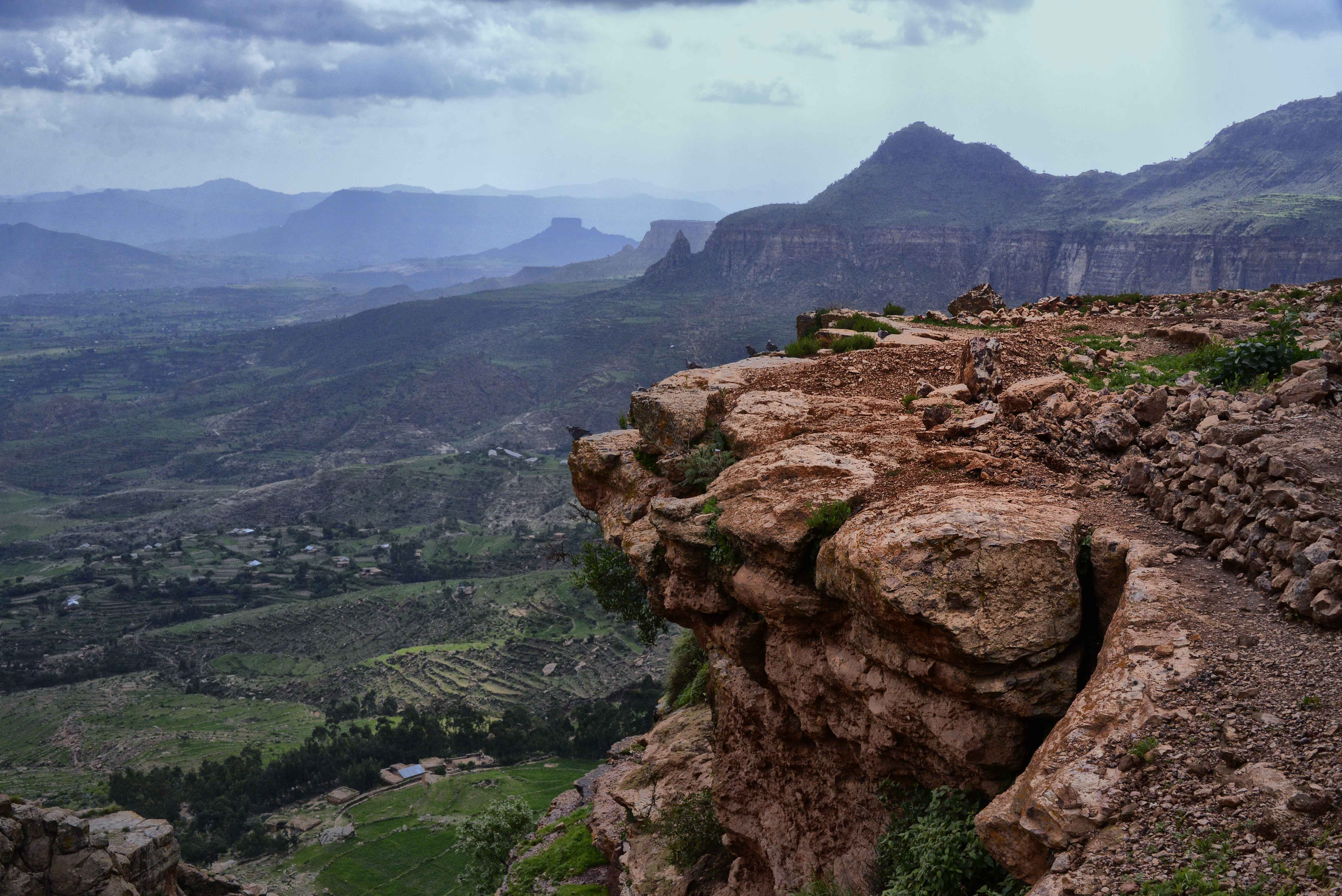
Tigray Escarpment in northern Ethiopia exposing the layers of the Ethiopia-Yemen Continental Flood Basalts.

The geology of Ethiopia includes rocks of the Neoproterozoic East African Orogeny, Jurassic marine sediments and Quaternary rift-related volcanism. Events that greatly shaped Ethiopian geology include the assembly and break-up of Gondwana and the present-day rifting of Africa.

== Overview ==
Rocks formed by the East African Orogeny 880 to 550 million years ago make up the oldest geological units in Ethiopia. The orogeny caused the closure of the ancient Mozambique Ocean. Rocks of Ethiopia formed concurrently with the Mozambique Belt and the Arabian-Nubian Shield forming a large north-south (present-day coordinates) mountain chain called the Transgondwanan Supermountain. Erosion of this mountain may have played a role in triggering the Cambrian explosion. Erosion of the orogen and mountain was such that by the early Paleozoic a planation surface extended across Ethiopia. (Note: Contrary to what has been suggested for much of Africa planation surfaces in Ethiopia do not appear to be pediplains nor etchplains.) Sedimentary rocks of Ordovician age cover this surface making it largely an unconformity. (Note: In other words, this surface was subsequently buried beneath sediments in the Ordovician epoch.) At parts the unconformity of the Precambrian basement has glacial striations, rôche moutonnées and chatter marks formed likely during the Karoo Ice Age. The Paleozoic sedimentary cover above the unconformity is of fluvial and glacial origin (Enticho Sandstone, Edaga Arbi Glacials).

Early Jurassic marine sediments cover much of the older sediments including a planation surface of Triassic age. These sediments deposited as result of a regional marine transgression swept over the Horn of Africa during the initial break-up of Gondwana. Resultant rocks include sandstone, limestone, shale, marls and evaporites (Adigrat Sandstone, Antalo Limestone, Amba Aradam Formation). A third major plantion surface and uniformity formed in the following a tectonic event in the Early Cretaceous that tilted carbonates in the Tigray and Dire Dawa-Harar areas. On top of this surface lies a series a fluvial sediments. Depositions of marine sediments continued in eastern Ethiopia's Ogaden basin until the Eocene.

The Ethiopia-Yemen Continental Flood Basalts or Ethiopian traps that cover much of Ethiopia flowed over both irregular surfaces and peneplains preserving laterite soil beneath. The flood basalts covered initially a much larger area (>750,000 km^{2}) just after eruption about 30 million years ago in the Oligocene with volumes reaching 350,000 km^{3} (Ashangi Basalts, Alaji Basalts). Since then erosion has reduced areal extent and volumes. The modern pattern of volcanism concentrated to the Afar Depression and the Main Ethiopian Rift begun in Late Miocene time. The area of modern volcanism contains the bulk of Ethiopias geothermal energy resources.

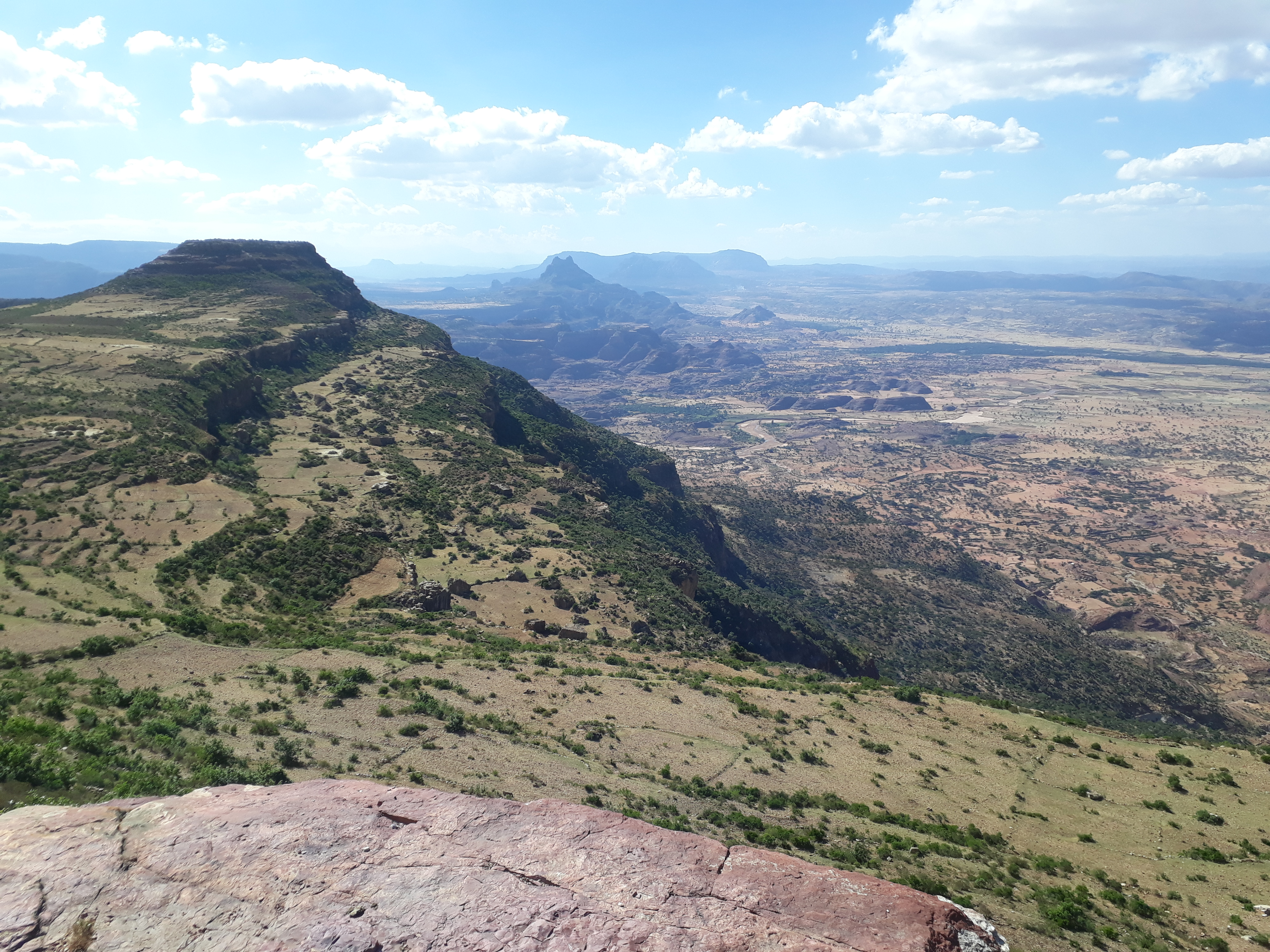
This escarpment between Tsili and Kola Tembien holds most of Ethiopia's sedimentary rock types
