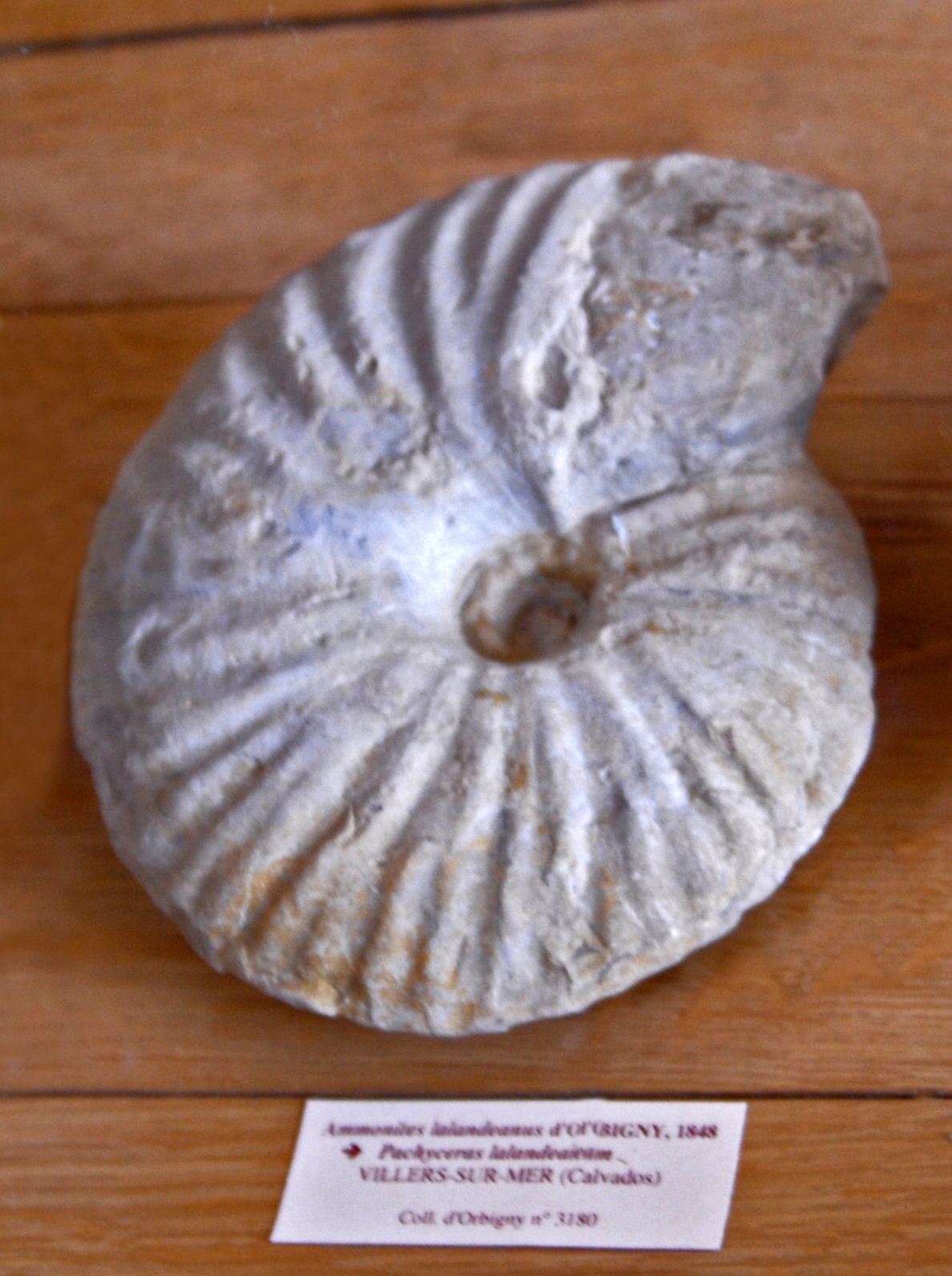
- Fossil of Pachyceras lalandeanum from Calvados (France), on display at Galerie de paléontologie et d'anatomie comparée in Paris

Scientific classification
- Kingdom: Animalia
- Phylum: Mollusca
- Class: Cephalopoda
- Subclass: †Ammonoidea
- Order: †Ammonitida
- Family: †Pachyceratidae
- Genus: †Pachyceras; Bayle, 1878

Species
- Pachyceras schloenbachi Roman, 1930

= Pachyceras =

Pachyceras Temporal range: Callovian–Oxfordian

Genus of molluscs (fossil)

Pachyceras is a genus of perisphinctoid ammonites from the Middle Jurassic, upper Callovian stage, and is the type genus for the family Pachyceratidae. The shell is involute, subglobular, with a deep umbilicus and flattened flanks that slope toward a more narrowly rounded venter, and covered by low, widely spaced ribs.

== Distribution ==
Jurassic deposits of Egypt, France, India, Saudi Arabia and Switzerland.
