= Geology of Djibouti =

The geology of Djibouti consists largely of volcanic rocks from the Miocene to Holocene epochs. There are more recent alluvial deposits with coral on the coast, as well as Cenozoic sedimentary. Amba Aradam Sandstones from the Jurassic Period are found in the southeast of the country.

== Geologic overview ==
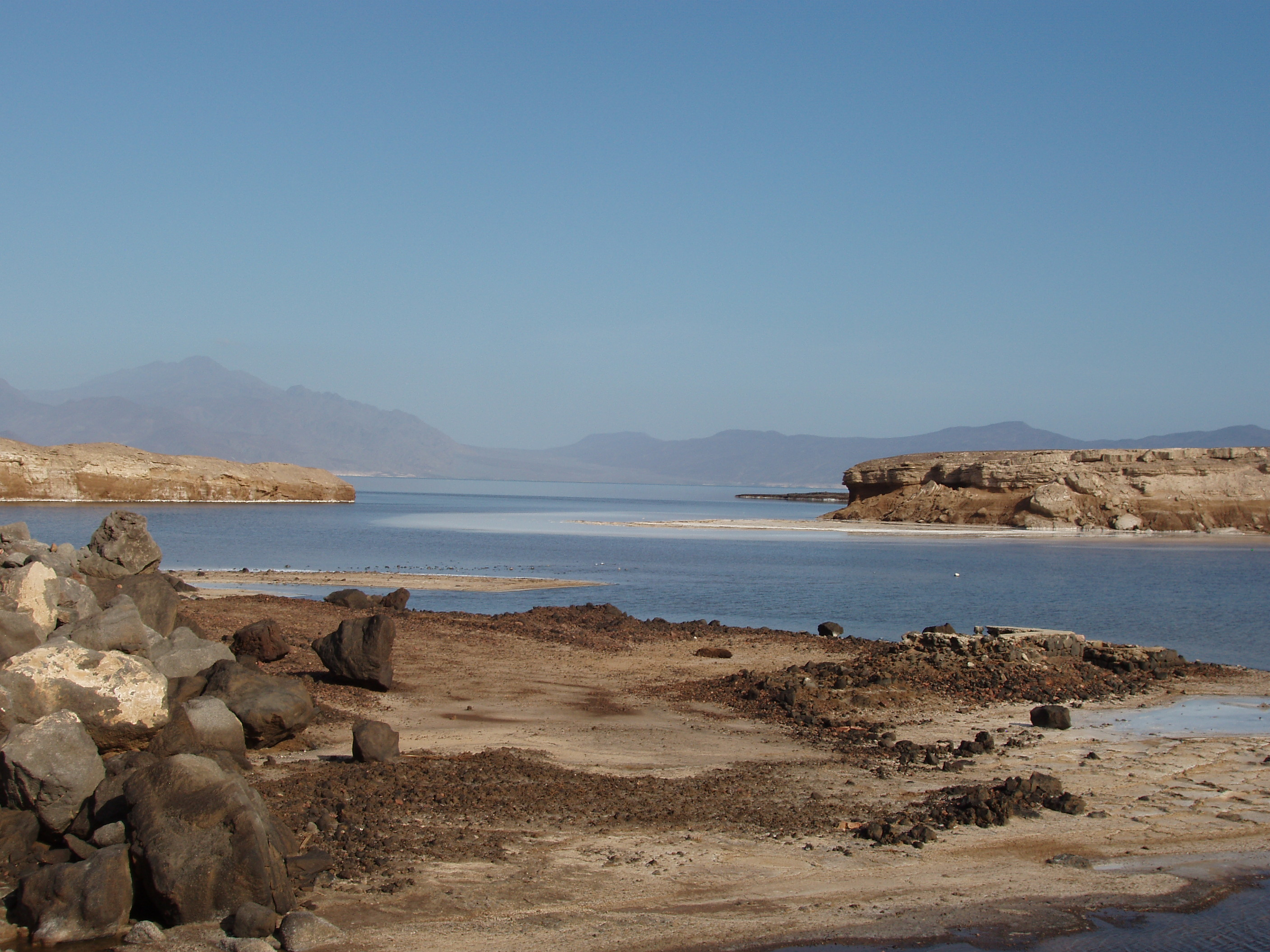
Lake Assal, created by rift generated fragmented relief.

The country was formed by the collision of general tectonic trends of the East African Rift. The rift generated fragmented relief made up of high blocks and subsidence zones, which create geological features such as Lake Assal.

=== Tectonics ===
The Red Sea Gulf of the Aden split open during the Pliocene and early Pleistocene epochs. During these epochs, the Danakil Horst experienced an uplift of its southern prolongation. Analysis of plate tectonics at the triple junction region shows extension rates between 1 mm and 3 mm annually. Earthquake epicenters are focused along the peripheral block faults where the Ethiopian rift touches the Red Sea and Gulf of Aden.

=== Geosites ===
A detailed investigation into the geosites available in Djibouti has not been performed yet, however the triple junction located at the East African Rift System is considered to be of significant geological interest.

=== Geohazards ===
Volcanic eruptions and earthquakes occur at the triple junction at the East African Rift System.

== Economic impact ==
Although Djibouti produces minerals, it is an insignificant portion of its economy. Salt, available due to solar evaporation, is harvested at Lake Assal and helps to make the country Africa’s tenth largest salt producer. Limestone and calcined lime are also currently mined in Djibouti. Additional mining candidates include marble, granite, gypsum, diatomite and perlite.

Petroleum could be extracted in the future; currently exploratory work is being performed.

In addition to mining, the possibility of using geothermal energy is currently being investigated.

== Education ==
Djibouti's new university does have courses available in geology or geosciences.
