= Pachyceratidae =

Pachyceratidae Temporal range: Callovian–Oxfordian

Scientific classification
- Kingdom: Animalia
- Phylum: Mollusca
- Class: Cephalopoda
- Subclass: †Ammonoidea
- Order: †Ammonitida
- Superfamily: †Perisphinctoidea
- Family: †Pachyceratidae; Buckman, 1918

Genera
- See Text

Extinct family of ammonites

Pachyceratidae is a family of Perisphinctoidean ammonites from the upper Middle - and lower Upper Jurassic. Genera within the Pachyceratidae have shells that are in general moderately involte but with most of the inner whorls exposed; whorl sections subquadrate to subtrapezoidal, with rounded venter. Ribbing is strong, in some sharp. Primary ribs typically branch above mid flanks into twos, threes, and even fours.

The Pachyceratidae, according to Donovan et al. (1981), were derived from the Perisphinctidae in the mid Callovian at about the same time as the longer lived Aspidoceratidae, lasting only into the subsequent Oxfordian. This differs from the perspective of Arkell, et al. (1957) in the Treatise wherein the Pachyceridae is included in the Stephanoceratoidea, derived from the Tulitidae and giving rise to the Mayaitidae.

Genera, as described in the Treatise on Invertebrate Paleontology, Part L. (1957):

- Erymnoceras: moderately involute; primary ribs branch into multiple secondaries. (M Callov).
- Erymnocerites, subgen of Erymoceras with more numerous secondary ribs. (M Callov).
- Pachyerymnoceras: involute, last whorl becoming compressed and Pachyceras-like; subgen of Erymnoceras. (U Callov)
- Rollierites: evolute, more or less planulate; ribs coarse, branching from tubercles at umbilical edge. (M Callov).
- Pachyceras: basically involute; umbilical edge rounded, non tuberculate; ribs fade on inner half of whorl sides; last whorl commonly smooth or with ventral folds only. (U Callov - L Oxf).
- Tornquistes: differs from Pachyceras s.s. by coarsening ribs on last whorl and developing eccentric coils; subgenus(?) of Pachyceras. (L- U Oxf).
