= Pharusian Ocean =

Ancient ocean that existed from 800 to 635 million years ago

The Pharusian Ocean (/fəˈruːziən/; fuh-ROO-zee-uhn) is an ancient ocean that existed on Earth from 800 to 635 million years ago, between the break-up of the Rodinia supercontinent and the start of formation of the Pannotia supercontinent.

== Opening and closure ==
The Pharusian Ocean opened around 800 million years ago in the Neoproterozoic era after rifting along the eastern margin of the West African craton during the breakup of Rodinia. The ocean began to close around 730 million years ago with eastward subduction of the Tilemsi arc, which was accreted against the Hoggar region of the Saharan Metacraton. The western part of the Hoggar massif is made of material from the Pharusian Ocean including oceanic basalts, arc volcanic and sedimentary rocks and sediments that were shed into the Pharusian Ocean by the West African craton and the eastern Hoggar. Closure was completed when the West African and Saharan cratons collided around 635 million years ago at the start of the Pan-African orogeny.

== Southern extension ==
The Goiás Ocean, lying to the southwest between the Amazonian craton and the Congo craton, extended into the Pharusian Ocean. The Goiás Ocean closed during the final phases of formation of West Gondwana. The southern portion of the Trans Brazilian Lineament (TBL) marks the suture zone of this closure, while the northern Borborema portion of the TBL and the Trans-Saharan Belt, running from Algeria to Benin, mark the suture zone of the Pharusian Ocean closure. These ocean closures and subsequent tectonic events were not simultaneous, but happened over an extended period of time. In southwestern central Africa the granulite cooling ages range between 587 and 576 Ma, while in northeast Brazil they range from 568 to 500 Ma. However, aeromagnetic and gravity data give evidence of continuity between the TBL lineament, the Sobral fault in northeastern Brazil, the Kandi fault zone in Benin and the Trans-Saharan Belt formed by closure of the Pharusian Ocean.

== Sources ==
- Condie, Kent C. (1992). Proterozoic crustal evolution. Elsevier. ISBN 0-444-88782-2.
- dos Santos, T. J. S.; Fetter, A. H.; Neto, J. A. N. (2008). "Comparisons between the northwestern Borborema Province, NE Brazil, and the southwestern Pharusian Dahomey Belt, SW Central Africa". The Geological Society of London.
- Fairhead, J D; Bournas, Nasreddine; Raddadi, M Chaker (2007). "The Role of Gravity and Aeromagnetic Data in Mapping Mega Gondwana Crustal Lineaments: the Argentina - Brazil – Algeria (ABA) Lineament" (PDF). SEG. Archived from the original (PDF) on 2011-07-11.
- Hatcher, Robert D. (2007). 4-D framework of continental crust. Geological Society of America. ISBN 978-0-8137-1200-0.
- Neves, Benjamim Bley de Brito; Neto, Mário da Costa Campos; Fuck, Reinhardt Adolfo (September 1999). "From Rodinia to Western Gondwana: An approach to the Brasiliano-Pan African Cycle and orogenic collage" (PDF). Episodes. 22 (3): 155–166. doi:10.18814/epiiugs/1999/v22i3/002.
- Pankhurst, Robert J. (2008). West Gondwana: pre-Cenozoic correlations across the South Atlantic Region. Geological Society. ISBN 978-1-86239-247-2.
- Rogers, John James William; Santosh, M. (2004). Continents and supercontinents. Oxford University Press US. ISBN 0-19-516589-6.
