= Geology of Cameroon =

The geology of Cameroon is almost universally Precambrian metamorphic and igneous basement rock, formed in the Archean as part of the Congo Craton and the Central African Mobile Zone and covered in laterite, recent sediments and soils. Some parts of the country have sequences of sedimentary rocks from the Paleozoic, Mesozoic and Cenozoic as well as volcanic rock produced by the 1600 kilometer Cameroon Volcanic Line, which includes the still-active Mount Cameroon. The country is notable for gold, diamonds and some onshore and offshore oil and gas.

== Stratigraphy and geologic history ==
The basement rocks in Cameroon are divided between the Central African Mobile Zone (CAMZ) and the Congo Craton, a section of ancient, stable continental crust.

=== Archean ===
The Congo Craton formed over two billion years ago in the Archean and covers much of southern Cameroon. In the south, it is referred to as the Ntem Group and contains gneiss, granite and charnockite. The CAMZ also dates to the Archean and includes mica schist, migmatite gneiss with plagioclase and migmatites intruded by quartz, granodiorite and diorite.

=== Paleozoic-Mesozoic (539–66 million years ago) ===
The Mangbei Basin, Douala Basin and Rio-del-Rey Basin formed in CAMZ and filled with Early Paleozoic volcanic and sedimentary rocks. The Douala and Rio-del-Rey basins both formed as a result of the breakup of the supercontinent Pangaea and the opening of the Atlantic Ocean.

The conglomerate and sandstone of Mudeck Formation probably formed in the Early Cretaceous and is overlain by fossil-bearing shale. There is an unconformity between the crystalline basement rock and the Mudeck Formation.

=== Cenozoic (66 million years ago – present) ===
During the Cenozoic, Cameroon experienced igneous activity related to the Cameroon Volcanic Line. More than 60 sub-volcanic ring complexes formed, one to 10 kilometers in diameter and made up of syenite and granite. Geologists have dated ring complexes to as far back as 66 million years ago or as recently 30 million years ago and they may represent heavily eroded remnants of earlier volcanoes, that intruded through metamorphic basement rock into early Cenozoic sediments. Known as Granites Ultimes, these ring complexes extend over a span of 1000 kilometers parallel to the Cameroon Volcanic Line, which stretches from the interior of Africa to Pagalu in the Gulf of Guinea.

Mount Cameroon is the southernmost volcano on the continental extent of the line and has erupted within recent years. There are no sedimentary rocks in central Cameroon and they are only present in the north and south. With tectonic activity in the Cenozoic related to the opening of the Atlantic Ocean, the Douala and Rio-del-Rey basins formed a continuous sedimentary basin from Nigeria to southern Cameroon until the Miocene.

Some of the youngest sediments in Cameroon are located in the Lake Chad basin, dating to the past 2.5 million years of the Quaternary. Even more recent Holocene sediments cover much of the landscape, forming soils and alluvial material in rivers.

== Structural geology and tectonics ==
The CAMZ is divided by the Foumban Shear Zone. The Douala Basin is defined by northeast-southwest strike-slip faults and was divided from the Rio-del-Rey basin by volcanic activity. The Cameroon Volcanic Line formed along the preexisting Central African Shear Zone, which cuts through the Adamawa Uplift. The Benue Trough is a major tectonic feature in the north of Cameroon.

== Hydrogeology ==
Virtually all groundwater in much of Cameroon is sourced from a combination of thin layers of unconsolidated alluvium, laterite soils and underlying fractured Precambrian crystalline basement rock, between eight and 20 meters thick. Small springs, including some thermal springs are found in the fractured bedrock around volcanoes.

Cenozoic sediments from the Pliocene and the Quaternary form a key aquifer in the Douala Basin. During the dry season, the water table sometimes falls resulting in seawater intrusion. The Garoua Basin and Lake Chad Basin Aquifer are also important water supplies, often with Cretaceous sandstones at the base.

== Natural hazards ==
Mount Cameroon is the only active volcano in the country, but has erupted frequently in recent history, including seven times in the 20th century destroying plantations and parts of the surrounding landscape in 1909, 1922, 1959, 1982, 1999 and 2000. Cameroon has very active and dangerous crater lakes that accumulate and periodically release carbon dioxide causing the mass death during the Lake Nyos disaster in 1986, which killed 1700 people, as well as the deadly 1984 release at Lake Mounoun which killed 37.

== Natural resource geology ==
Artisanal mining has targeted alluvial diamonds in the Series de Carnot, a group of river and lake formations from the Cretaceous along the border with the Central African Republic. Gold is common across the country in crystalline basement rock, particularly in the east.

There is a small cassiterite deposit at Mayo Darle in northwest Cameroon, nickel and cobalt near Lomie and rutile that was mined until 1957 near Yaounde. Cameroon has two large bauxite deposits in Ngaoundal and the Minim-Martap Complex I in the south, along with Fongo-Tongo in the west. Iron ore, with an iron concentration between 30 and 40% are situated near Mbalam in the southwest and at Kribi on the coast. Local cement plants exploit limestone deposits at Figuil and there is some marble close to Bidzar in the north. The Djoungo quarry extracts pozzolana.

Cameroon has small oil and gas reserves, extracted near Victoria on the north coast, as well as offshore on the Mokoko-Abana Oilfield.
