= Tuareg Shield =

West African geological formation

West Africa: Tuareg Shield to the east of the West African craton

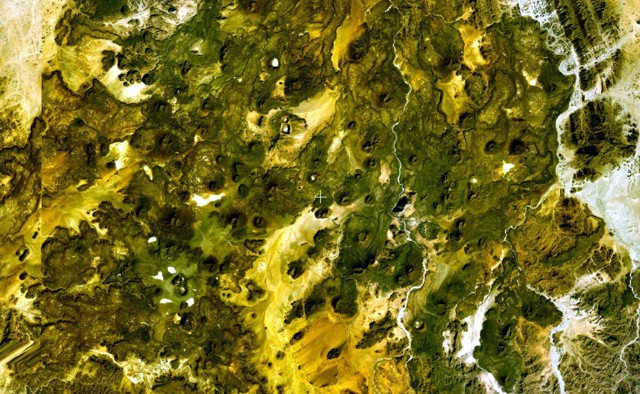
This NASA Landsat image shows small scoria cones and lava flows of the Manzaz volcanic field in the Hoggar volcanic district of Algeria. The volcanic field covers an area of 1500 km^{2}, overlying Precambrian metamorphic and plutonic rocks of the Tuareg shield. Many cones are breached, and the dominantly basaltic and basanitic volcanic products are rich in peridotite and pyroxenite xenoliths and megacrysts. The youngest volcanoes rest on Neolithic terraces and are of Holocene age.

The Tuareg Shield is a geological formation lying between the West African craton and the Saharan Metacraton in West Africa. Named after the Tuareg people, it has complex a geology, reflecting the collision between these cratons and later events. The landmass covers parts of Algeria, Niger and Mali.

== Origins ==
The Tuareg Shield is mainly composed of Archean or Paleoproterozoic terranes and Neoproterozoic terranes that amalgamated during the Pan African orogeny when the West African craton and the Saharan metacraton converged.

The shield originated in oceanic island arcs that formed on the craton during 900 Ma to 680 Ma, of which relics remain as thrust sheets on top of more rigid bodies.

In Mali, the Tilemsi belt is a complex of intraoceanic arcs that formed above a subduction zone sloping down to the east and were accreted to the shield during the Pan-African orogeny. The western part of the Hoggar Mountains (Ahaggar Mountains) is made of material from the Pharusian Ocean.

This comprises oceanic basalts, arc volcanic and sedimentary rocks and sediments, which were shed into the Pharusian Ocean by the West African craton and the eastern Hoggar.

== Fracturing ==
During the oblique collision of the West African craton with the Saharan metacraton the shield was torn into separate but rigid moving blocks. These blocks were separated by subvertical shear zones.

The fractured shield was penetrated by volcanic magmas that formed the Hoggar Mountains in Algeria, Adrar des Ifoghas in Mali and Aïr Mountains in Niger.

The Trans-Saharan orogenic belt which lies along the eastern margin of the West African craton is generally thought to have been caused by the collision between that craton and the Tuareg shield.

== Later events ==
At the start of the Phanerozoic the shield was eroded and covered by Ordovician sandstones. More recently, around 95 Ma - 90 Ma, the area was partly submerged by a seaway linking the Mediterranean and the proto-Atlantic. Since then, starting around 30 Ma the area rose by as much as 3000 meters.

Volcanic activity started around 35 Ma - 30 Ma, and continues sporadically to this day. The higher areas consist of the uplifted Precambrian basement overlaid with volcanic rocks.
