= Crime in Addis Ababa =

Overview criminal activities in Addis Ababa, the capital of Ethiopia

Crime in Addis Ababa, the capital of Ethiopia, is safer in comparison of other African cities. However, there are a number of crimes within the city including theft, scams, mugging, robbery and others. Rural-urban migration and unemployment has been preliminary factors affecting the city by elevating crime rate.

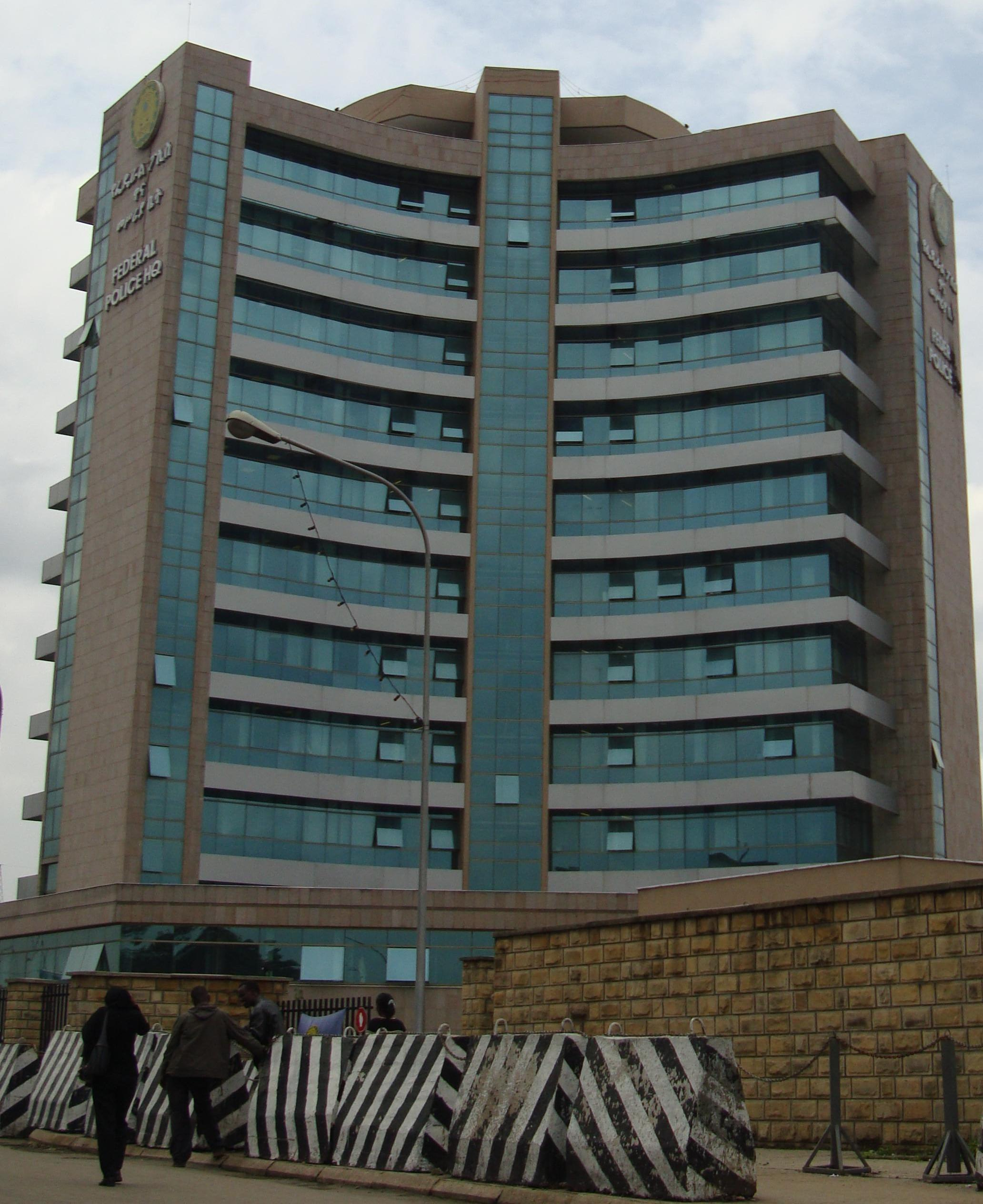
Headquarter of the Ethiopian Federal Police in Addis Ababa

Snatch theft such mobile purse snatching is common. According to Central Statistical Authority 2015 census, the total unemployment rate in Addis Ababa was 21.2% of which male accounting for 14.4% and females 28.6%.

== Overview ==
Criminal activities in Addis Ababa is safer than to most African cities. However, there was report of some minor crimes in the city. Scams, petty theft and mugging are the commonplace and there is smaller number of incidents such as sexual harassment of women and robbery. Criminal gangs are known to use distraction technique including begging or feigning illness. In addition, robberies are increasing in public site of Addis Ababa and especially prevalent at nighttime.

=== Types of crime ===
Socioeconomic factors can influence people's lives and their behavior and subsequent youth unemployment leads to crime in Addis Ababa, with particular reference to Addis Ketema sub-city woreda 8. According to the Ethiopian Federal Police Commission 2016 report, Addis Ababa is the second city in the Oromia Region in terms of frequency of criminal activity annually. In the same year, the Addis Ababa Police Commission reported that 47,890 crimes were registered ranges from property crimes of theft, snatch theft, robbery, fraud, and breach of trust were frequent crimes.

Thus, the crime rate in Addis Ababa is fluctuating year by year; accordingly, about 69,301 crimes were happened in the year 2013, 56,242 in 2015 while 64,437 in 2017.

Overall Crime Trends and Prevalence in Addis Ababa (2013–2017)
Year	Sex	Crime rate in number	Aggregate
2013	Male	62,256	69,301
2013	Female	7,045	69,301
2014	Male	57,572	64,092
2014	Female	6,520	64,092
2015	Male	50,177	56,242
2015	Female	6,065	56,242
2016	Male	52,890	59,372
2016	Female	6,482	59,372
2017	Male	57,751	64,437
2017	Female	6,686	64,437

Since 2013, the crime activity in Addis Ababa is increasing alarmingly daily. Mobile purse snatching, robbery, theft, mugging are some types of property crime which have been committing throughout Addis Ababa. Snatch theft using motorcycle happens rapidly where criminals usually grabs bags and other items of the victims in fast-paced duration and without forethought of the victims.

=== Unemployment ===
On other hands, unemployment is one of the larger problems in the city. Besides rural-urban, migration is also a basis factor to induce crime in Addis Ababa, especially without governmental policy. 2015 data showed that the percentage of unemployed person in Addis Ababa increased significantly with the urban average of 16.8%. Addis Ababa's total unemployment rate is 21.2% of which male accounting for 14.4% and females 28.6% according to Central Statistical Authority in 2015.

In 2018, 264,580 or 20% of unemployed population found in Addis Ababa (CSA 2019).

Total unemployed population and total unemployment rate of Addis Ababa aged 10- years and above by sex 2018
City	Economically active population			Unemployed population			Unemployed rate		
Addis Ababa	Total	Male	Female	Total	Male	Female	Total	Male	Female
Addis Ababa	2,016,568	1,009,200	1,007,368	406,628	42,048	264,580	20.2%	14.1%	26.3%

== Terrorism reports ==
In May 2022, the Ethiopian government said 349 people were arrested in Addis Ababa ranging from planning terrorism to inciting violence.
