= Blue Nile rift =

Rifts in Sudan and Kenya

The Blue Nile rift is a major geological structure in the Sudan, a rift with a NW trend that terminates on the Central African Shear Zone. It was formed through crustal extension during the break-up of Gondwana.

The rift, and other rifts in the area such as the Bahr El Arab rift and White Nile rift, appears to have been activated several times since the Paleozoic era, which ended about 250 Ma. (Note: Ma = Million years ago) During periods of rapid uplift and subsidence, the rifts accumulated sediments of different ages, origins and methods of deposition. Late Jurassic rifting occurred in the Blue Nile rift, with east-west half-graben extension connected by large-scale shear zones and pull-apart basins, and early Cretaceous rifting re-activated the Jurassic basin.

The Blue Nile Basin in Ethiopia may be a southeastern extension of the rift. Further to the southeast, the late Palaeozoic-Mesozoic Ogaden Rift is aligned with the Blue Nile rift.
