= Demographics of Addis Ababa =

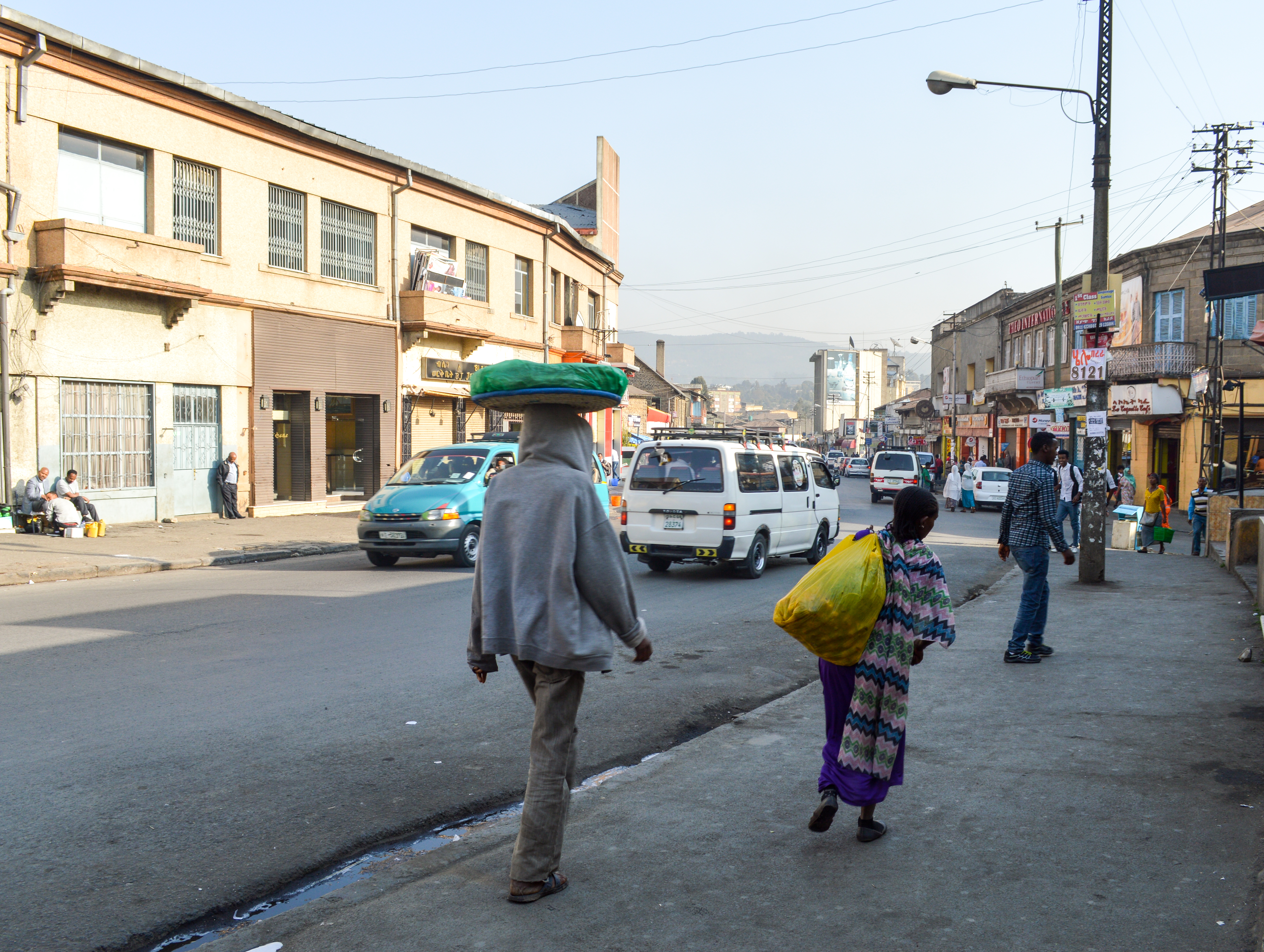
Central Addis Ababa in 2016

Addis Ababa’s population grew from 15,000 in 1888 to 3.6 million in 2023. Among the largest ethnic groups, Amhara: 47%, Oromo: 19.5%, Gurage: 16.3% and Tigrayan: 6.2%. In 1950, the population of Addis Ababa was 392,000. Nowadays, rural flight has been major factor of Addis Ababa population growth; between 1967 and 1975, rural migration was at its peak. In July 2004, the population was 2.8 million. Records of its population vary, with majority authorized record of population estimated no less than 3.5 million. According to Central Statistical Agency projection in 2007, Addis Ababa population was 2.7 million.

== Timeline of population growth ==
Year	Population
1888	15,000
1930s–1940s	80,000
1994	2.11 million
2010	3.3 million
2020	3.6 million
2024	5,704,000

== Education ==
As of 2011, Addis Ababa literacy rate has been improved to 93.8%, followed by Dire Dawa and Harar. About 20–22% of 15–24 year old completed secondary education compared to 4–9% in other cities other than Harar and Dire Dawa. The Addis Ababa University has 48,673 students and 6,043 staff.
