= White Nile rift =

Central Sudan rift

- Rift basin/graben system
- Location: Sudan
- Age: Cretaceous–Tertiary
- Geology: Sedimentary and Igneous Rock

Rifts in Sudan and Kenya

The White Nile rift is one of several rifts in central Sudan running in a NW direction and terminating in the Central African Shear Zone. The rift is a Cretaceous/Tertiary structure that has similar tectonic characteristics to the Southern Sudan Rift, Blue Nile rift and Atbara rift. These rifts follow similar trends, and terminate in a line at their northwestern ends. Probably this line is an extension of the Central African Shear Zone through the Sudan.

The rift basin is formed by the junction of the Umm Rubaba grabens, which extends in a NW direction, and the White Nile graben, which extends in a N to NW direction. The basin is filled with sediments and igneous rocks, and is a target for oil and gas exploration. The rift basins appear to be hydrologically closed, with no lateral transfer of water. One theory is that the current White Nile may have developed no more than 12,500 years ago when the basins filled and the rivers became connected.
