= Córdoba Fault =

Geological fault in Argentina

Córdoba Fault (Spanish: Falla de Córdoba) is a geological fault in central Argentina. The fault is dextral and makes up the boundary between the rocks of the Pampean Orogen and Río de la Plata Craton. It is considered by scientists an extension of the Trans Brazilian Lineament.
