= Geography of Cameroon =

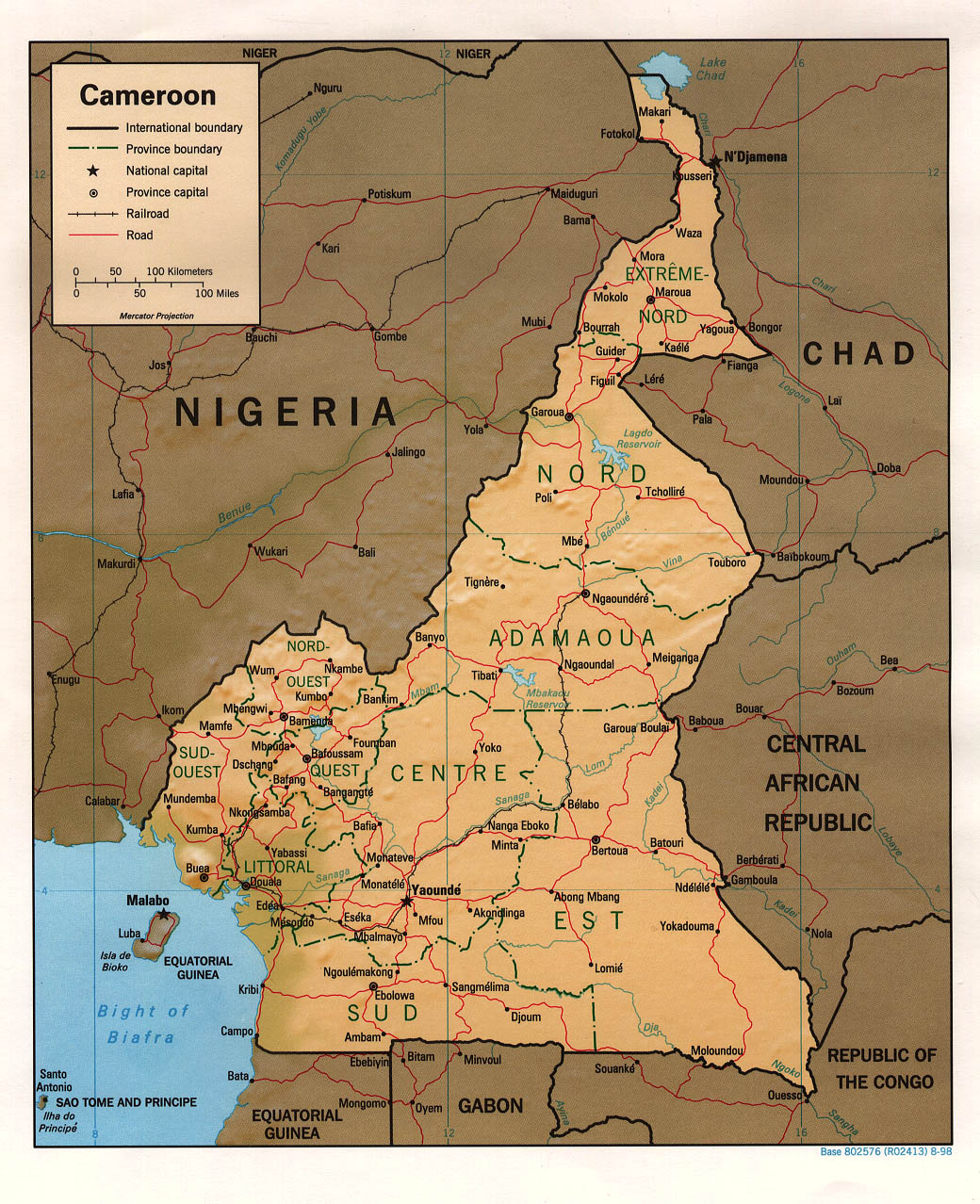
Map of Cameroon

Location of Cameroon

At 475,440 km^{2} (183,570 sq mi), Cameroon is the world's 53rd largest country. It is slightly larger than the nation of Sweden and the US state of California. It is comparable in size to Papua New Guinea. Cameroon's landmass is 472,710 km^{2} (182,510 sq mi), with 2,730 km^{2} (1,050 sq mi) of water.

The country is located in Central and West Africa, bordering the Bight of Biafra, between Equatorial Guinea and Nigeria.

Cameroon is sometimes described as "Africa in miniature" because it exhibits all the major climates and vegetation of the continent: mountains, desert, rain forest, savanna grassland, and ocean coastland. Cameroon can be divided into five geographic zones. These are distinguished by dominant physical, climatic, and vegetative features.

== Natural regions ==
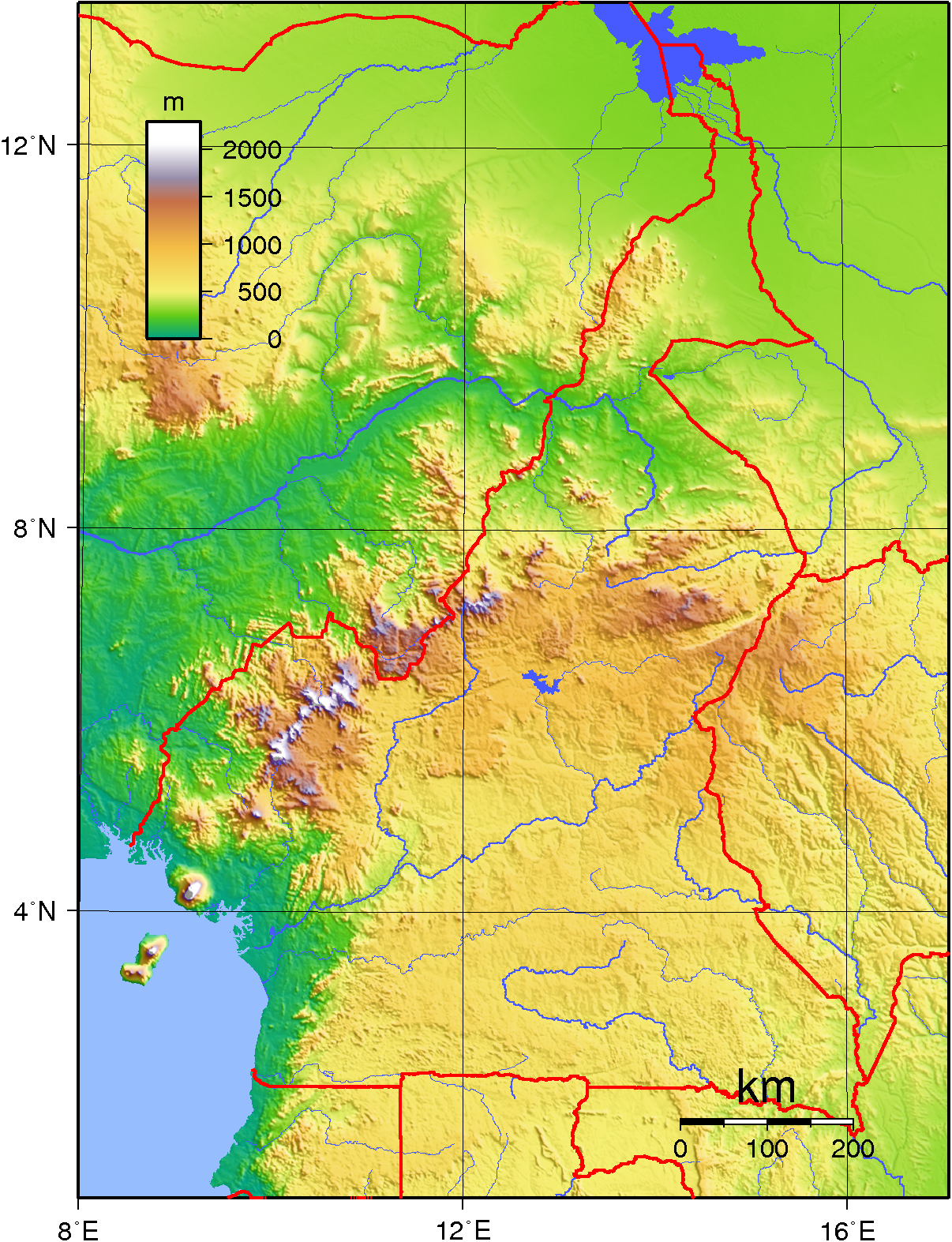
Topography of Cameroon

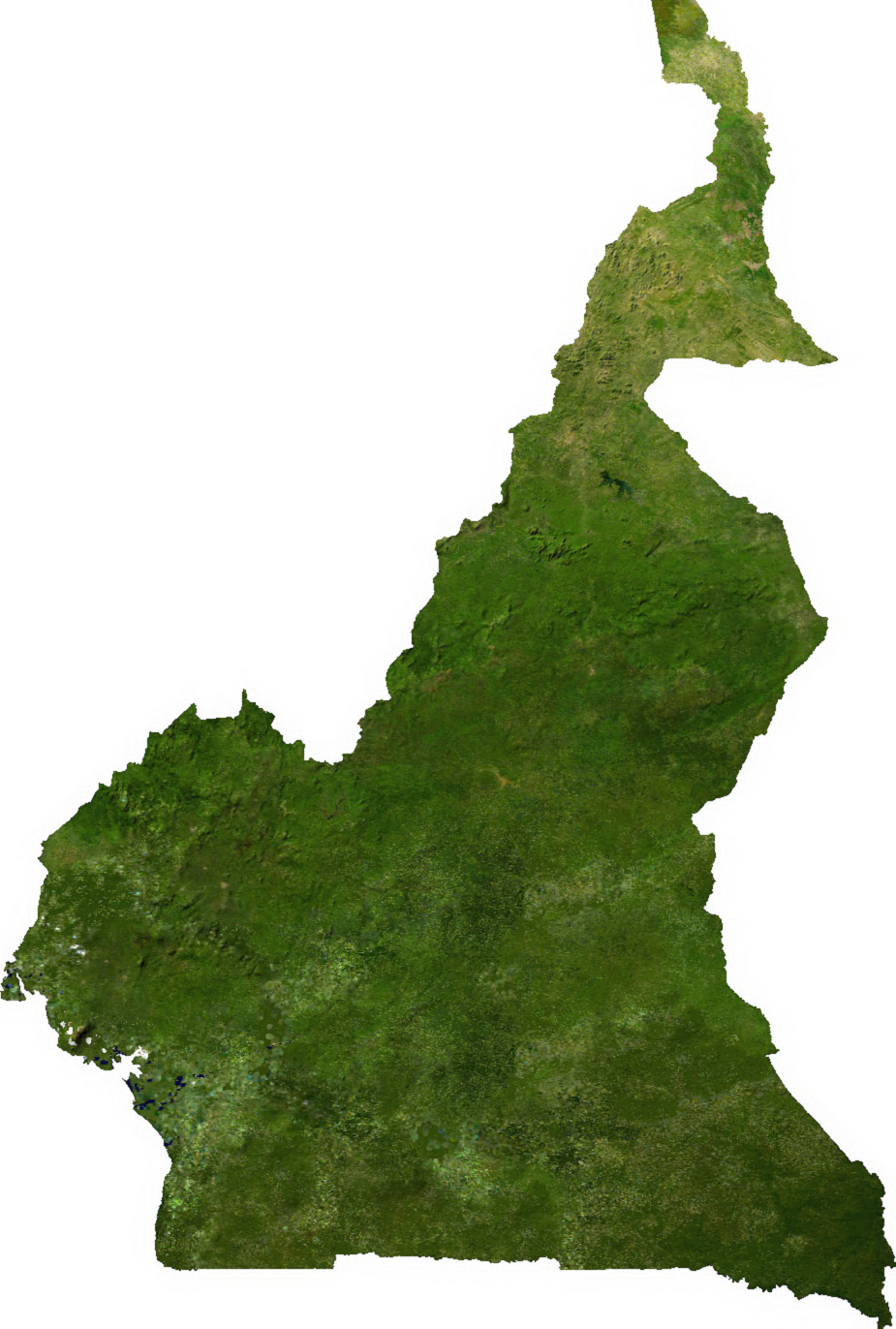
Satellite image of Cameroon

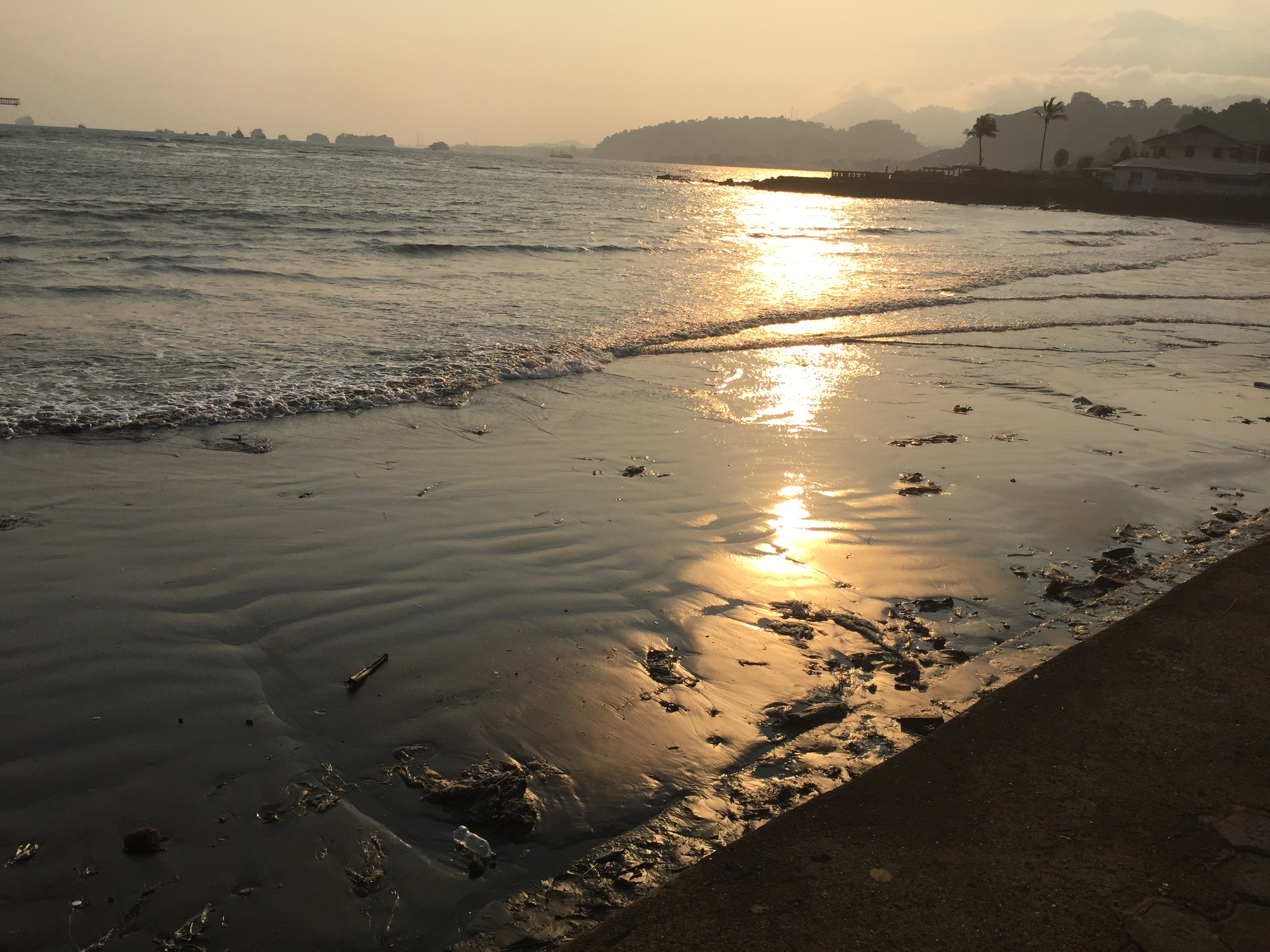
Night view of Limbe Atlantic Ocean

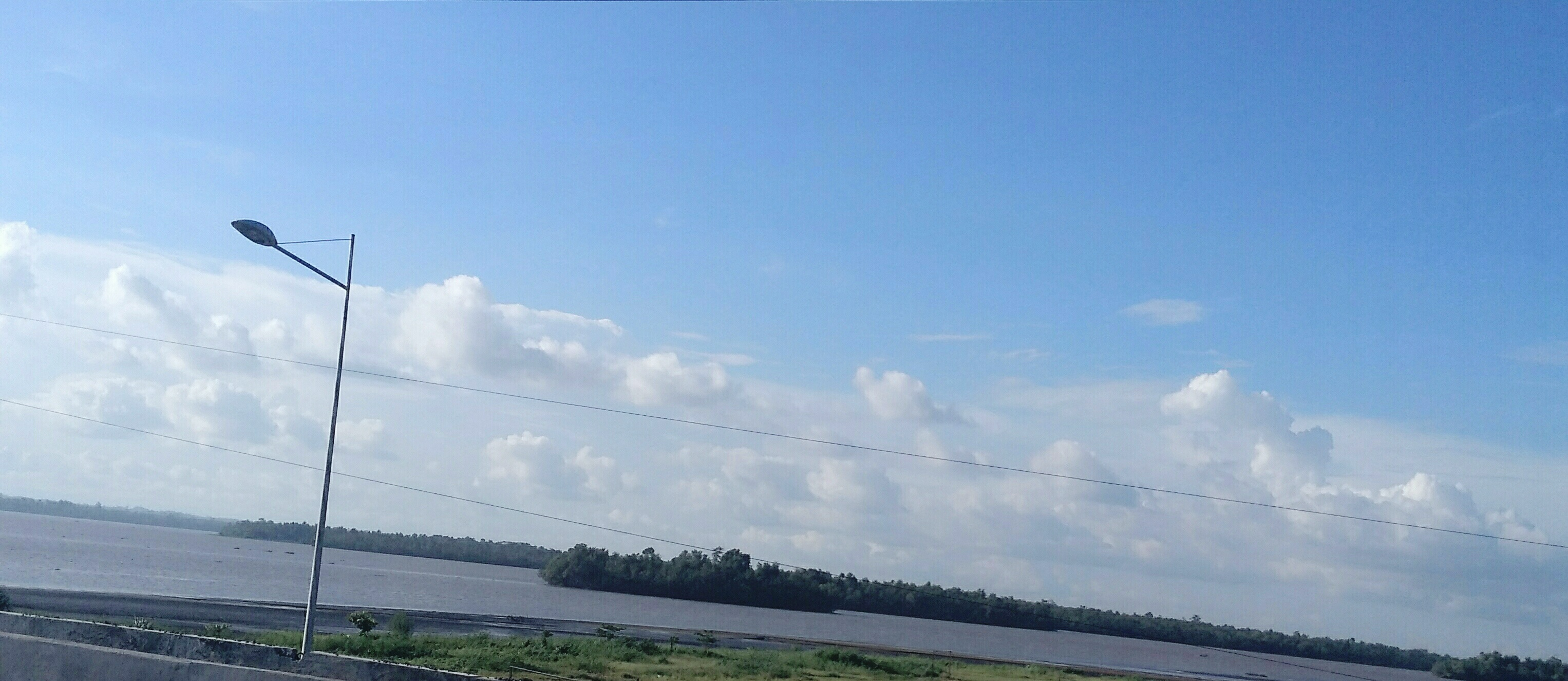
Mangroves along the banks of Wouri River in Douala

Cameroon is one of the wettest parts of Africa and records Africa's second highest concentration of biodiversity. In Cameroon forest cover is around 43% of the total land area, equivalent to 20,340,480 hectares (50,262,400 acres) of forest in 2020, down from 22,500,000 hectares (56,000,000 acres) in 1990. In 2020, naturally regenerating forest covered 20,279,380 hectares (50,111,400 acres) and planted forest covered 61,100 hectares (151,000 acres). Around 15% of the forest area was found within protected areas, for the year 2015, 100% of the forest area was reported to be under public ownership.

Cameroon's coastal plain extends 20 to 80 kilometres (10 to 50 mi) inland from the Gulf of Guinea (part of the Atlantic Ocean) to the edge of a plateau. In the former western state, however, the mass of Mount Cameroon reaches almost to the sea. The plain is densely forested including areas of Central African mangroves especially around Douala and in the estuary of the Cross River on the border with Nigeria.

A recent global remote sensing analysis suggested that there were 643 km^{2} of tidal flats in Cameroon, making it the 39th ranked country in terms of tidal flat area.

The low South Cameroon Plateau, rising from the coastal plain and dominated by tropical rain forest, has an average elevation of 500 to 600 metres (1,500 to 2,000 ft). It is less humid than the coast.

In western Cameroon is an irregular chain of mountains, hills, and plateaus that extends from Mount Cameroon almost to Lake Chad at the northern tip of the country. This region includes the Bamenda, Bamiléké, and Mambilla highlands. It also contains some of the country's most fertile soils, notably around volcanic Mt. Cameroon. This area of tropical forest has been categorised by the World Wildlife Fund as the Cameroonian Highlands forests ecoregion with Mount Cameroon considered separately because as an active volcano it has a distinct environment from the other mountains.

From the forested southern plateau the land rises northward to the grassy, rugged Adamaoua (Adamawa) highlands. Stretching across Cameroon from the western mountain area, the Adamaoua forms a barrier between the north and south. Its average elevation is 1,000 m (3,400 ft).

The southern savanna plain extends from the edge of the Adamaoua to Lake Chad. Its characteristic vegetation is scrub and grass. This is region of sparse rainfall and high median temperatures has been included as part of the East Sudanian savanna ecoregion.

== Climate ==
The climate varies with terrain, from tropical along the coast to semiarid and hot in the north. Exceedingly hot and humid, the coastal belt includes some of the wettest places on earth. For example, Debundscha, at the base of Mt. Cameroon, has an average annual rainfall of 10,300 millimetres (405 in).

Climate data for Yaoundé
| Month | Jan | Feb | Mar | Apr | May | Jun | Jul | Aug | Sep | Oct | Nov | Dec | Year |
|---|---|---|---|---|---|---|---|---|---|---|---|---|---|
| Record high °C (°F) | 33 (91) | 33 (91) | 33 (91) | 36 (97) | 34 (93) | 32 (90) | 31 (88) | 34 (93) | 31 (88) | 33 (91) | 32 (90) | 32 (90) | 36 (97) |
| Mean daily maximum °C (°F) | 29.6 (85.3) | 31.0 (87.8) | 30.4 (86.7) | 29.6 (85.3) | 28.8 (83.8) | 27.7 (81.9) | 26.5 (79.7) | 26.5 (79.7) | 27.5 (81.5) | 27.8 (82.0) | 28.1 (82.6) | 28.5 (83.3) | 28.5 (83.3) |
| Daily mean °C (°F) | 24.6 (76.3) | 25.7 (78.3) | 25.4 (77.7) | 25.0 (77.0) | 24.5 (76.1) | 23.8 (74.8) | 23.2 (73.8) | 22.9 (73.2) | 23.4 (74.1) | 23.5 (74.3) | 23.9 (75.0) | 24.0 (75.2) | 24.2 (75.6) |
| Mean daily minimum °C (°F) | 19.6 (67.3) | 20.3 (68.5) | 20.3 (68.5) | 20.3 (68.5) | 20.2 (68.4) | 19.9 (67.8) | 19.9 (67.8) | 19.3 (66.7) | 19.3 (66.7) | 19.2 (66.6) | 19.6 (67.3) | 19.5 (67.1) | 19.8 (67.6) |
| Record low °C (°F) | 14 (57) | 15 (59) | 16 (61) | 15 (59) | 16 (61) | 15 (59) | 16 (61) | 16 (61) | 15 (59) | 15 (59) | 17 (63) | 16 (61) | 14 (57) |
| Average precipitation mm (inches) | 19.0 (0.75) | 42.8 (1.69) | 124.9 (4.92) | 171.3 (6.74) | 199.3 (7.85) | 157.1 (6.19) | 74.2 (2.92) | 113.7 (4.48) | 232.3 (9.15) | 293.6 (11.56) | 94.3 (3.71) | 18.6 (0.73) | 1,541.1 (60.69) |
| Average precipitation days (≥ 0.1 mm) | 3 | 4 | 12 | 14 | 17 | 14 | 11 | 12 | 20 | 23 | 11 | 3 | 144 |
| Average relative humidity (%) | 79.5 | 79.5 | 81.0 | 82.0 | 84.0 | 85.0 | 85.5 | 86.0 | 85.5 | 85.0 | 82.0 | 79.0 | 82.8 |
| Mean monthly sunshine hours | 172.0 | 179.0 | 169.9 | 164.5 | 166.2 | 126.0 | 96.1 | 86.2 | 102.4 | 130.2 | 167.1 | 181.4 | 1,741 |
Source 1: World Meteorological Organization NOAA (sun 1961–1990)
Source 2: BBC Weather

Climate data for Douala (1971-2000, extremes 1885-present)
| Month | Jan | Feb | Mar | Apr | May | Jun | Jul | Aug | Sep | Oct | Nov | Dec | Year |
|---|---|---|---|---|---|---|---|---|---|---|---|---|---|
| Record high °C (°F) | 35.8 (96.4) | 39.8 (103.6) | 37.8 (100.0) | 36.4 (97.5) | 36.0 (96.8) | 39.0 (102.2) | 32.5 (90.5) | 32.0 (89.6) | 33.1 (91.6) | 35.0 (95.0) | 38.0 (100.4) | 38.0 (100.4) | 39.8 (103.6) |
| Mean daily maximum °C (°F) | 32.2 (90.0) | 32.8 (91.0) | 32.5 (90.5) | 32.1 (89.8) | 31.4 (88.5) | 29.9 (85.8) | 28.1 (82.6) | 27.7 (81.9) | 29.0 (84.2) | 29.8 (85.6) | 30.9 (87.6) | 31.7 (89.1) | 30.7 (87.3) |
| Daily mean °C (°F) | 27.8 (82.0) | 28.5 (83.3) | 28.2 (82.8) | 27.8 (82.0) | 27.3 (81.1) | 26.5 (79.7) | 25.4 (77.7) | 25.3 (77.5) | 25.9 (78.6) | 26.2 (79.2) | 27.1 (80.8) | 27.5 (81.5) | 27.0 (80.6) |
| Mean daily minimum °C (°F) | 23.4 (74.1) | 24.1 (75.4) | 23.9 (75.0) | 23.5 (74.3) | 23.2 (73.8) | 23.0 (73.4) | 22.7 (72.9) | 22.8 (73.0) | 22.8 (73.0) | 22.5 (72.5) | 23.2 (73.8) | 23.3 (73.9) | 23.2 (73.8) |
| Record low °C (°F) | 18.0 (64.4) | 19.0 (66.2) | 18.0 (64.4) | 18.3 (64.9) | 16.0 (60.8) | 18.2 (64.8) | 18.2 (64.8) | 19.0 (66.2) | 18.5 (65.3) | 16.8 (62.2) | 18.5 (65.3) | 18.0 (64.4) | 16.0 (60.8) |
| Average precipitation mm (inches) | 34.2 (1.35) | 54.5 (2.15) | 155.2 (6.11) | 241.2 (9.50) | 276.2 (10.87) | 354.1 (13.94) | 681.4 (26.83) | 687.5 (27.07) | 561.2 (22.09) | 406.6 (16.01) | 123.1 (4.85) | 27.5 (1.08) | 3,602.7 (141.84) |
| Average precipitation days (≥ 0.1 mm) | 5 | 9 | 15 | 18 | 21 | 23 | 27 | 30 | 26 | 24 | 12 | 5 | 215 |
| Average relative humidity (%) | 80 | 79 | 80 | 81 | 82 | 85 | 87 | 88 | 86 | 84 | 83 | 82 | 83 |
| Mean monthly sunshine hours | 193.3 | 179.1 | 171.9 | 176.5 | 175.8 | 123.1 | 72.0 | 53.2 | 90.8 | 131.2 | 162.1 | 184.2 | 1,713.2 |
Source 1: World Meteorological Organization Meteo Climat (record highs and lows)
Source 2: Deutscher Wetterdienst (humidity, 1957-1990), NOAA (sun, 1961-1990)

Climate data for Garoua
| Month | Jan | Feb | Mar | Apr | May | Jun | Jul | Aug | Sep | Oct | Nov | Dec | Year |
|---|---|---|---|---|---|---|---|---|---|---|---|---|---|
| Mean daily maximum °C (°F) | 34.4 (93.9) | 37.3 (99.1) | 39.8 (103.6) | 39.5 (103.1) | 36.5 (97.7) | 33.2 (91.8) | 31.1 (88.0) | 30.7 (87.3) | 31.5 (88.7) | 34.2 (93.6) | 36.0 (96.8) | 34.8 (94.6) | 34.9 (94.8) |
| Daily mean °C (°F) | 26.0 (78.8) | 28.9 (84.0) | 32.2 (90.0) | 33.0 (91.4) | 30.7 (87.3) | 28.2 (82.8) | 26.6 (79.9) | 26.4 (79.5) | 26.7 (80.1) | 28.1 (82.6) | 27.3 (81.1) | 26.0 (78.8) | 28.3 (82.9) |
| Mean daily minimum °C (°F) | 17.5 (63.5) | 20.5 (68.9) | 24.7 (76.5) | 26.4 (79.5) | 24.9 (76.8) | 23.2 (73.8) | 22.2 (72.0) | 22.0 (71.6) | 21.9 (71.4) | 22.2 (72.0) | 19.2 (66.6) | 17.3 (63.1) | 21.8 (71.2) |
| Average rainfall mm (inches) | 0.0 (0.0) | 0.0 (0.0) | 2.0 (0.08) | 44.1 (1.74) | 108.4 (4.27) | 134.8 (5.31) | 205.3 (8.08) | 247.9 (9.76) | 190.0 (7.48) | 63.3 (2.49) | 1.6 (0.06) | 0.0 (0.0) | 997.4 (39.27) |
| Average rainy days (≥ 1.0 mm) | 0 | 0 | 1 | 5 | 9 | 11 | 14 | 17 | 24 | 6 | 1 | 0 | 88 |
| Mean monthly sunshine hours | 275.0 | 252.6 | 260.1 | 245.4 | 256.7 | 224.4 | 194.0 | 187.2 | 204.5 | 261.5 | 279.2 | 286.5 | 2,927.1 |
Source: NOAA

== Biodiversity ==
The wide diversity of climates and natural regions of Cameroon, as coastline, mountains, savanna, deserts, and tropical forests, allows that the country counts with rich biodiversity. Twenty-two million hectares from the Congo Basin forest ecosystem are located in Cameroon, where 9,000 plant species, 900 bird species, and 320 mammals species live, included 156 endemic plants, eight endemic birds, and 14 endemic mammals. The border with Nigeria has one of the highest concentration of biodiversity in Africa.

As part of the conservation efforts to protect threatened natural resources, Cameroon has established protected areas since 1932, included national parks, wildlife sanctuaries, faunal reserves, and one flora sanctuary.

== Rivers ==
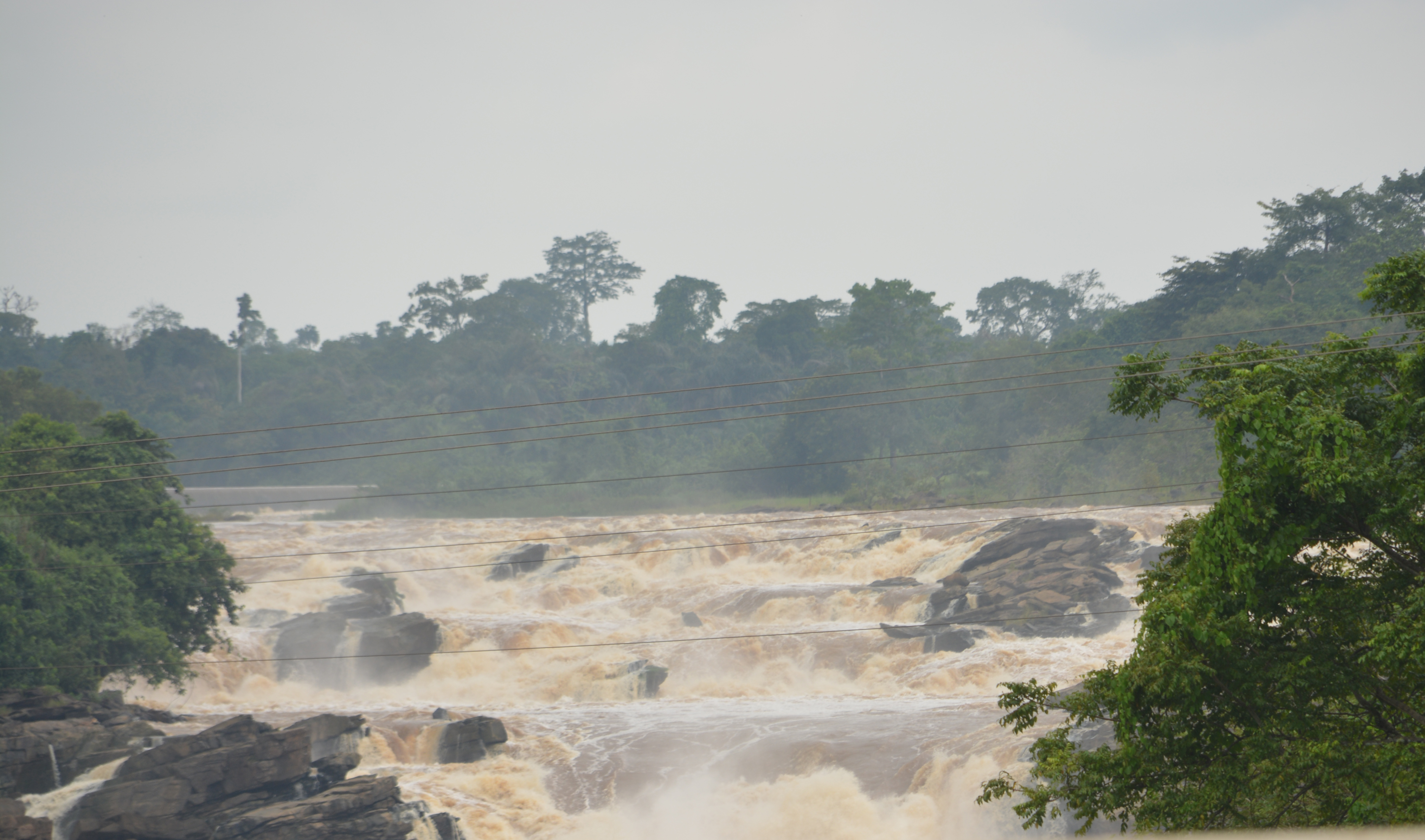
Sanaga River

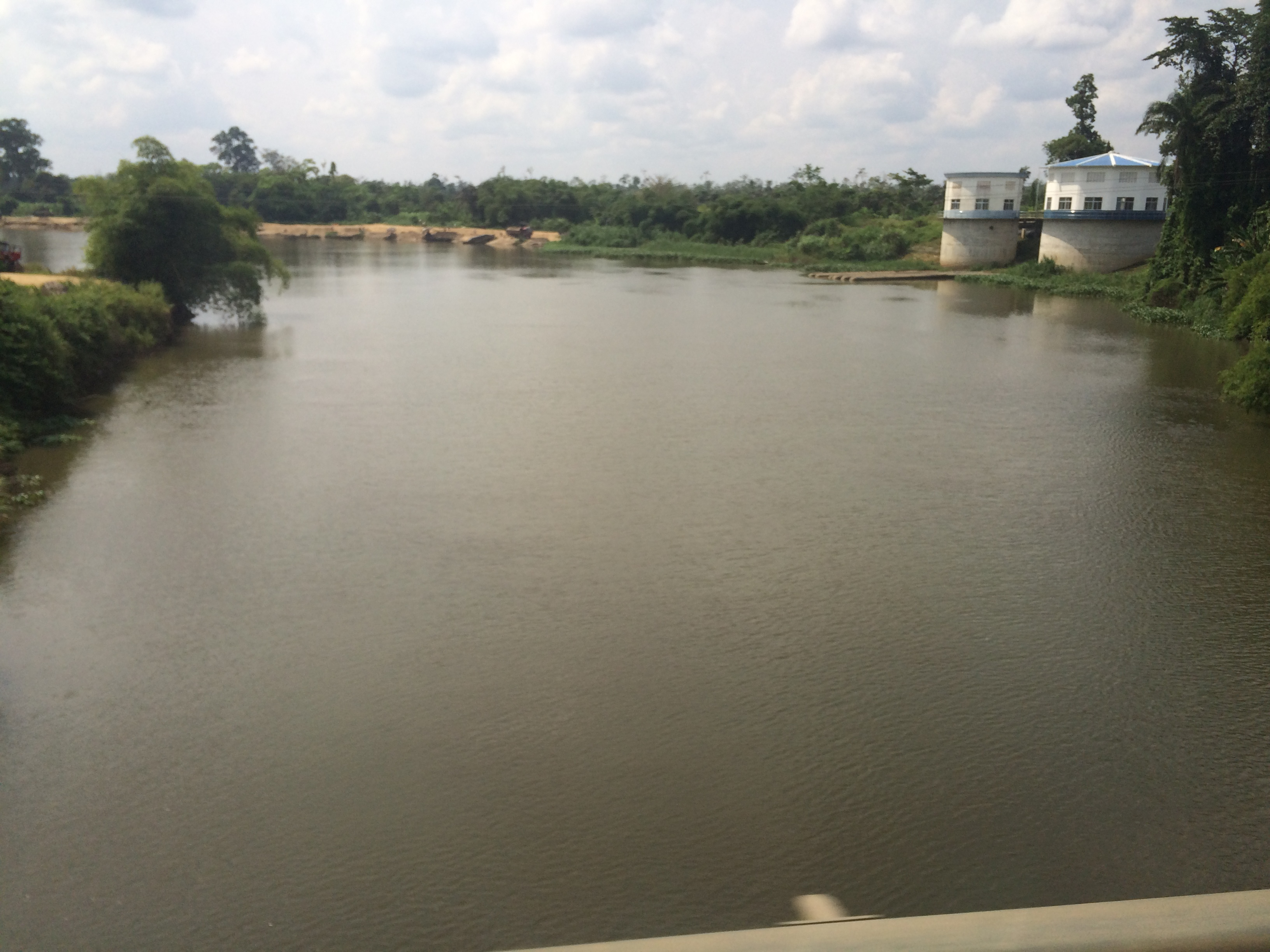
Mungo River with fishing Canoes at the far end of the picture

The country has four patterns of drainage. In the south, the principal rivers flow southwestward or westward directly to the Gulf of Guinea – the Wouri, and lesser Dibamba, Bimbia and Mungo to the Cameroon estuary near Douala; Sanaga, Nyong, and Ntem further south along the coast; Akwayafe and Manyu (which joins Nigerian Cross), and the lesser Ndian and Meme north of the coast. The Dja and Kadeï, however, drain southeastward into the Congo River. In northern Cameroon, the Benoué River (Benue) runs north and west, eventually into the Niger, while the Logone River flows northward into Lake Chad.

Some of the borders of Cameron follow rivers, including the Aïna, Akwayafe, and Ntem or Campo.

== Forests ==
Cameroon had a 2018 Forest Landscape Integrity Index mean score of 8.00/10, ranking it 29th globally out of 172 countries.

=== Tree cover extent and loss ===
Global Forest Watch publishes annual estimates of tree cover loss and 2000 tree cover extent derived from time-series analysis of Landsat satellite imagery in the Global Forest Change dataset. In this framework, tree cover refers to vegetation taller than 5 m (including natural forests and tree plantations), and tree cover loss is defined as the complete removal of tree cover canopy for a given year, regardless of cause.

For Cameroon, country statistics report cumulative tree cover loss of 2,226,205 ha (22,262.05 km^{2}) from 2001 to 2024 (about 7.1% of its 2000 tree cover area). For tree cover density greater than 30%, country statistics report a 2000 tree cover extent of 31,459,321 ha (314,593.21 km^{2}). The charts and table below display this data. In simple terms, the annual loss number is the area where tree cover disappeared in that year, and the extent number shows what remains of the 2000 tree cover baseline after subtracting cumulative loss. Forest regrowth is not included in the dataset.

Annual tree cover loss in Cameroon, 2001–2024. View chart definition.
Tree cover extent in 2000 minus cumulative tree cover loss in Cameroon, 2001–2024 (loss-only residual; does not account for gain). View chart definition.

Annual tree cover extent and loss
| Year | Tree cover extent (km2) (Note: This residual measure does not include forest regrowth.) | Annual tree cover loss (km2) |
|---|---|---|
| 2001 | 314,201.18 | 392.03 |
| 2002 | 313,913.50 | 287.68 |
| 2003 | 313,660.04 | 253.46 |
| 2004 | 313,430.00 | 230.04 |
| 2005 | 313,178.42 | 251.58 |
| 2006 | 312,818.56 | 359.86 |
| 2007 | 312,359.40 | 459.16 |
| 2008 | 312,007.99 | 351.41 |
| 2009 | 311,647.27 | 360.72 |
| 2010 | 311,067.34 | 579.93 |
| 2011 | 310,790.82 | 276.52 |
| 2012 | 310,278.15 | 512.67 |
| 2013 | 309,432.02 | 846.13 |
| 2014 | 307,613.51 | 1,818.51 |
| 2015 | 306,823.82 | 789.69 |
| 2016 | 305,657.64 | 1,166.18 |
| 2017 | 303,784.83 | 1,872.81 |
| 2018 | 302,576.69 | 1,208.14 |
| 2019 | 301,358.69 | 1,218.00 |
| 2020 | 299,330.73 | 2,027.96 |
| 2021 | 297,642.76 | 1,687.97 |
| 2022 | 296,164.67 | 1,478.09 |
| 2023 | 294,122.68 | 2,041.99 |
| 2024 | 292,331.16 | 1,791.52 |

=== REDD+ reference level and monitoring ===
Under the UNFCCC REDD+ framework, Cameroon has submitted a national forest reference level. On the UNFCCC REDD+ Web Platform, the country’s 2026 submission is listed as “under technical assessment”, while the other Warsaw Framework elements—a national strategy, safeguards, and a national forest monitoring system—are listed as “not reported”.

In its 2026 submission, Cameroon proposed its first national forest reference level as a “zero” reference level (niveau de référence zéro). The submission states that it is national in scope, covers all five REDD+ activities, uses a historical reference period of 2000–2020, and applies to the implementation period 2021–2025. The proposed benchmark is 0 t CO2 eq per year, with the government arguing that results-based payments should be claimed only for net removals because Cameroon presents itself as a net carbon sink at national level.

The submission applies a forest definition of at least 0.5 hectares, minimum canopy cover of 10%, and trees or shrubs capable of reaching a minimum height of 3 metres at maturity, while excluding mono-specific agro-industrial plantations managed primarily through agricultural techniques. It states that activity data were produced through a systematic 4 km × 4 km grid interpreted in Collect Earth Online, covering land use and land-use change for 2000–2023 across 29,409 sample plots. The proposed reference level includes biomass, dead organic matter and mineral soil carbon pools.

== Data ==
Location: Central Africa, bordering the Bight of Biafra, between Equatorial Guinea and Nigeria

Geographic coordinates: 6°N 12°E

Continent: Africa

Area:
total: 475,440 km^{2} (183,570 sq mi)
land: 472,710 km^{2} (182,510 sq mi)
water: 2,730 km^{2} (1,050 sq mi)
country rank in the world: 53rd

Area – comparative:

- Australia comparative: slightly more than twice the size of Victoria
- Canada comparative: slightly smaller than the Yukon
- United Kingdom comparative: slightly less than twice the size of the United Kingdom
- United States comparative: slightly more than 1/10 larger than California
- EU comparative: slightly smaller than Spain; slightly larger than Sweden

Land boundaries:
total: 5,018 km
border countries: Central African Republic 901 km, Chad 1,116 km, Republic of the Congo 494 km, Equatorial Guinea 183 km, Gabon 349 km, Nigeria 1,975 km

Coastline: 402 km

Maritime claims:
territorial sea: 12 nmi (22.2 km; 13.8 mi)

Terrain: diverse, with coastal plain in southwest, dissected plateau in center, mountains in west, plains in north

Elevation extremes:
lowest point: Atlantic Ocean 0 m
highest point: Fako (on. Mt. Cameroon) 4,095 m

Natural resources: petroleum, bauxite, iron ore, timber, hydropower

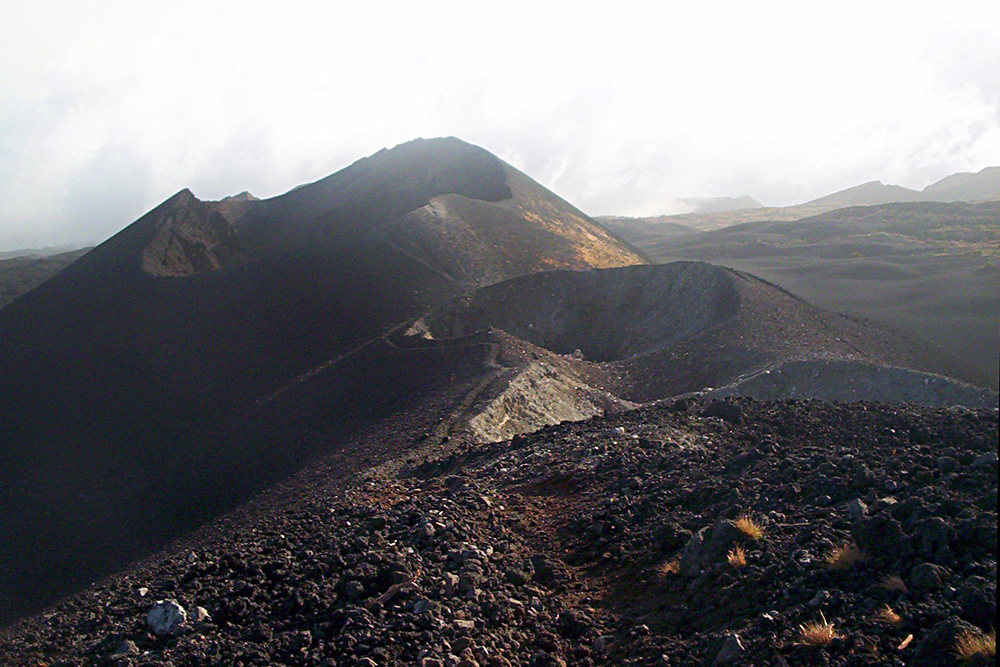
Mount Cameroon craters

Land use:
arable land: 13.12%
permanent crops: 3.28%
other: 83.61% (2012)

Irrigated land: 256.5 km^{2} (2003)

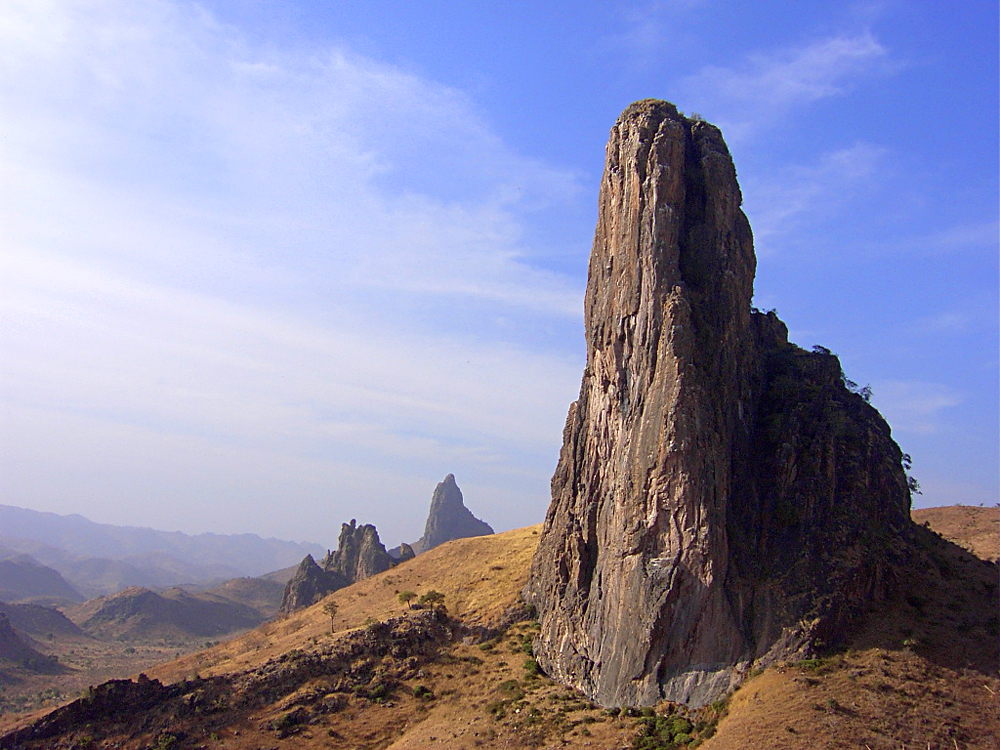
Rhumsiki Peak in Cameroon's Far North Province.

Total renewable water resources: 285.5 km^{3} (2011)

Freshwater withdrawal (domestic/industrial/agricultural):
total: 0.97 km^{3}/yr (23%/10%/68%)
per capita: 58.9 m^{3}/yr (2005)

Natural hazards: Recent limnic eruptions with release of carbon dioxide:

- from Lake Monoun, 15 August 1984, killing 37
- from Lake Nyos, 21 August 1986, killing as many as 1,800

Environment – current issues: water-borne diseases are prevalent; deforestation; overgrazing; desertification; poaching; overfishing

Environment – international agreements:
party to: Biodiversity, Climate Change, Desertification, Endangered Species, Hazardous Wastes, Law of the Sea, Ozone Layer Protection, Tropical Timber 83, Tropical Timber 94, Wetlands, Whaling
signed, but not ratified: Nuclear Test Ban

Geography – note: sometimes referred to as 'the hinge of Africa;' throughout the country there are areas of thermal springs and indications of current or prior volcanic activity; Mount Cameroon, the highest mountain in Sub-Saharan west Africa, is an active volcano

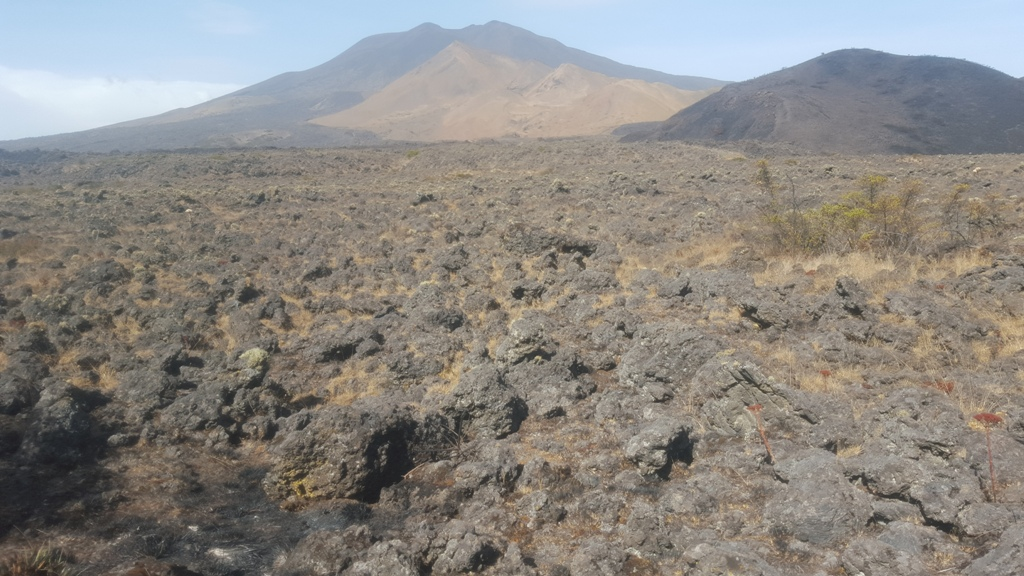
Mount Cameroon Landscape

== Extreme points ==
This is a list of the extreme points of Cameroon, the points that are farther north, south, east or west than any other location.

- Northernmost point – unnamed peninsula jutting into Lake Chad, Far North Region
- Easternmost point – unnamed location on the border with the Republic of Congo in the Sangha River opposite the Congolese town of Bomassa, East Region
- Southernmost point – unnamed headland at the confluence on the Sangha River and the Ngoko River immediately north of the Congolese town of Ouesso, East Region
- Westernmost point – unnamed point on Akwabana Island, Southwest Region

== Gallery ==
Cameroon map of Köppen climate classification.

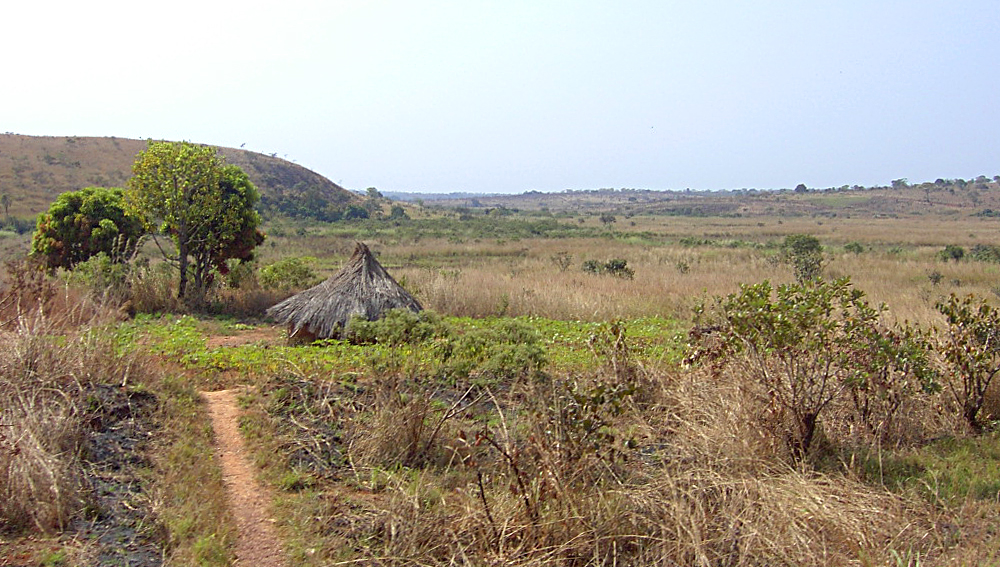
Countryside near Ngaoundal in Cameroon's Adamawa Region.

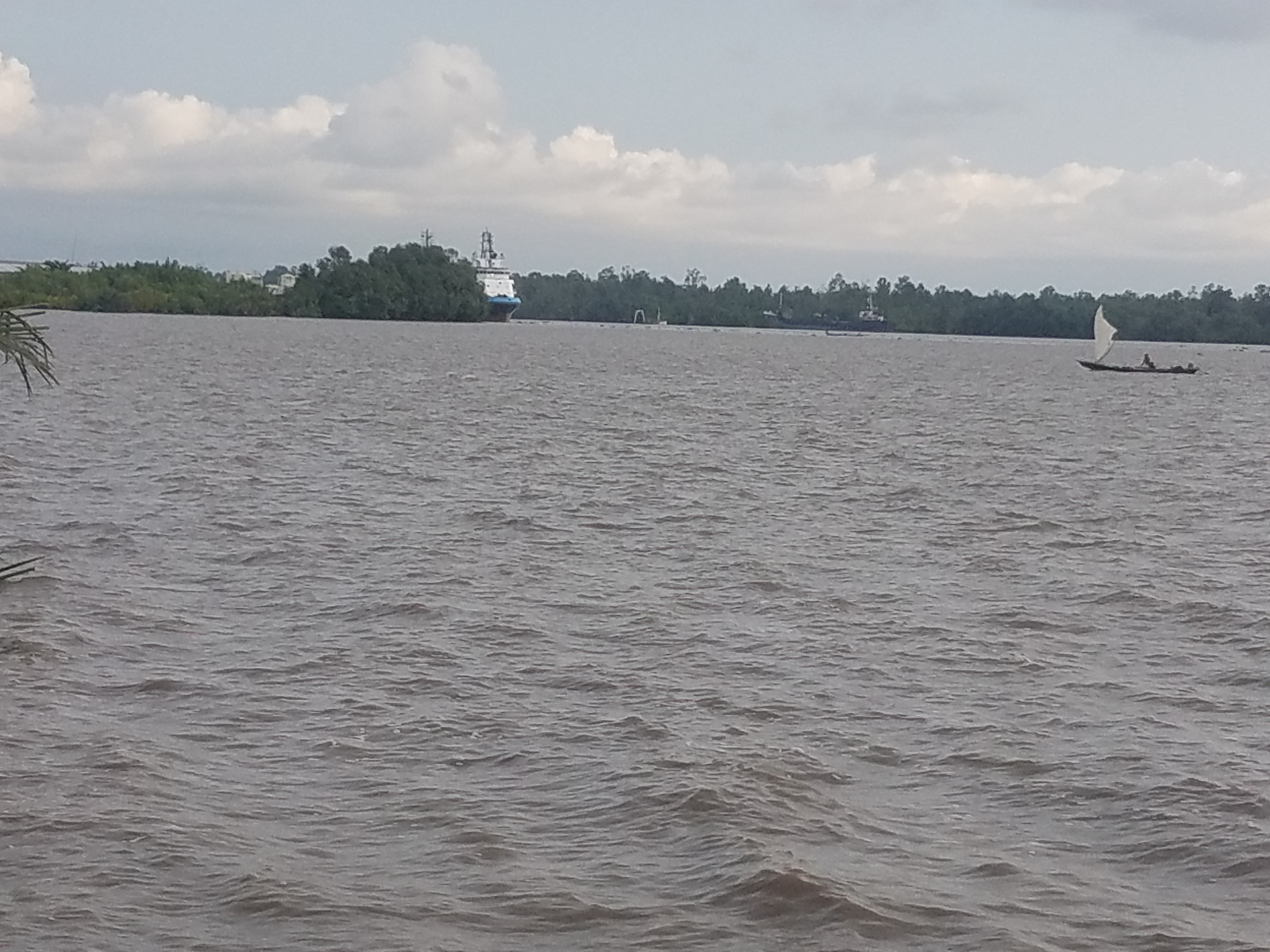
A view of Wouri River with a transport vessel in the Littoral Region of Cameroon

== See also ==
- Geology of Cameroon
- List of volcanoes in Cameroon
