= Pernambuco Fault =

Geologic fault in Brazil

Coordinates: 7°50′S 38°15′W

The Pernambuco Fault or Pernambuco Shear Zone in northeastern Brazil is a fault radiating from the Trans Brazilian Lineament eastwards to the coast, a major geological feature.

== Description ==
The Pernambuco-Alagoas domain, part of the Borborema Province, is primarily made of rocks aged between 1,600 and 1,000 million years, significantly younger than the areas to the north and south.

The Pernambuco Fault in this domain is a continuation of the Foumban Shear Zone in Cameroon, itself the western end of the Central African Shear Zone. To the west, the fault splays into numerous faults along a distance of about 50 kilometres (31 mi), suggesting that the crust was weak at this point, which is on the line where South America separated from Africa around 115 million years ago.
