= Kandi Fault Zone =

The Kandi fault zone is a southern extension of the Hoggar fault zone in West Africa, with splays in Benin, Togo and southeastern Ghana. It lies at the southern end of the Trans Saharan belt, a lineament that extends in a southwest direction from Algeria to Benin. The Kandi fault zone is identified with the Sobral fault in northeastern Brazil, considered to be the northern section of the Trans Brazilian Lineament.

The Kandi fault is a band about 400 m thick of ultramylonites with shallow-plunging stretching lineations. The nature of the deposits of the Kandi Basin indicate that they were formed during the melting of the wide ice sheet that overlay the Afro-Arabian Shield during Late Ordovician times. Kandi lies at the southern end of the Trans Saharan Kandi/4°50' lineament, which represents a suture resulting from an oblique collision between the West African craton and the Sao Francisco / Congo craton. The Sobral shear zone of the Transbrasiliano lineament is considered a continuation of this lineament. The fit between the continental margins of South America and Africa is poor in this region, in contrast to the excellent fit to the west and south, but this can be explained by splay faults created during the separation of the continents.

== Sources ==
- Attoh, K.; Brown, L. D. (2008). "The Neoproterozoic Trans-Saharan/Trans-Brasiliano shear zones: Suggested Tibetan Analogs". AGU Spring Meeting Abstracts. 2008. American Geophysical Union: S51A–04. Bibcode:2008AGUSM.S51A..04A.
- Fairhead, J D; Bournas, Nasreddine; Raddadi, M Chaker (2007). "The Role of Gravity and Aeromagnetic Data in Mapping Mega Gondwana Crustal Lineaments: the Argentina - Brazil – Algeria (ABA) Lineament" (PDF). SEG. Archived from the original (PDF) on 2011-07-11.
- Konate, M; Guiraud, M; Lang, J; Yahaya, M (April 2003). "Sedimentation in the Kandi extensional basin (Benin and Niger): fluvial and marine deposits related to the Late Ordovician deglaciation in West Africa". Journal of African Earth Sciences. 36 (3): 185–206. Bibcode:2003JAfES..36..185K. doi:10.1016/S0899-5362(03)00026-5.
- Pankhurst, Robert J. (2008). West Gondwana: pre-Cenozoic correlations across the South Atlantic Region. Geological Society. ISBN 978-1-86239-247-2.
