= Blue Nile Basin =

Rifts in Sudan and Kenya

The Blue Nile Basin is a major geological structure in the northwestern Ethiopian Plateau formed in the Mesozoic Era during a period of crustal extension associated with the break-up of Gondwana, and filled with sedimentary deposits. The modern Blue Nile river cuts across part of the sedimentary basin.

== Strata ==
The Blue Nile basin originated in an area of Neoproterozoic rocks aged about 750 Ma that had become a peneplain, possibly during the Paleozoic era (540–250 Ma (Note: Ma = Million years ago)). The basin was formed due to rifting during the Mesozoic era (250–66 Ma). Between the Triassic and early Jurassic, about 300 m of fluvial sediments were deposited by rivers and streams. During the Jurassic (200–145 Ma) the basin was twice covered by an arm of the Indian Ocean for extended periods, creating a lower limestone sediment 450 m thick and an upper limestone sediment 400 m thick. In the late Jurassic and early Cretaceous periods the basin rose, and the 280 m upper sandstone sediments, both alluvial or fluvial, were deposited. In total, about 1.4 km of sediment was deposited over the basement rocks in this period.

Later, the Afar mantle plume caused volcanic eruptions in the early and late Oligocene (34–23 Ma), depositing volcanic rocks between 500 m and 2000 m thick, with further eruptions in the Quaternary depositing another 300 m of rock. These layers have been exposed where the Blue Nile river has cut through the strata, creating a 1,600 m gorge where the rocks of different periods can be studied. However, the architecture of the basin is not well known in other areas due to the thick upper layer of comparatively recent volcanic rock.

== Rifting ==
The NW trending rift basin originated when the basement rocks were extended between the Triassic and early Cretaceous periods through forces related to the rifting of Gondwana. As the Blue Nile basin formed, it was filled with clastic and marine sediments. In the late Miocene further rifting occurred in a NW-SE extension associated with the Main Ethiopian rift, which formed NE-trending faults. In the Quaternary (2.5 Ma - present) the region was subject to further stresses as the Main Ethiopian rift opened obliquely, creating N, ESE and NW trending extensions within the basin.

Other rift basins with the same orientation formed in the region at the same time. The Blue Nile rift, Melut Basin and Muglad Basin all terminate on the line of the Central African Shear Zone, a major strike-slip shear zone. It is now known that the Muglad and Melut connect in the southeast, and then connect to the Anza trough in Kenya. It is possible that the Blue Nile basin may be a southeastern extension of the Blue Nile rift in the Sudan, and may also extend southeast of the Main Ethiopian rift, connecting to the Ogaden Basin in southeast Ethiopia.
