= Trans Brazilian Lineament =

Major shear zone that developed in the Precambrian

The Trans Brazilian Lineament (TBL), or Transbrasiliano Lineament, is a major shear zone that developed in the Precambrian period, and that has been reactivated several times since then, mostly recently during the Mesozoic. Movement along the shear zone helps explain how the South American continent could have fitted tightly to the African continent before the breakup of Gondwana.

== Formation and location ==
The TBL was formed when the Goiás Ocean, lying between the Amazonian craton and the Congo / Sao Francisco craton, was closed during the formation of West Gondwana around 600 million years ago. The lineament extends from the northeast coast of Brazil in a southwesterly direction through Paraguay and into Argentina, where it is dissipated in the Salado and Colorado extension basins.

The Trans-Saharan Belt (TSB), running from Algeria to Benin, was created in the same period. It marks the line where the Pharusian Ocean, linked to the Goiás Ocean, was closed as the West African craton collided with the Saharan Metacraton. The TSB includes the Hoggar belt, which splays into the Kandi fault zone in Benin, corresponding to the Sobral fault at the north of the TBL. Given the correspondence of faults, which is widely accepted, the TBL and TSB form perhaps the longest coherent shear zone on the Earth.

== Gondwana breakup ==
Towards the north of the lineament in Brazil, a series of splay faults show where the crust has extended, and these faults match corresponding faults in Africa. Thus the Pernambuco fault in Brazil matches the Foumban fault zone in Cameroon, and other Brazilian faults match the Benue Trough in Nigeria. The extension caused by these splay faults causes a poor fit between South America and Africa around the Niger Delta region. However, after allowing for a sinistral shear movement of about 100 km of the crust to the east of the TBL, there is an excellent fit between South America and Africa both to the south and the west of the Niger Delta.

== See also ==
- Brasiliano orogeny
