= Sobral Fault =

The Sobral fault is a major fault in the Borborema geological province of northeastern Brazil, a part of the Transbrasiliano lineament. It is commonly correlated with the Kandi fault in Benin, east of the West African craton. The fault lies in the northwest of Ceará state. It appears to have formed late in the orogeny when the West African craton engaged with the Congo craton, and to have allowed significant dextral strike-slip movement. It was reactivated when South America was breaking away from Africa. In this later phase, a sinistral shear movement of about 100 km seems to have taken place during and after the break-up.
