= Rural flight in Ethiopia =

Migration of rural inhabitants to urban places in Ethiopia

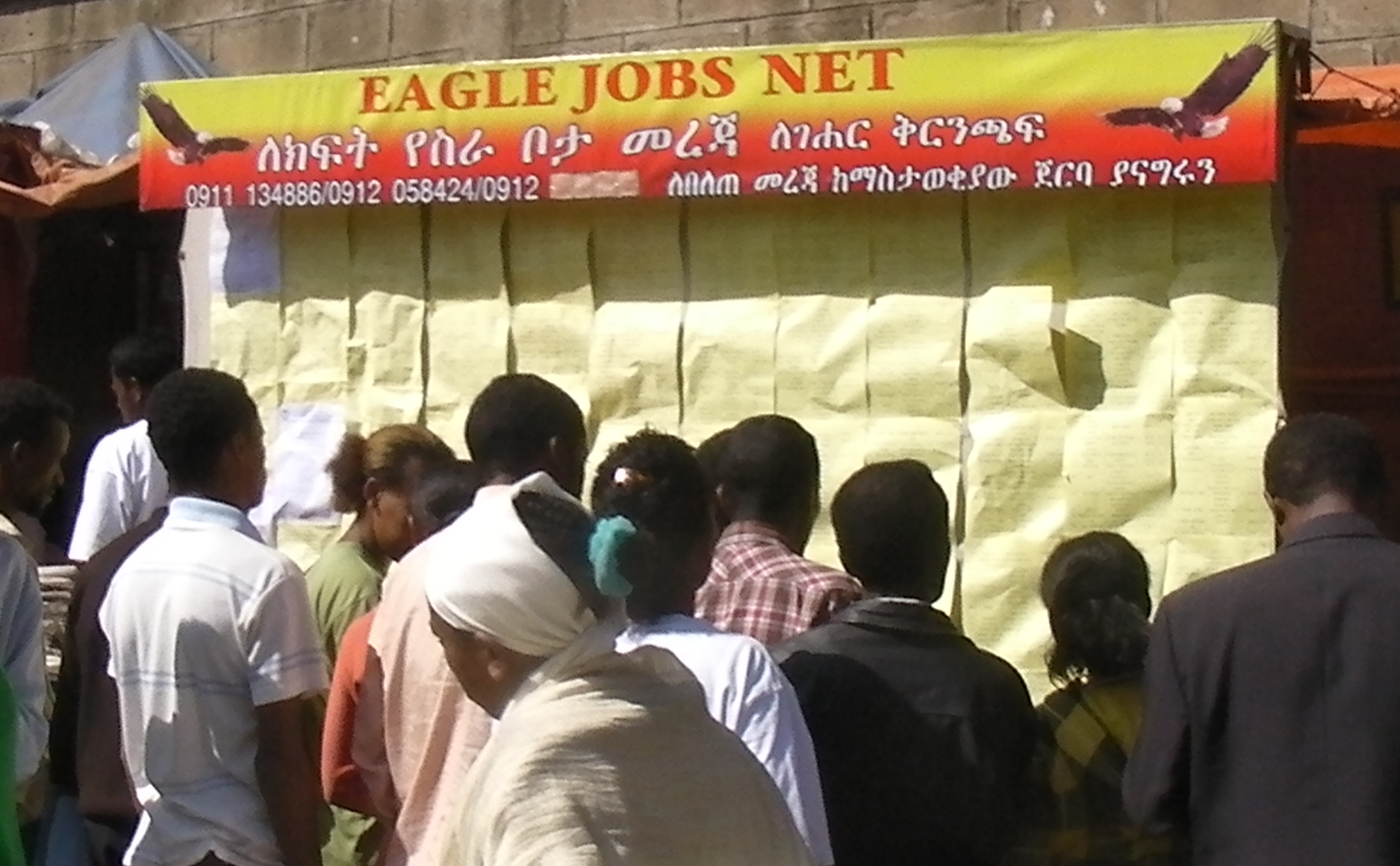
Job seekers in central Addis Ababa, reviewing advertised opportunities (2011)

Rural flight in Ethiopia has shaped the country socioeconomic, cultural, political and urban way of life. Many migrants migrated from rural areas to urban areas for the reasons of living better life and well-being as well as hoping to enroll in new job. However, the migration pattern have frequently impacted sociability tendencies as well as low resources in urban community. Eventually may create fear, insecurity and hopelessness to life.

For rural inhabitants, urban life seems expensive that could fill livelihood for the person. The Ministry of Agriculture and Natural Resources adopted Rural Job Opportunity (RJOC) strategy to resolve the problem and aims at governmental investment.

Rural-urban migration are leading factor on spreading urban crimes especially in Addis Ababa. It includes theft, smuggling and robbery. It also affects housing, infrastructure, medical service, public schools and traffic policies as well as for social welfare. Management for rural-urban migration is informal employment.

== Statistics ==
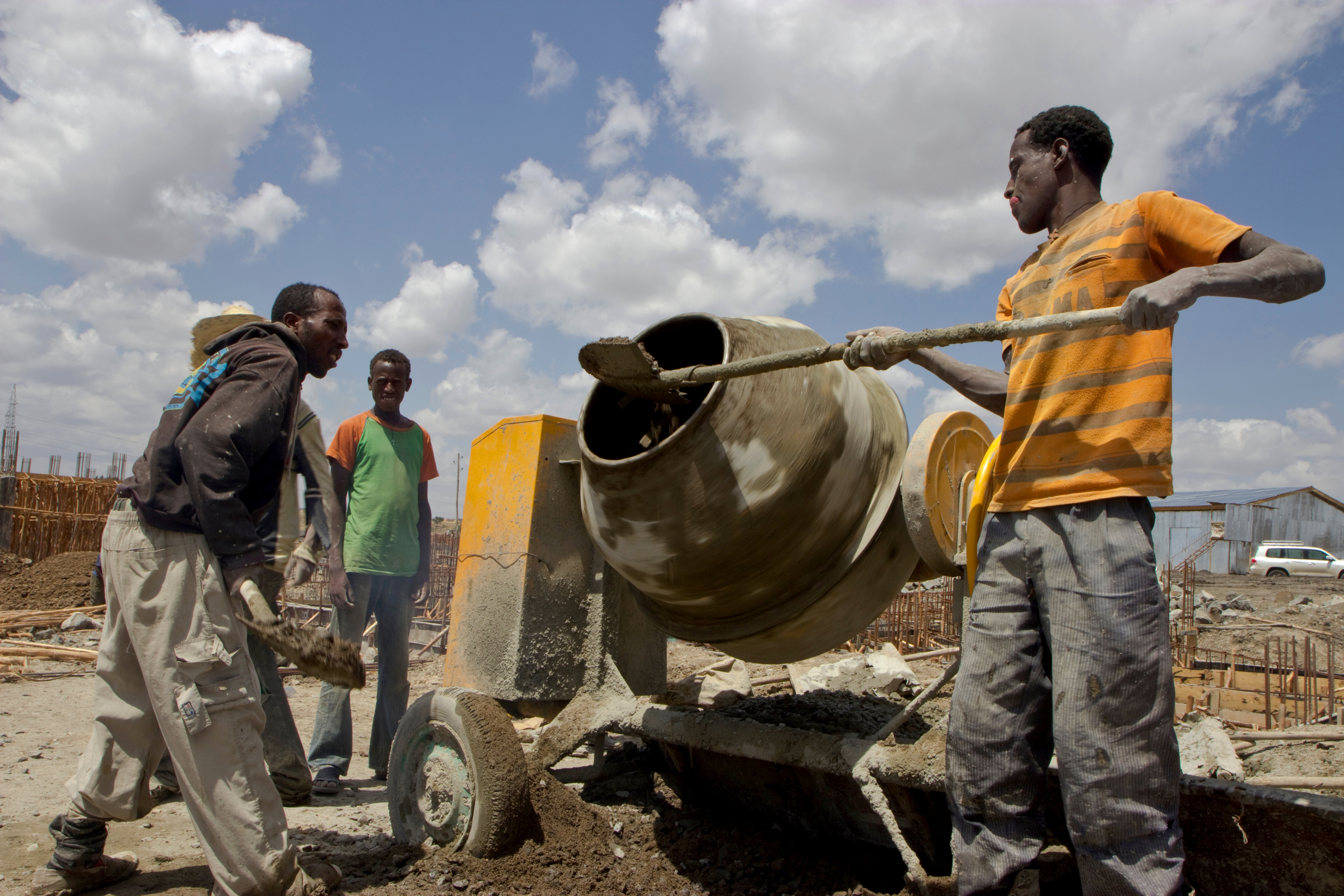
Laborers at construction site

About 80% of the Ethiopian population is living in rural areas as of 2017. Although unemployment rate in these areas is only 2% (Ministry of Agriculture and Natural Resources), migration usually undertook by young people who with limited access of agricultural lands and production. Though, unemployment has been the core problem in rural areas. According to a study by International Food Policy Research Institute (IFPRI), 28% of young people in the Blue Nile Basin in Amhara and Oromia Region have permanently migrated to urban areas between 2010 and 2014. However high unemployment in urban areas with 16.5% leads them job insecurity. Therefore, the Ministry of Agriculture and Natural Resources adopted Rural Job Opportunity Creation (RJOC) Strategy for Ethiopia to address these issues. RJOC aimed to improve the Ethiopian economy and encourages the government investment.

A 2014 report found that one-third of the households in the village experienced rural-urban migration in the period of 2007–2013, and 21% accounts young migrants. Most youth who migrate have capabilities to cover costs of transportation. Most migrations undertook for the sake of obtain better life, especially who migrate to urban areas. Youth often face restraints during migration to urban areas such as tenure insecurity, in terms of rental arrangements in residential units as well as workplace insecurity from eviction and confiscation, deemed critical problems.

Majority of youth are vulnerable to food insecurity since they do not have interaction with local people and young women seem to be more disadvantaged than male youth. They earn less informal self-employment as well as high risk of vulnerability of low resource, low income state. Migrant from Amhara Region has multiple reasons. High debt, poor harvest, service debts, spread of diseases as well as socio-culturally undesirable habits producing dysfunctional families and societal anomalies.

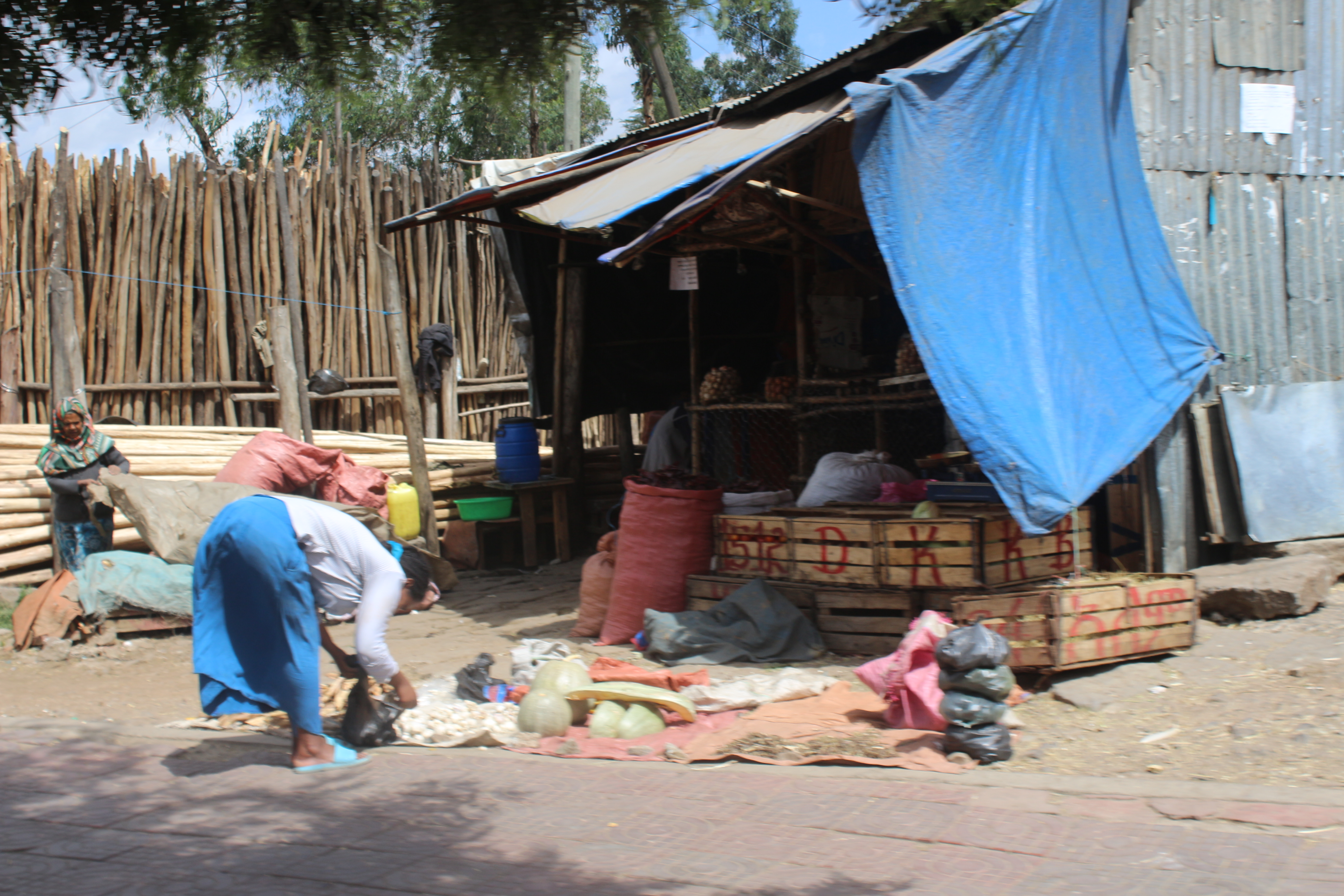
Arranging goods is part of a job

While rural poverty declined from 45.5% in 1995–96 to 23.5% in 2015–16, the urban poverty also declined 33.2% to 14.8% in the same period. Rural poverty rate is twice higher than urban poverty. Informal sector has been the major instant source of employment in Ethiopia rather than formal, which requires specialized skill and working capital.

Rural migration can be devastating factory on socioeconomic and cultural aspects. A study based on Arsi Oromo pastoralists proved that they are suffering from acute, regular water shortages and chronic food insecurity as well as incentive population growth. A declining ratio of land to people, lower agricultural productivity, and limited Infrastructure and other features prevailing in this rural community. In this study, schools are limited to primary level, and many adults remain uneducated (35% of males and 75% females have never attended school).

== Crimes ==
Rural-urban migrants, particularly youth migrants are the main perpetrators of urban crime involving theft, smuggling and human security issues. According to Erulkar et al., youth migration cannot realize their objectives and the reason why they migrated from rural places. Alemante, et al. shows that small people on the Southern Nations, Nationalities, and Peoples' Region migrated to big towns die to different reasons.

In Addis Ababa, the rural-urban migration is basic contributor of crimes. Researchers also posited that the migration flock could potentially cause environmental pollution, overcrowding in (housing, employment, medical service, public schools, Infrastructure and traffic jam), social unrest (theft, crime, pickpocket, prostitution), beggary, high living cost and poor urban amenities.
