= Central African Shear Zone =

Geological fault system in Africa

Central Africa showing the interpreted extent of the CASZ

Rifts in Sudan and Kenya

The Central African Shear Zone (CASZ) (or Shear System) is a wrench fault system extending in an ENE direction from the Gulf of Guinea through Cameroon into Sudan. The structure is not well understood. As of 2008, there was still no general agreement about how the individual shears along the lineament link up.

== Description ==
The shear zone dates to at least 640 Ma (million years ago). Motion occurred along the zone during the break-up of Gondwanaland in the Jurassic and Cretaceous periods. Some of the faults in the zone were rejuvenated more than once before and during the opening of the South Atlantic in the Cretaceous period.

It has been proposed that the Pernambuco fault in Brazil is a continuation of the shear zone to the west. In Cameroon, the CASZ cuts across the Adamawa uplift, a post-Cretaeous formation. The Benue Trough lies to the north, and the Foumban Shear Zone to the south. Volcanic activity has occurred along most of the length of the Cameroon line from 130 Ma to the present, and may be related to re-activation of the CASZ. The lithosphere beneath the CASZ in this area is thinned in a relatively narrow belt, with the asthenosphere upwelling from a depth of about 190 km to about 120 km. The Mesozoic and Tertiary movements have produced elongated rift basins in central Cameroon, northern Central African Republic and southern Chad.

== Sudan ==
The CASZ was formerly thought to extend eastward only to the Darfur region of western Sudan. It is now interpreted to extend into central and eastern Sudan, with a total length of 4,000 km. In the Sudan, the shear zone may have acted as a structural barrier to development of deep Cretaceous-Tertiary sedimentary basins in the north of the area. Objections to this theory are that the Bahr el Arab and Blue Nile rifts extend northwest beyond one proposed line for the shear zone. However, the alignment of the northwestern ends of the rifts in this areas supports the theory.
