= Saharan Metacraton =

Large area of continental crust in the north-central part of Africa

Pannotia super-continent c. 570 Ma

The Saharan Metacraton is a large area of continental crust in the north-central part of Africa. Whereas a craton is an old and stable part of the lithosphere, the term "metacraton" is used to describe a craton that has been remobilized during an orogenic event, but where the characteristics of the original craton are still identifiable. The geology of the continent has only been partially explored, and other names have been used to describe the general area that reflect different views of its nature and extent. These include "Nile Craton", "Sahara Congo Craton", "Eastern Saharan Craton" and "Central Saharan Ghost Craton". This last term is because the older rocks are almost completely covered by recent sediments and desert sands, making geological analysis difficult.

== Extent ==
The "metacraton" covers an area of about 5,000,000 square kilometres (1,900,000 sq mi). It lies between the Tuareg shield to the west, the Congo craton to the south, the Arabian-Nubian Shield to the east, and the northern African continental margin. The southern boundary is not well-defined, but may be considered to run along the northern edge of the Oubangides orogenic belt in the southwest and the Aswa Shear Zone further east. It lies under southern Egypt and Libya and western Sudan, northern Kenya, Uganda and Congo, the Central African Republic, Cameroon and eastern Nigeria and Chad.

== Chronology ==
Saharan Metacraton and neighboring areas

The craton may have formed during a period of accelerated crustal growth between 3000 Ma and 2000 Ma (Ma: million years ago). The oldest rocks in Egypt date to about 2700 Ma. Rocks in southern Libya and eastern Chad have been dated between 2900 Ma and 2600 Ma. Some geologists date a rifting episode to between 1200 Ma and 950 Ma.

The Pan-African orogeny saw the cratons that had formed the Rodinia super-continent come together in a completely new arrangement into the Gondwana super-continent around 500 Ma. The "Pharusian Ocean", which separated the West African craton from the Saharan craton around 800 Ma, began to close about 730 Ma, and about 635 Ma these two cratons collided, with the basement of the Saharan craton undergoing extensive reworking in the process. The Saharan craton may have been decratonized, perhaps oceanized, during the Pan-African event. At the end of this period the craton was extended and rifts appeared. By about 500 Ma the Saharan craton was sutured with the Congo craton during the final assembly of Gondwana. Although Gondwana later split up, the core African Plate remained intact.

A different theory of the area's evolution has the Nile craton in southern Libya and eastern Chad as an extension of the Congo craton, remaining as an intact unit during the break-up of Rodinia between 1000 Ma and 700 Ma, and during the subsequent Pan-African event. In this scenario, a fragment of craton found in the Hoggar Mountains, dating from the late Proterozoic, is called the East Saharan craton, originally far from the Nile craton with which it was joined only during the Pan-African event.

Perhaps the simplest view is that the "craton" is an assembly of microcontinental blocks with different origins that were swept together during the Pan African orogeny.
