= Foumban Shear Zone =

Fault zone in Cameroon

Coordinates: 6°37′0″N 12°52′0″E

The Foumban Shear Zone, or Central Cameroon Shear Zone (CCSZ), is a fault zone in Cameroon that has been correlated with the Pernambuco fault in northeastern Brazil, which splays from the Trans-Brazilian Lineament. It is part of the Central African Shear Zone (CASZ) and dates to at least 640 million years ago. The zone was rejuvenated several times, usually with a dextral movement, before and during the opening of the South Atlantic in the Cretaceous period.

The Foumban shear zone is a series of faults associated with major mylonite zones, a segment of the CASZ. The CASZ can be traced from the Sudan to the Adamawa Plateau, after which its path is obscured by volcanoes. Based on reconstruction of the configuration of South America before it separated from Africa, the zone can be identified with the Pernambuco fault. The shear zone underlies a chain of active volcanoes, called the Cameroon Volcanic Line. In August 1986 a magnitude 5 earthquake with epicenter near Lake Nyos indicated that the shear zone may be again reactivating.
