= Bahr el Arab rift =

Major geological feature in the southwest Sudan

Rifts in Sudan and Kenya

The Bahr el Arab rift is a major geological feature in the southwest Sudan.

The Bahr el Arab rift is made up of the Baggara graben, between the Central African Republic and the Nuba Mountains to the east, and the Sudd graben further south. It terminates to the north on the faulted Mesozoic deposits south of the Darfur Dome. The Babanusa trough has extensive faulting, increasing towards the south, reaching a depth of 5 km at the Unity oil field and 11 km south of the Bentiu oil fields.
