= Lineament =

Linear landscape feature

A lineament is a linear feature in a landscape which is an expression of an underlying geological structure such as a fault. Typically a lineament will appear as a fault-aligned valley, a series of fault or fold-aligned hills, a straight coastline or indeed a combination of these features. Fracture zones, shear zones and igneous intrusions such as dykes can also be expressed as geomorphic lineaments.

Lineaments are often apparent in geological or topographic maps and can appear obvious on aerial or satellite photographs. There are for example, several instances within Great Britain. In Scotland the Great Glen Fault and Highland Boundary Fault give rise to lineaments as does the Malvern Line in western England and the Neath Disturbance in South Wales.

The term 'megalineament' has been used to describe such features on a continental scale. The trace of the San Andreas Fault might be considered an example. The Trans Brazilian Lineament and the Trans-Saharan Belt, taken together, form perhaps the longest coherent shear zone on Earth, extending for about 4,000 km.

Lineaments have also been identified on other planets and their moons. Their origins may be radically different from those of terrestrial lineaments due to the differing tectonic processes involved.
