= List of volcanoes in Sudan =

This is a list of active and extinct volcanoes in Sudan.

Name	Elevation		Location	Last eruption
Name	meters	feet	Coordinates	Last eruption
Bayuda Volcanic Field	670	2198	18.33°N 32.75°E	850 CE
Jebel Marra	3042	9978	12.95°N 24.27°E	1500 BCE
Jebel Umm Arafieb	-	-	18.17°N 33.83°E	Holocene
Kutum Volcanic Field	-	-	14.57°N 25.85°E	Holocene
Meidob Volcanic Field	2000	6562	15.32°N 26.47°E	2500 BCE
