= List of World Heritage Sites in Sudan =

Location of World Heritage Sites in Sudan. Red dots are the two cultural sites, green dots are the two components of the natural site.

The United Nations Educational, Scientific and Cultural Organization (UNESCO) World Heritage Sites are places of importance to cultural or natural heritage as described in the UNESCO World Heritage Convention, established in 1972. Cultural heritage consists of monuments (such as architectural works, monumental sculptures, or inscriptions), groups of buildings, and sites (including archaeological sites). Natural features (consisting of physical and biological formations), geological and physiographical formations (including habitats of threatened species of animals and plants), and natural sites which are important from the point of view of science, conservation, or natural beauty, are defined as natural heritage. Sudan accepted the convention on 6 June 1974. There are three World Heritage Sites in Sudan, with a further 15 on the tentative list.

The first site to be listed to in Sudan was Jebel Barkal and its associated sites in 2003. The site of Meroë were listed in 2011 and the site Sanganeb Marine National Park and Dungonab Bay – Mukkawar Island Marine National Park in 2016. The latter is a natural site while the first two are listed for their cultural significance. Sudan has served one term on the World Heritage Committee.

== World Heritage Sites ==
UNESCO lists sites under ten criteria; each entry must meet at least one of the criteria. Criteria i through vi are cultural, and vii through x are natural.

World Heritage Sites
Site	Image	Location (state)	Year listed	UNESCO data	Description
Gebel Barkal and the Sites of the Napatan Region	Jebel Bakar mesa in a desert	Northern	2003	1073; i, ii, iii, iv, vi (cultural)	The archaeological area in Nubia comprises sites from the Napatan (900 to 270 BCE) and Meroitic (270 BCE to 350 CE) cultures of the Kingdom of Kush. Jebel Barkal (pictured) with the Temple of Amun at its foot was considered a sacred mountain. Monuments include temples, tombs, palaces, residential buildings, and Nubian pyramids, which have steep angles and decorated sides. Some aspects of burial practices remained in use until the introduction of Christianity in the 6th century.
Archaeological Sites of the Island of Meroe	Three Nubian pyramids, partially in ruins	River Nile	2011	1336; ii, iii, iv, v (cultural)	This site comprises three archaeological sites on the Island of Meroë between the Nile and the Atbarah River: the city of Meroë and the settlements of Musawwarat es-Sufra and Naqa. Meroë was the capital of the Kingdom of Kush, a major power from the 8th century BCE to the 4th century CE. During the Third Intermediate Period of Egypt, Kushite pharaohs ruled Egypt as the Twenty-fifth Dynasty (754 BCE–656 BCE). The kingdom declined with the arrival of Christianity in the 6th century. Monuments include several Nubian pyramids (pictured), temples, tombs, and residential buildings. The architecture reflects the interaction of cultures of Sub-Saharan Africa, the Mediterranean, and the Middle East.
Sanganeb Marine National Park and Dungonab Bay – Mukkawar Island Marine National Park		Red Sea	2016	262rev; vii, ix, x (natural)	This site comprises two marine and coastal areas in the Red Sea. Sanganeb is an isolated atoll with some of the world's northernmost coral reef systems. Dungonab Bay with Mukkawar Island has coral reefs, mangrove forests, seagrass meadows, and intertidal mudflats. It is home to an important population of endangered dugongs. Other animals that live in the area include manta rays, sea turtles, sharks, and dolphins. There are numerous endemic reef fish species. The area is also important for migratory birds.

== Tentative list ==
In addition to sites inscribed on the World Heritage List, member states can maintain a list of tentative sites that they may consider for nomination. Nominations for the World Heritage List are only accepted if the site was previously listed on the tentative list. Sudan maintains 15 properties on its tentative list.

Tentative sites
Site	Image	Location (state)	Year listed	UNESCO criteria	Description
Suakin	Mosque and minaret with green roofs	Red Sea	1994	(cultural)	Suakin was an important medieval and Ottoman-era port. It has fine houses and mosques.
Kerma	Ruins of a settlement in mudbrick	Northern	1994	(cultural)	Kerma was the centre of the Kerma culture in the 3rd and 2nd millennia BCE. There are remains of mudbrick buildings and a large cemetery with a funerary chapel.
Old Dongola	Ruins with column bases in a desert setting	Northern	1994	(cultural)	Old Dongola was the capital of Makuria, a Christian kingdom that existed between the 7th and 14th centuries. There are several houses, churches, and mosques, with some buildings having walls finely decorated with frescoes.
Wadi Howar National Park		Northern	2004	vii, viii, ix, x (natural)	Wadi Howar used to be a tributary of the Nile during the African humid period, today it is a wadi. The national park that encompasses it contains the Meidob volcanic field, the Jebel Rahib hills, paleo lakes, and dunes. The area is home to the Dorcas gazelle, ostrich, and Barbary sheep.
Dinder National Park	A view of the river from a plane	Sennar	2021	vii, ix, x (natural)	The park is biologically significant because it falls on the ecotone between the Sahel and Ethiopian Highlands ecoregions. It contains three distinct ecosystems, riverine-riparian zone, woodlands, and mayas, which are wetlands with oxbow lakes. Rich in biodiversity, it is home to the tiang, roan antelope, warthog, baboon, and lion.
Jebel Al Dair National Park	Satellite image of a mountain in the middle of a savanna	North Kordofan	2021	vii, ix, x (natural)	The park centres around the Jebel Dair, a group of mountains that peak almost 1,000 m (3,300 ft) above the surrounding plains with dry savanna, reaching elevations above 1,400 m (4,600 ft). This setting allowed four different habitat types to evolve on the mountain slopes. There are several springs on the mountains, some of them seasonal. The area is rich in plant diversity, with numerous herb, shrub, grass, and tree species. Animals of the park include the rock hyrax, greater kudu, and baboon.
Al Hassania National Park		River Nile	2021	vii, ix, x (natural)	The area comprises desert and semi desert ecosystems. There are sand dunes, wadis, and mountains. The vegetation is sparse, with shrubs and grasses. The park is home to the Barbary sheep and Dorcas gazelle.
Al Radom National Park		South Darfur	2021	vii, ix, x (natural)	The area is covered by wooded savanna and receives high rainfall. There are numerous rivers, streams, and oxbow lakes. Abundant water resources support diverse wildlife, in particular birds, such as the saddle-billed stork, Abyssinian ground hornbill, and marabou stork. There are also numerous termite mounds.
Jebel Marra / Deriba Caldera (crater lake)	A crater lake	Central Darfur	2021	vii, viii, ix, x (natural)	Jebel Marra is the highest mountain range in Sudan, reaching an elevation of 3,042 metres (9,980 ft). Deriba, the highest peak, is a dormant volcano with two crater lakes (one pictured) in the collapsed mouth. There are also hot springs and fumaroles. The mountains support diverse habitat types and are rich in biodiversity, with 295 recorded bird species.
The Monuments of the Kingdom of Kerma and Dokki Geil	Ruins of a mudbrick temple	Northern	2022	i, ii, iii, iv, v (cultural)	This nomination comprises the archaeological sites of Kerma, the centre of the Kerma culture that flourished between 2500 and 1500 BCE, and the nearby ceremonial city Dokki Geil that was founded by the Egyptian pharaohs of the Eighteenth Dynasty of Egypt that conquered Kerma c. 1500 BCE. Remains in Kerma include temples, palaces, residential buildings, storage places, and fortifications. Western Deffufa, a large mudbrick temple, is pictured.
Sai Island		Northern	2022	ii, iii, iv (cultural)	Saï is the largest island in the Nile. Excavations have uncovered traces of Homo erectus and early Homo sapiens. In historical times, it was an important Egyptian site in Nubia during the New Kingdom period, illustrating the interactions between Egyptian and Nubian cultures. It was the seat of medieval Christian bishops and has an Ottoman fort from the 16th century.
The Temple of Soleb	Ruins of an Egyptian temple with several standing columns	Northern	2022	ii, iii, iv (cultural)	The temple was constructed during the reign of Amenhotep III (1378-1348 BCE), in the New Kingdom period, and remained in use for several generations. Initially dedicated to Amun, it was rededicated to Aten under the rule of Akhenaten. Artistically, the temple marks a transition of the more conservative style of Thutmose IV to more naturalistic depictions of humans. It has both Egyptian and Nubian gods portrayed on the walls, showing the harmonious coexistence of the two cultures in that period.
Banganarti	Restored ruins of a church in a dry setting	Northern	2022	ii, iii, iv, v (cultural)	A large church in Banganarti was an important pilgrimage site in the Middle Nile area, attracting pilgrims from as far as France and Yemen. It was dedicated to the archangel Raphael. It was built in the 11th century in Byzantine style upon the site of an earlier church. There are numerous pictures and graffiti on the walls, left by the pilgrims through the centuries. The church was abandoned in the 15th century.
Al Khandaq Village		Northern	2022	ii, iii, iv (cultural)	The village, located on the site of earlier New Kingdom and Makurian settlements, used to be an important port on the Nile, until it started to decline in the 20th century. It has two-storey mudbrick buildings that were used by rich merchants.
Wadi Hower National Park - Gala Abou Ahmed (mixed natural and cultural site)		Northern, North Darfur, North Kordofan	2022	ii, iii, v, vii, ix, x (mixed)	Wadi Howar used to be a tributary of the Nile during the African humid period, today it is a wadi. The national park that encompasses it contains Meidob volcanic field, Jebel Rahib hills, paleo lakes, and dunes. The area is home to the Dorcas gazelle, ostrich, and Barbary sheep. The park has already been listed on the tentative list in 2004. This nomination extends to the numerous archaeological sites in the area, indicating human occupation between the 6th and 1st millennia BCE, and the fortress Gala Abu Ahmed from the Napatan period.

== See also ==
- List of Intangible Cultural Heritage elements in Sudan
