= Bayuda volcanic field =

Volcanic field in Sudan

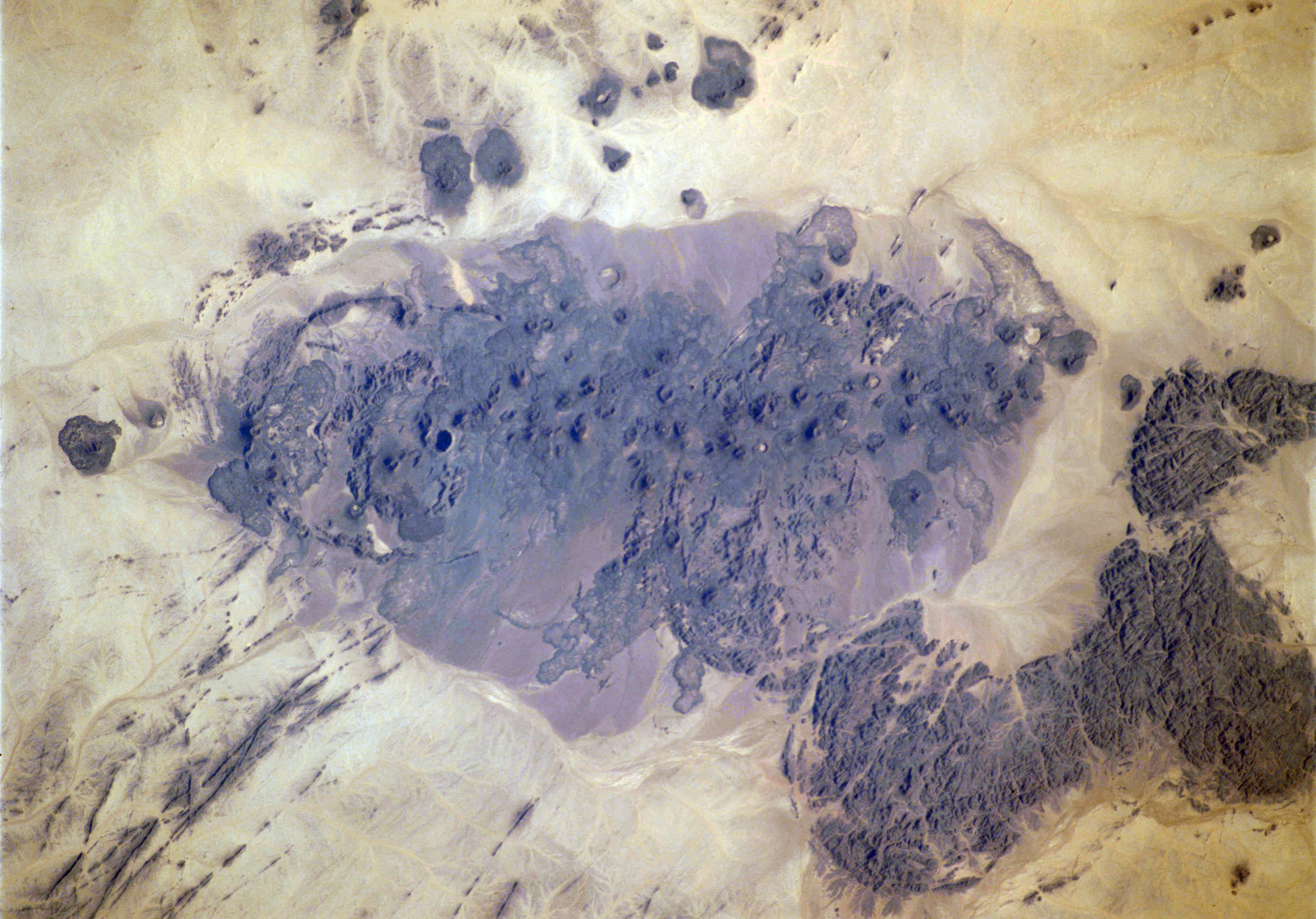
- The volcanic field from space

Highest point
- Elevation: 670 m (2,200 ft)
- Coordinates: 18.33°N 32.75°E

Geography
- Location within Sudan

Geology
- Last eruption: 1,102 ± 48 years ago

Bayuda volcanic field (also spelled Bayiuda) is a volcanic field in Sudan, within the Bayuda Desert. It covers a surface of about 11 by 48 kilometres (6.8 mi × 29.8 mi) and consists of a number of cinder cones as well as some maars and explosion craters. These vents have erupted 'a'ā lava flows.

The field rises above a Precambrian-Paleozoic basement that may be a domal uplift. There is little known about the occurrence of volcanic eruptions, but the last eruption has been dated to 1,102 ± 48 years before present.

== Geography and geomorphology ==
The volcanic field is located in the Bayuda Desert within the great bend of the Nile, 300 kilometres (190 mi) north of Khartoum. It lies 80 kilometres (50 mi) away from Merowe; there are wells at Abu Khorit and Sani north of the volcanic field. The field was discovered by aerial photography in 1920. Numerous Middle Stone Age and Paleolithic archeological sites are found in the field.

Bayuda is an elongated volcanic field with fresh volcanic features extending over an area of 11 by 48 kilometres (6.8 mi × 29.8 mi) in a northwesterly direction. Within this area, a number of volcanic vents within a narrow space have formed a continuous volcanic surface. Some individual lava fields cover over 20 square kilometres (7.7 sq mi) of surface, but surfaces of about 10 square kilometres (3.9 sq mi) are more typical. There are usually only a few flows per vent, although they often have lobate structures. The surface of the lava flows has varying textures and often contains hills or ridges, generally corresponding to aa lava. Some flows reach lengths of 10 kilometres (6.2 mi) and thicknesses of 30 metres (98 ft). The flows are often covered by ridges and hillocks.

Cinder cones make up the bulk of the field, of which there are about one hundred. Usually the cones reach heights of over 400 metres (1,300 ft) and are formed by volcanic ash, lapilli, lava bombs, and scoria. Many of these aside from pyroclastics also erupted lava flows which then broke the crater rims. Explosion craters and sporadic maars are also found, they are surrounded by tephra deposits which form low rims of pyroclastic material and which also cover neighboring volcanoes. Individual vents form two separate alignments.

Hosh ed Salam ("dark enclosure") crater is 500 metres (1,600 ft) deep and 1,300 metres (4,300 ft) wide; other craters are Jebel Hebeish and El Muweilih, which have formed shallow rises above the surrounding terrain and have cut into the basement rocks. El Muweilih contains a salt lake after which it is named and which was used as a source of salt, while Jebel El Abour contains a secondary cone. The Sergein hills and Jebel Azrub are composite volcanoes. Angalafib, Goan, and Jebel El Abour are also quite high.

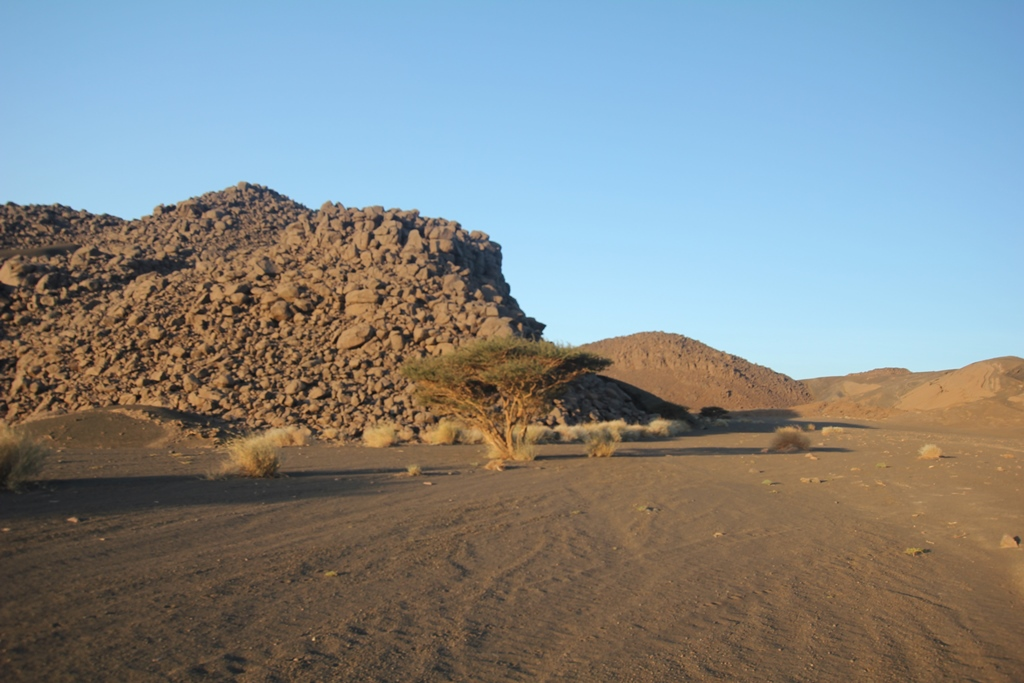
Lava and scoria from Bayuda

Pumice blocks from the field were found in Wadi Abu Dom, and scoria downstream in the Nile. Tephra identified in deposits on Mograt Island in the Nile most likely comes from this volcanic field. The volcanic field is a potential site for geothermal power development, with temperatures underground of about 200 °C (392 °F).

== Geology ==
Volcanic activity has been taking place in Sudan since the Cretaceous, with most recent manifestations documented in the Bayuda volcanic field, Marra Mountains and Meidob volcanic field in Darfur, and elsewhere in the form of small basaltic outcrops. Bayuda is small in comparison to other African volcanic fields. Volcanism at Bayuda may be associated with the Central African Shear Zone and Precambrian faults, perhaps together with a mantle plume. The area features four more volcanic fields, the Northern Field northeast, the Abu Rugheiwa field southeast, and Shaq Umm Bosh and Muqqodom southwest of Bayuda.

The basement consists of granites of Precambrian and Paleozoic age that belong to the Bayuda terrane, which together with gneisses form a gentle pediplain away from rougher landscape along the Nile. Later on during the Cretaceous the Nubian Formation was laid down, and there are hints of a domal uplift in the Bayuda area, which probably predates the onset of volcanism and may have influenced the course of the Nile. The existence of such a dome has been questioned, however.

=== Composition ===
Bayuda has erupted basaltic rocks, with most collected rocks belonging to an alkali basalt suite although basanite, melabasanite, hawaiite, and trachybasalt have been identified as well. Phenocrysts include clinopyroxene and olivine. Various xenoliths have been found, including garnet-containing clinopyroxenite, harzburgite, garnet hornblendite, amphibole-containing peridotite, olivine and spinel pyroxenite, and websterite.

In general, the composition resembles that of other Sudanese-Egyptian volcanoes, and about two different magma families have been identified which originate from disparate mantle domains. Crystal fractionation of clinopyroxene, olivine and spinels took part in the formation of the magmas. The total volume of the volcanic rocks is about 18 cubic kilometres (4.3 cu mi); the rocks reach thicknesses of about 200 metres (660 ft) maximally.

== Eruptive history ==
Volcanic activity has been dated to 1.7–0.9 million years ago, but it continued after the end of the latest wet period 5,000 years ago as indicated by the uneroded state of some of the volcanoes such as Hosh ed Salam. The presence of maars and volcanoes with signs of phreatomagmatic activity may indicate activity during pluvials. Volcanism at Bayuda commenced with isolated volcanoes. After a while, new edifices were constructed atop the older ones, influencing the morphology of the new volcanoes.

The most recent lava flow was dated to less than 1,100 years before present, with radiocarbon dating producing an age of 1,102 ± 48 years before present. Aside from this date, however, there is little information on the timing of recent volcanic activity in the Bayuda volcanic field.

== See also ==
- List of volcanic fields
