= Darfur Dome =

Geographical area in western Sudan

Coordinates: 13°5′0″N 24°20′0″E

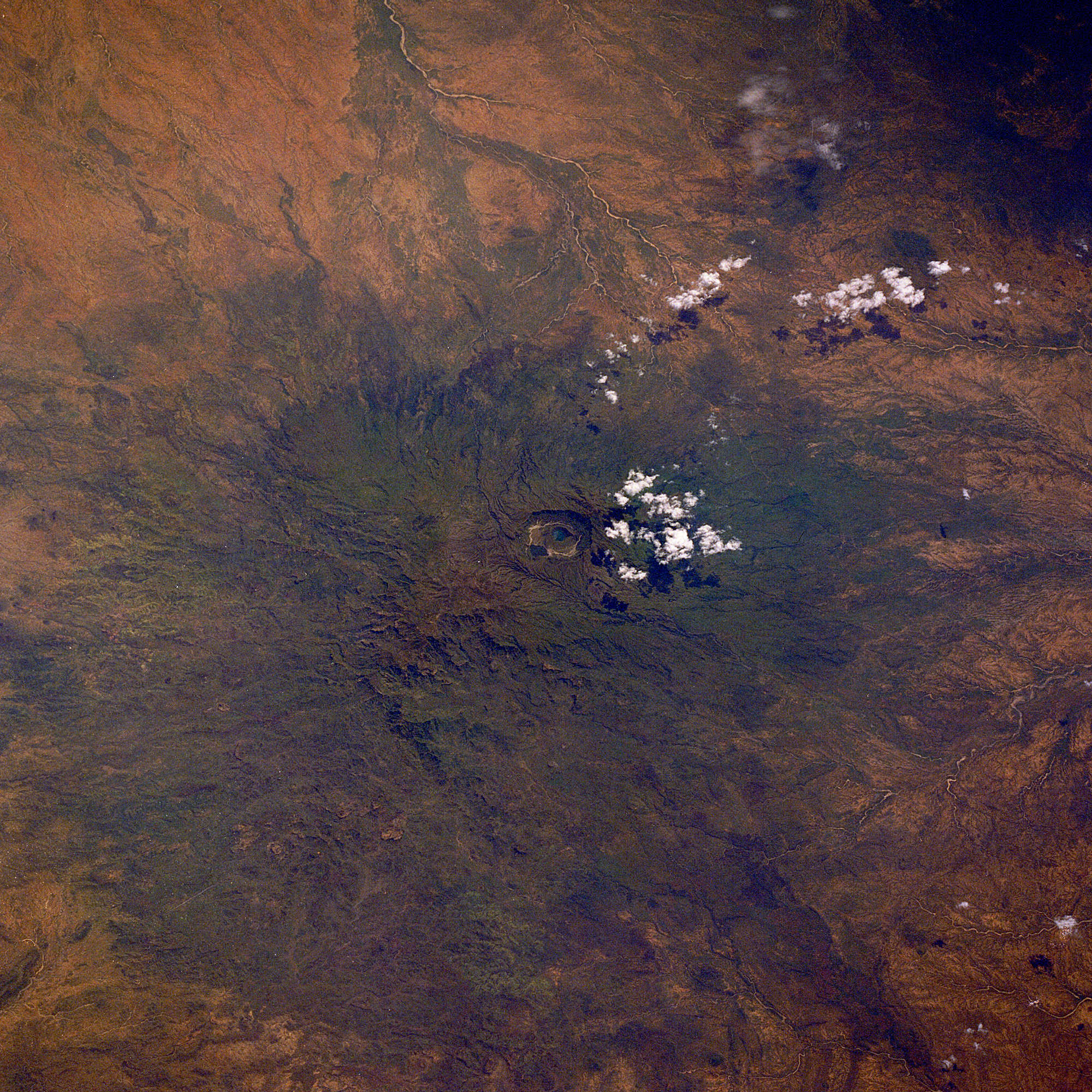
The Darfur Volcanic Province from ISS.

Darfur Dome or Darfur Volcanic Province is an area of about 100x400 km in Western Sudan. As well as its best-known and central feature, Deriba Crater, it encompasses the surrounding Marra Mountains (Jebel Marra) and Tagabo Hills, both formed around 16–10 Ma, and the Meidob Hills, formed around 6.8 Ma.

There are currently two competing theories concerning Darfur Dome’s formation. The conventional view is that magmatism is the product of a rising mantle plume, with active volcanism being triggered by stress resolution along the Central African Fault Zone. Evidence for a plume origin includes domal uplift, gravity anomalies, and low seismic velocity zones in the mantle, though there is disagreement over whether these indicate a discreet, narrow plume under the Darfur region or a broad superplume with conduits feeding several African hotspots.

Recently, some scientists have argued for a tectonic origin in which lithospheric extension, asthenospheric shear, and small-scale convection have enabled passive melting of shallow source material. This interpretation is supported by high seismic shear wave velocities which indicate shallow, cold downwellings as well as normal heat-flow and low helium isotope ratios.

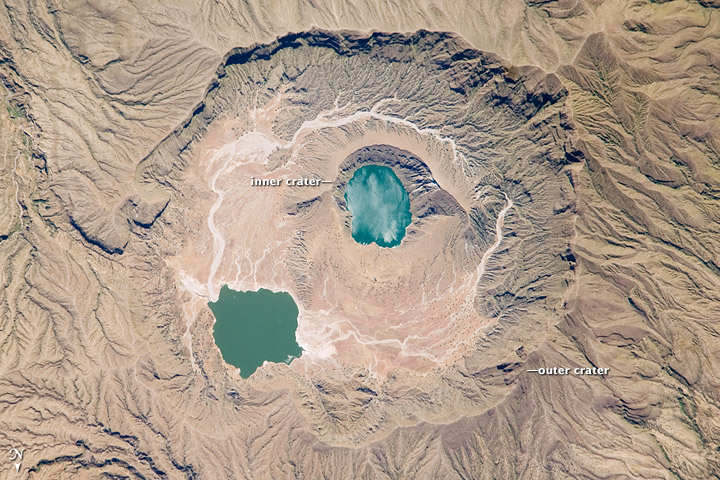
Deriba Caldera

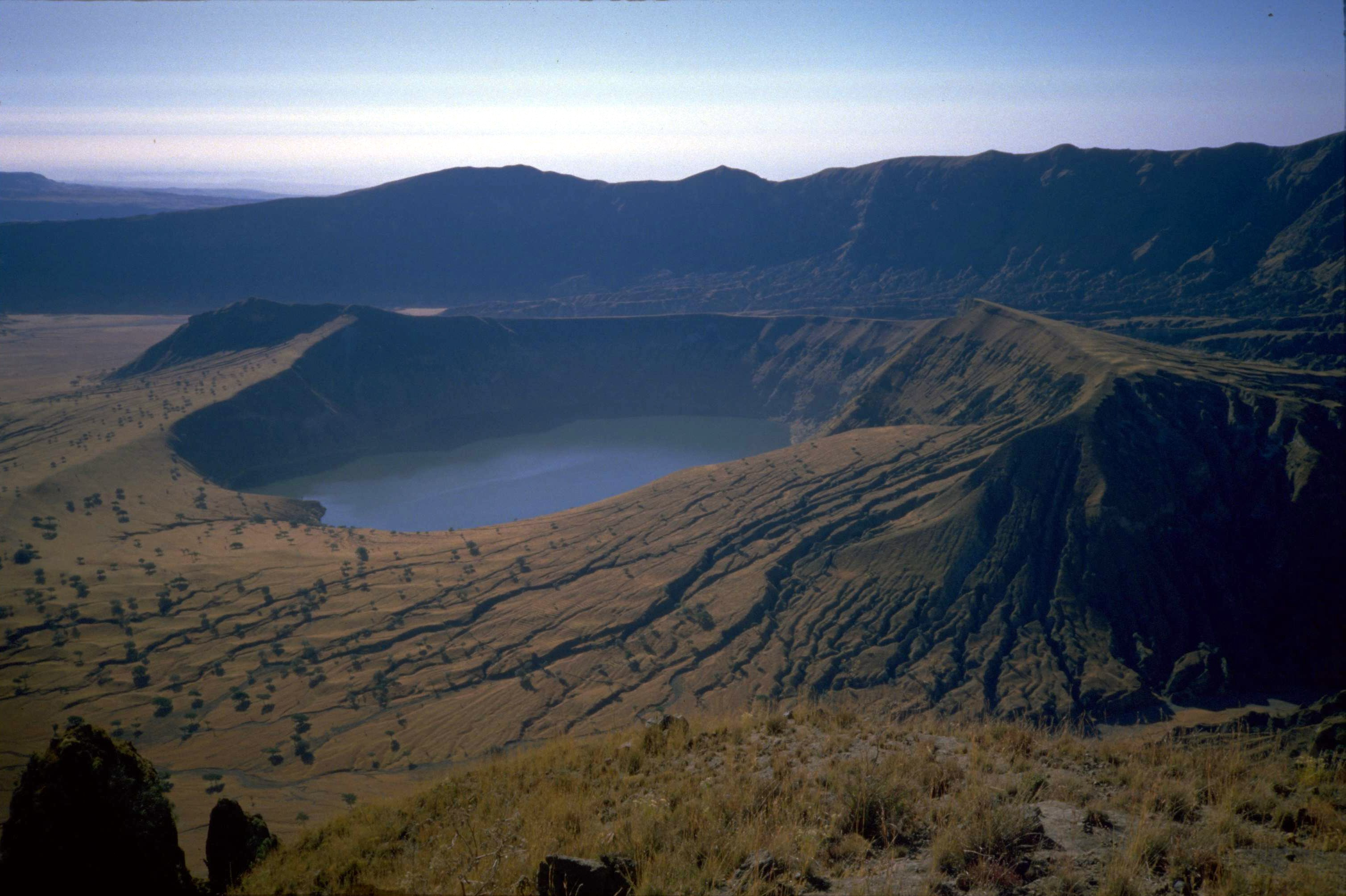
Jebel Marra Deriba Lakes

Central Africa showing CASZ.
