= Midob =

Midob may refer to:

- the Midob people
- the Midob language
