= Berti people =

Ethnic group in Darfur, Sudan

Berti
Total population
- 60,000–80,000 (1985)

Regions with significant populations
- Darfur, Sudan

Languages
- Sudanese Arabic, Berti (extinct)

Religion
- Islam

Related ethnic groups
- Zaghawa

Linguistic map of non-Arabic languages in Darfur, Sudan. The areas where Berti was spoken is shown in four dashed scattered purple pockets.

The Berti people (Arabic: برتي, romanized: birti; Berti: Sigáto) are an ethnic group living in Darfur, Sudan. As of 1985, they numbered 60,000 to 80,000 people. The Berti are Muslims who have spoken their own dialect of Arabic for generations. Unlike their neighbouring ethnic groups, the Fur, Midob and Zaghawa, the Berti are substantially more Arabized, having not preserved their language. The Berti's form of Islam combines orthodox beliefs and practices with elements belonging to the indigenous pre-Islamic religious system.

During the Darfur genocide (2003–2005) they were the target of massacres by the Janjaweed. Many of the 2006 population of 250,000 were forced into refugee camps after the genocide.

In October 2025, the Yale School of Public Health Humanitarian Research Lab (HRL) reported that, following the fall of the city of El Fasher from the control of the Sudanese Armed Forces (SAF) to the Rapid Support Forces (RSF) during the Sudanese civil war, the Berti, Fur and Zaghawa, all indigenous non-Arab communities, appeared to be "in a systematic and intentional process of ethnic cleansing", "through forced displacement and summary execution".

== See also ==
- Berti Hills
