= Deriba (caldera) =

Volcanic formation in Darfur, Sudan

Jebel Marra
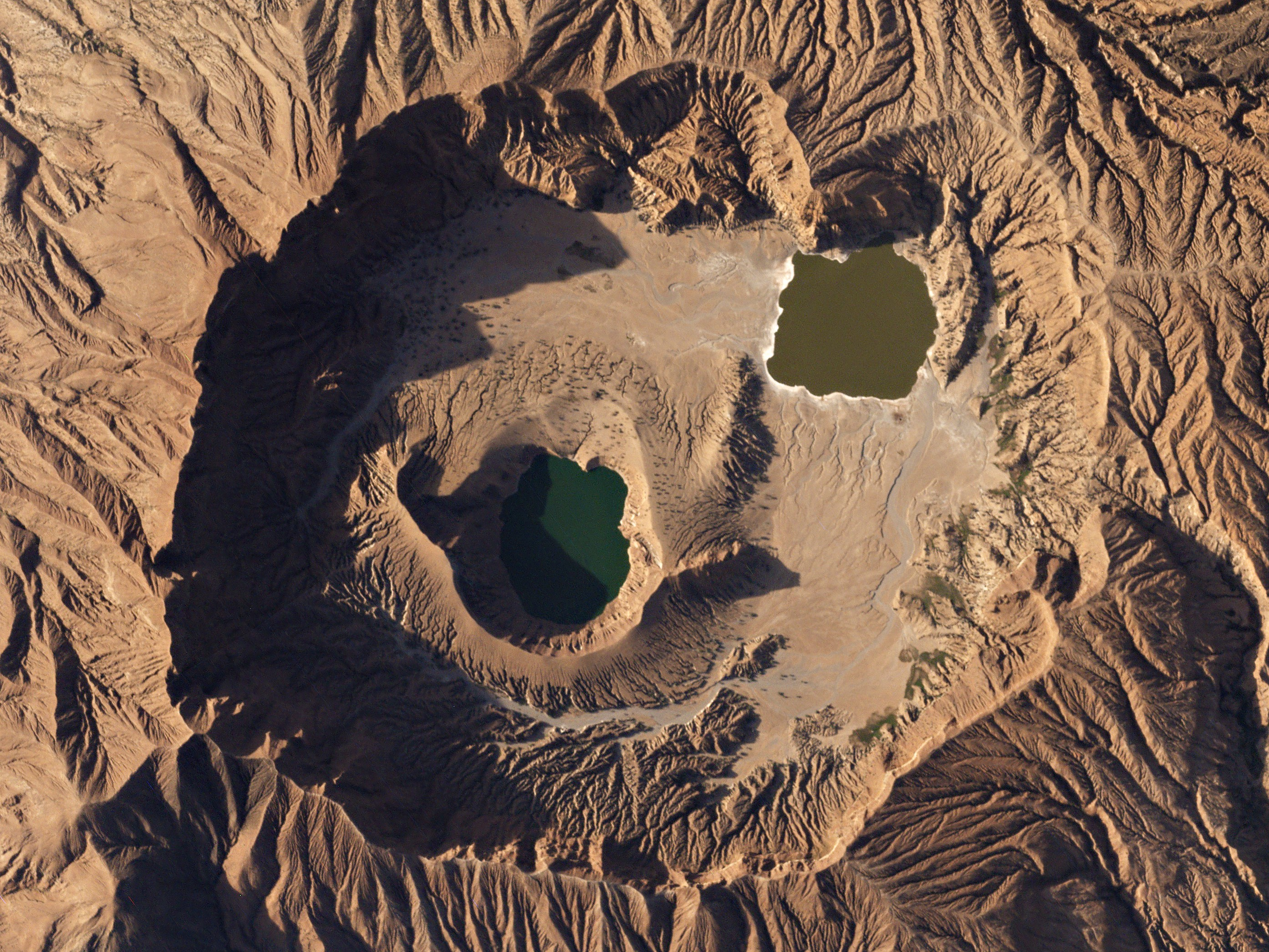
- Deriba caldera, with the two lakes visible

Highest point
- Elevation: 3,042 metres (9,980 ft)
- Listing: Country high point Ultra
- Coordinates: 12.95°N 24.27°E

Geography
- Location within Sudan

Deriba is a Pleistocene or Holocene caldera in Darfur, Sudan. Part of the volcanoes of the Marra Mountains, it lies on the Darfur dome and like the Tagabo Hills and Meidob Hills volcanism may be the product of a mantle plume. After the separation of South Sudan, the highest point of Sudan is on the margin of the caldera.

The caldera lies atop a shield volcano or ash cone in the southern Marra Mountains, which developed first as a pile of basaltic lava flows and later as layers of volcanic ash and tuff, including the eruptions that formed the caldera. A large eruption occurred about 3,520 ± 100 years before present, and hot springs and fumaroles are active to the present day.

Deriba contains two lakes, one in the northeastern side of the main caldera and the other in a cone in the southwestern sector of the Deriba caldera. The fresher southwestern lake is smaller but considerably deeper than the saltier northeastern lake; in the late Pleistocene the caldera was filled with a larger lake.

== Geography and geomorphology ==
Map of the Deriba caldera

Deriba lies in the Marra Mountains of Sudan, Africa's geographic centre; Deriba is in the southern sector of these mountains and close to the main summit thereof. The caldera rim became Sudan's new highest point, after the independence of South Sudan. The town of Nyala lies south of Deriba. The volcano is poorly studied due to the ongoing Darfur conflict.

Deriba is an oval caldera, 4.8 by 6.4 kilometres (3 mi × 4 mi) wide and 500–1,000 metres (1,600–3,300 ft) deep, with a volcanic cone occupying the southwestern part of the caldera floor. At least five overlapping vents form the volcanic cone. The rim of the caldera reaches a maximum elevation of 3,024 metres (9,921 ft) in the southwest, and is steep almost vertical. The caldera is cut into volcanic ash, lapilli, lavas, obsidian and tuffs, and the floor is strewn with pumice blocks. A gap lies in the eastern caldera wall.

=== Lakes ===
Deriba contains two lakes, which are known as the "Deriba lakes". A 11.5-metre-deep (38 ft) lake occupies the northeastern area of the caldera, and being located in the lowest part of the caldera floor it is the sink of Deriba. In 1918 it had dimensions of 1,230 by 1,780 metres (1,350 yd × 1,950 yd), but by 1964 the size of the lake had increased. The lake is surrounded by a gradually sloping muddy beach with the exception of the northern shore. This lake is also known as the "female" lake, with green salty water. The salt consists of chloride, potassium and sodium salts.

The volcanic cone has a lake as well, which is 108 metres (354 ft) deep and smaller, with a roughly rectangular shape that extends in a north-south direction. In comparison to the other lake 1.21 kilometres (0.75 mi) northwest, this "male" lake had dimensions of 820 by 1,420 metres (900 yd × 1,550 yd) in 1918. Steep slopes surround this lake, which is filled with fresher water. Reportedly, the local Fur people considered the lake haunted, but the lakes were also used as a source for salt.

Water levels in these lakes are fairly stable from season to season although evidence for substantial fluctuations have been found that correlate to the regional climate and to fluctuations in the water levels of Lake Chad. Together with several perennial streams they are thus perennial waterbodies. Around the Deriba caldera, drainage occurs either southward or westward, leading into the Bahr El-Arab of the White Nile and the Chari River of Lake Chad respectively. The lakes themselves have no surface outlets.

In the past, larger lakes existed inside the Deriba caldera. The first such lake stage has been dated to 23,000 or 19,000 years before present when water levels rose 25 metres (82 ft) above the present-day levels, the second 19,600–16,000 years before present when they were 8–5 metres (26–16 ft) higher than currently, and the third 14,000 years before present, then 9 metres (30 ft) above present-day. Similar lake stages have been documented in Trou au Natron in Tibesti, where shifts of the position of the subtropical jet stream and the tropical depressions associated with the jet stream have been invoked as an explanation. These lake stages have left shorelines and limestone deposits in the caldera, and it is likely that the lakes sometimes overflowed through the eastern caldera rim gap.

== Geology ==
Deriba is part of the Jebel Marra volcano, which together with the Tagabo Hills and the Meidob Hills is one of three volcanic fields in Darfur; these form the little known Darfur Volcanic Province. The Jebel Marra volcano is maximally 80 kilometres (50 mi) wide and 200 kilometres (120 mi) long in north-south direction, where the northern segment is centered around Jebel Gurgei.

Jebel Marra consists of a pile of mostly basaltic lava which has been covered by pumice and volcanic ash as well as pyroclastic rocks and ignimbrites. The Deriba caldera which forms the top of the entire complex, which around Deriba has the appearance of a large ash cone or shield volcano. Other, less spectacular vents are found elsewhere in the Marra Mountains. Erosion has cut canyons into the volcanic complex. The occurrence of volcanism has been explained with a mantle plume centered between Meidob and Jebel Marra.

The basement is formed by crystalline rocks, mainly metamorphosed gneisses and schists, and is a mobile belt of Panafrican age. They are in part covered by the Nubian Sandstones of Cretaceous age and aeolian sands, and by the Jebel Marra massif which occupies a surface of 13,000 square kilometres (5,000 sq mi). Tectonic uplift of the Darfur dome commenced in the Cretaceous and resulted in a noticeable upwarp of the basement beneath Jebel Marra. Two major tectonic lineaments intersect at Jebel Marra, one trending south-southeastward and the other east-northeastward.

=== Eruptive history ===
Volcanism in the Jebel Marra mountains appears to have begun 15 million years ago and continued in two stages, separated by an erosional period. Volcanism in the southwestern Marra mountains took place between 4.35 million years ago and 60,000 years ago, subdivided into an Old Series and a New Series which is younger than 2 million years ago. After an initial stage, during which olivine basalt and small amounts of pyroclastic material were erupted, trachyte were emplaced. The Deriba caldera probably formed either in the early Pleistocene, 60,000 or 3,520 ± 100 years before present (BP), but activity continued with the volcanic cone inside of the caldera and peripheral vents, possibly into historical time.

The 3,520 ± 100 BP eruption was a Plinian eruption that deposited pyroclastic material containing blocks of basement material. The ash fall from the eruption reaches thicknesses of 20 metres (66 ft) as far as 5 kilometres (3.1 mi) away from Deriba, while pyroclastic flows have been identified as far as 30 kilometres (19 mi) from the caldera. The eruption has an estimated volcanic explosivity index of 4 and may be associated with the volcanic cone inside the caldera. There are no historical records or oral tradition linked to this or other events at Jebel Marra, however.

The volcano was formerly considered to be extinct. Hot springs, whose temperature reaches 65–85 °C (149–185 °F) and which may be supplied by magmatic water, and fumaroles, both within the caldera around the volcanic cone and in the surrounding Marra Mountains, indicate that Jebel Marra and the Deriba caldera are a dormant volcano. Reportedly, the exhalations of the fumaroles can kill birds and insects, and some fumarolic vents may have formed between 1964 and 1966, implying that the fumarolic activity may reflect a recent change of volcanic activity.

== Climate ==
Jebel Marra has a humid subtropical climate (Cwa) bordering on a subtropical highland climate (Cwb). Precipitation on Jebel Marra is about 1,200 millimetres per year (47 in/year), the mountain lies at the eastern margin of the Sahel and receives more precipitation than the surrounding region. Between 12,000 and 8,000 years before present, the climate was wetter as a consequence of a northward shift of climate zones.

== Biology ==
Vegetation above 2,400 metres (7,900 ft) elevation in the Marra Mountains, including around Deriba, consists of man-made grassland with scarce trees such as the wild olive. The plant life is classified as Afromontane, it also includes species from temperate climates. It is likely that past humid periods permitted the expansion of Mediterranean species into the Jebel Marra mountains. Presently, Jebel Marra is a suitable site for agriculture and used as such by the Fur people. Semi-desert and desert landscapes dominate the region around the Marra Mountains.

The lakes are salty, oxygen poor and remote and thus contain little plant or animal life. Some vegetation grows around the smaller lake, as well as in other parts of the Deriba caldera where water is available.

Copepods live in the smaller lake, while the larger one is populated by blue-green algae and rotifers. Spirulina occurs in the large lake, and Melosira and Nitzscia diatoms have been identified in the small lake. The copepod Eucyclops gibsoni has been encountered in the small lake. Among the rotifers are Brachionus dimidiatus, Brachionus plicatilis, Hexarthra jenkinae and Lecane bulla, some of which also occur in the smaller lake. Ephydra flies are widespread around the large lake, and other insects were collected on the small lake. Birds such as greenshanks, little grebes, sacred ibis and stilts are uncommon.

== Gallery ==
Sketch of the Deriba lake looking west

Northeast lake in Deriba, looking west

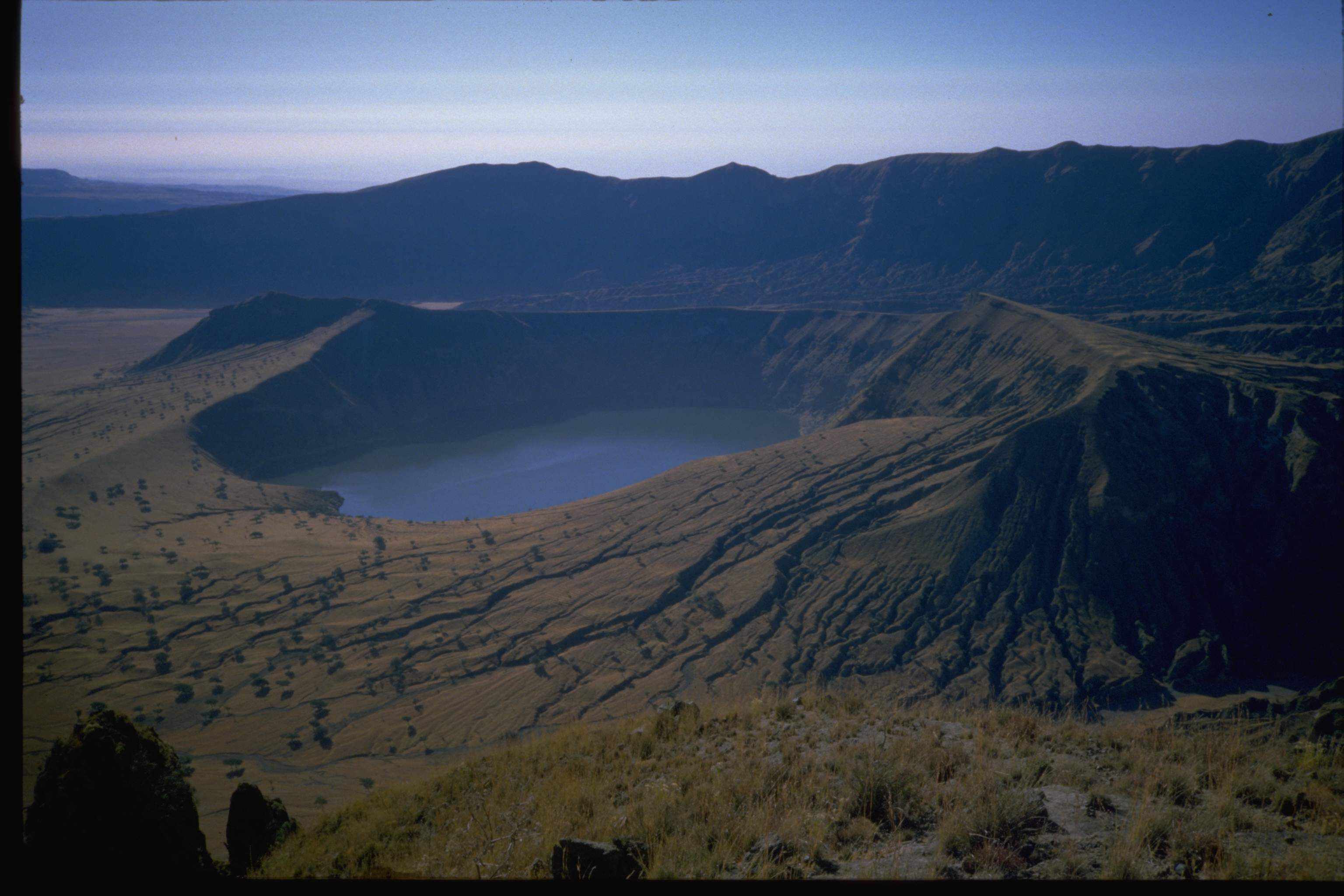
The southwestern lake

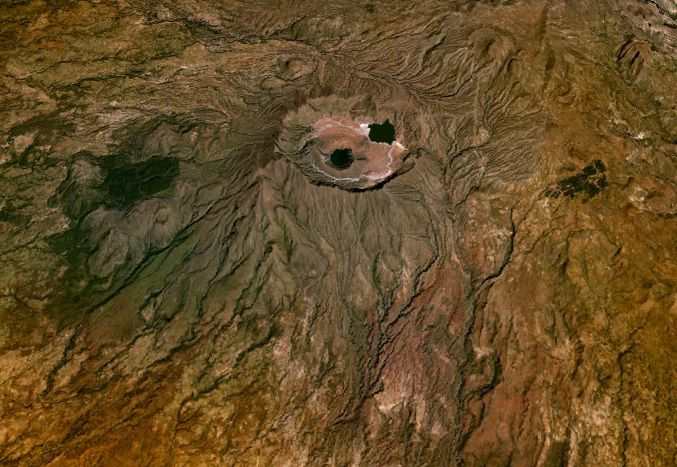
The caldera
