= Berti language =

Extinct Saharan language of Sudan

Berti
- Native to: Sudan
- Region: North Darfur
- Ethnicity: Berti
- Extinct: by 1990s
- Language family: Nilo-Saharan?: Saharan; Eastern; Berti

Language codes
- ISO 639-3: byt
- Glottolog: bert1249

Linguistic map of the non-Arab peoples of Darfur, also showing the former extent of the Berti language.

Berti is an extinct Saharan language that was once spoken by the Berti people in northern Sudan, specifically in the Tagabo Hills, Darfur, and Kurdufan. Berti speakers migrated into the region alongside other Nilo-Saharan speakers, such as the Masalit and Daju, who were agriculturalists with varying levels of animal husbandry. They settled in two separate areas: one group north of Al-Fashir, while the other continued eastward, settling in eastern Darfur and western Kurdufan by the nineteenth century. The two groups did not appear to share a common identity, with the western group notably engaging in the cultivation of gum arabic. By the 1990s, Sudanese Arabic had largely replaced Berti as the native language.

== Phonology ==
Vowels
	Front	Central	Back
Close	i		u
Mid	e		o
Open		a	

== Sources ==
- Petráček, Karel 1965. Die Phonetik, Phonologie und Morphologie der Berti (-Siga) Sprache in Dar Fur. Archiv Orientální, 33 : 341-366.
- Petráček, Karel 1966. Die Morphologie der Berti (-Siga) Sprache in Dar Fur. Archiv Orientální, 34: 295-319.
- Petráček, Karel 1967. Phonologische Systeme der zentralsaharanischen Sprachen (konsonantische Phoneme). Archiv Orientální 35: 26-51.
- Petráček, Karel 1970. Phonologische Systeme der zentralsaharanischen Sprachen (vokalische Phoneme). In: Mélanges Marcel Cohen, réunis par David Cohen. 389-396. The Hague: Mouton,
- Petráček, Karel 1987. Berti or Sagato-a (Saharan) Vocabulary. Afrika und Übersee 70, 163-193.
