= Bayuda Desert =

Subregion of the Sahara Desert

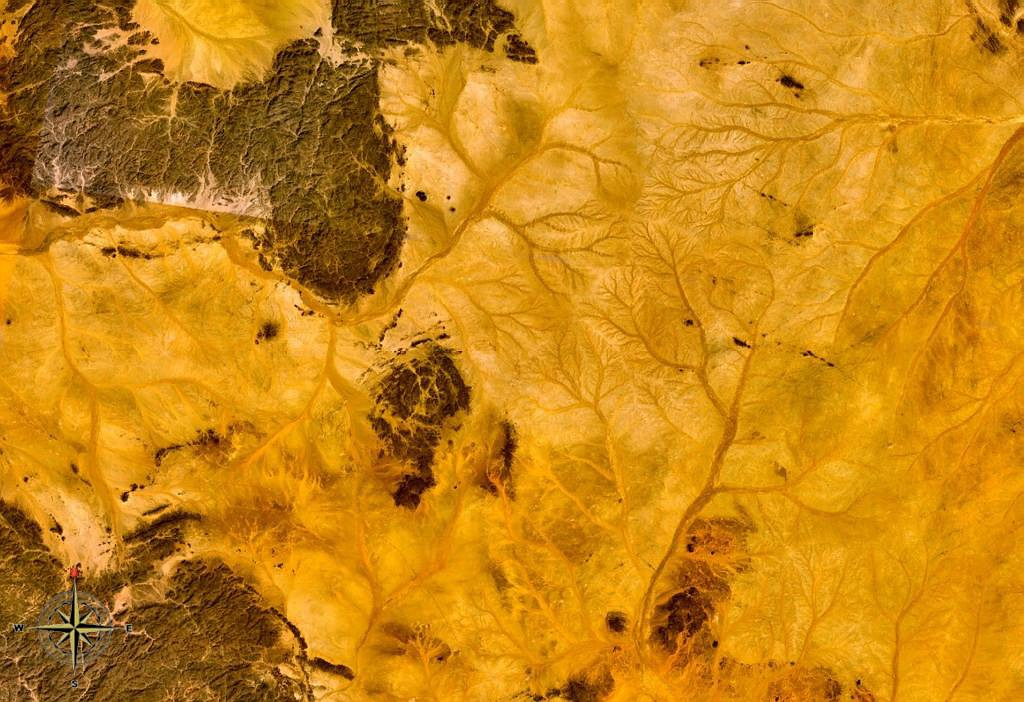
Fragment of Bayuda Desert seen from space

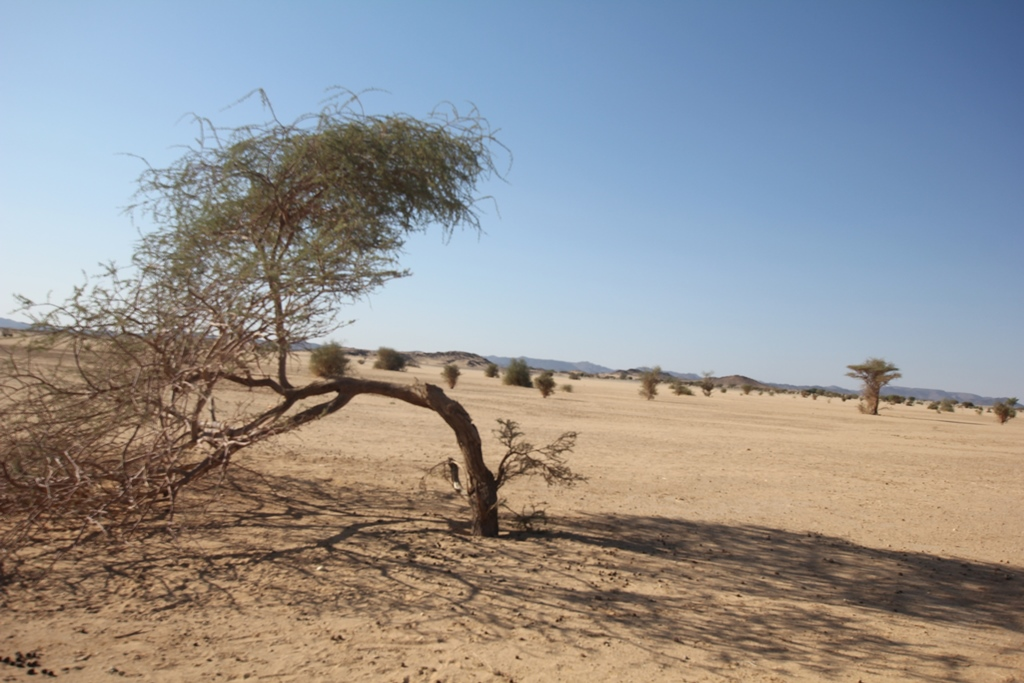
Bayuda desert with some acacian trees

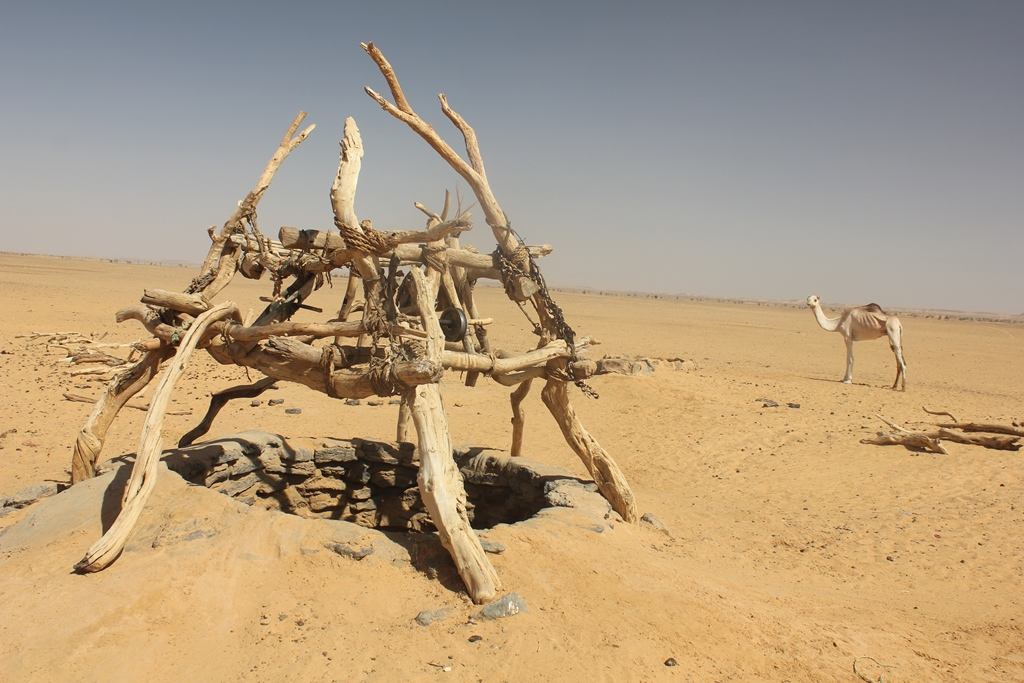
Desert well used by Bisharin nomadic pastoralists

The Bayuda Desert, located at 18°N 33°E, is in the eastern region of the Sahara Desert, spanning approximately 100,000 km^{2} of northeast Sudan north of Omdurman and south of Korti, embraced by the great bend of the Nile in the north, east, and south and limited by the Wadi Muqaddam in the west. The north-to-south-aligned Wadi Abu Dom divides the Bayuda Desert into the eastern Bayuda Volcanic Field and the western ochre-colored sand-sheets scattered with rocky outcrop.

Gold mining occurs today from October to March, as laborers work auriferous quartz found in wadis and shallow mines. These workings are usually in areas previously worked during the New Kingdom of Egypt and the Early Arab Period. In July 2020, it was found that gold hunters had used heavy machinery at the Jabal Maragha archaeological site, destroying it by digging a huge trench. The gold diggers were arrested and their equipment seized, but they were later released without charges.

== The Bayuda Desert route ==
Throughout the Meroitic civilization, the Bayuda Desert became the lifeline connecting the northern and southern districts of the Kingdom of Kush, with Napata and Meroe as the termini. The king Nastasen Stela provides testament of the existence and use of this route, describing his progress across the desert from Meroe to Napata for his coronation.

== The Mahdist War ==
The Bayuda Desert was crossed by the Desert Column of the Gordon Relief Expedition in January 1885 in a failed attempt to relieve the Siege of Khartoum. The Desert Column was led mainly by Major General Sir Herbert Stewart, but after he was mortally wounded, command passed to Brigadier General Charles Wilson, the column's intelligence officer. The Expedition saw the Battle of Abu Klea and the Battle of Abu Kru.
