= Umm Ruweim =

Archaeological site near Ghazali, Sudan

Coordinates: 18.4106°N 31.9903°E

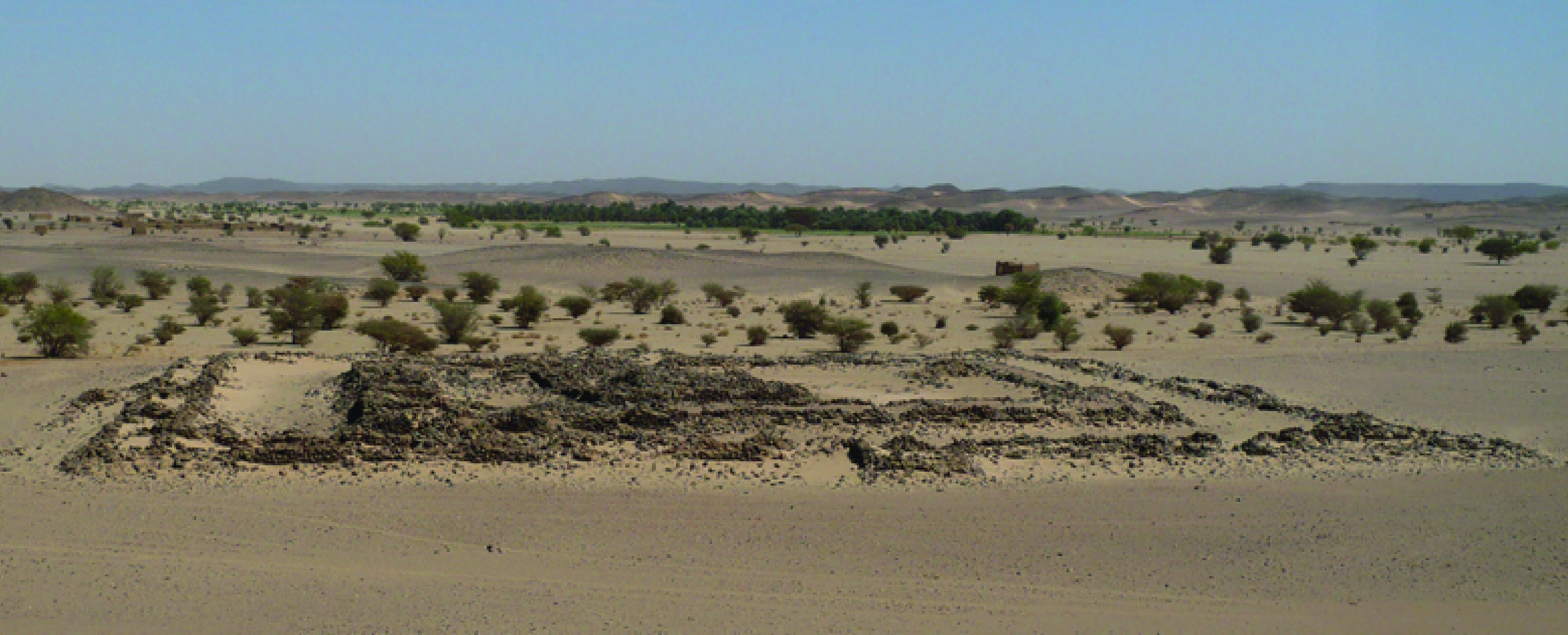
2017 photo of the ruins

Umm Ruweim is an archaeological ruin site 4 kilometres (2.5 mi) from Ghazali in present-day Sudan. Consisting of two forts and some cemeteries, the site is situated just south of the Nile's Fourth Cataract at Wadi Abu Dom. There are two documented forts of the Meroitic period (300 BC to 300 AD). The Umm Ruweim I measures 50 by 50 metres (160 ft × 160 ft) and has four towers. Umm Ruweim II, 400 metres (1,300 ft) to the southeast, has a simpler plan consisting only of a perimeter wall. The function of these forts may have been military, but is uncertain. In the vicinity of the sites, there are small cemeteries that have been partially excavated. Umm Ruweim was unknown until the 50s, when its Christian antiquities were surveyed. An ongoing survey by Angelika Lohwasser of the University of Münster since 2009 in the Wadi Abu Dom area includes documentation of the ruins of Umm Ruweim.
