= Gerald Ernest Wickens =

English botanist (1927–2019)

Gerald Ernest Wickens B.Sc., M.Sc., Ph.D., F.L.S.
- Born: December 18, 1927; Marylebone, London, England
- Died: March 11, 2019 (aged 91); Cromer, Norfolk, England
- Education: Reading University
- Known for: Flora of Jebel Marra (1976); The Baobabs (2008); Economic botany conservation
- Scientific career
- Fields: Botany, Ecology, Economic botany
- Workplaces: Africa Agriculture Department; Hunting Technical Services; Royal Botanic Gardens, Kew
- Thesis: The Flora of Jebel Marra (1972)

Gerald Ernest Wickens B.Sc., M.Sc., Ph.D., F.L.S. (18 December 1927 – 11 March 2019) was a British botanist.

== Biography ==
Gerald Ernest Wickens was born in Marylebone in 1927 and attended Ealing County High School. Following army service (1946–1948) he followed a career in agriculture and conservation in Africa. He served in the Africa Agriculture Department from 1952 and joined Hunting Technical Services (1962–1966) in Sudan where he was team leader and ecologist for a study of Jebel Marra, an isolated massif.

In 1967 he worked at the Herbarium at Kew Gardens, continuing to work on African plants, especially Combretaceae, Melastomataceae and Crassulaceae. He was awarded a Ph.D. from Reading University in 1972 for his theses "The Flora of Jebel Marra". In 1981 worked on the Survey of Economic Plants for Arid and Semi-Arid Tropics (SEPASAT). From 1983 he headed the Economic and Conservation Section of the Herbarium (ECOS), which included directing the cataloguing of the Economic Botany collection, rehousing from the museums to the Sir Joseph Banks building, digitisation of the Kew Economic Botany Bibliographic Database and also managing the Conservation Policy team including CITES.

He published over 120 scientific papers and is noted particularly for the Flora of Jebel Marra (1976) and The Baobabs (2008).

He married his wife Susan (Mimi Stammers, b 1937), who worked in the Library at Kew, in Richmond Catholic Church (1969) and had a son, David (b 1970). He retired in 1987 and moved to Aylsham in Norfolk, where he died 2019 in Cromer.

== Selected publications ==
- Flora of Tropical East Africa : Melastomataceae. (1975). Royal Botanic Gardens. ISBN 9781842462850
- Flora of Jebel Marra (Sudan Republic) and its Geographical Affinities. (1976). Royal Botanic Gardens
- Baobab - Africa's Upside-Down Tree. (1982)
- Economic Botany: Principles and Practices Hardcover. (2001)
- Checklist of the British and Irish Basidiomycota. (2005). G. E. Wickens, N. W. Legon, A. Henrici, P. J. Roberts, B. M. Spooner, R. Watling, Royal Botanic Gardens. ISBN 9781842461211
- The Baobabs: The Pachycauls of Africa, Madagascar and Australia. (2008). Gerald E. Wickens, Pat Lowe
- Ecophysiology of Economic Plants in Arid and Semi-Arid Lands (Adaptations of Desert Organisms). (2010)
