= List of Intangible Cultural Heritage elements in Sudan =

Location of Sudan

The United Nations Educational, Scientific and Cultural Organization (UNESCO) defines intangible cultural heritage (Arabic: التراث الثقافي غير المادي) elements as non-physical traditions and practices performed by a people. As part of a country's cultural heritage, they include celebrations, festivals, performances, oral traditions, music, and the making of handicrafts. The term intangible cultural heritage is formally established by the Convention for the Safeguarding of the Intangible Cultural Heritage, which was drafted in 2003 and took effect in 2006. The inscription of new heritage elements on UNESCO's Intangible Cultural Heritage Lists for protection and safeguarding is determined by the Intergovernmental Committee for the Safeguarding of Intangible Cultural Heritage, an organization established by the convention. Sudan ratified the convention on 19 June 2008.

National lists are required by the convention for the further nomination of elements to the UNESCO lists.

== Intangible Cultural Heritage of Humanity ==
UNESCO's Intangible Cultural Heritage of Humanity consists of three lists: the Representative List of the Intangible Cultural Heritage of Humanity, the List of Intangible Cultural Heritage in Need of Urgent Safeguarding, and the Register of Good Safeguarding Practices. Sudan only has elements inscribed on the Representative List.

† Transnational element

=== Representative List ===
This list aims to represent the intangible cultural heritage of Sudan worldwide and bring awareness to its significance.

Intangible Cultural Heritage elements recognized by UNESCO
Name	Media	Year	No.	Description
Arabic calligraphy: knowledge, skills and practices † (Note: Shared with Algeria, Bahrain, Egypt, Iraq, Jordan, Kuwait, Lebanon, Morocco, Oman, Palestine, Saudi Arabia, Mauritania, Tunisia, United Arab Emirates, and Yemen.)	Palestinian calligraphy on a ceramic tile	2021	01718	Arabic calligraphy is the practice of transforming and stretching the letters of the Arabic alphabet to convey numerous motifs. It was originally developed to make writing easily understandable and gradually came to be included in marble and wood carving, embroidery, and metal etching, among other art forms. Traditionally the writing instrument, known as the Qalam, is made from bamboo stems and reeds. The ink is created using honey, black soot, and saffron. The handmade paper is treated with starch, egg white and alum. More modern forms use markers, synthetic paint, and spray paint. It is passed down both informally and formally, through schools and apprenticeships.
Date palm, knowledge, skills, traditions and practices † (Note: Shared with Bahrain, Egypt, Iraq, Jordan, Kuwait, Morocco, Oman, Palestine, Qatar, Saudi Arabia, Mauritania, Tunisia, United Arab Emirates, and Yemen.)	Date harvesting using black bags in Jericho	2022	01902	Many historically significant cultural practices associated with the Date palm have been fostered in the Arab world due to the date's sustenance. These range from the cultivation and care of date palms, to the use of it in social customs, and cultural references in song and poetry. Due to this significance, many government agencies and local communities have bolstered the date palm's cultivation and related processing work.
Arts, skills and practices associated with engraving on metals (gold, silver and copper) † (Note: Shared with Algeria, Egypt, Iraq, Morocco, Palestine, Saudi Arabia, Mauritania, Tunisia, and Yemen.)		2023	01951	Metals such as gold, silver and copper have been engraved for centuries. Using various tools, symbols, names, Quran verses, prayers and geometric patterns are cut into the metals. The meanings and uses of the engraved metals will vary by community. However, they can be used for jewelry, household objects, wedding gifts, traditional medicine, and in religious ceremonies. The engraving techniques are taught by family members, although they can also be passed down through formal means—such as universities, workshops, organizations and organizations—as well as informal ones like cultural events, publications, and social media.
Procession and celebrations of Prophet Mohammed's birthday in Sudan		2023	01896	
Henna, rituals, aesthetic and social practices † (Note: Shared with Algeria, Saudi Arabia, Bahrain, Egypt, United Arab Emirates, Iraq, Jordan, Kuwait, Mauritania, Morocco, Oman, Palestine, Qatar, Tunisia, and Yemen.)	A Palestinian woman showing her henna-covered hand.	2024	02116	Derived from a deciduous tree, henna is a paste used for temporary adornments on the body, usually the hands and feet. The tree is considered sacred in North African and Middle Eastern communities, sometimes being used in traditional medicine. the leaves are harvested twice a year and processed to create a paste. Songs, proverbs, poems, and other practices are tied with the tradition of using henna.
Al-Jertiq: practices, rituals and expressions for preservation, protection, abundance and fertility in Sudan		2025	02275	

== See also ==
- List of World Heritage Sites in Sudan
- Culture of Sudan
- Tourism in Sudan
