= Jebel Umm Arafieb =

Mountain in Sudan

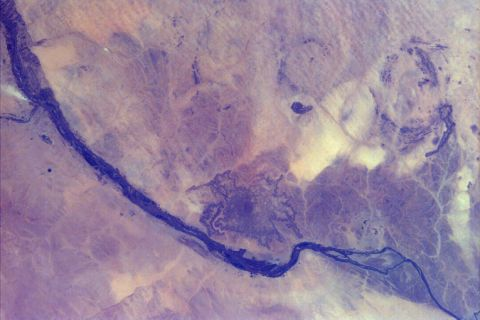

Highest point
- Coordinates: 18°10′0″N 33°50′0″E

Geography
- Location within Sudan
- Location: Khartoum

Geology
- Rock age: Holocene?
- Mountain type: Shield Volcano
- Last eruption: Unknown

Jebel Umm Arafieb is a volcanic field in Sudan, also known as Jebel Umm Marafieb.
