= Midob language =

Nubian language spoken in Sudan

Midob
- Meidob
- tìdn-áal / تِدْن آل
- Native to: Sudan
- Region: North Darfur
- Ethnicity: Midob
- Native speakers: 93,000 (2022)
- Language family: Nilo-Saharan?: Eastern Sudanic; Northern Eastern; Nubian; Western; Midob
- Dialects: Uurti; Shalkota; Kaageddi

Language codes
- ISO 639-3: mei
- Glottolog: mido1240

Linguistic map of the non-Arab peoples of Darfur.

Midob (also spelt Meidob) is a Nubian language spoken by the Midob people of North Darfur region of Sudan. As a Nubian language, it is part of the wider Nilo-Saharan language family.

Apart from in their homeland of Malha, North Darfur, Midob speakers also live in the Khartoum area (primarily in Omdurman and the Gezira region) and Jezirat Aba. The Midob people call their language tìd-n-áal, literally "mouth of the Midob", and themselves tìddí (singular), tìd (plural). There are an estimated 50,000 Midob speakers in two main dialects, Urrti and Kaageddi. Rilly (2010:162) lists the dialects of Urrti, Shalkota, and Torti. Only Uurti has been described in detail.

Recent research on Midob has been done by Thelwall (1983) and Werner (1993). Both studies concerned the Urrti dialect.

== Phonology ==
The following tables show the phonological consonants and vowels without phonetic variations and without more recent Arabic loans.

=== Vowels ===
i, ii		u, uu
e, ee	ə, əə	o, oo
	a, aa	

Note: All vowels occur long and short. The mid central vowel ə only appears in Midob, not in other Nubian languages.

=== Consonants ===
		Bilabial	Alveolar	Palatal	Velar	Glottal
Stop	voiceless	p	t	c	k	
Stop	voiced	b	d	ɟ	g	
Fricative		f	s	ʃ		h
Nasal		m	n	ɲ	ŋ	
Approximant		w	l	j		
Trill			r			

=== Tone ===
Midob is a tonal language with two registers: High and Low. Tone is both lexical and grammatical.

Lexical tone
àadí	we (exclusive)
áadí	stick
àadì	light

Grammatical tone
ná	you (sgl obj)
nà	him, her

== Grammar ==
Midob is an agglutinative language, like the other Nubian languages. The default word order is SOV.

=== Verb ===
The verbs consist of:

verbal stem ( + extension ) + tense/aspect.

The stem is not altered. Extensions modify or add meaning to the verb like negation, intention, affirmation, completed action, plurality of subject–object or action, durative, habitual and sometimes can be combined (especially negation).

=== Tense and aspect ===
Midob has two basic tenses (Perfect and Continuous) plus Intentional. There are sets of suffixes for indicative, subjunctive and two question forms (to ask for a fact, i.e. "When/Why..." and to verify a fact, i.e. "Did you...").

Sets of personal endings:

	Indicative	Subjunctive	Question1	Question2
Perfect	x	x	x	x
Continuous	x	x	x	x
Intentional	x	–	–	–
