= Jebel Dair =

Mountain in Sudan

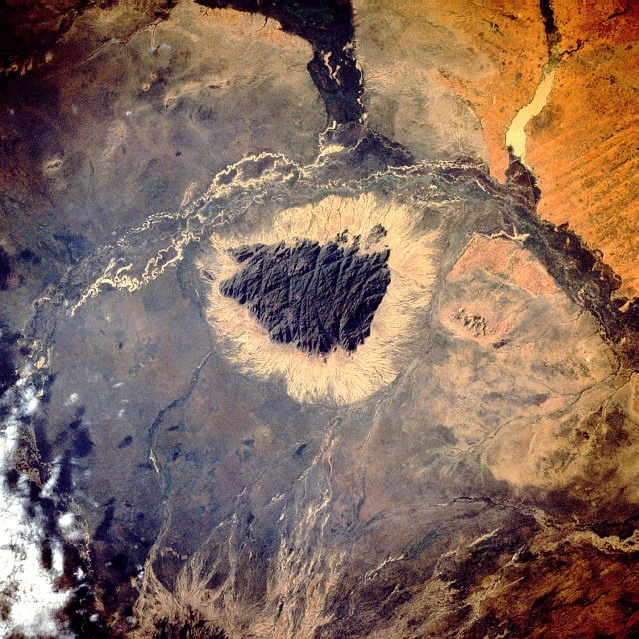

Highest point
- Elevation: 1,451 m (4,760 ft)
- Coordinates: 12°26′N 30°39′E

Geography
- Location within Sudan
- Location: North Kordofan, Sudan

Jebel Dair (also Jabal ad-Dayr or Dair Mountain) (Arabic: جبل الدائر) is an igneous mountain in the Er Rahad locality in the state of North Kordofan, in central Sudan. It rises over 1000m above the surrounding terrain and 1451m above sea level. The flanks of the mountain apparently have been denuded of vegetation, although water exists in some of the meandering stream channels within the darker, vegetated wadis.

It can be seen as the dark, fractured structure near the center of the photograph to the right. The mountain flanks are the broad reddish-tan ring around it. A small muddy reservoir can be seen near the northwest corner of the photograph, and sand dunes to the northwest.

With the exception of Jebel Dair, most of the surrounding region is fairly flat. It is hot and semiarid, and marginally suited for subsistence agriculture, as well as for commercial crops of peanuts, sesame, and gum arabic. Drainage patterns dominate the landscape in central Sudan west of the White Nile River. Several major wadis, intermittently flowing watercourses, merge west and northwest of the mountain. The sand dunes nearby capture the wide variation in annual precipitation in the region, which makes agricultural activity tenuous.
