= Wadi Abu Dom =

Valley in Sudan with archaeological sites

Coordinates: 18.4106°N 31.9903°E

Wadi Abu Dom is an arid valley in Sudan. Situated in the Bayuda Desert, it runs from the central Bayuda approximately 150 km down to the Nile. Several archaeological sites, e.g. Umm Ruweim and the monastery of Ghazali are located at Wadi Abu Dom. In 2011, rock art, some of which is at least 5,000 years old, was discovered at 15 sites.
