= Websterite =

Pyroxenite with clino and orthopyroxene

- Igneous rock
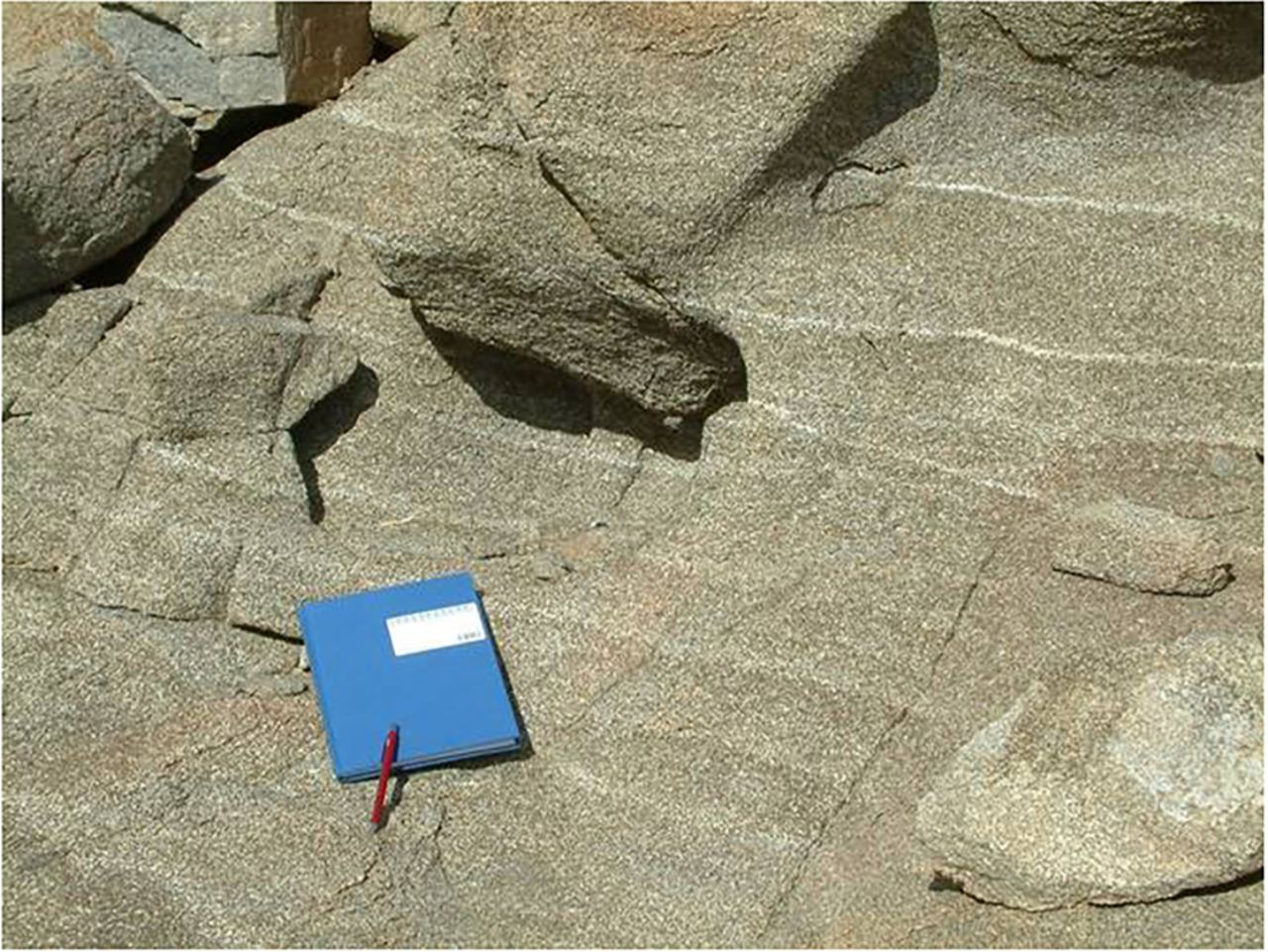
- Cumulate layers of websterite in the McMurdo Dry Valleys in Antarctica.

Composition
- Classification: Ultramafic
- Primary: clinopyroxene and orthopyroxene
- Secondary: olivine, hornblende, spinel, chromite, garnet, anorthite
- Texture: Phaneritic

Websterite is ultramafic igneous rock, a type of pyroxenite that has less than 5% olivine and roughly equal proportions of orthopyroxene and clinopyroxene.

Websterite highlighted in a ternary diagram

Websterite is named after the town Webster in North Carolina.
