= Midob people =

Nubian ethnic group in western Sudan

Linguistic map of the non-Arab peoples of Darfur.

The Midob people or Meidob are an ethnic group from the Meidob Hills region in Darfur, Sudan. They speak Midob, one of the Nubian languages which is a part of the larger family of Nilo-Saharan languages. The population of this ethnic group was 50,000 in 1984.

== Culture ==
The Midob have historically engaged in pastoralism and raising livestock, raising animals such as sheep, camels, goats and cattle. They also cultivate sorghum and several types of vegetables to sustain themselves.

The Midob are Muslim. Islam first appeared in the region in the 17th century though most of the Midob seemed to have only converted in the 19th century.

The Midob were notable for being matrilineal, a rare practice among the peoples of the Darfur region. The practice seems to have declined in modern times.
