= Tagabo Hills =

Volcanic field in Western Sudan

- Location within Sudan

Highest point
- Coordinates: 14°34′N 25°51′E

Geography
- Location: Darfur, Sudan

Geology
- Mountain type: volcanic field
- Last eruption: Holocene(?)

The Tagabo Hills is a volcanic field in the region of Darfur in Sudan. It lies north of the Marrah Mountains and southwest of the larger Meidob Volcanic Field. The Tagabo Hills are also known as the Kutum Volcanic Field, after the town of Kutum, or the Berti Hills after the Berti people. It contains well-preserved features, such as scoria cones, thought to be of the late Pleistocene or even as recent as the Holocene. However, a 1997 analysis ascribed the rocks only to the Paleogene/Neogene periods.

== See also ==
- List of volcanoes in Sudan
- List of volcanic fields
