= Meidob volcanic field =

Volcanic field in Darfur, Sudan

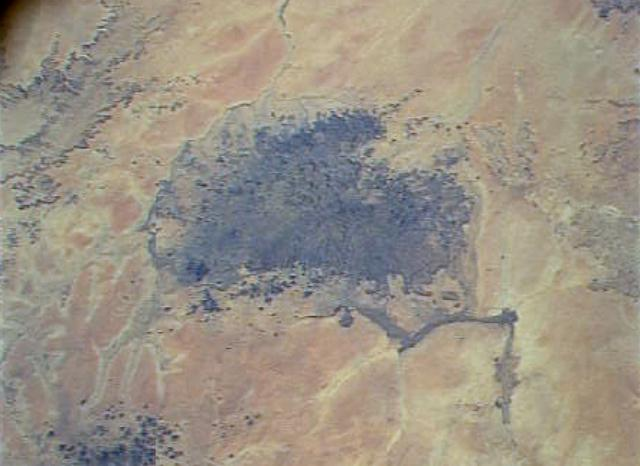
- The Meidob volcanic field seen from space

Highest point
- Coordinates: 15.32°N 26.47°E

Geography
- Location within Sudan

Meidob volcanic field is a Holocene volcanic field in Darfur, Sudan. It is one of several volcanic fields in Africa whose origin is explained by the activity of mantle plumes and their interaction with crustal structures. Meidob lies at the southern margin of the Sahara.

The volcanic field is formed by overlapping lava flows, which cover an area of 100 by 50 kilometres (62 mi × 31 mi) and emanate from about 700 vents, mainly scoria cones. Lava domes, pyroclastic fall and pyroclastic flow deposits are also common. Among the vents is the Malha crater, which presently contains a small lake. The volcanic field has erupted rocks ranging from basanite to trachyte and rises from a tectonic uplift known as the Darfur dome.

Volcanic activity in Meidob began 6.8 million years ago and continued into the Holocene, with the most recent eruptions dated to 4,900 ± 520 years ago. There are no geothermal manifestations at Meidob, but legends of the local people imply that they witnessed volcanic eruptions in the field.

== Name ==
The term "Meidob" is derived from a Nubian language where peida means "slave". It is also a misspelling of "Midob", such as in "Meidob people" which is actually Midob people. The Midob people live in the Meidob hills area.

== Geography and geomorphology ==
The Meidob volcanic field lies in northern Darfur and is part of northern Sudan. The towns of Bir Harra, Ein Basoro and Malha are near the volcanic field, while El Fasher is 220 kilometres (140 mi) south-southwest from it. The Meidob volcanic field is one among several volcanic fields in northern Africa, such as Al-Haruj, Cameroon Line, Hoggar, Jebel Marra and Tibesti, some of which are considered to be part of a northeast-trending volcanic province.

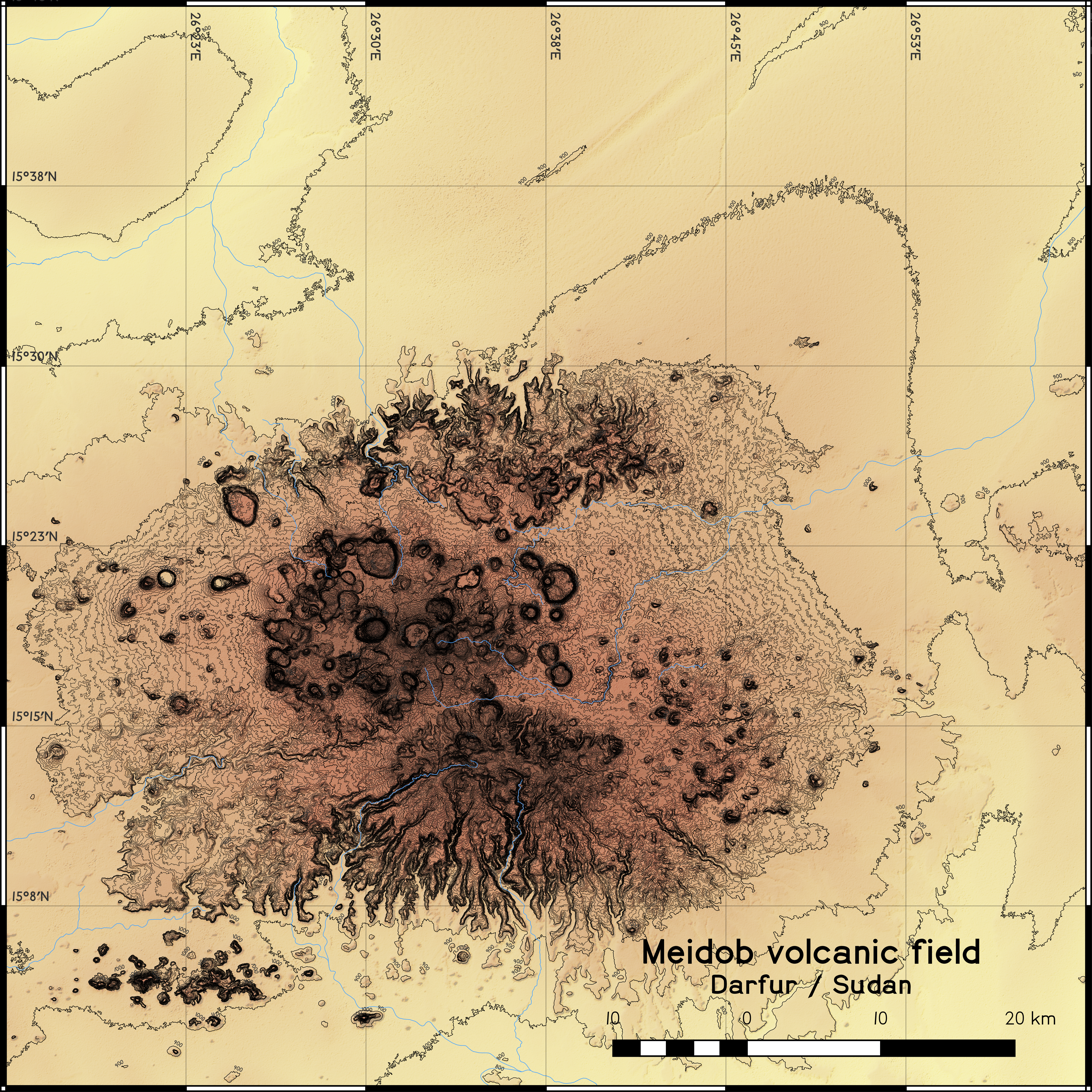
Topographic map of the Meidob volcanic field

Meidob is a volcanic field which covers an area of 100 by 50 kilometres (62 mi × 31 mi) in east–west direction. The field consists of cones and lava flows, which form a 400-metre (1,300 ft) thick pile in the middle of the field in the form of a plateau. The central area lies at higher elevations than the peripheral parts of the volcanic field and its maximum elevation is 1,800 metres (6,000 ft). It features fallout and pyroclastic flow deposits in addition to cones and lava flows. Ignimbrites occur in some places.

The lava flows are between several metres to several tens of metres thick and reach lengths of more than 20 kilometres (12 mi). The less eroded lava flows have surface features typical of aa lava and pahoehoe lava. Other lava flows constitute so-called "mesa" flows (Note: Or lava domes.) such as Jebel Arfinur and Jebel Sireir, which are characterized by oval or circular shapes and steep flanks.

The field has about 700 vents such as lava domes, maars, mesas, tuff rings and most commonly scoria cones. The scoria cones are typically about 80 metres (260 ft) high and 500–1,500 metres (1,600–4,900 ft) wide at their base. Many lava flows originate in a scoria cone.

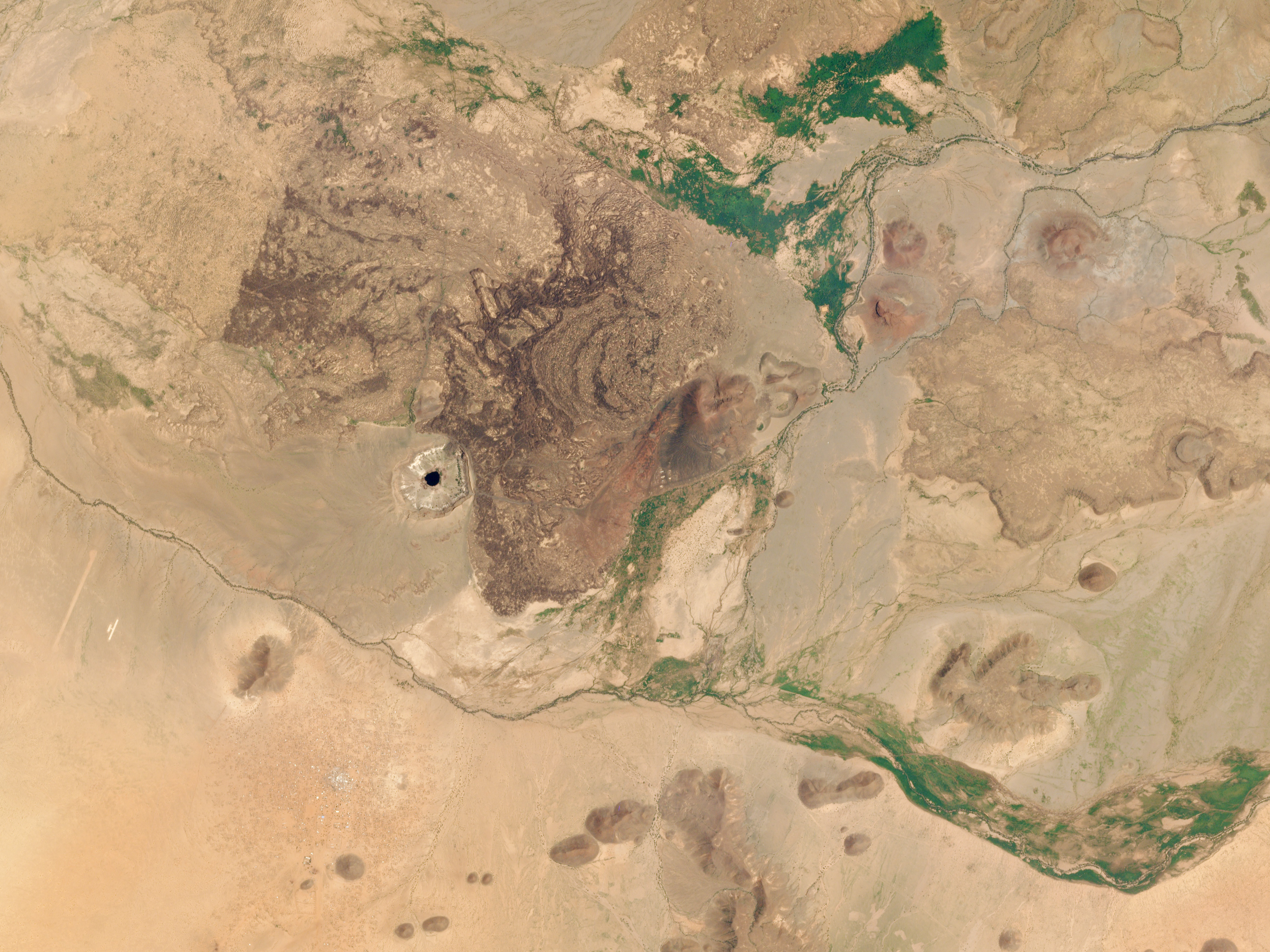
Southwestern corner of the Meidob volcanic field; dark spot left of centre is the lake in the Malha crater

About thirty maars and craters are found in the field, including the Malha crater (15°8′N 26°10′E). Malha is a crater about 150 metres (490 ft) deep and c. 1,050 metres (3,440 ft) wide. It has been excavated into the basement rock beneath the volcanic field, and is itself surrounded by a rim less than 30 metres (100 ft) high.

Malha contains a salty lake in the middle and several springs fed by an aquifer, and in the northeast side of the Malha crater a lava flow of the Jebel Sowidor lava field has invaded the crater depression. There are other deep and wide craters in the field besides Malha.

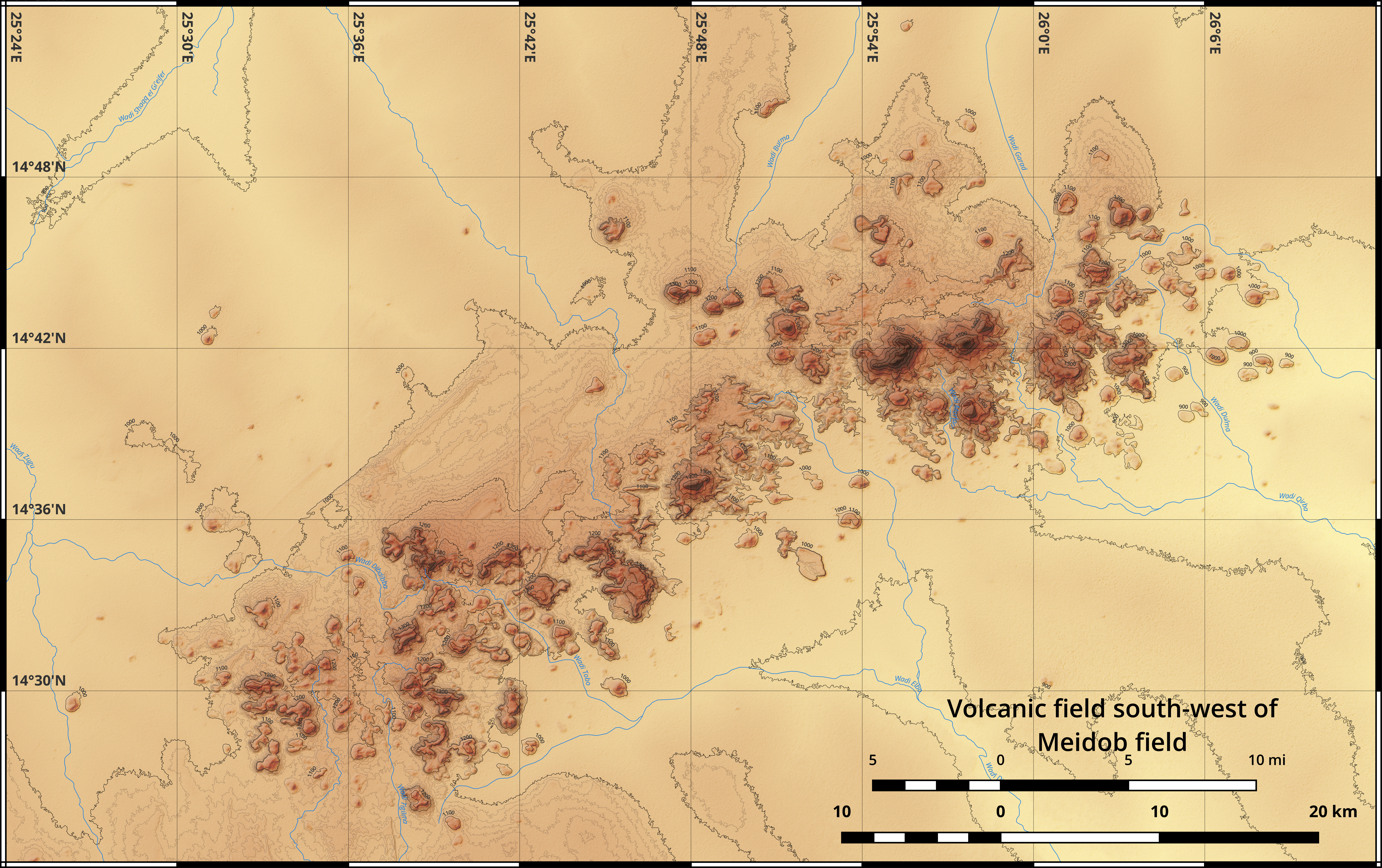
Topographic map of the volcanic field south-west of Meidob

=== Hydrology ===
The southwestern and northern side of the Meidob volcanic field drain into the Wadi Harra and subsequently into the Wadi Magrur, which flows northeastward when it carries water. In the present day most of the wadis draining the Meidob northeastward such as Wadi Umm Afarit end in inland deltas, in past wet periods they reached the Wadi Magrur. In turn, Wadi Magrur discharged into Wadi Howar, leading to the development of wetlands.

== Geology ==
Mantle plumes and rifting processes are responsible for volcanism in northern Africa; in the case of the Darfur dome volcanic fields such as Jebel Marra, Meidob and Tagabo Hills the most likely explanation is a mantle plume. The location of the volcanism triggered by this plume would be controlled more by the tectonic stress field than by the slow movement of the African Plate, explaining why volcanism began between Jebel Marra and Meidob and then continued in these two fields, which are at opposite sides of the dome.

Alternatively, an origin as an intracontinental triple junction has also been proposed but it has been contested on because of a lack of evidence supporting it. Other proposals include the presence of laccoliths. Volcanism elsewhere in northeast Africa has also been attributed to the Red Sea Rift and the Afar hotspot.

=== Local ===
Jebel Marra and Meidob lie on an uplifted basement known as the Darfur dome, which consists of various igneous and metamorphic rocks of Precambrian age, Neoproterozoic greenschists and Paleozoic-Mesozoic sandstones including the Nubian Sandstones. These rocks in Meidob are concealed beneath recent volcanic rocks, but eruptions in the field have carried large blocks of basement rock to the surface, and the sediments are exposed in craters such as the Malha crater.

The Meidob volcanic field and Jebel Marra with their Holocene eruptions are younger than the Jebel Kussa and Tagabo Hills, which are of Oligocene-Pleistocene and Miocene age respectively. Erosion has exposed their subvolcanic features. The oldest volcanic activity in the region has been dated to 36 million years ago at Jebel Kussa.

Tectonic lineaments control both the position of vents and that of dry valleys in the field. There are both northeast–southwest, east–west and northwest–southeast trends, in order of decreasing importance. These lineaments have been active at different times, indicating changes in the regional tectonic stress field.

=== Composition ===
The Meidob volcanic field has erupted basalt, basanite, hawaiite as well as benmoreite, mugearite, phonolite and trachyte, forming an alkaline suite of volcanic rocks. Various types of xenoliths are present in the eruption products, while phenocrysts include aegirine, amphibole, anorthoclase, augite, biotite, ulvospinel-magnetite, nepheline olivine, augitic-diopsidic pyroxene and sanidine.

The total volume of erupted rocks is about 1,400–1,800 cubic kilometres (340–430 cu mi), which was erupted at rates per millennium of 0.2–0.5 cubic kilometres (0.05–0.12 mi^{3}). Basalt and basanite lava flows make up most of the erupted material. Pyroclastics and lava flows of phonolitic and trachytic composition form the "mesa" flows and are concentrated in the central part of the field. The more differentiated rocks are prevalent in the more recent rocks.

Basanite is a product of mantle melts, which may involve a lithospheric component. Fractionation processes in deep magma chambers and assimilation of crustal materials have been used to explain the genesis of differentiated magmas from the basanitic precursor, with additional processes generating the basaltic and hawaiitic magmas.

== Climate and vegetation ==
Average yearly temperatures at Malha range between 21 and 29 °C (70 and 84 °F). The Meidob volcanic field lies at the southern margin of the Sahara to the Sahel, with precipitation at Malha amounting to 170 millimetres per year (6.7 in/year) mostly during summer months. During the early Holocene between 6,000 and 12,000 years ago, precipitation was considerably higher and orographic precipitation in the Meidob area may have supplied water to their surroundings.

The lava fields are mostly barren, with the vegetation of the Meidob volcanic field consisting of grasses and scrubs. Woodland grows along the course of wadis and sometimes within craters.

== Eruption history ==
The oldest volcanic rocks in the Meidob volcanic field have been dated by potassium-argon dating, yielding ages of 6.8 ± 0.2 and 6.5 ± 0.2 million years ago. The Jebel Sireif vent has yielded ages of 1.3 ± 0.4 to 0.6 ± 0.2 million years ago. Volcanism at first took the form of lava emissions. Later, during the Pliocene to Holocene, it was dominated by pyroclastics and lavas.

The field has been active during the Holocene, with thermoluminescence and tephrochronology dating giving a series of eruptions at the following dates (years ago):

- 14,600 ± 6,600 to 12,200 ± 3,300
- 10,100 ± 1,400 at Malha crater (Note: However, a lava flow that enters this crater has yielded dates older than this.)
- 8,000 ± 1,600 to 7,200 ± 720
- 6,170 ± 1,450
- possibly 5,070 and 5,020
- 4,900 ± 520

One of these recent eruptions had an intensity similar to a Plinian eruption, and a volcanic explosivity index of 4 has been assigned to some eruptions.

There are no fumaroles in the field, while hot springs may or may not exist; but legends of the Midob recall that many generations ago, fire erupted from the Malha crater, and that water levels within its lake underwent changes accompanied by sounds. These legends may reflect recent volcanic activity.

=== Non-volcanic history ===
Apart from volcanism, aeolian processes and water erosion were active in Meidob, producing widespread sedimentary covers especially at the margins of the field. A number of wadis extend radially away from the centre of the Meidob volcanic field and carry water during flash floods, transporting sediment and floating pumice. Winds transport sediments onto old lava flows and volcanic landforms, but owing to its youth many landforms of the Midob volcanic field are little eroded.

During the early and middle Holocene a number of craters contained lakes; some of these have left diatomite sediments and were populated by ostracods living in freshwater. The formation of these lakes began about 12,100 years before present, at Malha 8,290 before present. At Malha to episodes of partial or complete dry-up occurred, the first about 7,000 years before present and the second 2,300 - 2,200 years before present. Today only Malha crater still contains a body of water.

== Human use ==
The Meidob volcanic field was likely used as a source of obsidian, and the Fur people obtained salt from the Malha crater. This crater is an oasis and was also a source of water for the Midob people.

== See also ==
- List of volcanic fields
