= Jebel Marra =

Range of volcanic peaks in Sudan

Marrah Mountains
- Jebel Marra
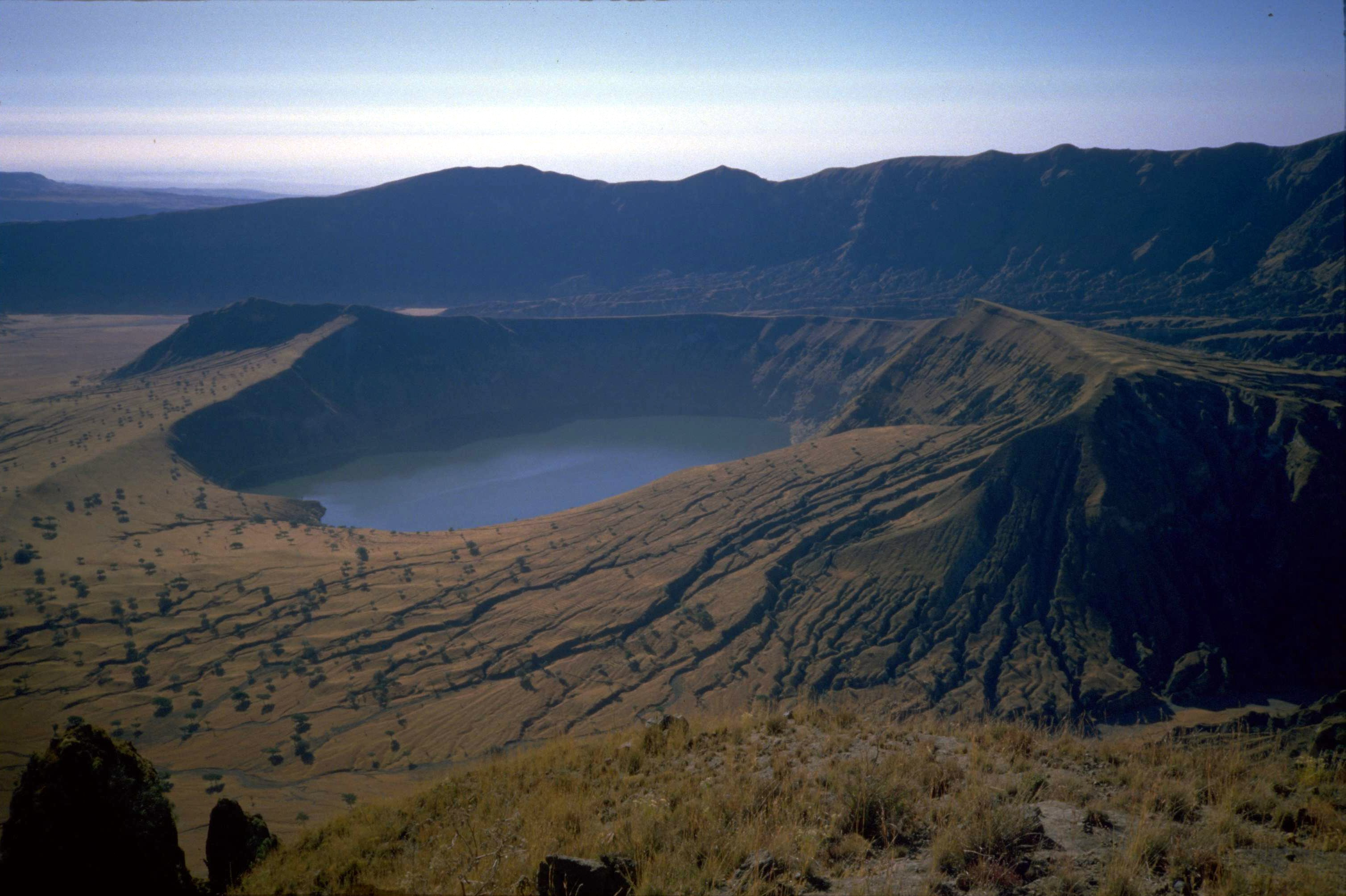
- Inner and outer crater, Deriba Crater

Highest point
- Peak: Deriba crater
- Elevation: 3,042 m (9,980 ft)
- Coordinates: 12°57′00″N 24°16′12″E

Geography
- Location within Sudan
- Country: Sudan
- Region: Darfur

Geology
- Rock type: Volcanic field
- Last eruption: 2000 BC

The Marrah Mountains or Marra Mountains (Fur, Fugo Marra; جبل مرة, Jebel Marra) are a range of volcanic peaks in a massif that rises up to 3,042 metres (9,980 ft). They are the highest mountains in Sudan.

== Geography ==
Waterfall.

The mountains are located in the center of the Darfur region of Sudan on the border of the states of South Darfur and Central Darfur, with a smaller part of the range in the state of North Darfur. The highest point is Deriba Caldera. The upper reaches of the massif is a small area of temperate climate with high rainfall and permanent springs of water amidst the dry savanna and scrub of the Sahel below.

Apart from the Aïr Mountains in Niger which are on the border of the Sahara proper, the Marrah Mountains are the only major mountain range in the otherwise flat Sahel, rising up to 2,600 metres (8,500 ft) above the plain, but are relatively unknown owing to lack of development and political conflict in the region.

The last eruption occurred around 1500 BC. The centre of activity was Deriba Caldera, and involved caldera collapse following the eruption of pumice and pyroclastic flows which travelled over 30 kilometres (19 mi) from the volcano.

The vegetation was described by Gerald Wickens.

== History ==
The Jebel Marra inhibited the spread of Arabisation from east to west, and were a place of refuge for sultans in precolonial times.

From 1984 to 1994, the Jebel Marra Rural Development Project established privately owned and community forests. The project developed nurseries, supplied seedlings and encouraged farmers to plant and manage trees on their own land. Afforestation on private land began in 1984, and some plantations had reached production by 1992, providing income for farmers. The programme relied heavily on the exotic species Eucalyptus citriodora, which farmers favoured for its rapid growth and strong market demand. After the project ended, extension services became very limited, but community forestry continued in the area.

During the War in Darfur, the Marrah Mountains came under the control of the rebel Sudan Liberation Movement/Army faction loyal to Abdul Wahid al Nur. The mountains remained one of the group's most important strongholds, housing several of its bases, as of 2021.
