= Forestry in Ethiopia =

In the late nineteenth century, about 30% of Ethiopia was covered with forest. The clearing of land for agricultural use and the cutting of trees for fuel, gradually changed the scene, and today, forest areas have dwindled to less than 4% of Ethiopia's total land. The northern parts of the highlands are almost devoid of trees. However, about 45,000 square kilometres of dense forest exist in the southern and southwestern sections of the highlands. Some of these include coniferous forests, found at elevations above 1,600 meters, but a majority of the forest land consists primarily of woodlands found in drier areas of the highlands and in the drier areas bordering the highlands.

Lumber from the coniferous forests is important to the construction industry. The broadleaf evergreen forests furnish timber that is used in construction and in the production of plywood. The woodlands are a major source of firewood and charcoal. Certain trees: boswellia and species of commiphora—are of special economic significance. Both grow in the arid lowlands and produce gums that are the bases for frankincense and myrrh. A species of acacia found in several parts of the country is a source of gum arabic used in the manufacture of adhesives, pharmaceutical products, and confectionery. The eucalyptus, an exotic tree introduced in the late nineteenth century and grown mainly near urban areas, is a valuable source of telephone and telegraph poles, tool handles, furniture, and firewood. It is also a major source of the material from which fiberboard and particleboard are made.

Data on forestry's contribution to the economy are not readily available, largely because most GDP tables aggregate data on forestry, fishing, and hunting. In 1980/81, forestry accounted for 2.5% of GDP at constant 1960/61 factor cost and 5.4% of the share attributable to the agricultural sector.

Before 1974, about half of the forestland was privately owned or claimed, and roughly half was held by the government. There was little government control of forestry operations prior to the Ethiopian revolution. The 1975 land reform nationalized forestland and sawmills, which existed mostly in the south. The government controlled harvesting of forestland, and in some cases individuals had to secure permits from local peasant associations to cut trees. But this measure encouraged illegal logging and accelerated the destruction of Ethiopia's remaining forests. To ensure that conservation activity conformed with government policy and directives on land use, reforestation programs were organized through the Ministry of Agriculture and Rural Development or district offices that planned, coordinated, and monitored all work. The local peasant associations lacked decision-making authority.

== Reforestation ==
Reforestation programs resulted in the planting of millions of seedlings in community forests throughout Ethiopia. A variety of Non Governmental Organizations, which had to organize their activities through the local peasant association, supplemented government efforts to rehabilitate Ethiopia's forests. However, critics maintain that both systems caused communal resources to be developed at the expense of private needs. As a result, reforestation programs did not perform well. Seedling survival rates varied from as low as 5 to 20% in some areas to 40% in others, largely because of inadequate care and premature cutting by locals. In late 1990, Addis Ababa was in the process of launching the Ethiopian Forestry Action Plan (EFAP) to improve woodland conservation, increase public participation in reforestation projects, and prevent further depletion of existing forest resources. It remained to be seen whether this plan would improve the state of Ethiopia's forests.

Some protected and reforested areas in Ethiopia have been documented:

- Addi Lihtsi Exclosure, near the village of Addi Lihtsi
- Addi Meles Exclosure, near the village of Migichi
- Addilal Exclosure, near the village of Addilal
- Afedena Exclosure, near the village of Afedena
- Ch'elaqo Exclosure, near the village of Ch'elaqo
- Des’a Forest
- Gemgema Exclosure, near the village of Tsigaba
- Guassa Community Conservation Area
- Harenna Forest
- Khatasa Forest
- Hugumburda Forest
- Kidmi Gestet Exclosure, near the village of Gestet
- Lafa Exclosure, near the village of Lafa in Mizane Birhan municipality
- May Anishti Forest
- May Be'ati Exclosure, near the village of May Be'ati
- May Genet Exclosure, near the village of May Genet
- May Hib'o Exclosure, near the village of Addi Lihtsi
- Menagesha Forest
- Mi'am Atali Exclosure, near the village of Mi'am Atali
- Sesemat Exclosure, near the village of Tahtay Sesemat
- Sheka Forest
- Togogwa Exclosure, near the village of Togogwa
- Tukhul Exclosure, near the village of Tukhul, in Addi Azmera municipality
- Yayu Biosphere Reservation
- Ziban Dake Exclosure, near the village of Didiben

== Deforestation ==
It was estimated that in 2000, Ethiopia had 4,344,000 ha of natural forest area, which was 4% of its total land area. Compared to other East African countries, Ethiopia's deforestation rate was about average, as per a report in 2007. However, the deforestation rates in East Africa are second highest of the continent. Moreover, it has the smallest fraction of its forest area designated primarily for conservation. Apart from Northern Africa, East African countries show the second highest decline rates of conservation forests in the continent.

== See also ==
- Agriculture in Ethiopia
- Economy of Ethiopia
- Church forests of Ethiopia
- EthioTrees
