= Inda Sillasie =

Municipality in Tigray Region, Ethiopia

- Municipality
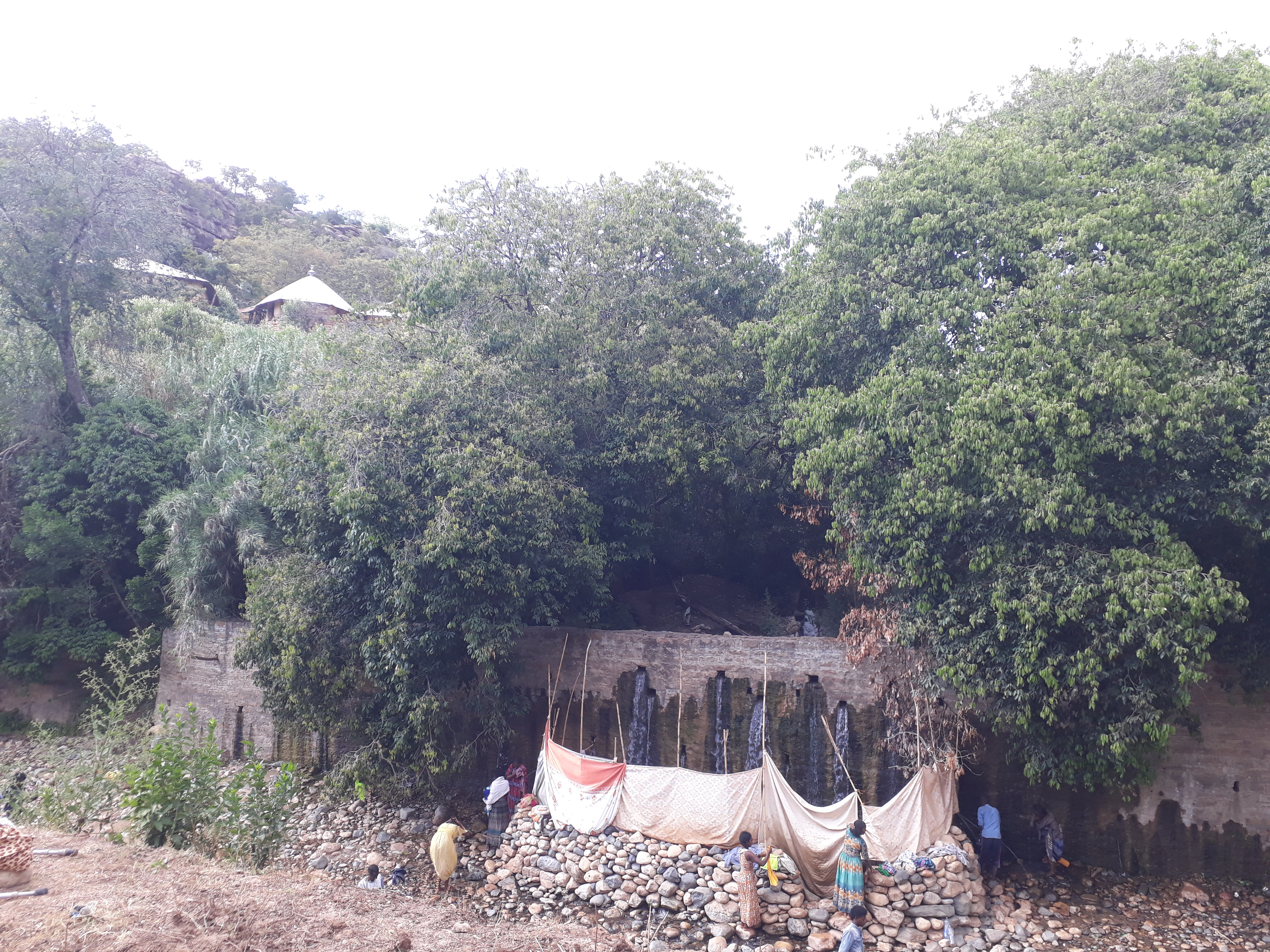
- Inda Abba Hadera holy water

- Location within Ethiopia
- Coordinates: 13°33′N 39°12′E
- Country: Ethiopia
- Region: Tigray
- Zone: Debub Misraqawi (Southeastern)
- Woreda: Dogu'a Tembien

Area
  - Total: 51.26 km^{2} (19.79 sq mi)
- Elevation: 2,130 m (6,990 ft)
- Time zone: UTC+3 (EAT)

Inda Sillasie is a tabia or municipality in the Dogu'a Tembien district of the Tigray Region of Ethiopia. The tabia centre is in Migichi village, located approximately 13 km to the south-southeast of the woreda town Hagere Selam.

== Geography ==
The tabia stretches down from the foot of the Tsatsen ridge to Giba River, over a long ledge between the Inda Sillasie and Gra Agiam/Bitchoqo rivers. The highest peak is a hill at May Ch'elaqo (2330 m a.s.l.) and the lowest place is the confluence between Giba and Bitchoqo rivers (1440 m a.s.l.).

=== Geology ===
From the higher to the lower locations, the following geological formations are present:

- Antalo Limestone
- Adigrat Sandstone
- Quaternary alluvium and freshwater tufa

=== Geomorphology and soils ===
The main geomorphic unit, with corresponding soil types is the gently rolling Antalo Limestone plateau, holding cliffs and valley bottoms.

- Associated soil types
  - shallow stony soils with a dark surface horizon overlying calcaric material (Calcaric Leptosol)
  - moderately deep dark stony clays with good natural fertility (Vertic Cambisol)
  - deep, dark cracking clays on calcaric material (Calcaric Vertisol, Calcic Vertisol)
- Inclusions
  - Rock outcrops and very shallow soils (Lithic Leptosol)
  - Shallow very stony loamy soil on limestone (Skeletic Calcaric Cambisol)
  - Deep dark cracking clays with very good natural fertility, waterlogged during the wet season (Chromic Vertisol, Pellic Vertisol)
  - Brown to dark sands and silt loams on alluvium (Vertic Fluvisol, Eutric Fluvisol, Haplic Fluvisol)

=== Climate and hydrology ===
==== Climate and meteorology ====
The rainfall pattern shows a very high seasonality with 70 to 80% of the annual rain falling in July and August. Mean temperature in Migichi is 21 °C, oscillating between average daily minimum of 11.9 °C and maximum of 29.6 °C. The contrasts between day and night air temperatures are much larger than seasonal contrasts.

==== Rivers ====
The Giba River is the most important river in the surroundings of the tabia. It flows towards Tekezze River and further on to the Nile. This river and its affluents have incised deep gorges which characterise the landscape. The drainage network of the tabia is organised as follows:

- Giba River, forming the southern boundary of the tabia
  - Inda Sillasie River, at the border of Inda Sillasie and Amanit; further upstream it is called Rubaksa River, in tabia Mika'el Abiy
    - May Zegzeg River, at border of tabias Ayninbirkekin and Mika'el Abiy
      - May Sho'ate River, at border of tabias Ayninbirkekin and Mika'el Abiy
      - May Harena, in tabia Mika'el Abiy
    - May Be'ati River, in tabia Ayninbirkekin
  - Gra Adiam River, which becomes Bitchoqo River, at the border of tabias Amanit and Inda Sillasie

Whereas they are (nearly) dry during most of the year, during the main rainy season, these rivers carry high runoff discharges, sometimes in the form of flash floods. Especially at the beginning of the rainy season the water is brown-coloured, evidencing high soil erosion rates. For instance, in the rainy season the Inda Sillasie river, near its outlet, has an average discharge of 9 m^{3} per second, which amounts to 220 m^{3} per second during heavy storms. Annually, some 60,000 tonnes of sediment are exported from the 121 km^{2} large catchment.

==== Springs ====
As there are no permanent rivers in the uplands, the presence of springs is of utmost importance for the local people. The main springs in the tabia are:

- Very strong springs at Dabba Hadera monastery
- May Chelaqot in Akuwaw
- Indasillasie Gedam in the gorge, downslope from Indaslassie village

==== Water harvesting ====
In this area with rains that last only for a couple of months per year, reservoirs of different sizes allow harvesting runoff from the rainy season for further use in the dry season.

- Traditional surface water harvesting ponds, particularly in places without permanent springs, called rahaya
- Horoyo, household ponds, recently constructed through campaigns

=== Vegetation and exclosures ===
The tabia holds several exclosures, areas that are set aside for regreening. Wood harvesting and livestock range are not allowed there. Besides effects on biodiversity, water infiltration, protection from flooding, sediment deposition, carbon sequestration, people commonly have economic benefits from these exclosures through grass harvesting, beekeeping and other non-timber forest products. The local inhabitants also consider it as "land set aside for future generations". In this tabia, some exclosures are managed by the EthioTrees project. They have as an additional benefit that the villagers receive carbon credits for the sequestered CO_{2}, as part of a carbon offset programme. The revenues are then reinvested in the villages, according to the priorities of the communities; it may be for an additional class in the village school, a water pond, conservation in the exclosures, or a store for incense. The following exclosures are managed by the Ethiotrees project in Inda Sillasie municipality:

- Addi Meles, near the village of Migichi (64.84 ha)
- Ch'elaqo, near the homonymous village (49.99 ha)

=== Settlements ===
The tabia centre Migichi holds a few administrative offices, a health post, a primary school, and some small shops. There are a few more primary schools across the tabia. The main other populated places are:

- Akuwaw
- Debre Genet
- Ch'elaqo

- Daboy Tsarba
- Dabba Hadera
- Inda Sillasie

== Agriculture and livelihood ==
The population lives essentially from crop farming, supplemented with off-season work in nearby towns. The land is dominated by farmlands which are clearly demarcated and are cropped every year. Hence the agricultural system is a permanent upland farming system. The farmers have adapted their cropping systems to the spatio-temporal variability in rainfall. Especially the youngsters will go to the deep gorge of Giba river to harvest incense from Boswellia papyrifera trees.

== History and culture ==
=== History ===
The history of the tabia is strongly confounded with the history of Tembien.

=== Religion and churches ===
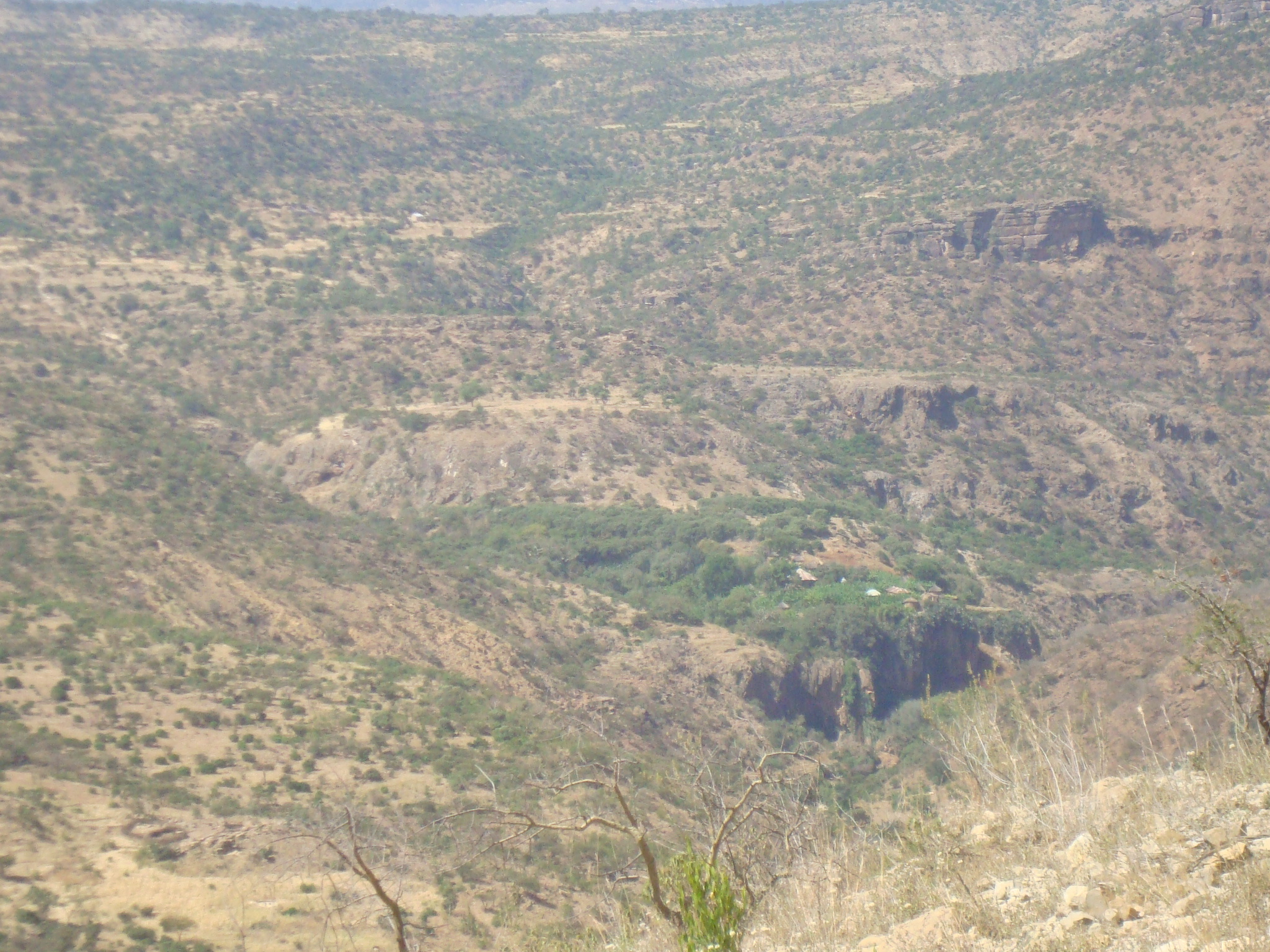
Inda Sillasie monastery

Most inhabitants are Orthodox Christians. The following churches are located in the tabia:

- Sillasie monastery
- Dabba Hadera monastery and well known destination of pilgrims
- Kidane Mihret, in the forest, South of Dabba Hadera
- Migichi Mika'el on top of a small mountain

=== Inda Siwa, the local beer houses ===
In the main villages, there are traditional beer houses (Inda Siwa), often in unique settings, where people socialise. Well known in the tabia centre are Kidan Gebretekle and Fetli Gebregziabher.

== Roads and communication ==
The main road Mekelle – Hagere Selam – Abiy Addi runs 10 to 15 km northwest of the tabia. A rural access road links most villages to the main asphalt road at Dongolo.

== Tourism ==
Its mountainous nature makes the tabia fit for tourism. As compared to many other mountain areas in Ethiopia the villages are quite accessible, and during walks visitors may be invited for coffee, lunch or even for an overnight stay in a rural homestead. Dabba Hadera has grown into a pilgrimage centre where people stay for shorter or longer terms.

=== Touristic attractions ===
- Sillasie monastery
- Dabba Hadera monastery

=== Geotouristic sites ===
The high variability of geological formations and the rugged topography invite for geological and geographic tourism or "geotourism". Geosites in the tabia include:

- Viewpoint from Migichi Mika'el church to the wider surroundings
- Limestone landscapes
- Deeply incised gorges
- Anthropogenic incense landscape on the slopes of Giba gorge
- Views on the Addi Lihtsi large rockfall

=== Trekking routes ===
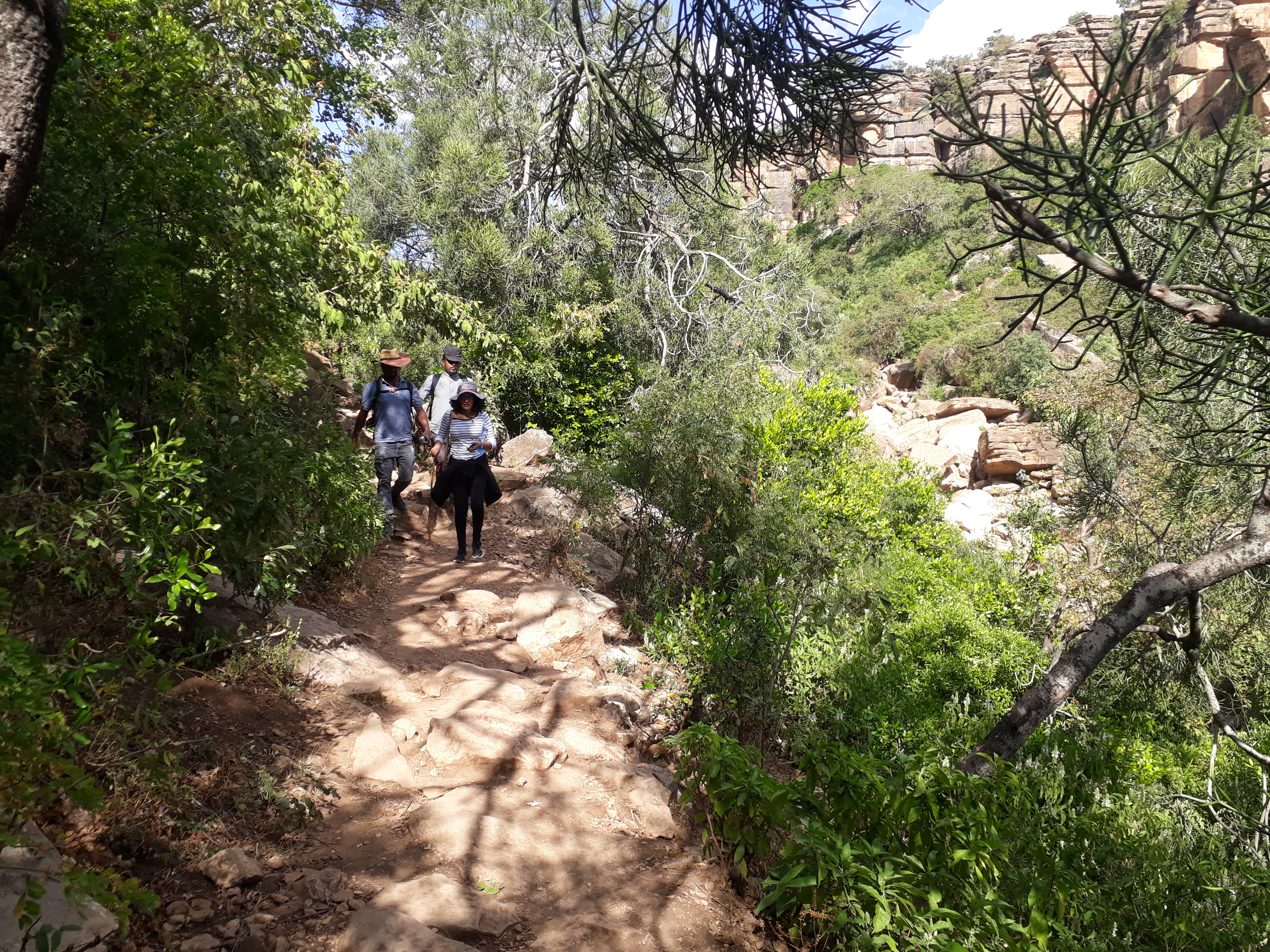
Trekking route 10 between Abba Hadera and Kidane Mihret monasteries

Trekking routes have been established in this tabia. The tracks are not marked on the ground but can be followed using downloaded. GPX files.

- Trek 8V, from Inda Maryam Qorar to Dabba Hadera monastery, a pilgrims' way across the tabia
- Trek 9, from Inda Maryam Qorar to Sillasie monastery, a (less frequented) pilgrims' way across the tabia
- Trek 10, from Giba Gorge, along the Inda Sillassie gorge to Rubaksa; this trek also passes near Dabba Hadera, Kidane Mihret and Sillasie monasteries

== See also ==
- Dogu'a Tembien district.
