= Addi Keshofo River =

River in the Tembien highlands of Ethiopia

Addi Keshofo
- Addi Keshofo River in Dogu’a Tembien
- Etymology: After the homonymous village

Location
- Country: Ethiopia
- Region: Tigray Region
- District (woreda): Dogu’a Tembien

Physical characteristics
- Source: Gudeli
  - location: Amanit municipality
  - elevation: 2,192 m (7,192 ft)
- Mouth: Giba River
  - location: Addi Lettetsiyon in Amanit municipality
  - coordinates: 13.499°N 39.2655°E
  - elevation: 1,520 m (4,990 ft)
- Length: 13.5 km (8.4 mi)
- Width
  - average: 12 m (39 ft)

Basin features
- Progression: Giba→ Tekezé→ Atbarah→ Nile→ Mediterranean Sea
- River system: Permanent river
- Topography: Mountains and deep gorges

The Addi Keshofo is a river of the Nile basin. Rising in the mountains of Dogu’a Tembien in Northern Ethiopia, it flows southwards to empty directly in the Giba and further in Tekezé River.

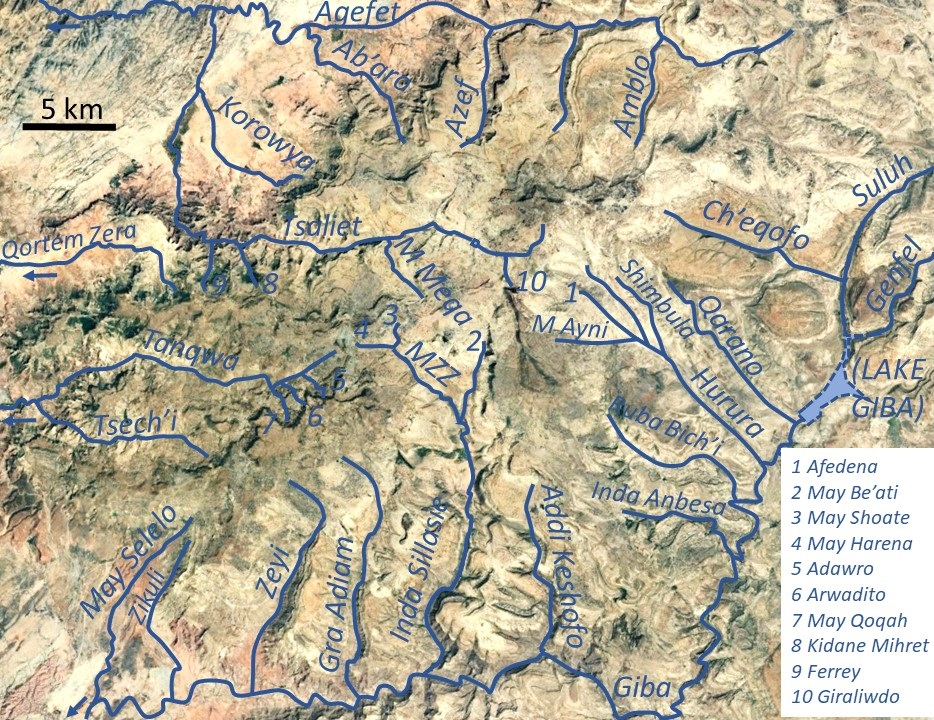
The river in the radial drainage network of Dogu’a Tembien

== Characteristics ==
This is a confined ephemeral river, locally meandering in its narrow alluvial plain, with an average slope gradient of 50 metres per kilometre. With its tributaries, the river has cut a deep gorge.

== Flash floods and flood buffering ==
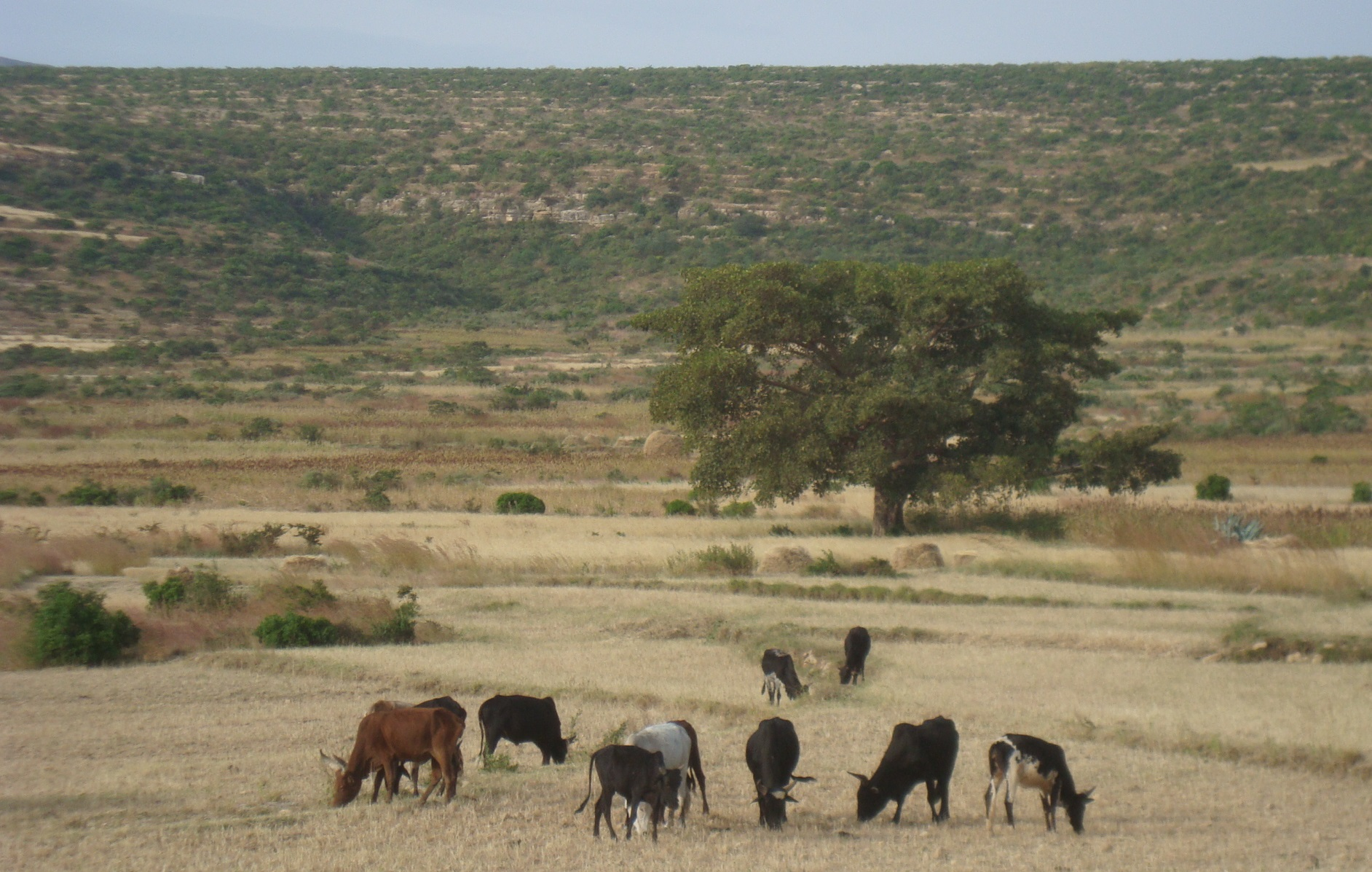
Upper catchment of Addi Keshofo

Runoff mostly happens in the form of high runoff discharge events that occur in a very short period (called flash floods). These are related to the steep topography, often little vegetation cover and intense convective rainfall. The peaks of such flash floods have often a 50 to 100 times larger discharge than the preceding baseflow. The magnitude of floods in this river has however been decreased due to interventions in the catchment. At May Genet and on other steep slopes, exclosures have been established; the dense vegetation largely contributes to enhanced infiltration, less flooding and better baseflow. Physical conservation structures such as stone bunds and check dams also intercept runoff.

== Transhumance towards the gorge ==
Transhumance takes place in the summer rainy season, when the lands near the villages are occupied by crops. Young shepherds will take the village cattle down to the gorge and overnight in small caves. The gorges are particularly attractive as a transhumance destination zone, because there is water and good growth of semi-natural vegetation.

== Boulders and pebbles in the river bed ==
Boulders and pebbles encountered in the river bed can originate from any location higher up in the catchment area. In the uppermost stretches of the river, only rock fragments of the upper lithological units will be present in the river bed, whereas more downstream one may find a more comprehensive mix of all lithologies crossed by the river. From upstream to downstream, the following lithological units occur in the catchment.

- Antalo Limestone
- Quaternary freshwater tufa
- Adigrat Sandstone

== Natural boundary ==
All along its course, the eastern cliff edge of Addi Keshofo River constitutes the borders between the municipalities of Amanit and Debre Nazret.

== Trekking along the river ==
Trekking routes have been established across and along this river. The tracks are not marked on the ground but can be followed using downloaded .GPX files.

- Trek 16 perpendicularly crosses the upper segment of the river and its catchment
- Trek 15, the middle segment
- Trek 18 crosses the lower segment of the river and its gorge

In the rainy season, flash floods may occur and it is advised not to follow the river bed. At times it may be impossible to cross the river in the rainy season.

== See also ==
- List of Ethiopian rivers
