= Addi Meles =

Exclosure for woodland restoration in Ethiopia

Addi Meles exclosure
- Location within Ethiopia
- Location: Inda Sillasie municipality, in Dogu’a Tembien district, Ethiopia
- Nearest city: Hagere Selam
- Coordinates: 13.56°N 39.2°E
- Area: 65 ha (160 acres)
- Website: https://ethiotrees.com

Addi Meles is an exclosure located in the Dogu'a Tembien woreda of the Tigray Region in Ethiopia. The area is protected by the local community.

== Environmental characteristics ==
- Area: 65 ha
- Average slope gradient: 20%
- Aspect: the enclosure is oriented, on both sides of a ridge towards the east and the west
- Minimum altitude: 2163 metres
- Maximum altitude: 2259 metres
- Lithology: Antalo Limestone
- 2018: support by the EthioTrees project

== Management ==
As a general rule, cattle grazing and wood harvesting are unallowed. The grasses are harvested annually and taken to the homesteads of the village to feed livestock. Physical soil and water conservation has been implemented to enhance water infiltration, and vegetation growth. Field observations showed that some illegal grazing occurred in the enclosure in 2018.

== Benefits for the community ==
Setting aside such areas fits with the long-term vision of the communities were hiza’iti lands are set aside for use by the future generations. It has also direct benefits for the community:

- improved ground water availability
- honey production
- climate ameliorator (temperature, moisture)
- the sequestered carbon (in total 84 tonnes per ha, dominantly sequestered in the soil, and additionally in the woody vegetation) is certified using the Plan Vivo voluntary carbon standard, after which carbon credits are sold
- the revenues are then reinvested in the villages, according to the priorities of the communities; it may be for an additional class in the village school, a water pond, or conservation in the exclosures.
