= Kidmi Gestet =

Exclosure for woodland restoration in Ethiopia

Kidmi Gestet exclosure
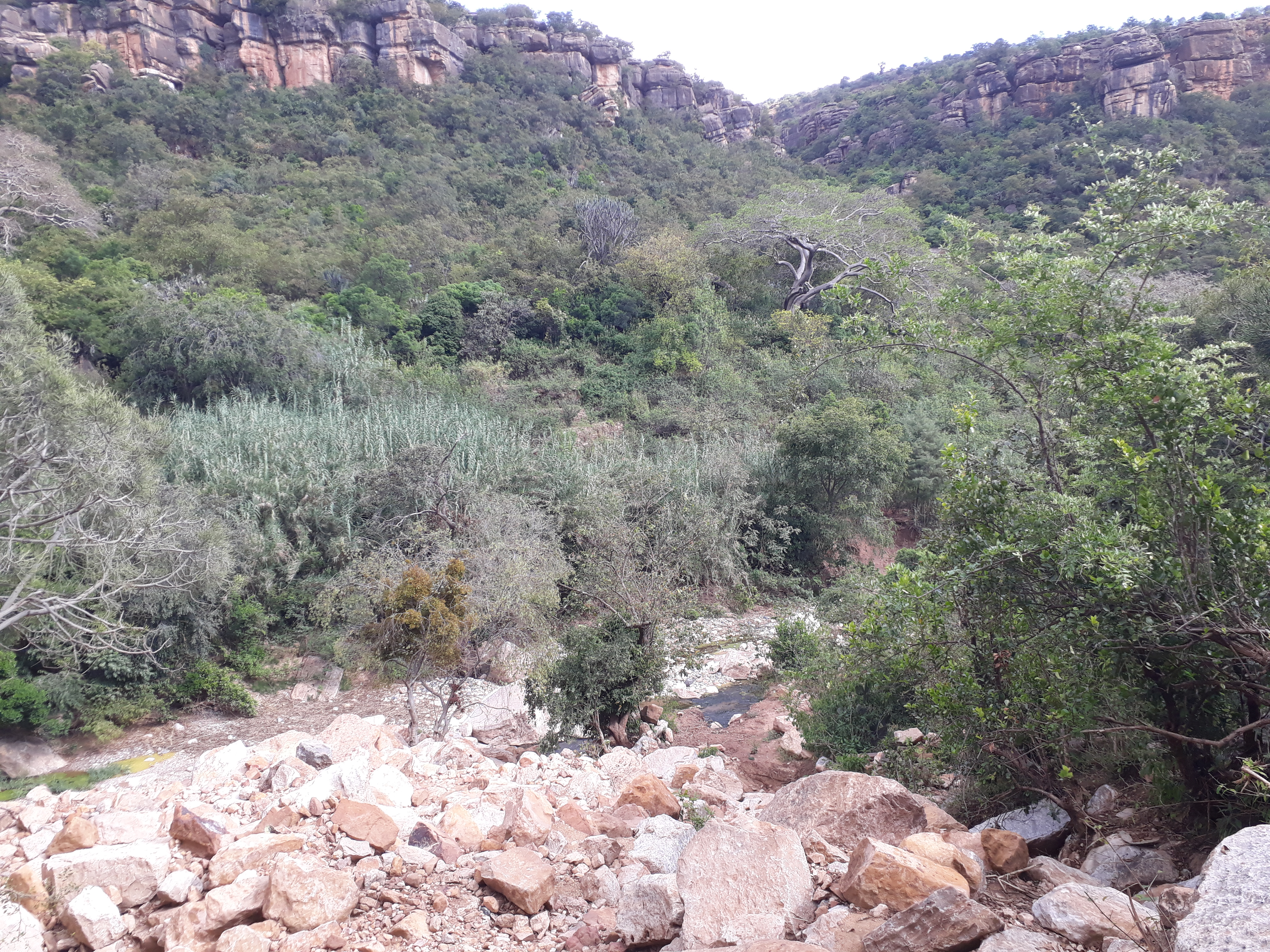
- Kidmi Gestet exclosure

- Location within Ethiopia
- Location: Amanit municipality, in Dogu’a Tembien district, Ethiopia
- Nearest city: Hagere Selam
- Coordinates: 13.557°N 39.239°E
- Area: 46 ha (110 acres)
- Website: https://ethiotrees.com

Kidmi Gestet is an exclosure located in the Dogu'a Tembien woreda of the Tigray Region in Ethiopia.

== Environmental characteristics ==
- Area: 46 ha
- Average slope gradient: 48%
- Minimum altitude: 2015 metres
- Maximum altitude: 2131 metres
- Lithology: Antalo Limestone
- 2017: support by the EthioTrees project

== Management ==
Cattle ranging and wood harvesting are prohibited in Kidmi Gestet. The grasses are harvested once yearly and taken to the homesteads of the village to feed livestock.

== Benefits for the community ==
Setting aside such areas fits with the long-term vision of the communities: hiza’iti lands are set aside for use by the future generations. This also has direct benefits for the community, including:

- improved ground water availability
- honey production
- climate ameliorator (temperature, moisture)
- the sequestered carbon is certified using the Plan Vivo voluntary carbon standard, after which carbon credits are sold
- the revenues are then reinvested in the villages, according to the priorities of the communities; it may be for an additional class in the village school, a water pond, or conservation in the exclosures.

== Biodiversity ==
With vegetation growth, biodiversity in this enclosure has strongly improved, showing more varied vegetation and wildlife.
