= Addi Lihtsi (exclosure) =

Exclosure for woodland restoration in Ethiopia

Addi Lihtsi exclosure
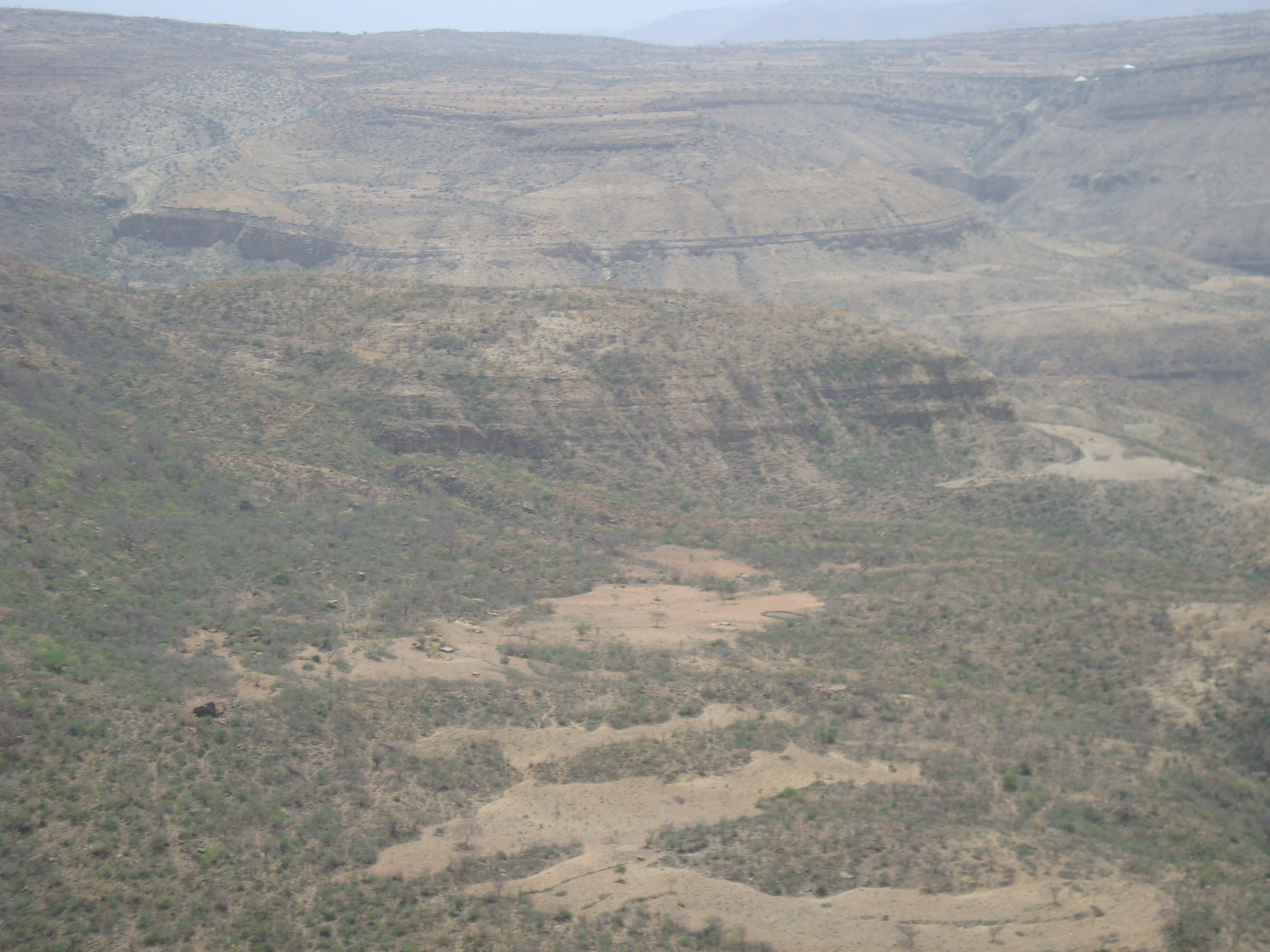
- Addi Lihtsi exclosure

- Location within Ethiopia
- Location: Amanit municipality, in Dogu’a Tembien district, Ethiopia
- Nearest city: Hagere Selam
- Coordinates: 13.494°N 39.231°E
- Area: 412 ha (1,020 acres)
- Website: https://ethiotrees.com

Addi Lihtsi is an exclosure located in the Dogu'a Tembien woreda of the Tigray Region in Ethiopia. The area is protected by the local community.

== Environmental characteristics ==
- Area: 412 ha
- Average slope gradient: 30%
- Aspect: the exclosure is oriented towards the south
- Minimum altitude: 1491 metres
- Maximum altitude: 1874 metres
- Lithology: Antalo Limestone and Adigrat Sandstone
- 2017: support by the EthioTrees project

== Management ==
As a general rule, cattle ranging and wood harvesting are not allowed. The grasses are harvested once yearly and taken to the homesteads of the village to feed livestock. Field observations showed that no illegal grazing occurred in the exclosure in 2018.

== Benefits for the community ==
Setting aside such areas fits with the long-term vision of the communities were hiza’iti lands are set aside for use by the future generations. It has also direct benefits for the community:

- improved ground water availability
- honey production
- incense (oil) production

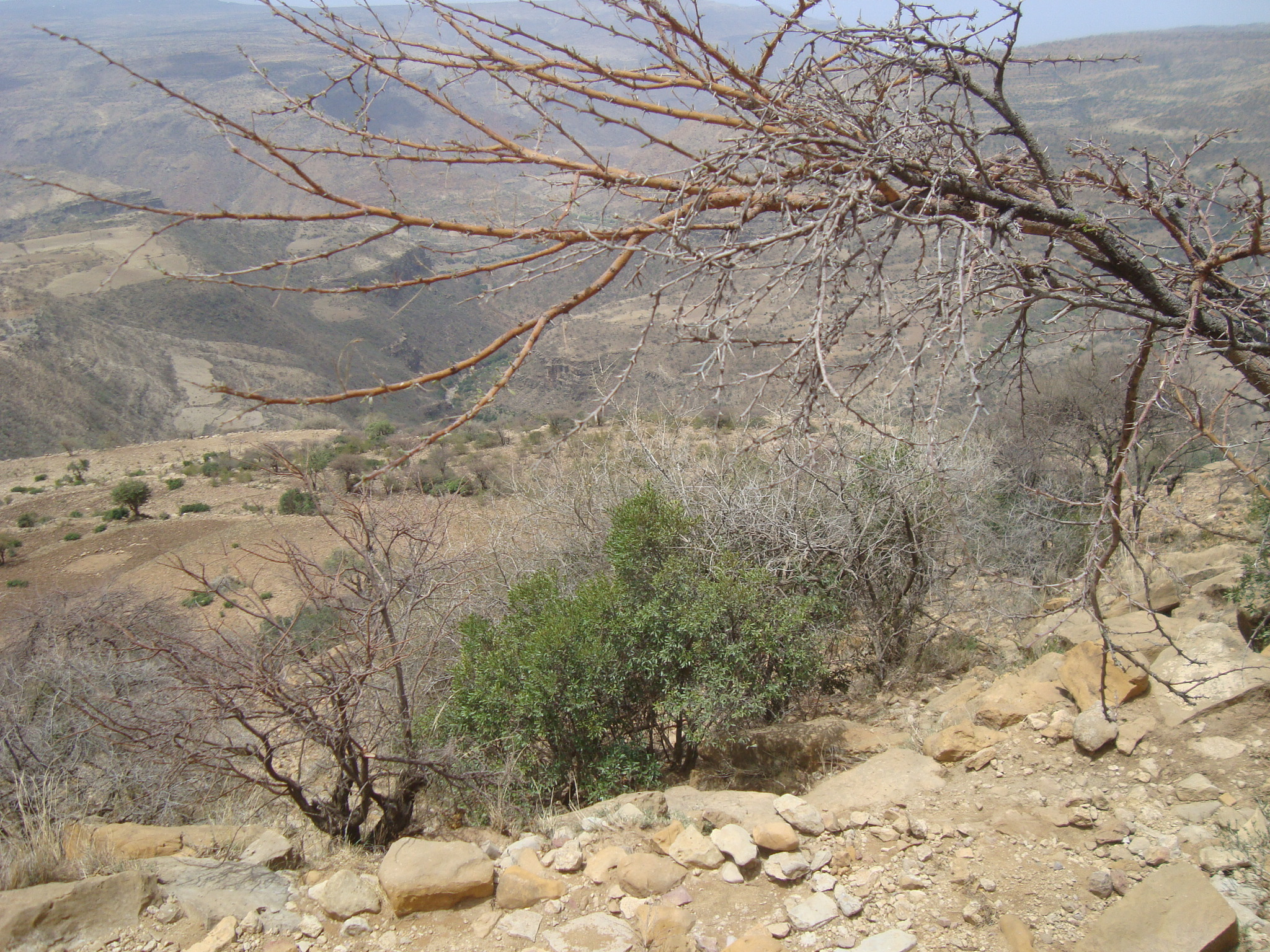
Addi Lihtsi exclosure

- climate ameliorator (temperature, moisture)
- the sequestered carbon is certified using the Plan Vivo voluntary carbon standard, after which carbon credits are sold
- the revenues are then reinvested in the villages, according to the priorities of the communities; it may be for an additional class in the village school, a water pond, conservation in the exclosures, or a store for incense.
