= May Hib'o =

Exclosure for woodland restoration in Ethiopia

May Hib’o exclosure
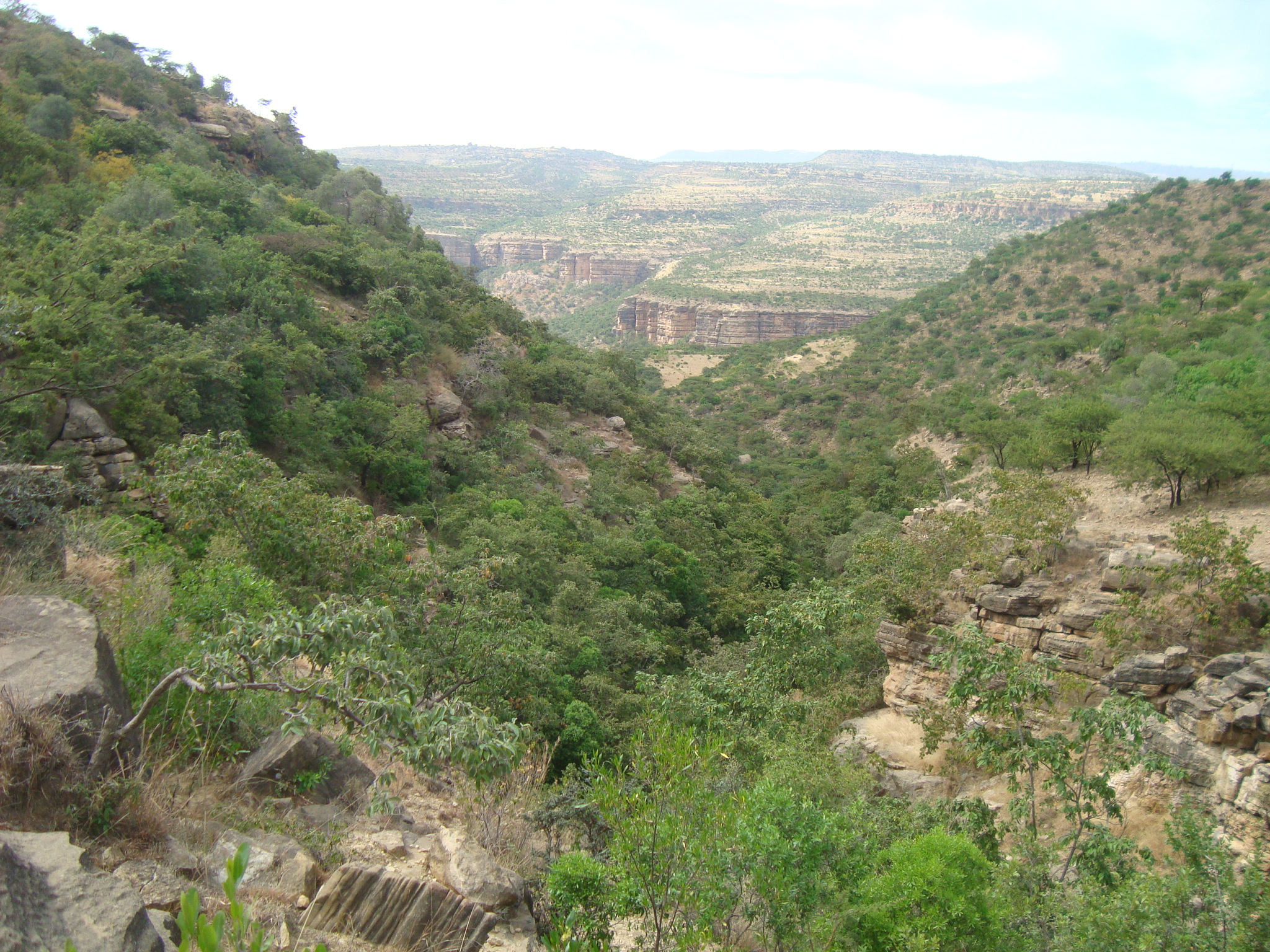
- May Hib’o exclosure

- Location within Ethiopia
- Location: Amanit municipality, in Dogu’a Tembien district, Ethiopia
- Nearest city: Hagere Selam
- Coordinates: 13.525°N 39.231°E
- Area: 50 ha (120 acres)
- Website: https://ethiotrees.com

May Hib’o is an exclosure located in the Dogu'a Tembien woreda of the Tigray Region in Ethiopia. The exclosure holds a 70-metre long cave.

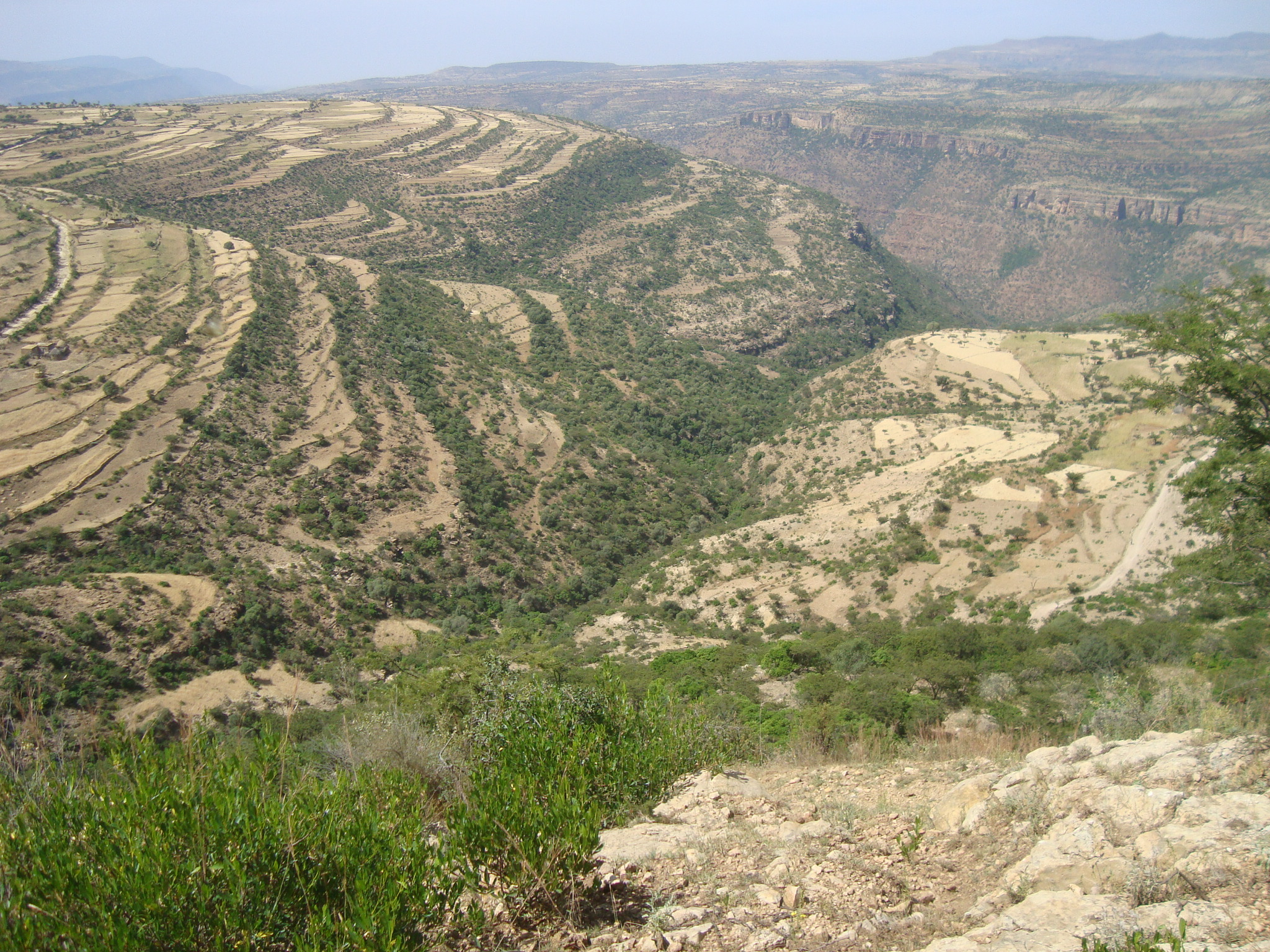
May Hib’o cave is located near the junction of the two gorges.

== Environmental characteristics ==
- Area: 50 ha
- Average slope gradient: 35%
- Aspect: the exclosure is oriented towards the southwest and the north (both sides of a gorge)
- Minimum altitude: 1896 metres
- Maximum altitude: 2146 metres
- Lithology: Antalo Limestone
- 2017: support by the EthioTrees project

== Management ==
As a general rule, cattle ranging and wood harvesting are not allowed. The grasses are harvested once yearly and taken to the homesteads of the village to feed livestock.

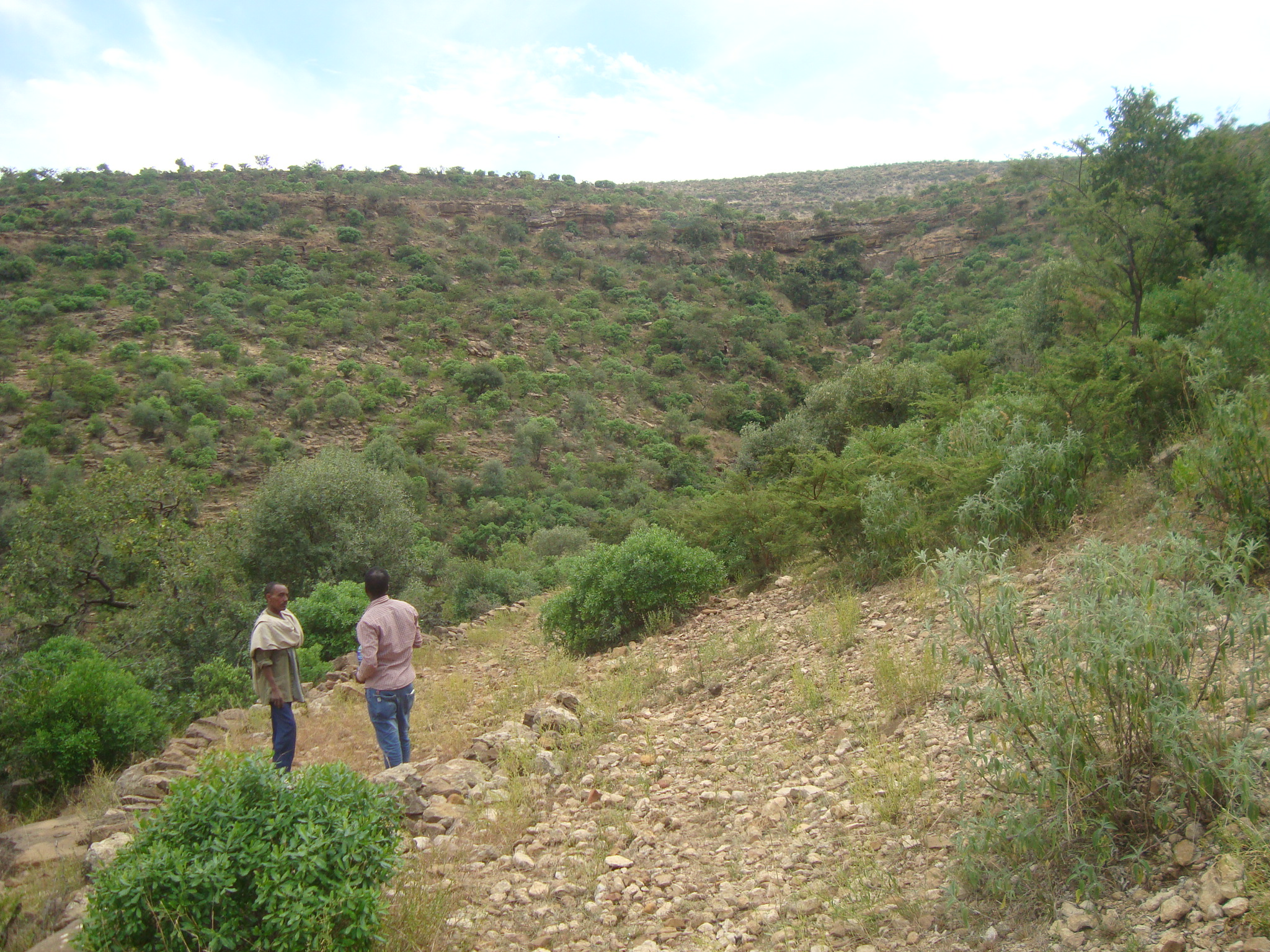
May Hib’o

== Benefits for the community ==
Setting aside such areas fits with the long-term vision of the communities were hiza’iti lands are set aside for use by the future generations. It has also direct benefits for the community:

- improved ground water availability
- honey production
- climate ameliorator (temperature, moisture)
- the sequestered carbon (in total 85 tonnes per ha, dominantly sequestered in the soil, and additionally in the woody vegetation) is certified using the Plan Vivo voluntary carbon standard, after which carbon credits are sold
- the revenues are then reinvested in the villages, according to the priorities of the communities; it may be for an additional class in the village school, a water pond, or conservation in the exclosure.

== Biodiversity ==
With vegetation growth, biodiversity in this exclosure hast strongly improved: there is more varied vegetation and wildlife.
