= Ch'elaqo (exclosure) =

Exclosure for woodland restoration in Ethiopia

Ch’elaqo exclosure
- Location within Ethiopia
- Location: Inda Sillasie municipality, in Dogu’a Tembien district, Ethiopia
- Nearest city: Hagere Selam
- Coordinates: 13.591°N 39.197°E
- Area: 50 ha (120 acres)
- Website: https://ethiotrees.com

Ch’elaqo is an exclosure located in the Dogu'a Tembien woreda of the Tigray Region in Ethiopia.

== Environmental characteristics ==
- Area: 50 ha
- Average slope gradient: 46%
- Aspect: the exclosure is oriented towards the southwest
- Minimum altitude: 2169 metres
- Maximum altitude: 2336 metres
- Lithology: Antalo Limestone
- 2018: support by the EthioTrees project

== Management ==
As a general rule, cattle ranging and wood harvesting are not allowed. The grasses are harvested once yearly and taken to the homesteads of the village to feed livestock. Field observations showed that no illegal grazing occurred in the exclosure in 2018.

== Benefits for the community ==
Setting aside such areas fits with the long-term vision of the communities were hiza’iti lands are set aside for use by the future generations. It has also direct benefits for the community:

- improved ground water availability
- honey production
- climate ameliorator (temperature, moisture)
- the sequestered carbon (in total 84 tonnes per ha, dominantly sequestered in the soil, and additionally in the woody vegetation) is certified using the Plan Vivo voluntary carbon standard, after which carbon credits are sold
- the revenues are then reinvested in the villages, according to the priorities of the communities; it may be for an additional class in the village school, a water pond, or conservation in the exclosures.

== Biodiversity ==
With vegetation growth, biodiversity in this exclosure has strongly improved, not only with regard to flora but also with regard to fauna.
