= EthioTrees =

Project for woodland restoration in Ethiopia

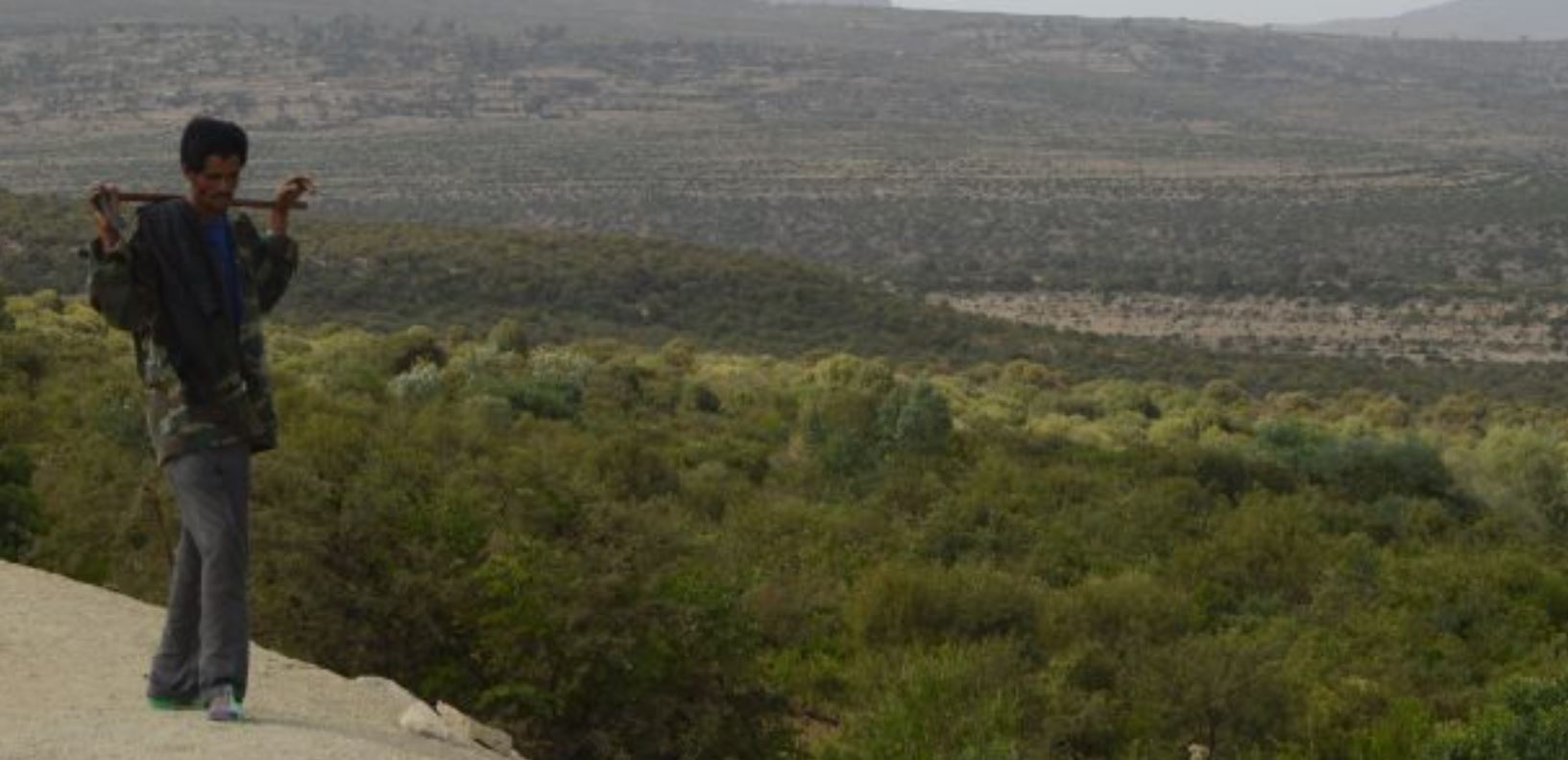
- An exclosure managed by EthioTrees
- Mission statement: Promotion of forest restoration and non-timber forest production, by supporting woodland natural regeneration and ecosystem services
- Products: Carbon offset, Incense, Ground water
- Location: Hagere Selam, Dogu’a Tembien
- Owner: Non-Profit Organisation
- Country: Ethiopia
- Key people: Sil Lanckriet, Seifu Gebreselassie, Hannes Cosyns, Gebrekidan Mesfin, Jan Nyssen, Miro Jacob, Meybale
- Established: 2016
- Website: ethiotrees.com

The EthioTrees Ecosystem Restoration Association, in short EthioTrees, established in 2016, is a Non Governmental organization that has it project focused on environmental rehabilitation and woodland restoration in Dogu’a Tembien (Ethiopia). The association manages exclosures (land protected from grazing) with the intent of improving the ecosystem and sequestering carbon. In 2018, it managed 18 million exclosures comprising over 1500 ha.

== Context ==
For many years, there has been severe land degradation and desertification in Tigray and the area became also impoverished; however, a lot of efforts are done to rehabilitate these semi-arid mountain landscapes. Since 1994, researchers, students, and field assistants have studied the environment of Dogu’a Tembien. To contribute to the ongoing effort for rehabilitation, they initiated development projects that addressed in the first place land conservation, ecosystem services, and livelihood. EthioTrees is one of these projects.

== Objectives ==
EthioTrees has as objectives:

- to enhance community-driven woodland restoration in exclosures
- to sequester carbon in exclosures, both as above-ground biomass and soil organic matter
- to develop and valorise ecosystem services, including:

* ground water availability
* honey production
* incense (oil) production

== Associations of landless farmers ==
EthioTrees not only improves soil organic carbon, biomass, groundwater recharge, or biodiversity but also cash income for landless farmers. Most farmers estimate that lack of access to water is the main problem for their livelihood. In addition, landless youngsters derive much less income from sales of livestock or agricultural produce, in comparison to farmers with land. The communities are invited to design and implement the project themselves; for this purpose, EthioTrees uses a participatory mapping approach during all phases of the project.

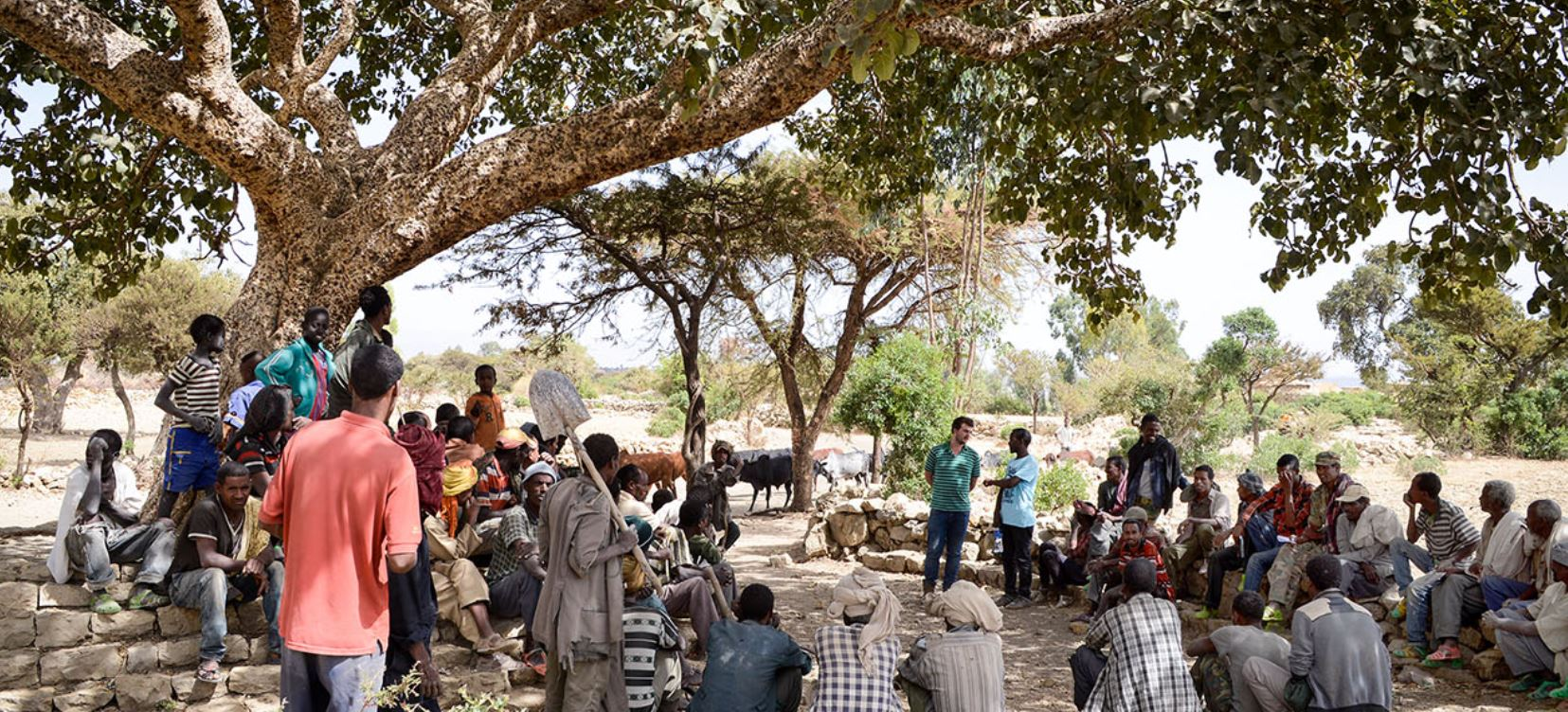
Ethiotrees project meeting

== EthioTrees’ exclosures ==
The EthioTrees project manages these exclosures:

- Addi Lihtsi, near the village of Addi Lihtsi (412 ha)
- Addi Meles, near the village of Migichi (65 ha)
- Addilal, near the village of Addilal (144.81 ha)
- Afedena, near the village of Afedena (70 ha)
- Ch'elaqo, near the village of Ch'elaqo (50 ha)
- Gemgema, near the village of Tsigaba (92 ha)
- Kidmi Gestet, near the village of Gestet (46 ha)
- Lafa, near the village of Lafa in Mizane Birhan municipality (45.25 ha)
- May Be'ati, near the village of May Be'ati (46 ha)
- Mi'am Atali, near the village of Mi'am Atali (83 ha)
- May Genet, near the village of May Genet (60 ha)
- May Hib'o, near the village of Addi Lihtsi (50 ha)
- Sesemat, near the village of Tahtay Sesemat (46 ha)
- Togogwa, near the village of Togogwa (196 ha)
- Tukhul, near the village of Tukhul, in Addi Azmera municipality (36 ha)
- Ziban Dake, near the village of Didiben (300 ha)
- Gojam Sfra, near the village of Migichi (275 ha)
- Katina Ruba, near the village of Didiben (48 ha)

== Ecosystem restoration and valorisation ==
EthioTrees manages 18 exclosures with a total area of 1174 hectares in 2017 and 1596 ha in 2018. The older the exclosures, the higher is the total carbon content in vegetation and soil. EthioTrees has calculated that they manage to sequester 9.2 tonnes CO_{2} per year per hectare.

== Carbon offset ==
The sequestered carbon is certified using the Plan Vivo voluntary carbon standard, after which carbon credits are sold, among others to Davines, an Italian producer of beauty products. This company at the same time wishes to create a virtuous impact on people and the environment. The revenues are then reinvested in the villages, according to the priorities of the communities; it may be for an additional class in the village school, a water pond, conservation in the exclosures, or a store for incense.

== Partners ==
Main partners of Ethiotrees are

- Dogu’a Tembien District Administration (Ethiopia)
- Municipal administrations (Ethiopia)
- Incense producing cooperatives (Ethiopia)
- Plan Vivo (U.K.)
- Mekelle University (Ethiopia)
- VLIR-UOS (Belgium)
- Davines (Italy)
- Ghent University (Belgium)
- Province East Flanders (Belgium)
- King Baudouin Foundation (Belgium)
- Bos Plus (Belgium)
- Province West Flanders (Belgium)
- Ñangareko Consultores (Bolivia)
- Association Tesfay (Liége, Belgium)
