= Hagere Selam massacres =

Massacre in Hagere Selam, Southwestern Tigray as part of Tigray war

Coordinates: 13.64769°N 39.17265°E

Hagere Selam massacre
- Part of Tigray War
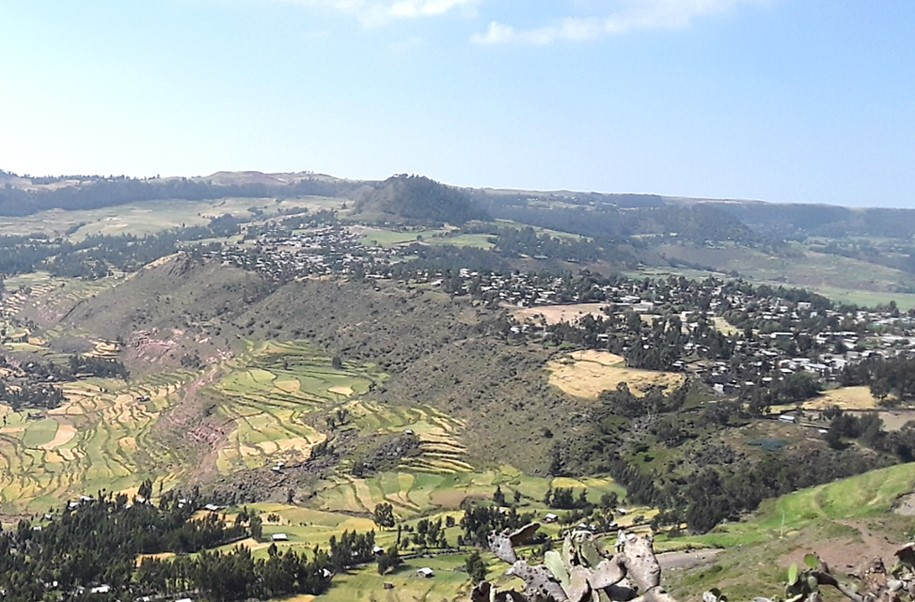
- Hagere Selam (Dogu’a Tembien)

- Location of Hagere Selam in Tigray (Ethiopia)
- Location: Hagere Selam (Tigrinya: ሃገረ ሰላም), Tigray Region, Ethiopia
- Date: 4-5 December 2020
- Target: Tigrayans
- Attack type: Mass killing
- Deaths: 23 civilians
- Perpetrators: (Ethiopia) Ethiopian National Defence Force (Eritrea) Eritrean Defence Forces

The Hagere Selam massacres were mass extrajudicial killings that took place in Hagere Selam in the Tigray Region of Ethiopia during the Tigray War, on 4 and 5 December 2020.

== Executions ==
In Hagere Selam, where Belgian physical geographer Jan Nyssen has a secondary residence, Nyssen reported extrajudicial killings of 60 civilians during 4–5 December 2020 by the ENDF and EDF. The EDF then looted Hagere Selam during two days, including Nyssen's house, from which his fridge, bed, clothes, plastic basins and other goods were stolen.

Typical massacres committed by Ethiopian and Eritrean soldiers in the Tigray war are (1) revenge when they lose a battle; (2) to terrorise and extract information about whereabouts of TPLF leaders; (3) murder of suspected family members of TDF fighters; and (4) terrorising the Tigray society as a whole such as in case of mass killings in churches. According to Europe External Programme with Africa (EEPA), the executions are interpreted as revenge for the EDF having lost a battle against Tigray People's Liberation Front (TPLF) forces.

Aftermath of the 2020 Hagere Selam massacre

== Perpetrators ==
The inhabitants interpreted the identity of the perpetrators as Eritrean and Ethiopian soldiers.

== Victims ==
The “Tigray: Atlas of the humanitarian situation” mentions 23 victims, of which 21 have been identified.

== Reactions ==
The “Tigray: Atlas of the humanitarian situation”, that documented this massacre received international media attention, particularly with regard its Annex A, that lists the massacres.

After months of denial by the Ethiopian authorities that massacres occurred in Tigray, a joint investigation by OHCHR and the Ethiopian Human Rights Commission has been announced in March 2021.

While the Ethiopian government promised that Eritrean troops will be pulled out from Tigray, the Eritrean government denies any participation in warfare in Tigray, leave alone in massacres.

== See also ==
- Galikoma massacre
- Benishangul-Gumuz conflict
