= Amanit =

Municipality in Tigray Region, Ethiopia

- Tabia
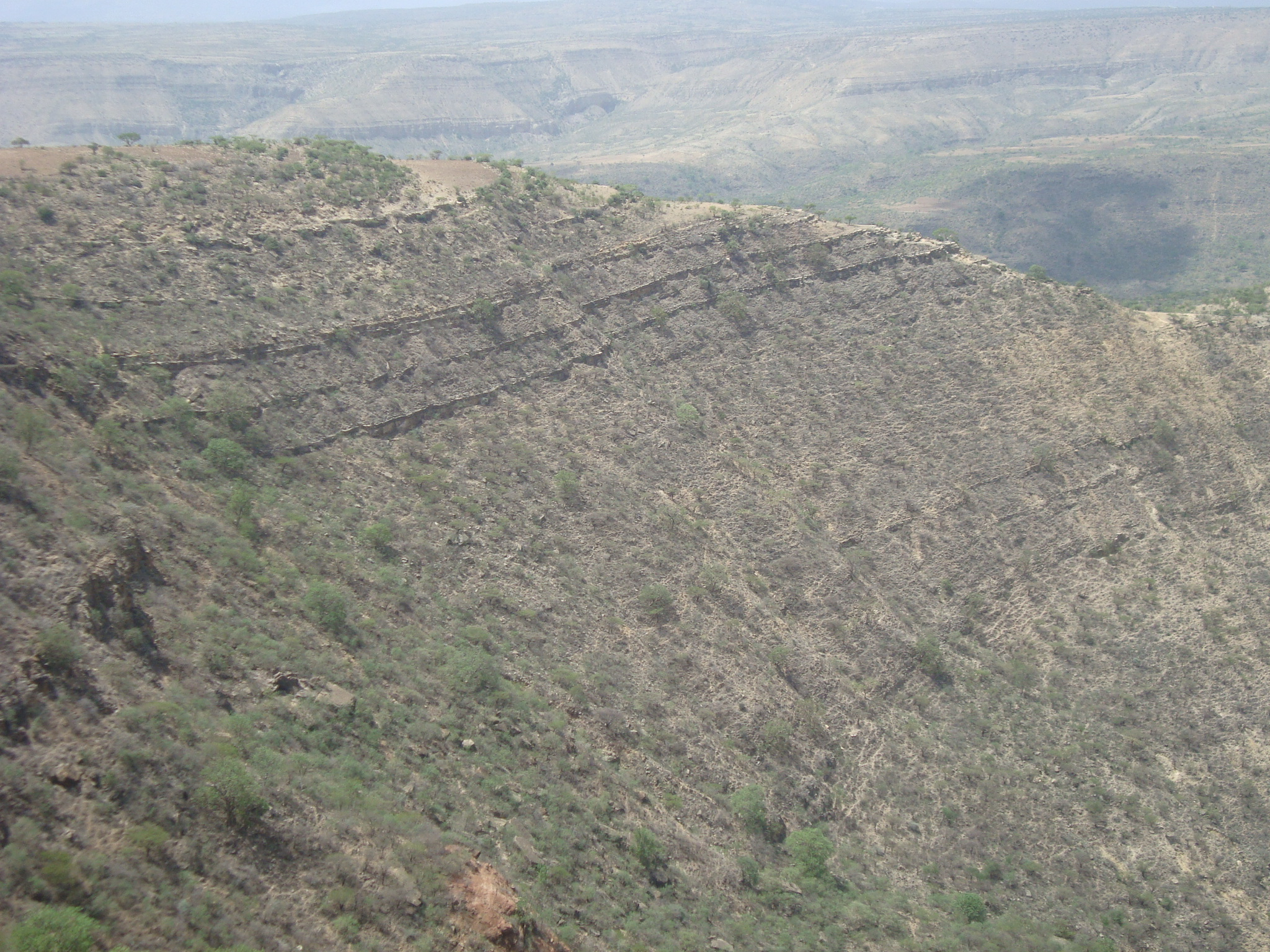
- Slopes with incense trees at the lower end of Amanit

- Location within Ethiopia
- Coordinates: 13°33′N 39°15′E
- Country: Ethiopia
- Region: Tigray
- Zone: Debub Misraqawi (Southeastern)
- Woreda: Dogu'a Tembien

Area
  - Total: 60.61 km^{2} (23.40 sq mi)
- Elevation: 1,900 m (6,200 ft)
- Time zone: UTC+3 (EAT)

Amanit is a tabia or municipality in the Dogu'a Tembien district of the Tigray Region of Ethiopia. The tabia centre is Addi Qeshofo village, located approximately 15 km to the southeast of the woreda town Hagere Selam (as the crow flies).

== Geography ==
The tabia stretches down southbound over an elongated ridge between Inda Sillasie River and Addi Keshofo River towards Giba River. The highest place is a hill east of Gudeli (2230 m a.s.l.) and the lowest place at the junction of Inda Sillasie and Giba Rivers (1448 m a.s.l.).

=== Geology ===
The two main geological formations are Antalo Limestone in most of the tabia, and Adigrat Sandstone on the slopes towards the river gorges. Quaternary alluvium and freshwater tufa occur in the valley bottoms.

=== Geomorphology and soils ===
The main geomorphic units, with corresponding soil types are:

- Gently rolling Antalo Limestone plateau, holding cliffs and valley bottoms on limestone
  - Associated soil types
    - shallow stony soils with a dark surface horizon overlying calcaric material (Calcaric Leptosol)
    - moderately deep dark stony clays with good natural fertility (Vertic Cambisol)
    - deep, dark cracking clays on calcaric material (Calcaric Vertisol, Calcic Vertisol)
  - Inclusions
    - Rock outcrops and very shallow soils (Lithic Leptosol)
    - Shallow very stony loamy soil on limestone (Skeletic Calcaric Cambisol)
    - Deep dark cracking clays with very good natural fertility, waterlogged during the wet season (Chromic Vertisol, Pellic Vertisol)
    - Brown to dark sands and silt loams on alluvium (Vertic Fluvisol, Eutric Fluvisol, Haplic Fluvisol)
- Strongly incised Giba gorge
  - Dominant soil type: complex of rock outcrops, very stony and very shallow soils ((Lithic) Leptosol)
  - Associated soil types
    - shallow, stony, dark, loamy soils on calcaric material (Rendzic Leptosol)
    - shallow, stony to sandy loam soils on calcaric material (Calcaric Regosol and Cambisol
    - brown loamy sands developed on alluvium along Giba River (Fluvisol)

=== Water ===
==== Springs and irrigation ====
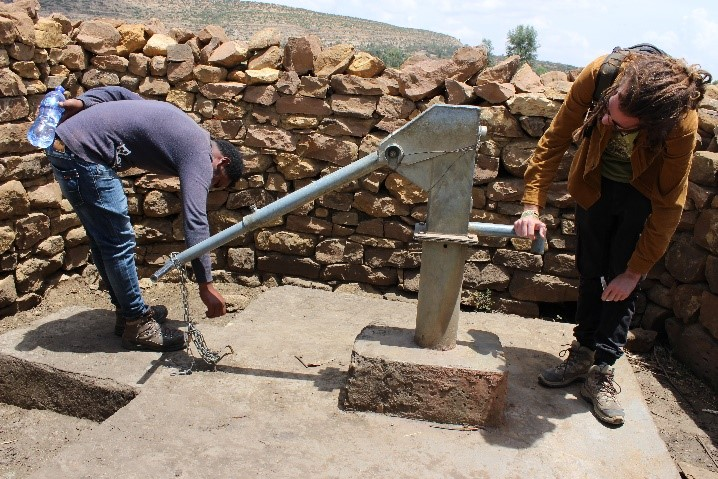
Gudeli hand pump

There is permanent water in the main rivers, but located deep in the gorges, they are difficult of access. It is used for irrigation, and occasionally for drinking water. Hence, the presence of springs is of utmost importance for the local people. The following are the springs in the tabia:

- Addi Qeshefo in the homonymous village
- Gudeli in May Genet
- May Hib'o inside a cave in Addi Lihtsi

==== Ponds ====
In this area with rains that last only for a couple of months per year, reservoirs of different sizes allow harvesting runoff from the rainy season for further use in the dry season. There are many traditional surface water harvesting ponds, particularly in places without permanent springs, called rahaya; they continue to be maintained and expanded. In addition, Horoyo, household ponds, have recently been constructed through campaigns.

=== Vegetation and exclosures ===
The tabia holds several exclosures, areas that are set aside for regreening. Wood harvesting and livestock range are not allowed there. Besides effects on biodiversity, water infiltration, protection from flooding, sediment deposition, carbon sequestration, people commonly have economic benefits from these exclosures through grass harvesting, beekeeping and other non-timber forest products. The local inhabitants also consider it as "land set aside for future generations". In this tabia, some exclosures are managed by the EthioTrees project. They have as an additional benefit that the villagers receive carbon credits for the sequestered CO_{2}, as part of a carbon offset programme. The revenues are then reinvested in the villages, according to the priorities of the communities; it may be for an additional class in the village school, a water pond, conservation in the exclosures, or a store for incense. The following exclosures are managed by the Ethiotrees project in Amanit municipality:

- Addi Lihtsi, near the homonymous village (415.65 ha)
- Kidmi Gestet, near the village of Gestet (26.76 ha)
- May Genet, near the homonymous village (29.89 ha)
- May Hib'o, near the village of Addi Lihtsi (46.72 ha)

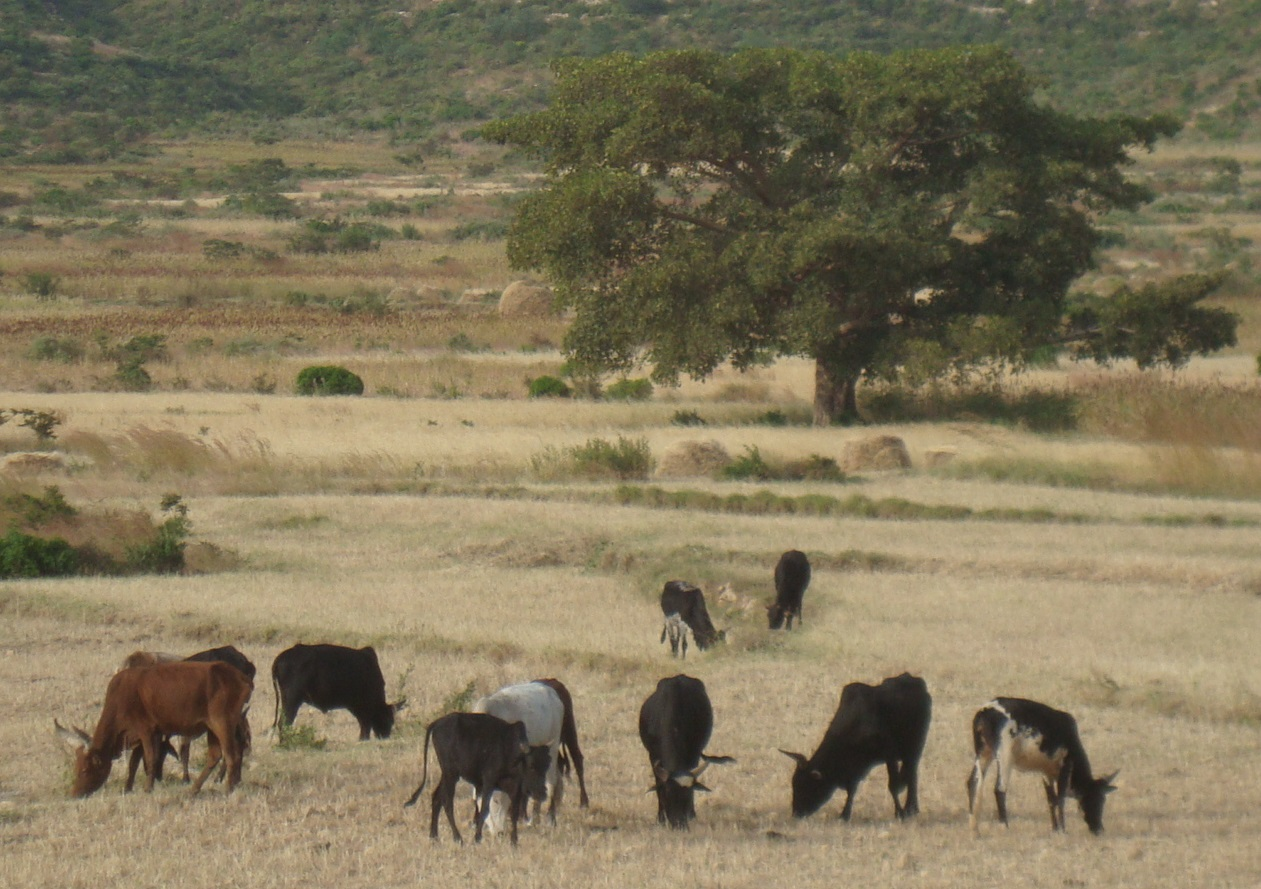
Cattle grazing the stubble in Gudeli

=== Livelihood ===
The population lives essentially from crop farming, supplemented with off-season work in nearby towns. The land is dominated by farmlands which are clearly demarcated and are cropped every year. Hence the agricultural system is a permanent upland farming system. Especially the youngsters will go to the deep gorge of Giba river to harvest incense from Boswellia papyrifera trees.

=== Population ===
The tabia centre Addi Qeshofo holds a few administrative offices, a health post, a primary school, and some small shops. There are a few more primary schools across the tabia. The main other populated places are:

- Gudeli
- May Genet
- Segenet
- Hemhamo

- Addi Lihtsi
- Addi Lettetsion
- Gestet
- Dabba Hadera (partly)

=== Religion and churches ===
Most inhabitants are Orthodox Christians. The following churches are located in the tabia:

- Segenet Maryam
- Gudeli Abune Aregawi

- Addi Lihtsi Giyergis
- Dabba Hadera, a famous place for pilgrimages, in the gorge west of the tabia
- Inda Sillasie monastery, in the gorge west of the tabia

== History ==
The history of the tabia is strongly confounded with the history of Tembien.

== Roads and communication ==
The main road Mekelle – Hagere Selam – Abiy Addi is far away from the tabia. A rural access road links most villages to Togogwa in Debre Nazret, where there is public transport to Mekelle and Hagere Selam.

== Schools ==
Almost all children of the tabia are schooled, though in some schools there is lack of classrooms, directly related to the large intake in primary schools over the last decades. Schools in the tabia include Amanit school.

== Tourism ==
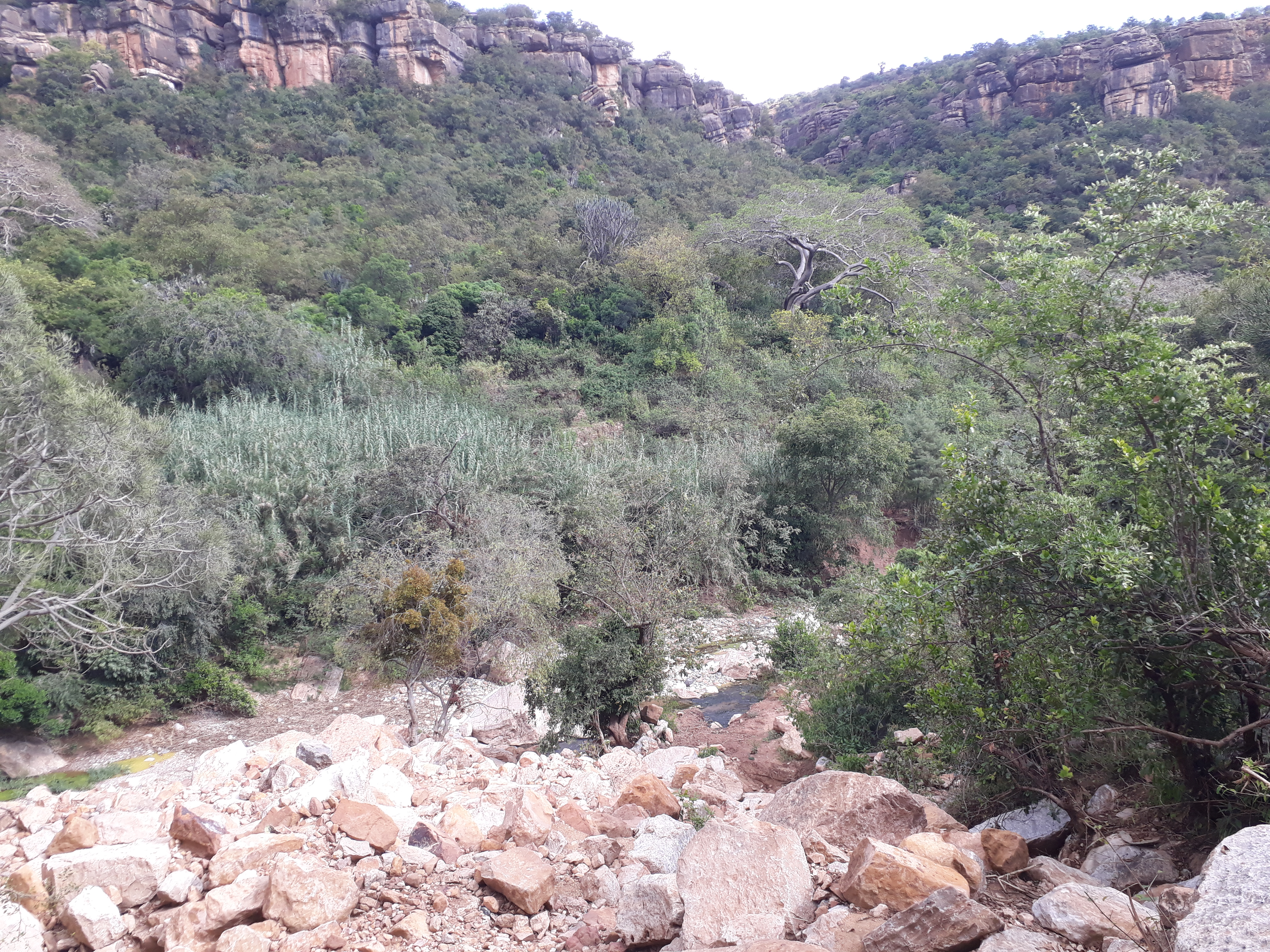
Gestet forest

Its mountainous nature and proximity to Mekelle makes the tabia fit for tourism.

=== Geotouristic sites ===
The high variability of geological formations and the rugged topography invites for geological and geographic tourism or "geotourism". Geosites in the tabia include:

- The Giba gorge with its incense trees
- May Hib'o cave
- Large rockfall west of Addi Lihtsi
- Traditional agroforestry in Segenet

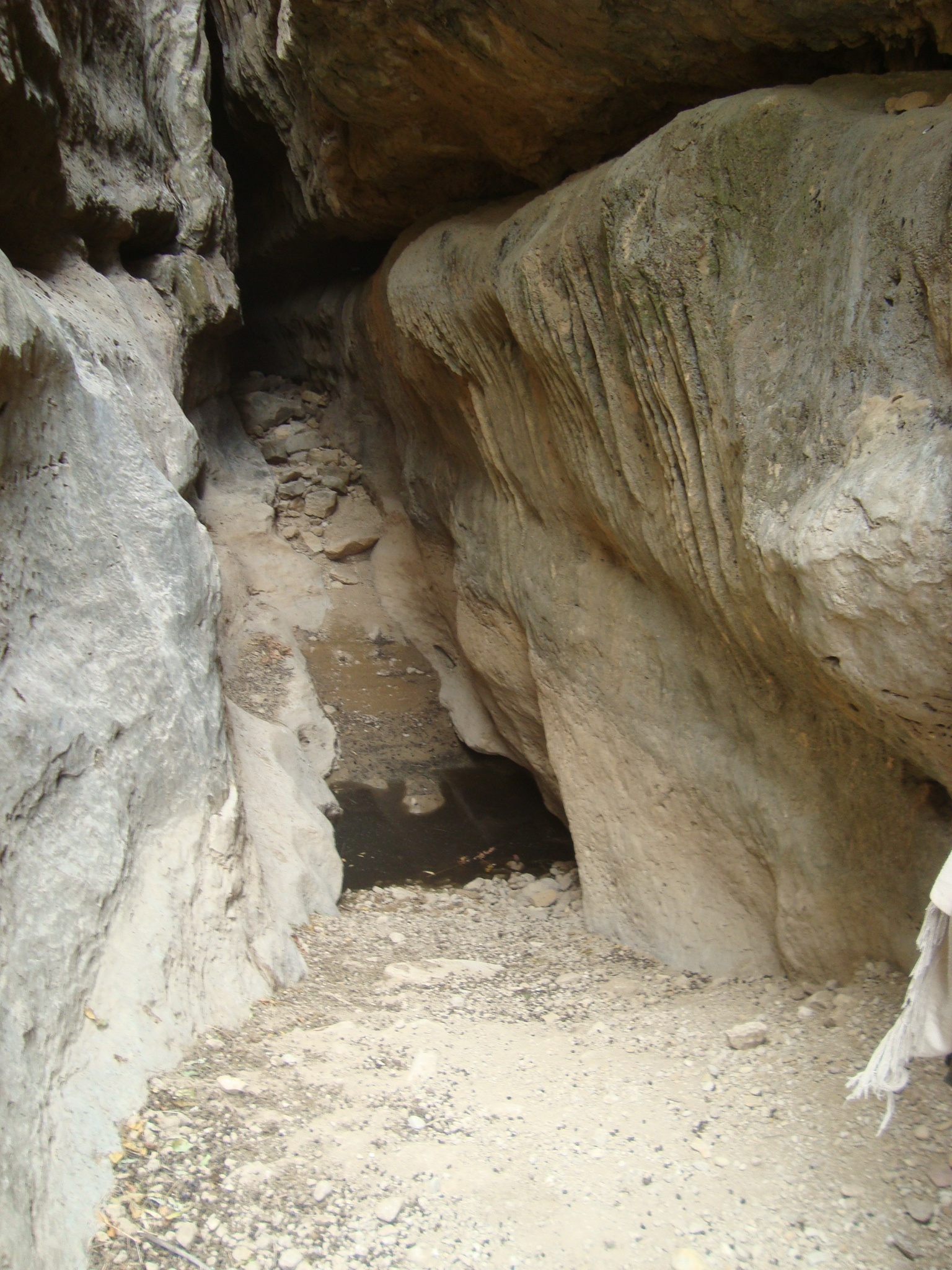
May Hib'o cave

=== Birdwatching ===
Birdwatching (for the species, see the main Dogu'a Tembien page) can be done particularly in exclosures and forests. The following bird-watching sites have been inventoried in the tabia and mapped.

- Abune Aregawi church forest
- Slope forests in Addi Qeshofo

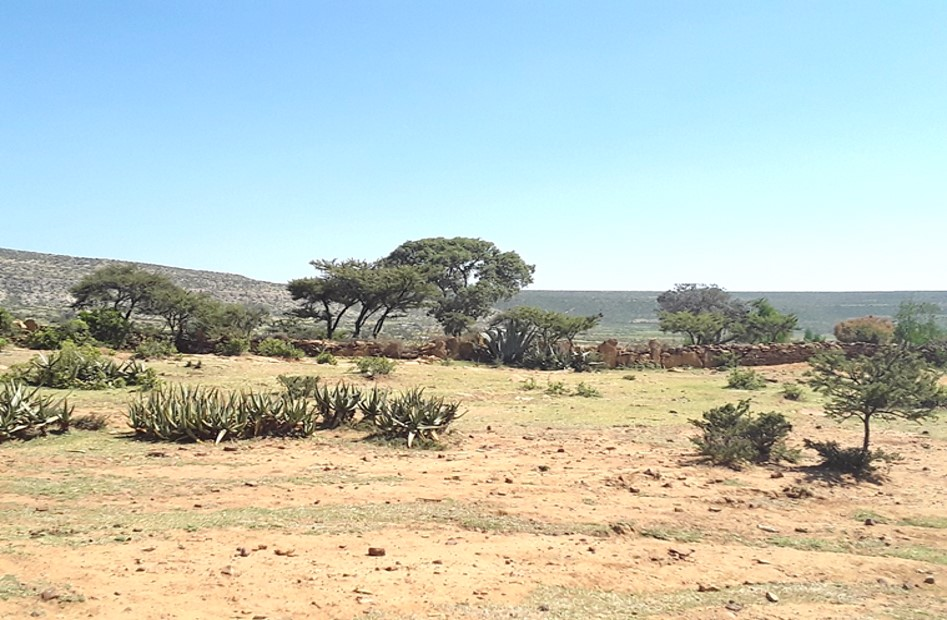
Along trek 16

=== Trekking routes ===
Trekking routes have been established in this tabia. The tracks are not marked on the ground but can be followed using downloaded .GPX files.

- Trek 15, from north to south across the tabia into Giba gorge
- Trek 16, from Rubaksa (Mika'el Abiy) across Segenet and May Genet to Togogwa (Debre Nazret) (10 km)
- Trek 18, from the old bridge on Giba River in Debre Nazret, up to the plateau and then westbound along the northern shoulder of the Giba Gorge to Addi Lihtsi (20 km)

Loops allow detailed visits of Addi Lihtsi village and its incense landscapes

=== Inda Siwa, the local beer houses ===
In the main villages, there are traditional beer houses (Inda Siwa), often in unique settings, which are a good place for resting and chatting with the local people. Most renown are in May Genet:

- Medhin Hayelom
- Hadash Mebrahten
- Indanuguse Alemayehu

=== Accommodation and facilities ===
The facilities are very basic. One may be invited to spend the night in a rural homestead or ask permission to pitch a tent. Hotels are available in Hagere Selam and Mekelle. Rooms are for rent in the nearby Togogwa (Debre Nazret), a place that hosts pilgrims on their way to the Dabba Hadera monastery.

== More detailed information ==
For more details on environment, agriculture, rural sociology, hydrology, ecology, culture, etc., see the overall page on the Dogu'a Tembien district.
