= Exclosure =

Area protected from livestock grazing

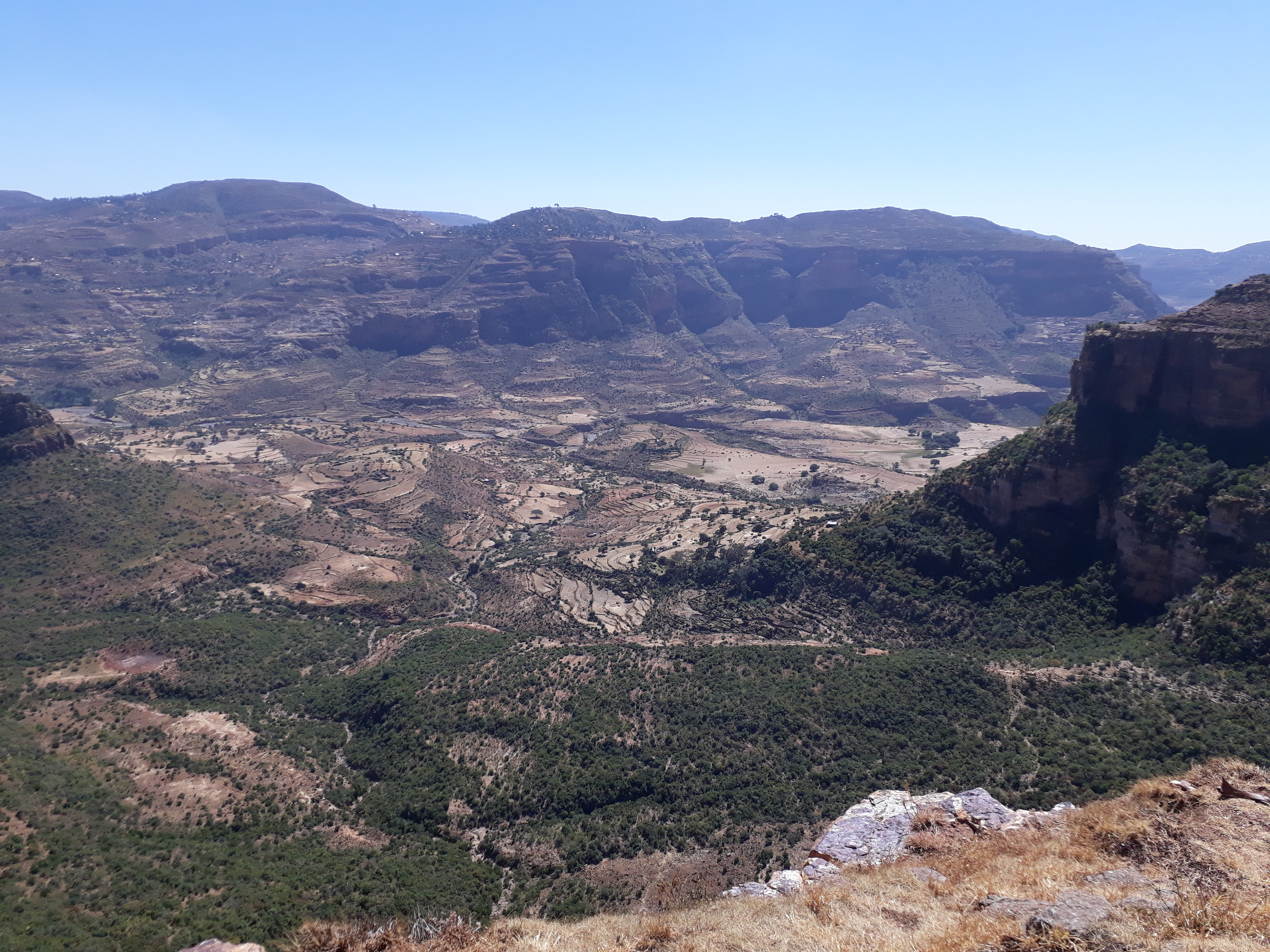
Ruba Dirho exclosure in Tigray

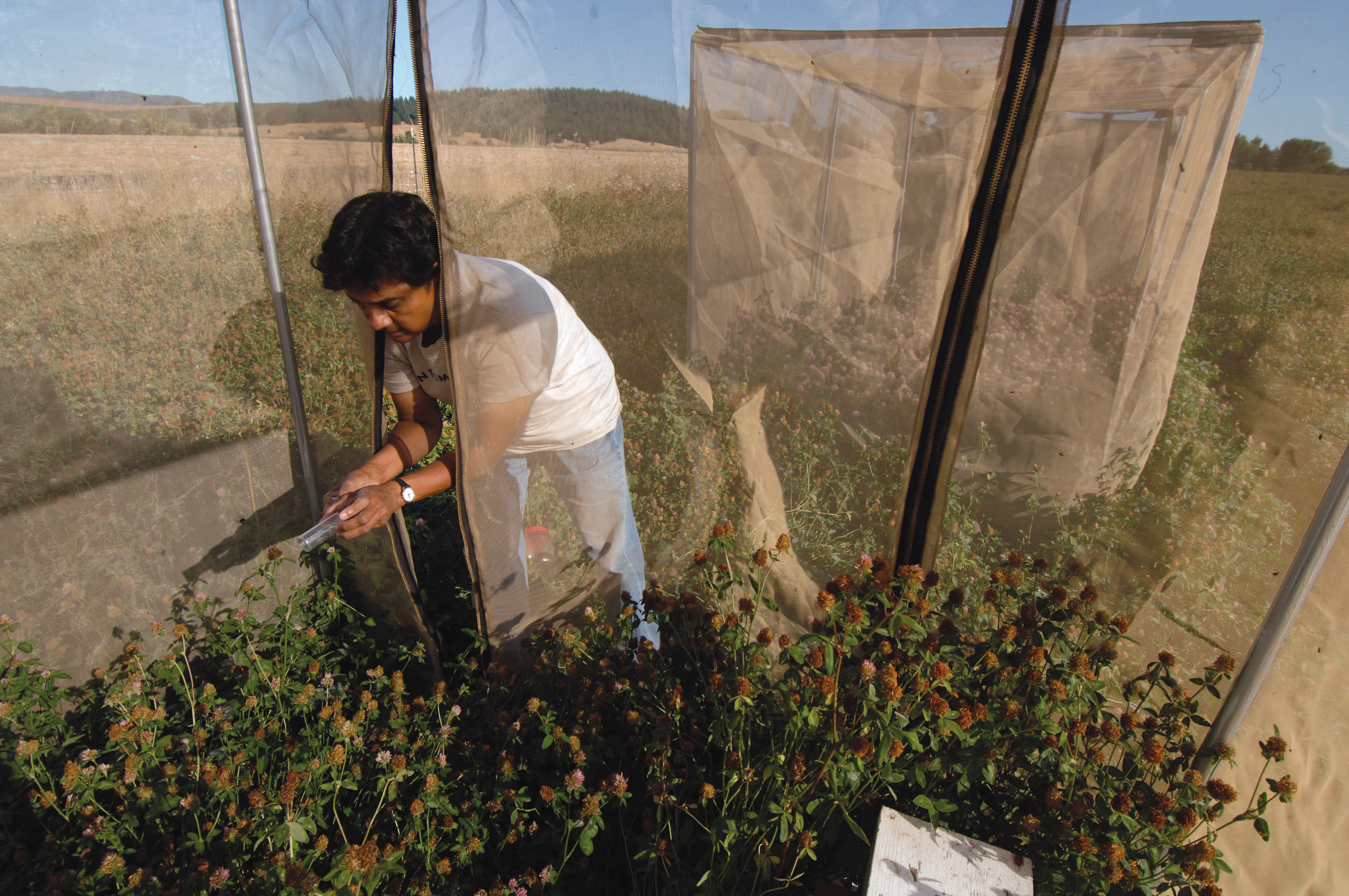
An insect exclosure used to investigate pollination. A specific bee species is inserted into the exclosure with no other pollinators present.

An exclosure, in an area being used extensively for grazing, is a limited area from which unwanted browsing animals, such as domestic cattle or wildlife such as deer, are excluded by fencing or other means.

== Environmental protection ==
Most commonly, exclosures are areas that are set aside for regreening. Wood harvesting and livestock range are not allowed there.

=== Effects on environment ===
The establishment of an exclosure has positive effects on:

- biodiversity
- water infiltration
- protection from flooding
- sediment deposition
- carbon sequestration

=== Economic benefits ===
In developing countries, people commonly have economic benefits from these exclosures through grass harvesting, beekeeping and other non-timber forest products. The local inhabitants also consider it as “land set aside for future generations”.

=== Carbon credits ===
Exclosures have as an additional benefit that the surrounding communities may receive carbon credits for the sequestered CO_{2}, as part of a carbon offset programme. In the Tigray Region, in Ethiopia, several exclosures are managed by the EthioTrees project. The revenues are then reinvested in the villages, according to the priorities of the communities; it may be for an additional class in the village school, a water pond, conservation in the exclosures, or a store for incense.

== Range management ==
Exclosures are sometimes constructed by government agencies that manage livestock use on public lands—a practice in which private owners of cattle pay, though often only a nominal sum, for the right to graze their livestock on the public lands.

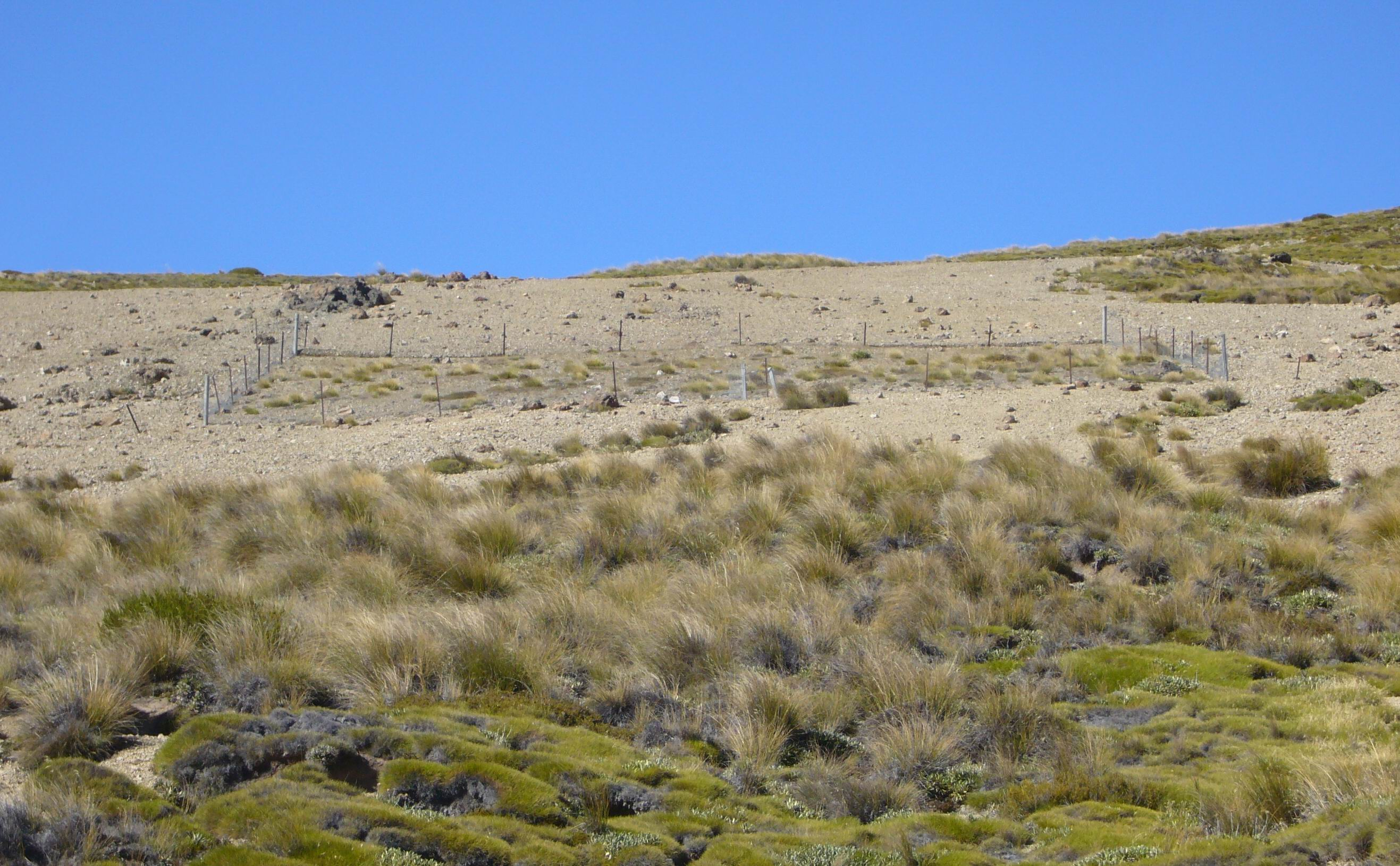
An exclusion plot on Island Saddle in the South Island of New Zealand. Introduced browsing mammals often have a detrimental effect on New Zealand's native vegetation.

== Experimental sites ==
One purpose of the exclosure is to determine how the area would develop (in biodiversity, vegetation height, ecological characteristics, etc.) if grazing were not conducted.

== Protection of humans ==
Another purpose is to demarcate an area safe for humans by excluding potentially deadly animals. For example, a beach may have a shark net around it to prevent sharks from attacking human swimmers. Another example is at wild animal preserves which provide fenced in areas for humans to safely watch lions, tigers, or other large predators.

== See also ==
- Predator proof fence
