= Hagere Selam (Degua Tembien) =

Town in north Ethiopia

Hagere Selam ሃገረ ሰላም May Aleqti, Idaga Hamus
- Town
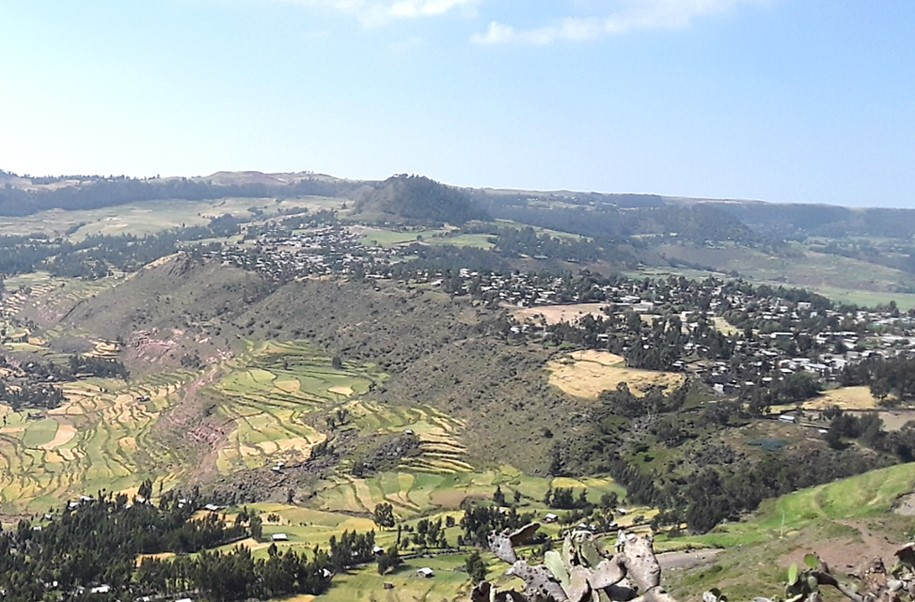

- Location within Ethiopia Hagere Selam (Ethiopia)
- Coordinates: 13°39′N 39°10′E
- Country: Ethiopia
- Region: Tigray
- Zone: Maekelay (Central)
- Woreda: Dogu'a Tembien

Area
  - Total: 5.22 km^{2} (2.02 sq mi)
- Elevation: 2,625 m (8,612 ft)

Population (2007)
  - Total: 8,130
  - Density: 1,557/km^{2} (4,030/sq mi)
- Time zone: UTC+3 (EAT)

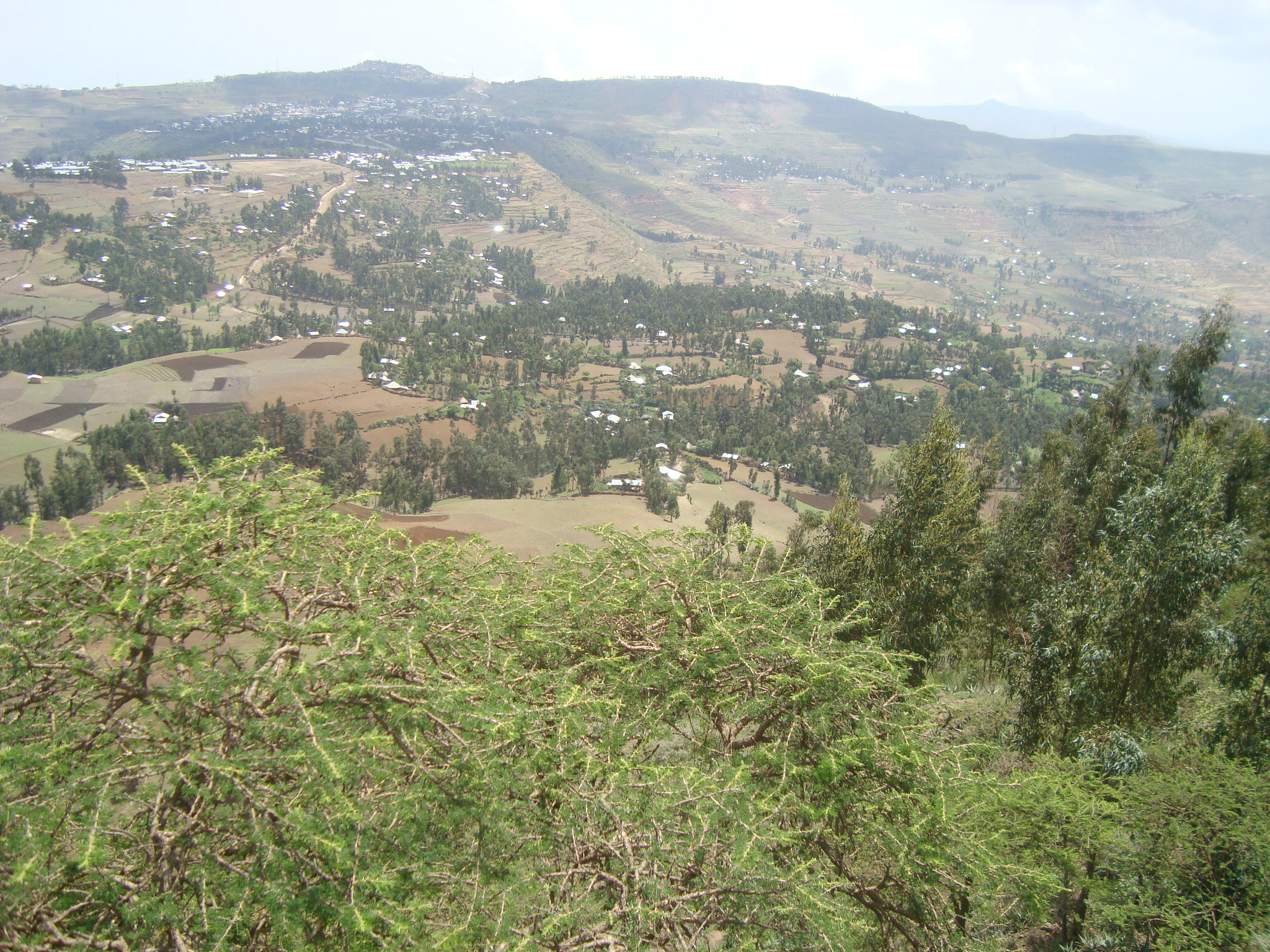
The southern 'suburbs' of Hagere Selam belong to the village of Dingilet

Hagere Selam (Tigrinya: ሃገረ ሰላም) is a town in northern Ethiopia. Located on the Mekelle-Abiy Addi regional road, it is located at an elevation of 2650 metres above sea level. The town is the administrative center of the Dogu'a Tembien woreda. The weekly market is on Saturdays.

Hagere Selam is located on the saddle point between two of the higher points in Tigray (Imba Zuw'ala and Tsatsen). The regional road from Mekelle to Abiy Addi climbs towards Hagere Selam, before going down to the Abergele lowlands. The area is categorized as highland or dega. The local economy is dependent on trading, agriculture, with barley being the main crop grown in the area, and on milk production and apiculture.

== Demographics ==
Based on figures from the census in 2007, Hagere Selam had a total population of 8,130 of whom 3,702 were men and 4,428 were women. The 1994 census reported a total population of 3,932. The functional agglomeration of Hagere Selam is larger than its administrative boundaries, as urban houses are also built on adjacent land of nearby villages Dingilet, Harena and Melfa.

== Water ==
Given its upper position in the landscape, the town suffers from endemic water shortages. A small reservoir was built at the southern side of the town for sake of irrigation in Addi Selam, but it has been silted up because of erosion during road works.

== Religion and churches ==
Almost all inhabitants are Orthodox Christians. There are two churches in Hagere Selam: Medhane Alem and Tsion.

== Schools ==
Almost all children of the town are schooled, though in some schools there is lack of classrooms, directly related to the large intake in primary schools over the last decades. Schools in Hagere Selam include Addi Selam TVET (technical and vocational school) and Hagere Selam High School.

== History ==
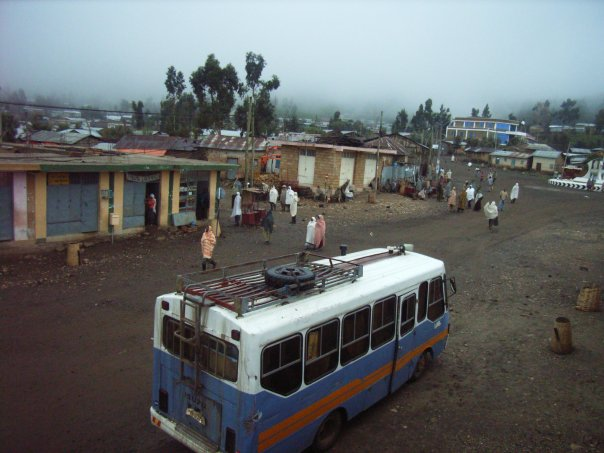
Hagere Selam around 2010

The history of Hagere Selam is strongly confounded with the history of Tembien. For a long time, Melfa, west of Hagere Selam, was the capital of Tembien; later on, the administration was established in Abiy Addi as it was easier of access.

In 1951, Gebru Gebrehiwot, the new governor, decided to create a new capital of Tembien. First the location of Melfa was chosen. As the inhabitants of Melfa rejected the idea, Hagere Selam was created as a new town. It used already to be an open air market place (hence the name "Idaga Hamus" or Thursday market) – the place was a strategically located mountain saddle, also called "May Aleqti". The new town grew then from the pre-existing settlements May Aleqti and Addi Hailom. In practice, the capital remained in Abiy Addi. It was only after the district of Dogu’a Tembien was created that Hagere Selam started to grow. Basic modern infrastructure (electricity, tap water) came only in the early years 2000. Starting 2016, a new settlement was established in a nearby location called Addi Selam.

During the 2020-2021 Tigray War, massacres were carried out in Hagere Selam by the Ethiopian and Eritrean armies, and the town was looted for two days by Eritrean soldiers. A fire was detected during the night of Dec. 15-16 within Hagere Selam town. An EEPA report stated that this corroborated reports of ongoing attacks in the area. On 21 December 2020, an EEPA report stated that ENDF soldiers killed ‘many’ in Hagere Selam. They had come to the town to take revenge after they lost a battle against Tigray Defence Forces. In the subsequent days the town Hagere Selam was ‘entirely’ looted by Eritrean soldiers fighting on the side of the ENDF. They went door to door, forcing their way in and taking what they could. In Hagere Selam there was no water and little food and the hospital was in a dire situation as medical supplies were running critically low. It could not refer patients to the main Ayder referral hospital in Mekelle.

== Tourism ==
Its mountainous nature and proximity to Mekelle makes the area fit for tourism. Attractions include viewpoints at Ksad Addi Amyuq, fortifications of the Derg army on Imba Zuw'ala, and previous headquarters of TPLF in caves in neighbouring Mahbere Sillasie. The high variability of geological formations and the rugged topography invites for geological and geographic tourism. Most geosites are located in surrounding area, but at the outskirts of Hagere Selam one finds:

- Bi'en ridge
- Kulliheni gully (created after road building)
- Addi Selam Vertisols
- Luvisol quarries
- Columnar basalt
- Imba Khoboro viewpoint

== Climate ==
Climate data for Hagere Selam, elevation 2,840 m (9,320 ft), (1971–2000)
Month	Jan	Feb	Mar	Apr	May	Jun	Jul	Aug	Sep	Oct	Nov	Dec	Year
Mean daily maximum °C (°F)	20.0 (68.0)	18.3 (64.9)	18.3 (64.9)	18.0 (64.4)	17.5 (63.5)	15.8 (60.4)	14.8 (58.6)	15.0 (59.0)	15.8 (60.4)	16.5 (61.7)	16.8 (62.2)	17.8 (64.0)	17.1 (62.7)
Mean daily minimum °C (°F)	7.7 (45.9)	8.1 (46.6)	8.4 (47.1)	8.8 (47.8)	8.8 (47.8)	7.8 (46.0)	7.7 (45.9)	6.6 (43.9)	7.5 (45.5)	7.8 (46.0)	7.5 (45.5)	6.9 (44.4)	7.8 (46.0)
Average precipitation mm (inches)	55.0 (2.17)	98.0 (3.86)	88.0 (3.46)	134.0 (5.28)	131.0 (5.16)	109.0 (4.29)	124.0 (4.88)	119.0 (4.69)	113.0 (4.45)	148.0 (5.83)	88.0 (3.46)	21.0 (0.83)	1,228 (48.36)
Average relative humidity (%)	62	60	65	75	77	80	80	77	81	71	70	58	71
Source: FAO
