= Soil in Dogu'a Tembien =

- Stratigraphic range: Holocene
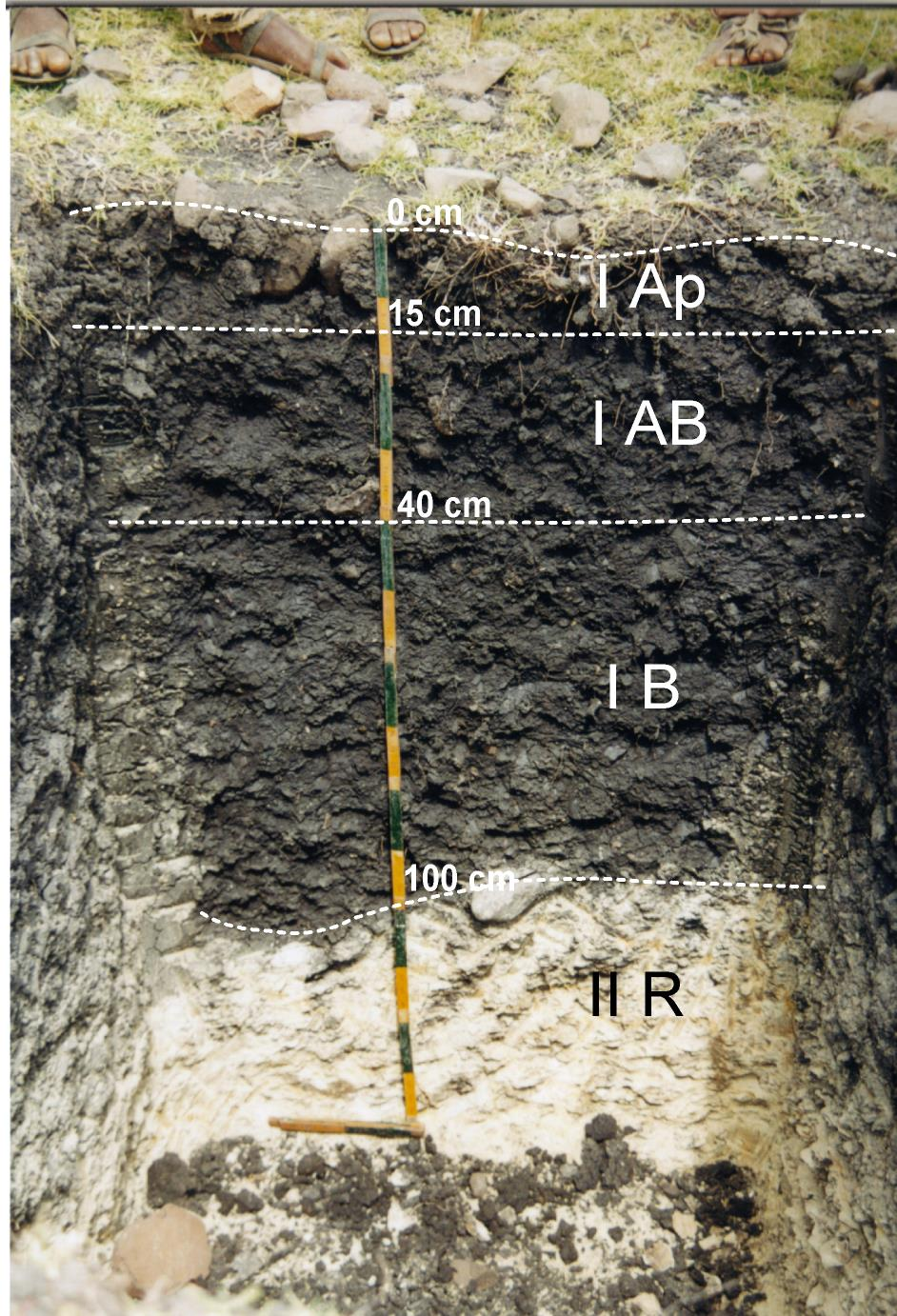
- Mazi-Pellic Vertisol in the Hagere Selam Highlands
- Type: Soilscape
- Thickness: 2 m (6.6 ft)

Lithology
- Primary: Clay, Loam
- Other: Sand, Rocks

Location
- Coordinates: 13.5°N 39.16°E
- Region: Tigray
- Country: Ethiopia
- Extent: Dogu'a Tembien
- Soil in Dogu'a Tembien (Ethiopia)

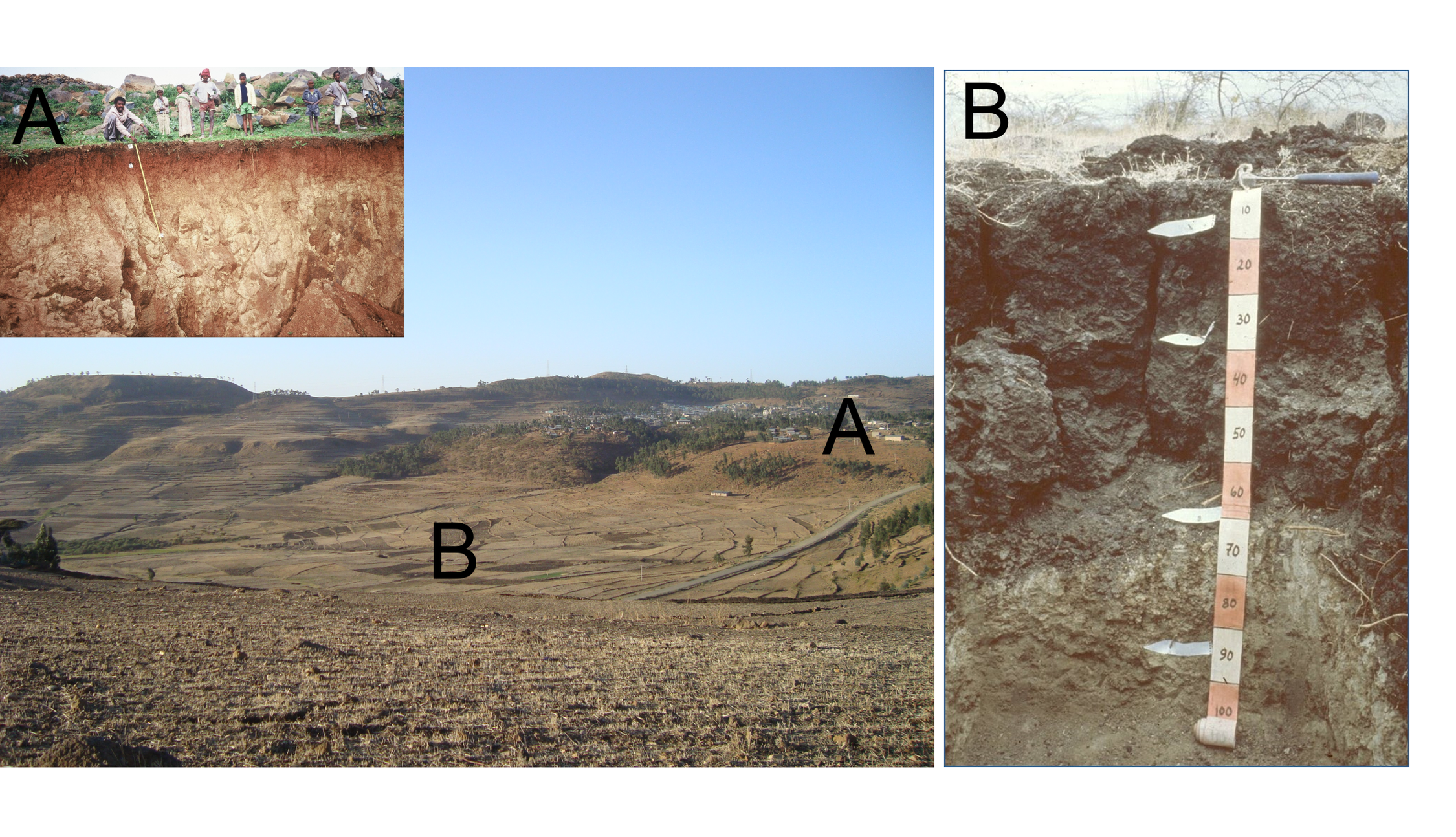
Red-black soil catena in Addi Selam (Hagere Selam Highlands) - A is Luvisol and B is Vertisol

The soils of the Dogu'a Tembien woreda (district) in Tigray (Ethiopia) reflect its longstanding agricultural history, highly seasonal rainfall regime, relatively low temperatures, an extremely great variety in lithology (with dominance of basalts and limestone) and steep slopes. Outstanding features in the soilscape are the fertile highland Vertisols and Phaeozems in forests.

== Factors contributing to soil diversity ==
=== Climate ===
Annual rainfall depth is very variable with an average of around 800 mm. Most rains fall during the main rainy season, which typically extends from June to September. Mean temperature in woreda town Hagere Selam is 16.8 °C, oscillating between average daily minimum of 9.3 °C and maximum of 24.1 °C. The contrasts between day and night air temperatures are much larger than seasonal contrasts.

=== Geology ===
From the higher to the lower locations, the following geological formations are present:

- Phonolite plugs
- Upper basalt
- Interbedded lacustrine deposits
- Lower basalt
- Amba Aradam Formation
- Agula Shale
- Mekelle Dolerite
- Antalo Limestone
- Adigrat Sandstone
- Enticho Sandstone
- Edaga Arbi Glacials
- Quaternary alluvium and freshwater tufa

=== Topography ===
As part of the Ethiopian Highlands the land has undergone a rapid tectonic uplift, leading the occurrence of mountain peaks, plateaus, valleys and gorges.

=== Land use ===
Generally speaking the level lands and intermediate slopes are occupied by cropland, while there is rangeland and shrubs on the steeper slopes. Remnant forests occur around Orthodox Christian churches and a few inaccessible places. A recent trend is the widespread planting of eucalyptus trees.

=== Environmental changes ===
Soil degradation in this district became important when humans started deforestation almost 5000 years ago. Depending on land use history, locations have been exposed in varying degrees to such land degradation.

== Geomorphic regions and soil units ==
Given the complex geology and topography of the district, it has been organised into land systems - areas with specific and unique geomorphic and geological characteristics, characterised by a particular soil distribution along the soil catena. Soil types are classified in line with World Reference Base for Soil Resources and reference made to main characteristics that can be observed in the field.

=== Hagere Selam Highlands ===
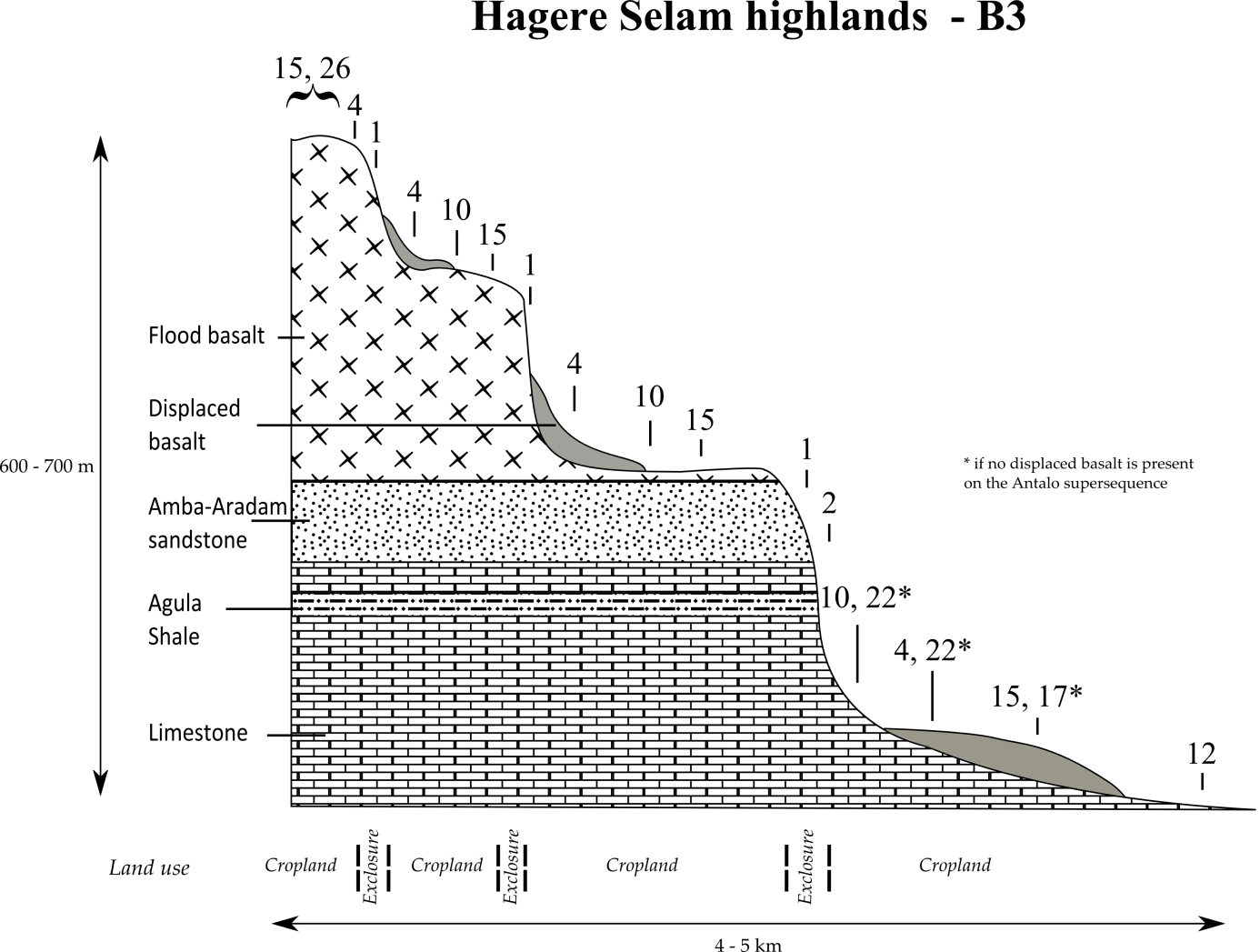
Typical catena in the Hagere Selam highlands

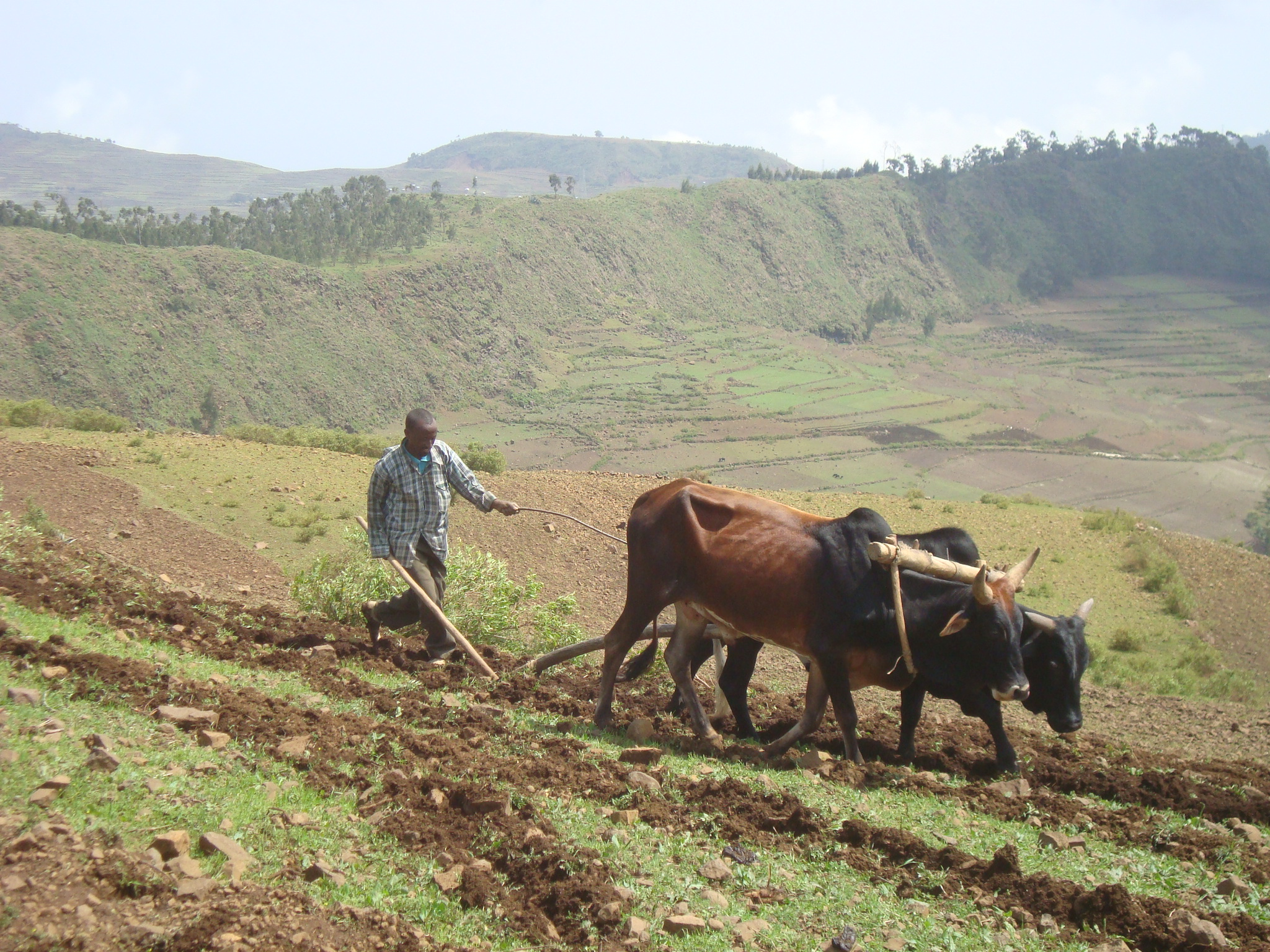
Luvisol in Dingilet

This land system occurs on the central basalt plateau and adjacent ridges; Hagere Selam is entirely in this land system, which is also predominant in tabias Selam, Mahbere Sillasie, Melfa, Lim'at, Seret, Simret, Mika'el Abiy as well as Arebay.

- Associated soil types
  - shallow, very stony, silt loamy to loamy soils (Skeletic Cambisol, Leptic Cambisol, Skeletic Regosol) (4)
  - moderately deep dark stony clays with good natural fertility (Vertic Cambisol) (10)
  - deep, dark cracking clays, temporarily waterlogged during the wet season (Pellic Vertisol) (15)
- Inclusions
  - Rock outcrops and very shallow soils (Lithic Leptosol) (1)
  - Rock outcrops and very shallow soils on limestone (Calcaric Leptosol) (2)
  - Moderately deep, stony, dark cracking clays on calcaric material (Calcaric Vertic Cambisol) (17)
  - Deep dark cracking clays with very good natural fertility, waterlogged during the wet season (Chromic Vertisol, Pellic Vertisol) (12)
  - Shallow stony dark loams on calcaric material (Calcaric Regosol, Calcaric Cambisol) (22)
  - Brown loamy soils on basalt with good natural fertility (Luvisol) (26)

=== Gallery: soil profiles in the Hagere Selam Highlands ===
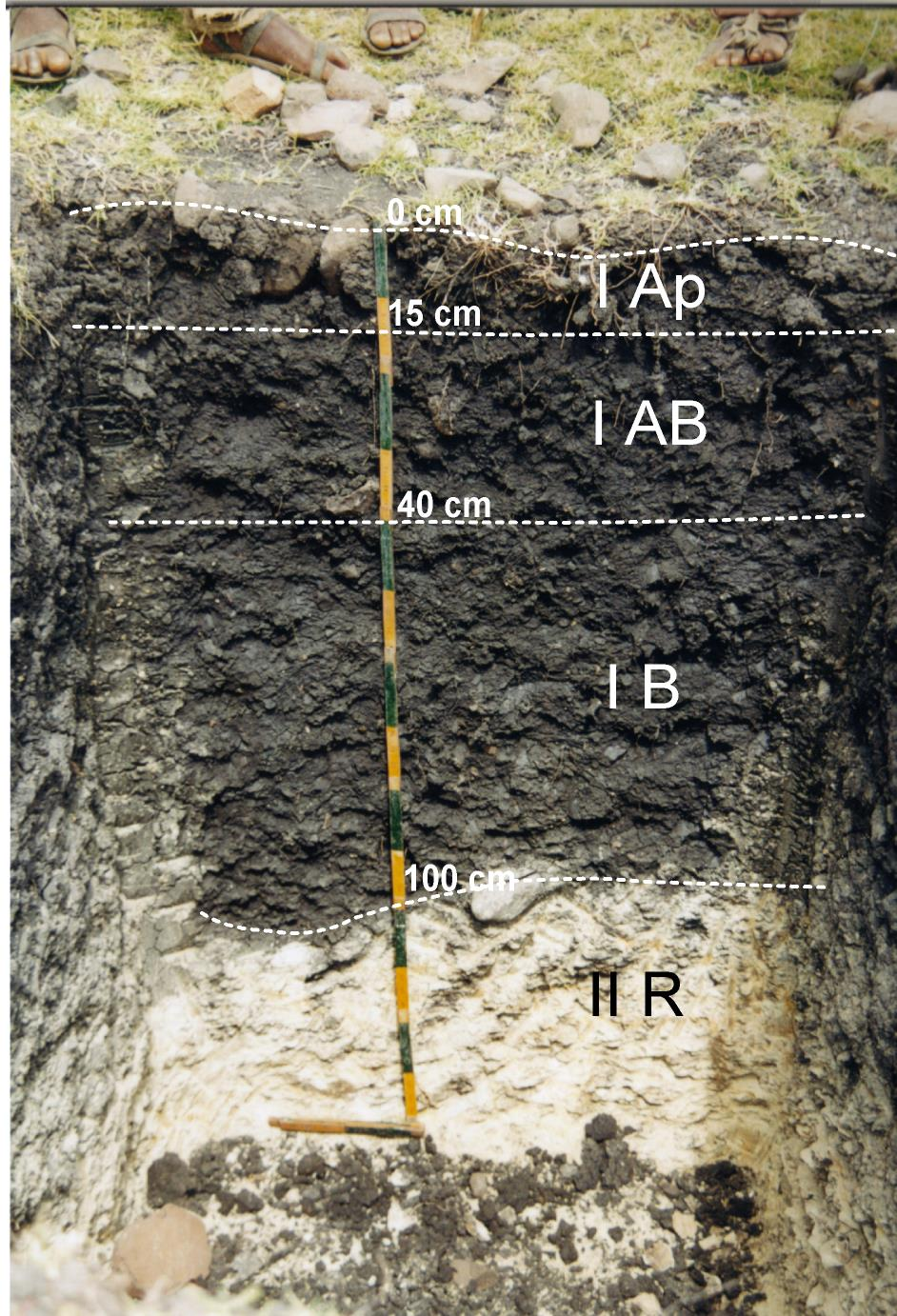
Mazi-Pellic Vertisol (Eutric) Thapto Haplic Leptosol at Mere'a Ziban

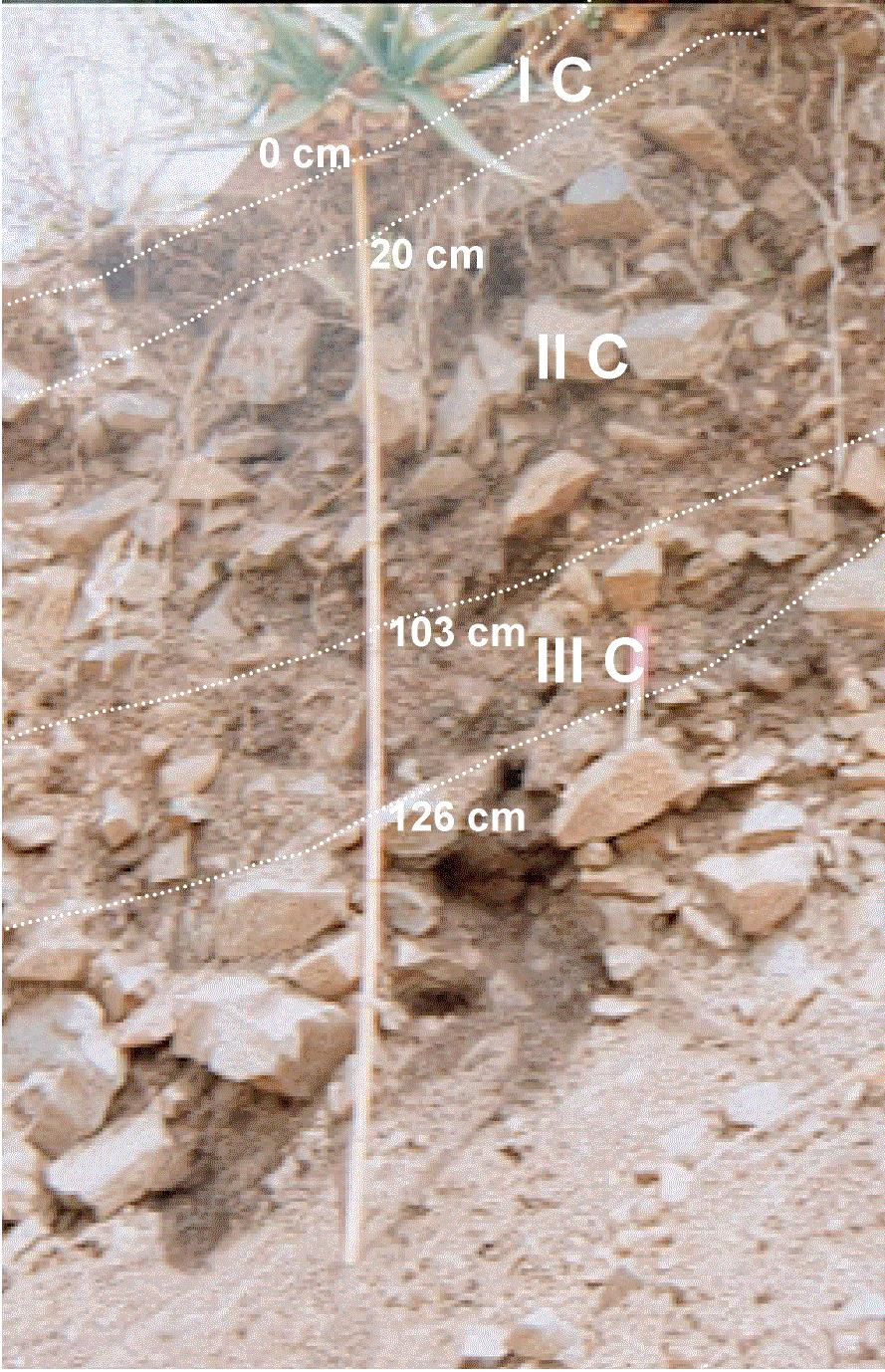
Humi-Cumuliskeletic Regosol in Kuliheni (Harena)

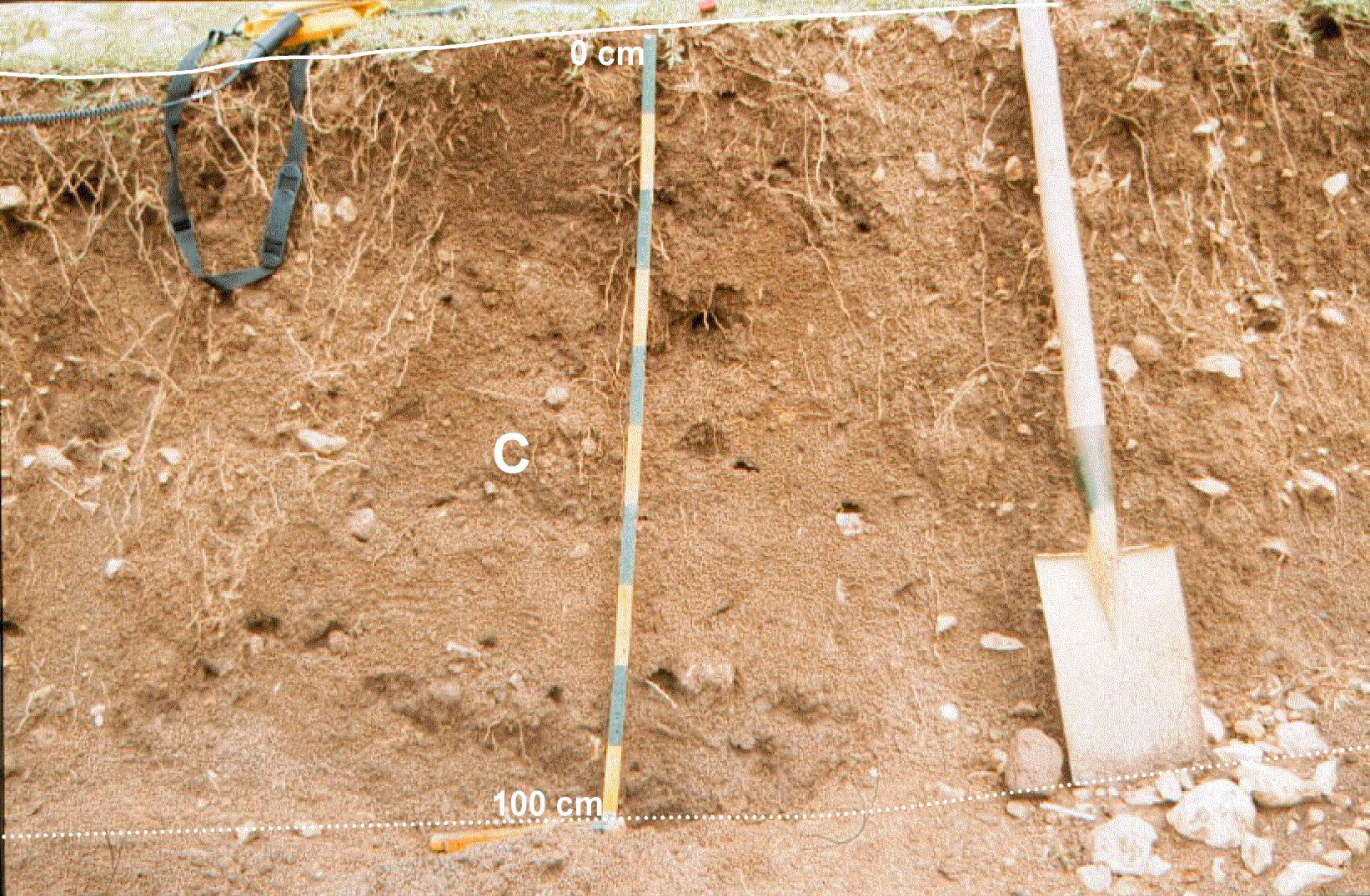
Humi-Cumulicalcaric Regosol in May Addi Abagie (Harena)

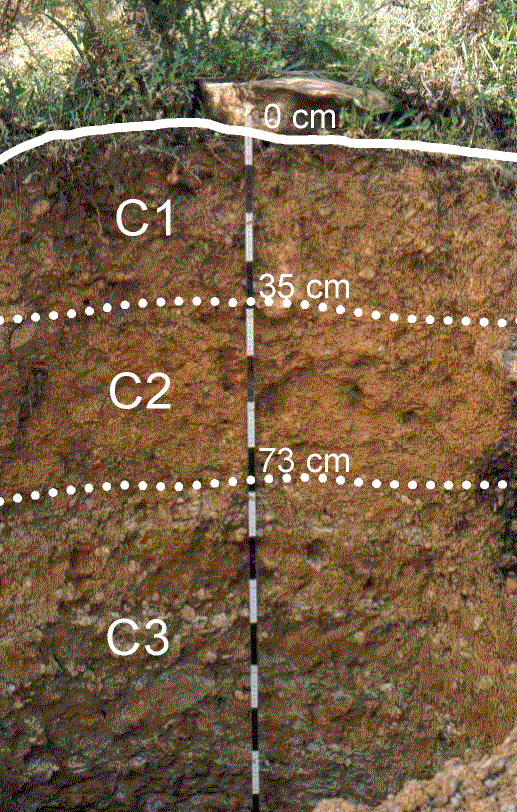
Calcaric Regosol in Luqmuts rangeland (Hech'i)

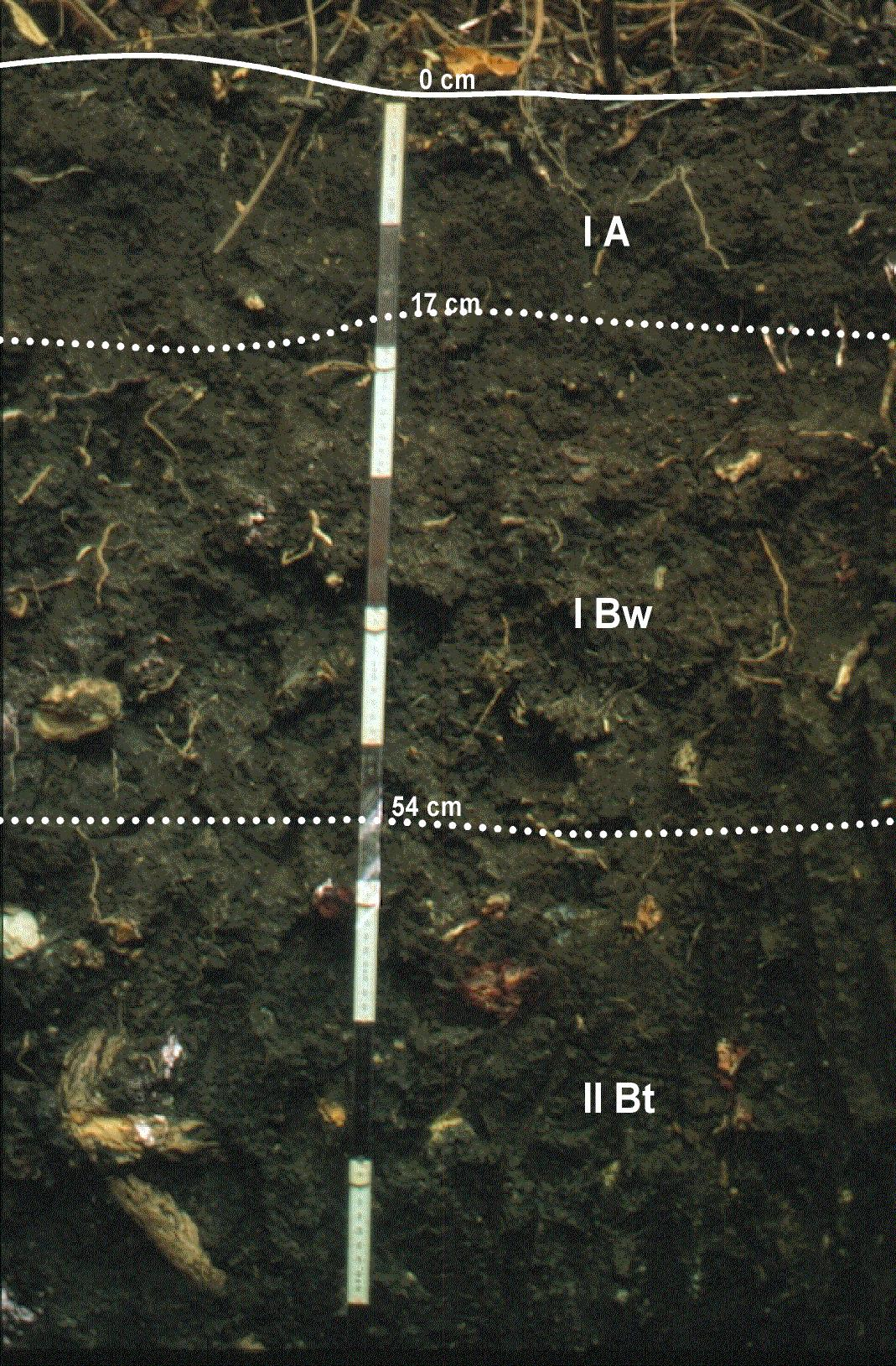
Luvic Phaeozem in Luqmuts forest (Hech'i)

=== Basalt plateau ===
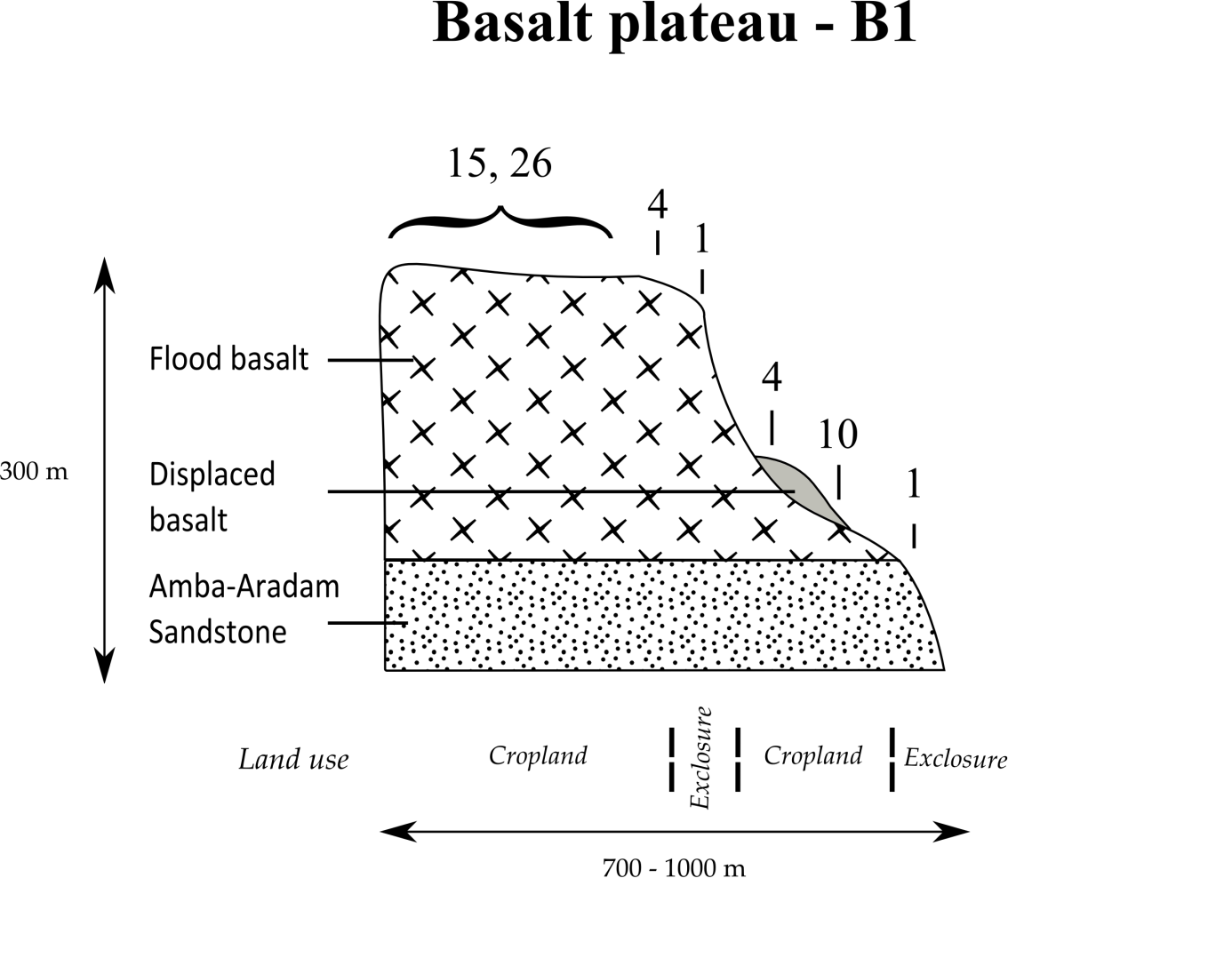
Typical catena on the Basalt plateau

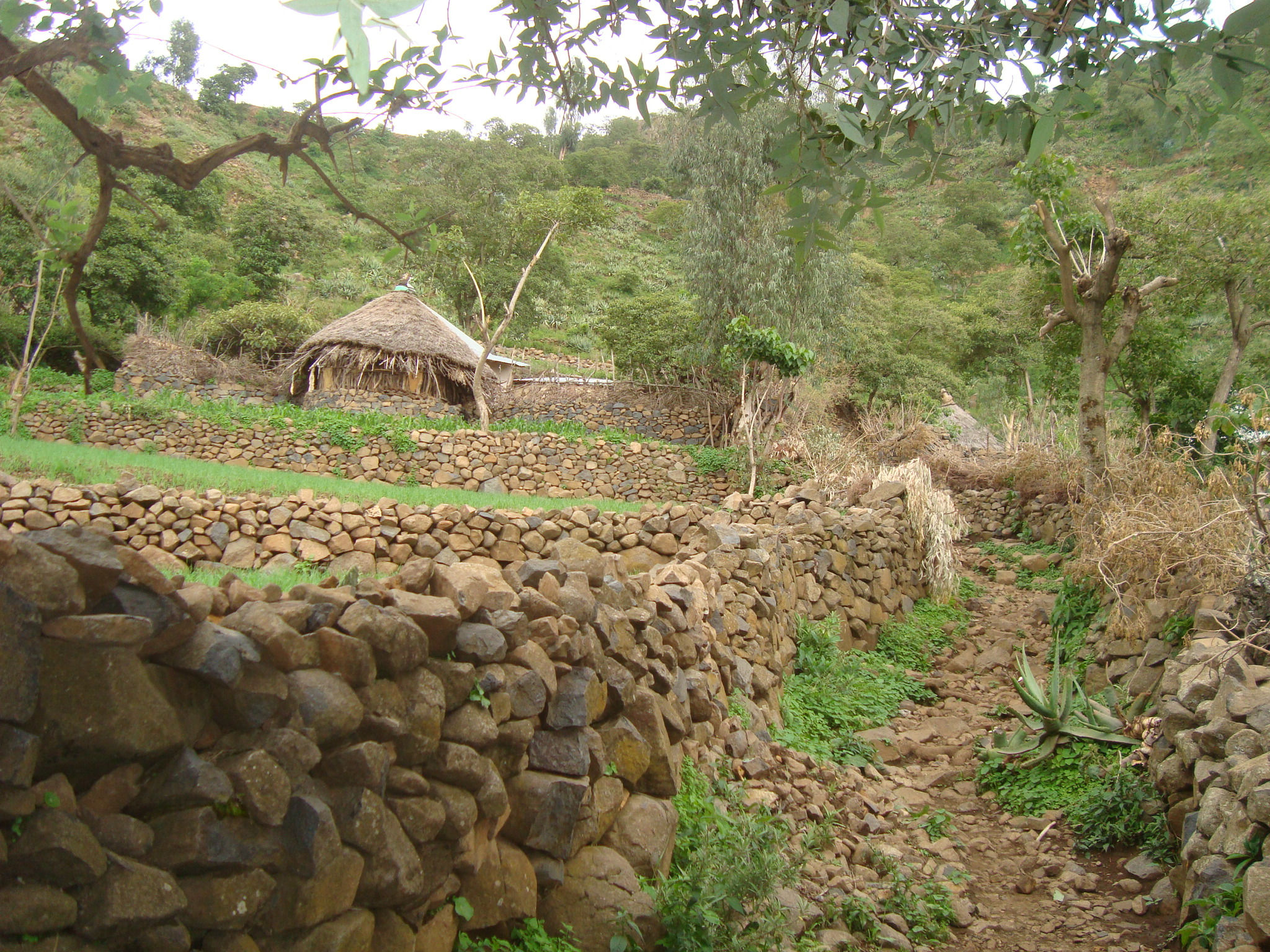
Gumuara village on the basalt plateau

This land system occurs on the westernmost ridges of Dogu'a Tembien, where basalt is overlying Adigrat Sandstone without intervening Antalo Limestone; it is predominant in tabias Menachek, Mizan, Aregen and Degol Woyane.

- Associated soil types
  - shallow, very stony, loamy soils (Leptic and Skeletic Cambisol and Regosol) (4)
  - deep, very dark clays with strong structure and very good natural fertility, temporarily waterlogged during the wet season (Vertisol) (15)
  - moderately deep, brown, loamy soils with a good natural fertility (Luvisol) (26)
- Inclusions
  - complex of rock outcrops, very stony and very shallow soils ((Lithic) Leptosol) (1)
  - moderately deep, stony, dark cracking clays (Vertic Cambisol) (10)

=== Adigrat Sandstone cliff and footslope ===
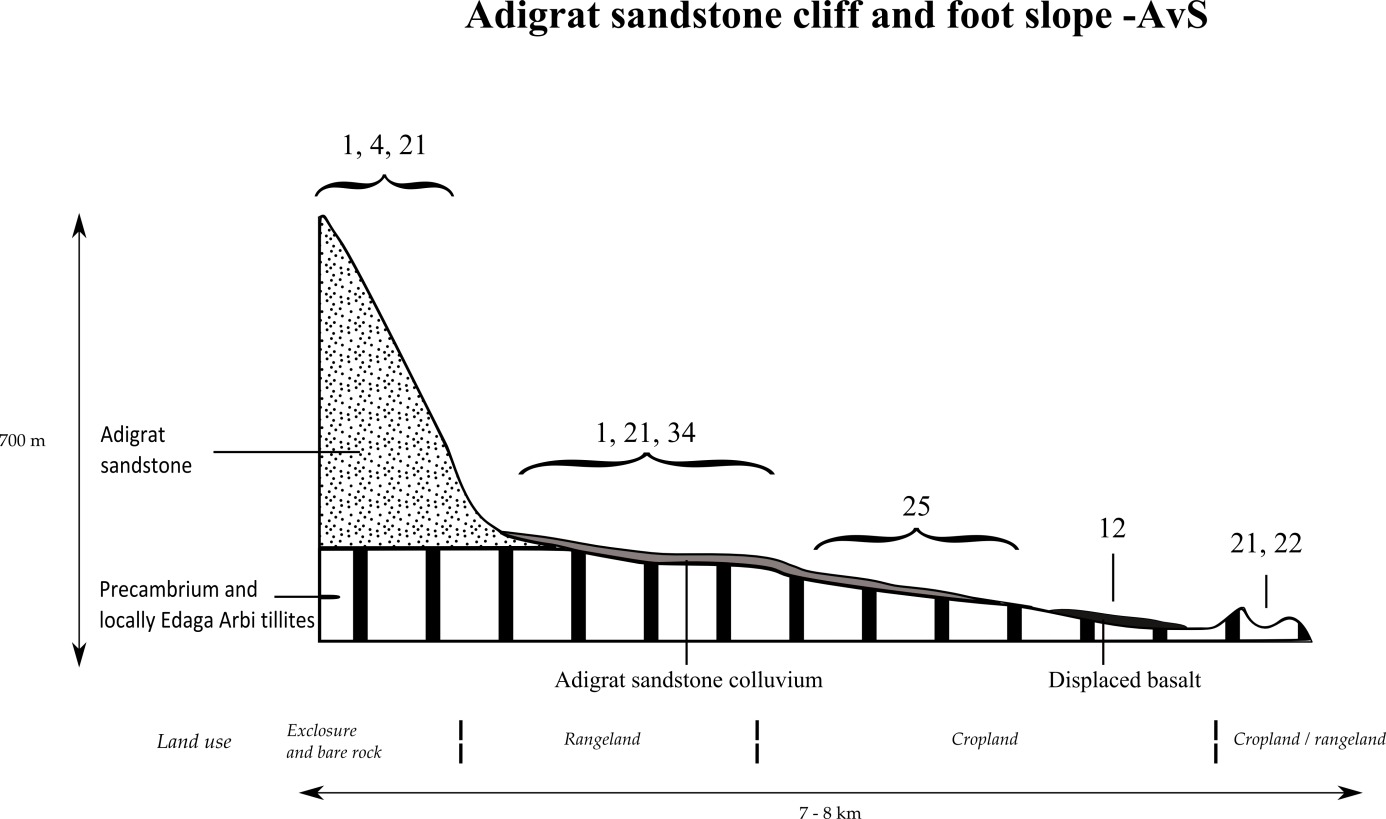
Typical catena on the Adigrat Sandstone cliff and footslope in and near Avergele

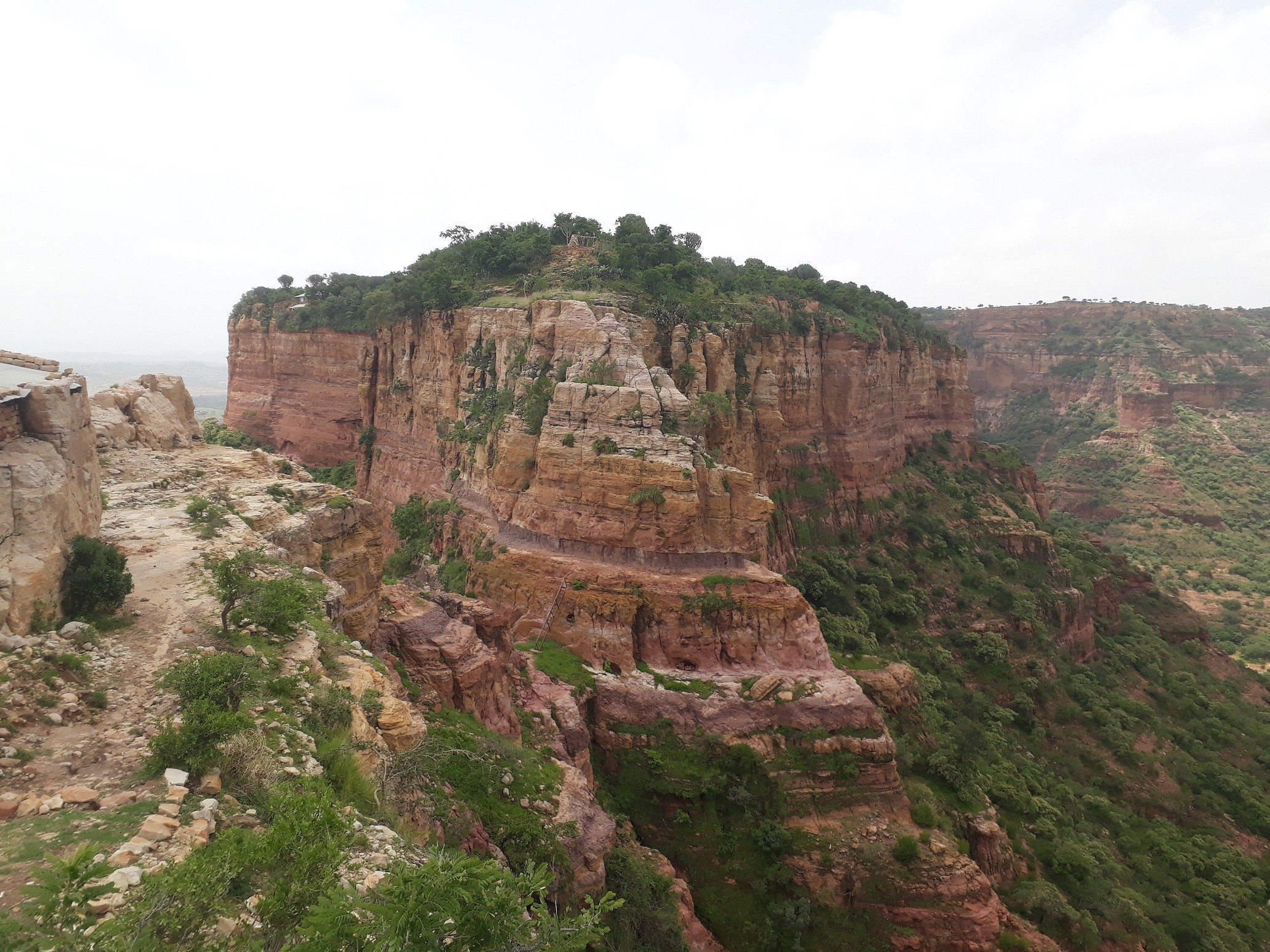
Lithic Leptosols around Dabba Selama monastery

This land system occurs on the steep slopes towards the southwestern lowlands; it occupies large areas of tabias Walta, Simret, Mizan, Aregen, Degol Woyane, Mahbere Sillasie and Haddinnet.

- Associated soil types
  - complex of rock outcrops, very stony and very shallow soils ((Lithic) Leptosol) (1)
  - shallow, stony sandy [[loam soils (Eutric Regosol and Cambisol) (21)
- Inclusions
  - shallow, dry soils with very high amounts of stones (Leptic and Skeletic Cambisol and Regosol) (4)
  - deep, dark cracking clays with good fertility, but problems of waterlogging (Chromic and Pellic Vertisol) (12)
  - soils with stagnating water due to an abrupt textural change such as sand over clay (Haplic Planosol]]) (34)

=== Alluvial plain of Giba River ===
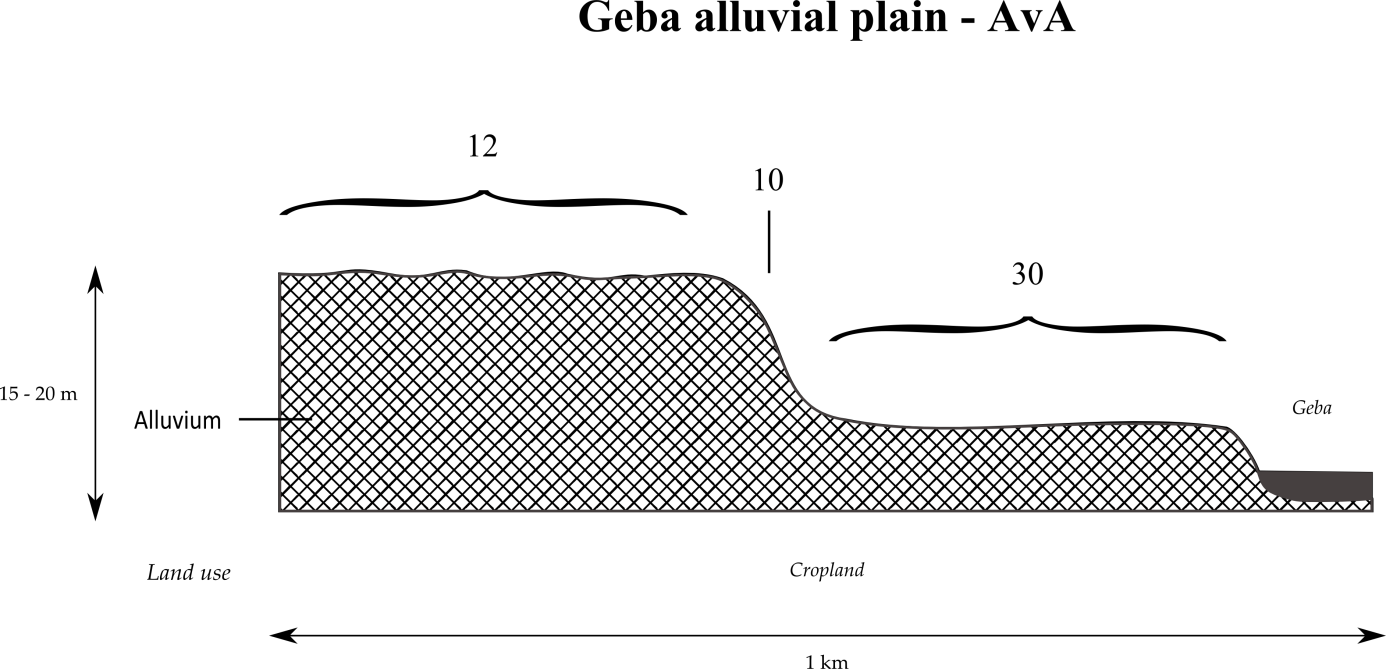
Typical catena in the alluvial plain of Giba River at the edge of Abergele

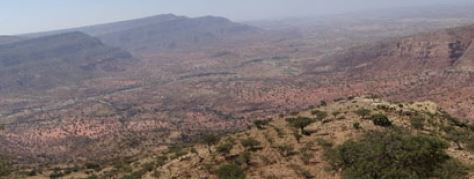
At Kemishana, the Giba River leaves its gorge and enters in the alluvial plain

This land system occurs in Kemishana at the southwestern side of Dogu'a Tembien, where the Giba River gorge widens up when entering into the Abergele lowlands.

- Associated soil types
  - deep dark cracking clays with very good natural fertility, waterlogged during the wet season (Chromic Vertisol, Pellic Vertisol) (12)
  - brown loamy sands developed on alluvium along Giba River (Fluvisol) (30)

=== Strongly incised Giba gorge ===
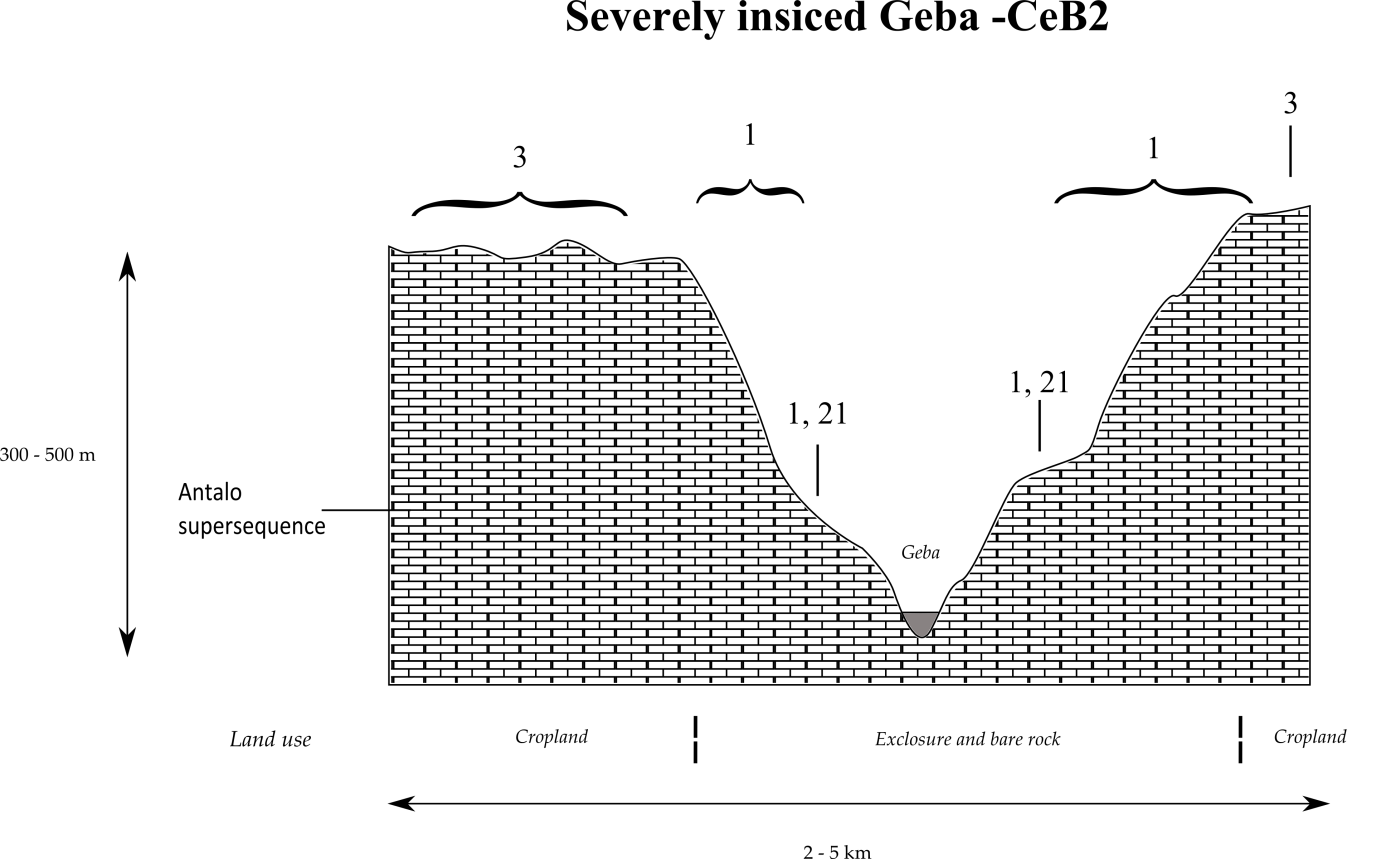
Typical catena in the severely incised Giba gorge

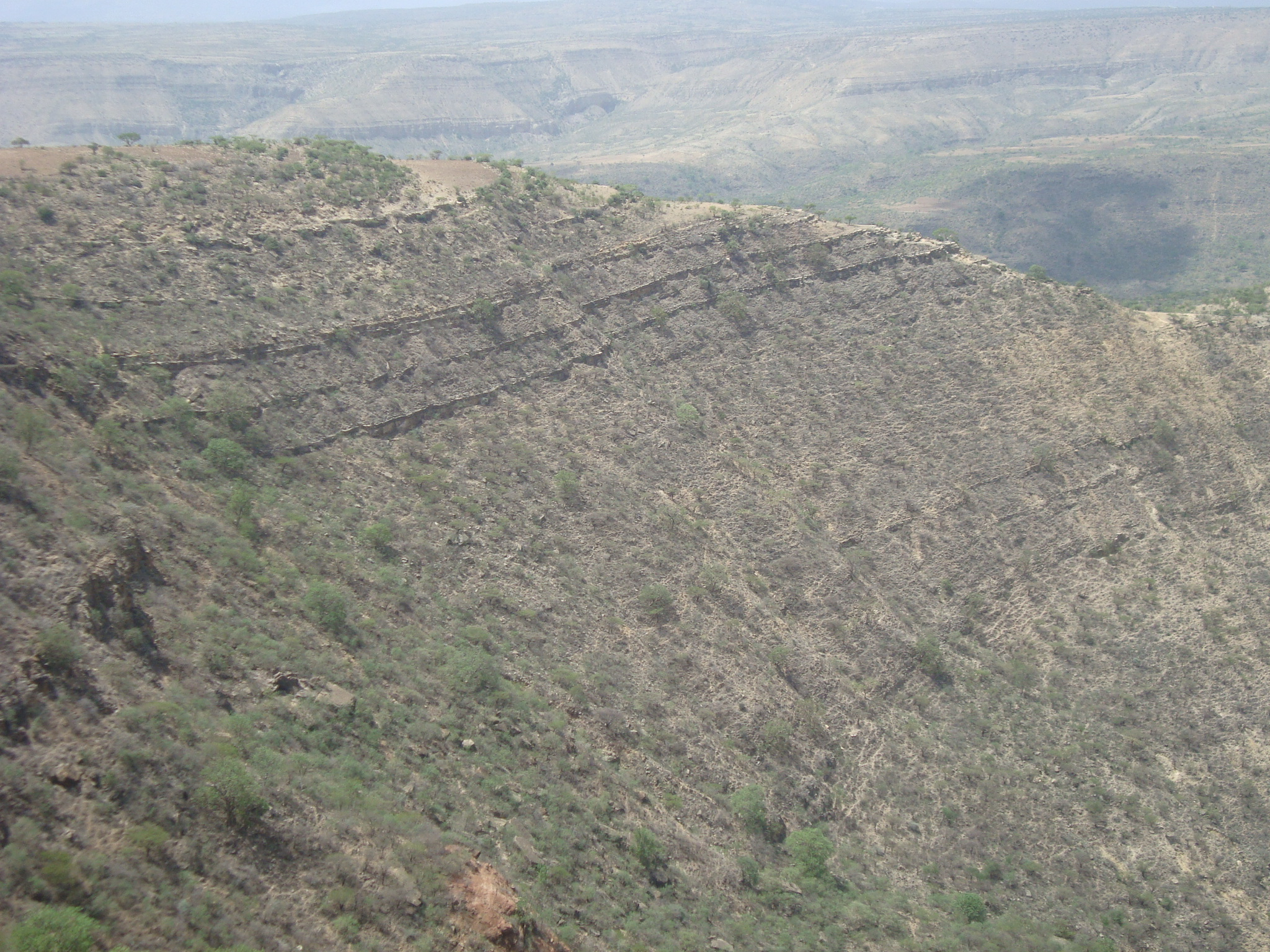
Slopes of the Giba gorge at Addi Lihtsi, with incense trees

This land system occurs on in the deeply incised gorge of Giba River, at the lower side of tabias Walta, Inda Sillasie, Amanit and Debre Nazret.

- Dominant soil type: complex of rock outcrops, very stony and very shallow soils ((Lithic) Leptosol) (1)
- Associated soil types
  - shallow, stony, dark, loamy soils on calcaric material (Rendzic Leptosol) (3)
  - shallow, stony to sandy loam soils on calcaric material (Calcaric Regosol and Cambisol) (21)
  - brown loamy sands developed on alluvium along Giba River (Fluvisol)

=== Gently rolling Antalo Limestone plateau, holding cliffs and valley bottoms ===
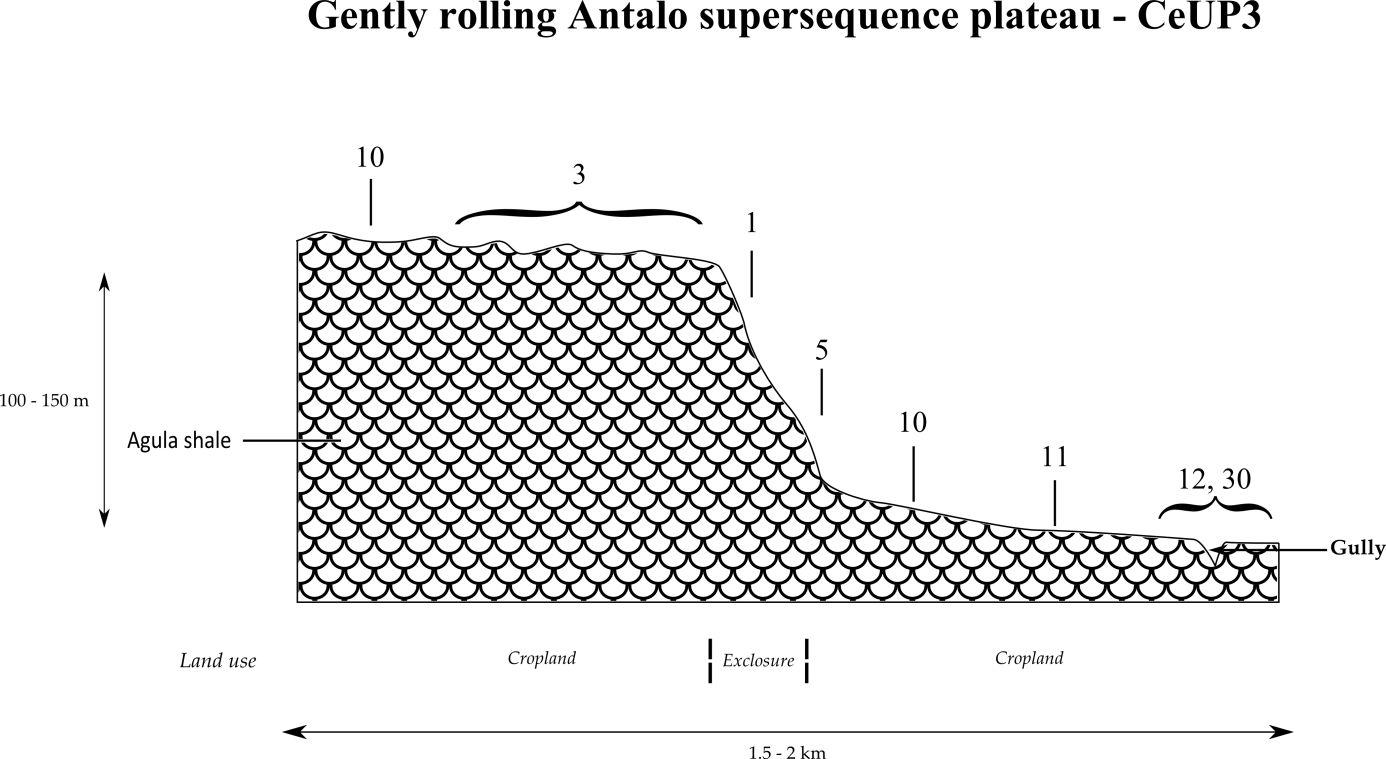
Typical catena in the gently rolling Antalo limestone plateau

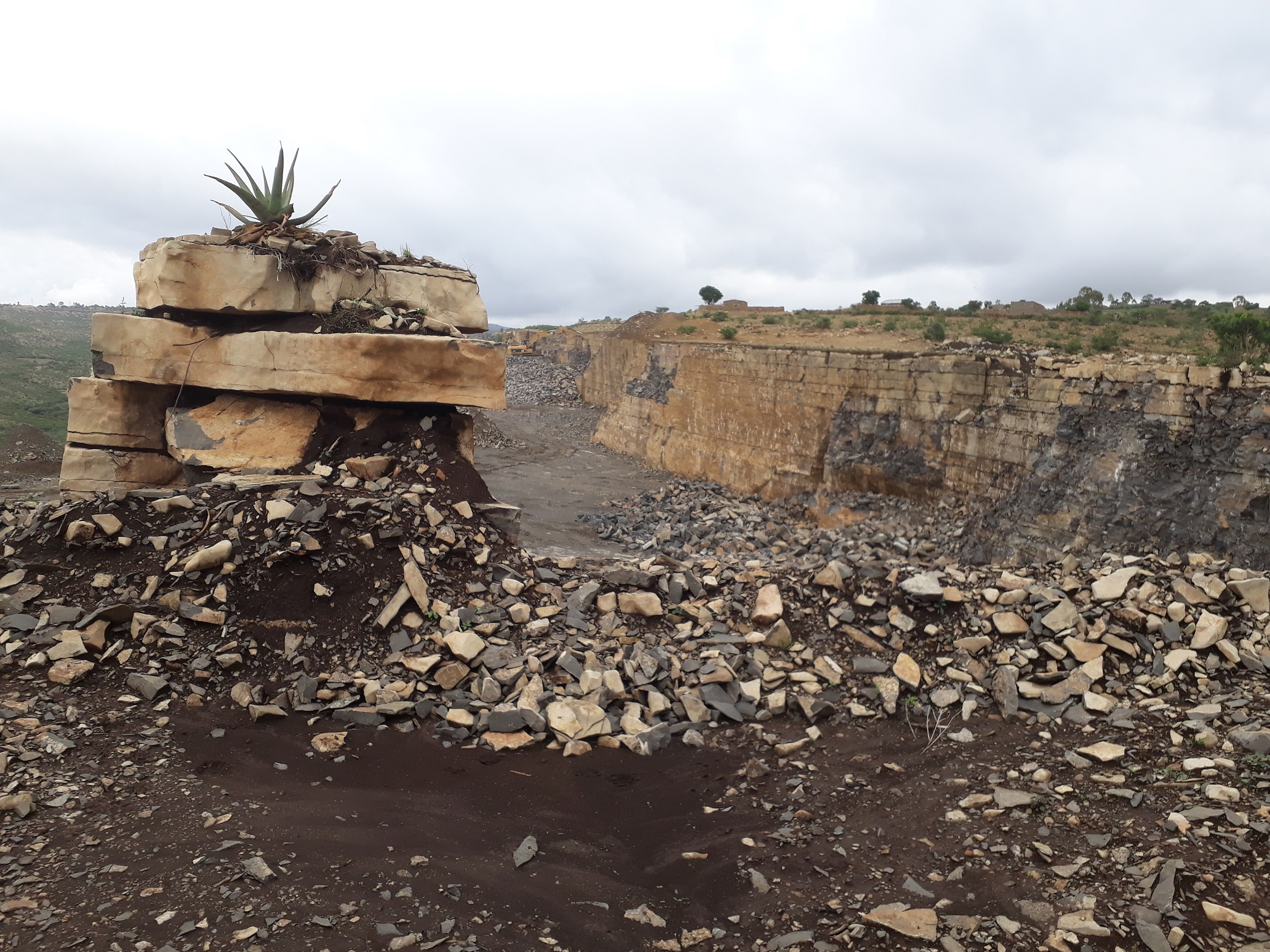
Quarrying of Antalo Limestone covered with Vertic Cambisol in Addi Ateroman

This land system occurs on Antalo Limestone, it is predominant in tabias Walta, Inda Sillasie, Ayninbirkekin, Amanit and Debre Nazret.

- Associated soil types
  - shallow stony soils with a dark surface horizon overlying calcaric material (Calcaric Leptosol) (3)
  - moderately deep dark stony clays with good natural fertility (Vertic Cambisol) (10)
  - deep, dark cracking clays on calcaric material (Calcaric Vertisol, Calcic Vertisol) (11)
- Inclusions
  - Rock outcrops and very shallow soils (Lithic Leptosol) (1)
  - Shallow very stony loamy soil on limestone (Skeletic Calcaric Cambisol) (5)
  - Deep dark cracking clays with very good natural fertility, waterlogged during the wet season (Chromic Vertisol, Pellic Vertisol) (12)
  - Brown to dark sands and silt loams on alluvium (Vertic Fluvisol, Eutric Fluvisol, Haplic Fluvisol) (30)

=== Gently undulating Agula shale plateau with dolerite ===
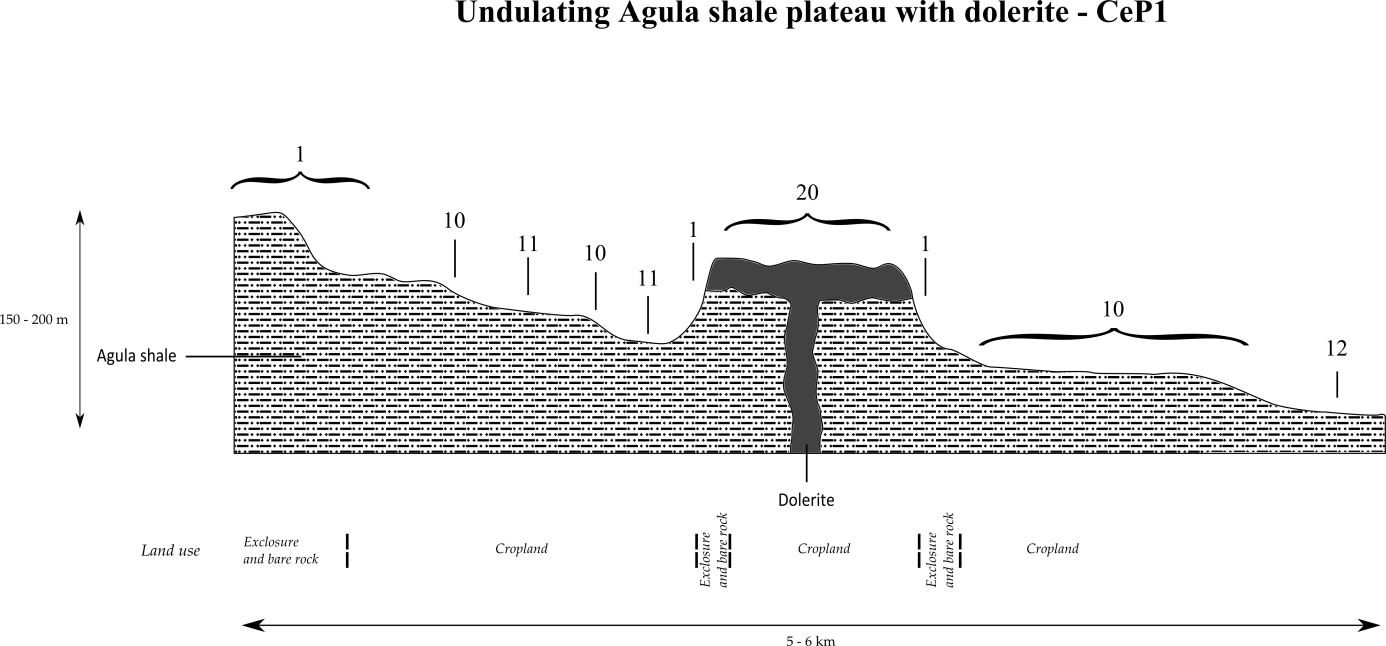
Typical catena on the undulating Agula shale plateau with dolerite

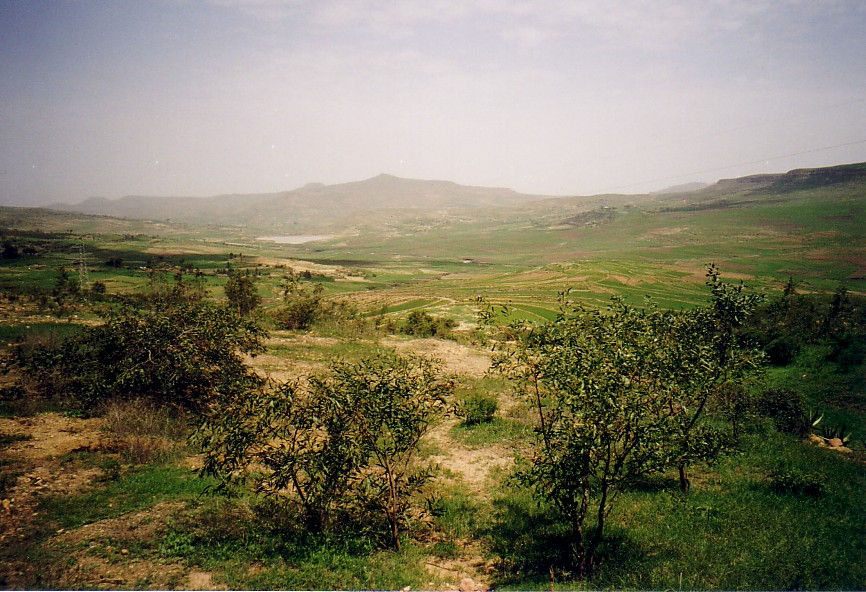
Landscape on Agula Shale in Haddinnet

This land system occurs on Agula Shale at the east of Dogu'a Tembien, it is predominant in tabias Addi Azmera, Mizane Birhan and parts of Debre Nazret, Haddinnet and Addilal.

- Dominant soil type: stony, dark cracking clays with good natural fertility (Vertic Cambisol) (10)
- Associated soil types
  - rock outcrops, stony and shallow soils (Lithic Leptosol) (1)
  - red-brownish loamy soils with good natural fertility (Chromic Luvisol) (20)
- Inclusions
  - deep, dark cracking clays on calcaric material with good fertility but poor drainage (Vertisol) (11,12)

=== Incised Giba plateau, upstream of (future) Lake Giba ===
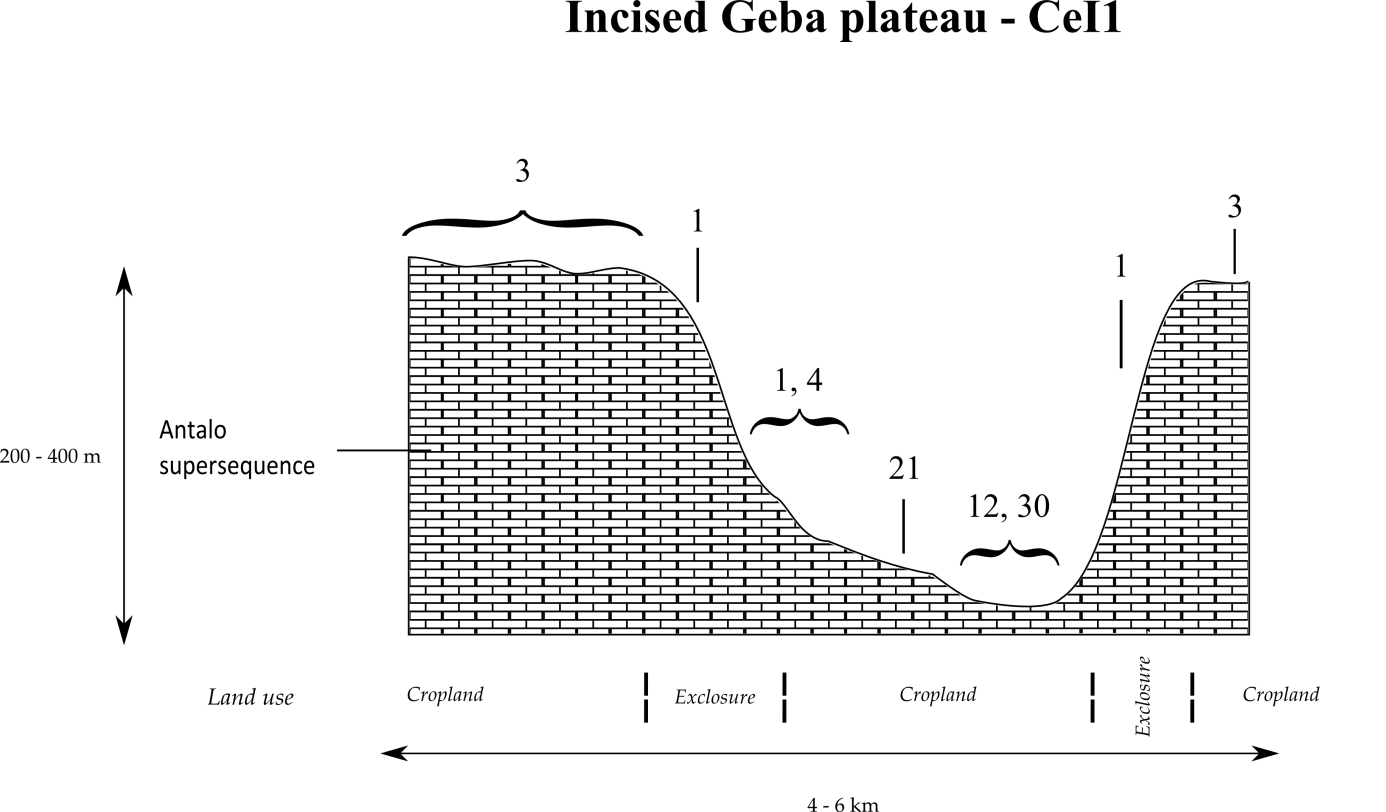
Typical catena on the incised Giba plateau

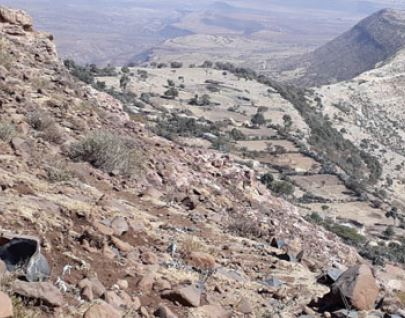
View on the incised Giba plateau, down from Ts'arot

This land system occurs on Antalo Limestone; it is predominant in tabias Emni Ankelalu and Addilal.

- Associated soil types
  - complex of rock outcrops, very stony and very shallow soils ((Lithic) Leptosol) (1)
  - shallow, stony, dark, loamy soils on calcaric material (Rendzic Leptosol) (3)
  - shallow to very shallow, very stony, loamy soils (Skeletic/Leptic Cambisol and Regosol) (4)
- Inclusions
  - Shallow, stony loam soils with moderate fertility (Eutric Regosol and Cambisol) (21)
  - Deep, dark cracking clays with good fertility, but problems of waterlogging (Chromic and Pellic Vertisol) (12)
  - Brown to dark, silty clay loams to loamy sands developed on alluvium, with good natural fertility (Fluvisol) (30)

=== Giba wide valley bottom ===
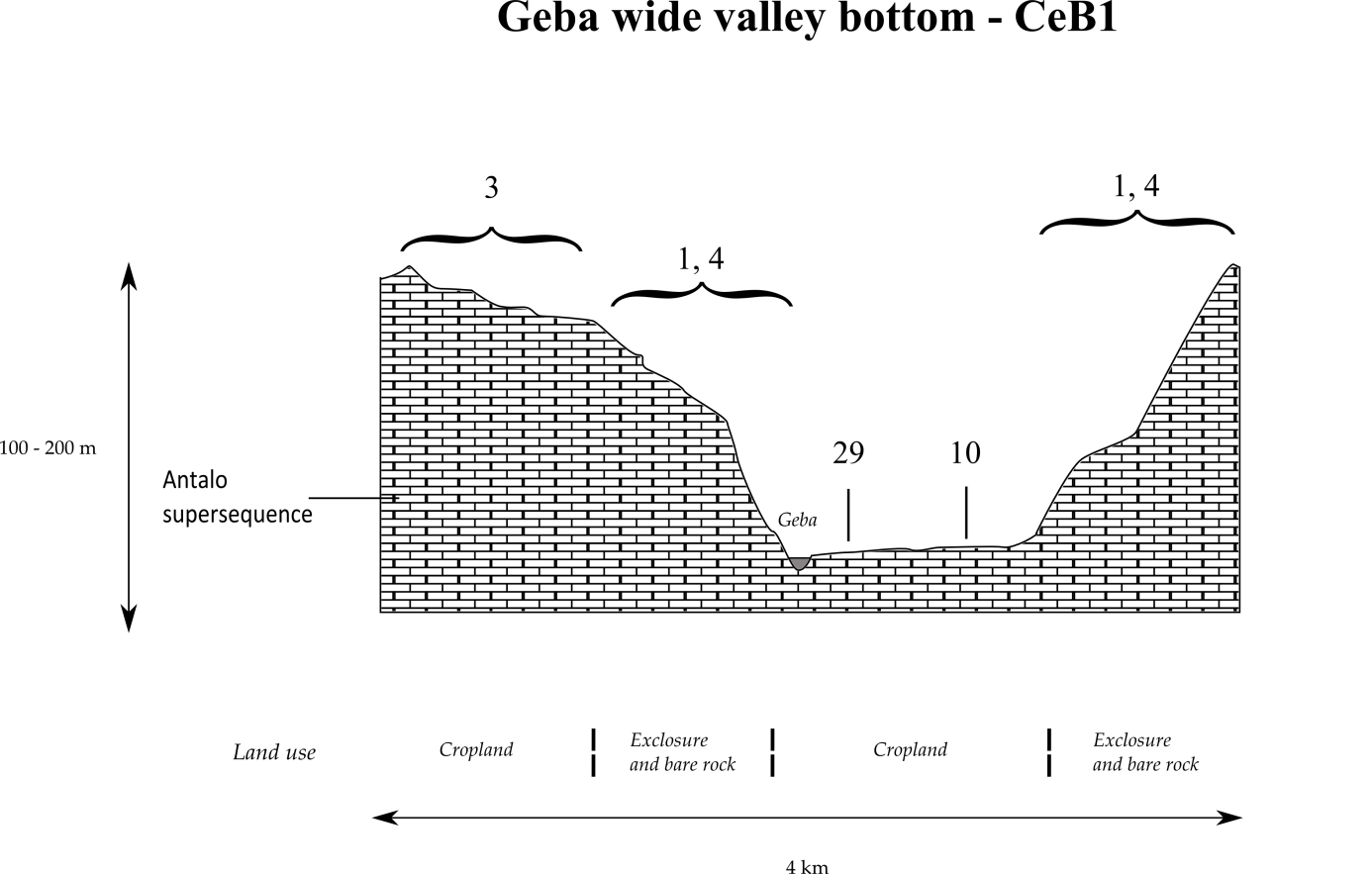
Typical catena in the Giba wide valley bottom

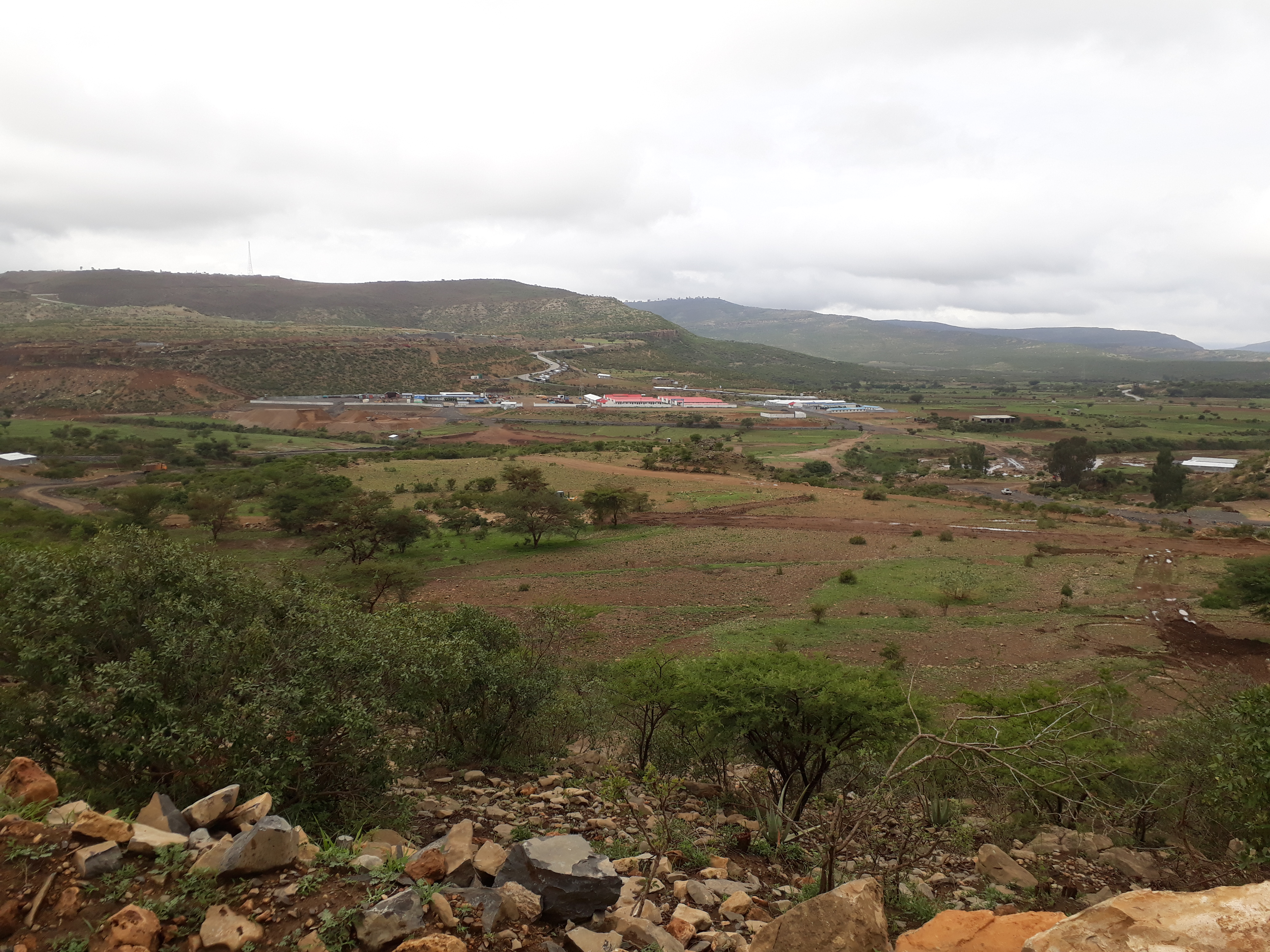
The Giba wide valley bottom

This land system occurs where the Giba valley widens; it occurs only at the lower places of tabia Emni Ankelalu and will be flooded once the Lake Giba reservoir will be filled.

- Associated soil types
  - complex of rock outcrops, very stony and very shallow soils ((Lithic) Leptosol) (1)
  - shallow, stony, dark, loamy soils on calcaric material (Rendzic Leptosol) (3)
  - shallow, very stony, silt loamy to loamy soils (Skeletic Cambisol, Leptic Cambisol, Skeletic Regosol) (4)
- Inclusions
  - moderately deep dark stony clays with good natural fertility (Vertic Cambisol) (10)
  - Brown, silty loams to loamy sands developed on alluvium, with good natural fertility (Mollic) Fluvisol, Fluvic Cambisol (29)

== Soil erosion and conservation ==
The reduced soil protection by vegetation cover, combined with steep slopes and erosive rainfall has led to excessive soil erosion. Nutrients and organic matter were lost and soil depth was reduced. Hence, soil erosion is an important problem, which results in low crop yields and biomass production. As a response to the strong degradation and thanks to the hard labour of many people in the villages, soil conservation has been carried out on a large scale since the 1980s and especially 1980s; this has curbed rates of soil loss.

Measures include the construction of infiltration trenches, stone bunds, check dams, small reservoirs such as Chini and May Leiba as well as a major biological measure: exclosures in order to allow forest regeneration. On the other hand, it remains difficult to convince farmers to carry out measures within the farmland (in situ soil management), such as bed and furrows or zero grazing, as there is a fear for loss of income from the land. Such techniques are however very effective.
