= Zeyi River =

River in the Tembien highlands of Ethiopia

Zeyi
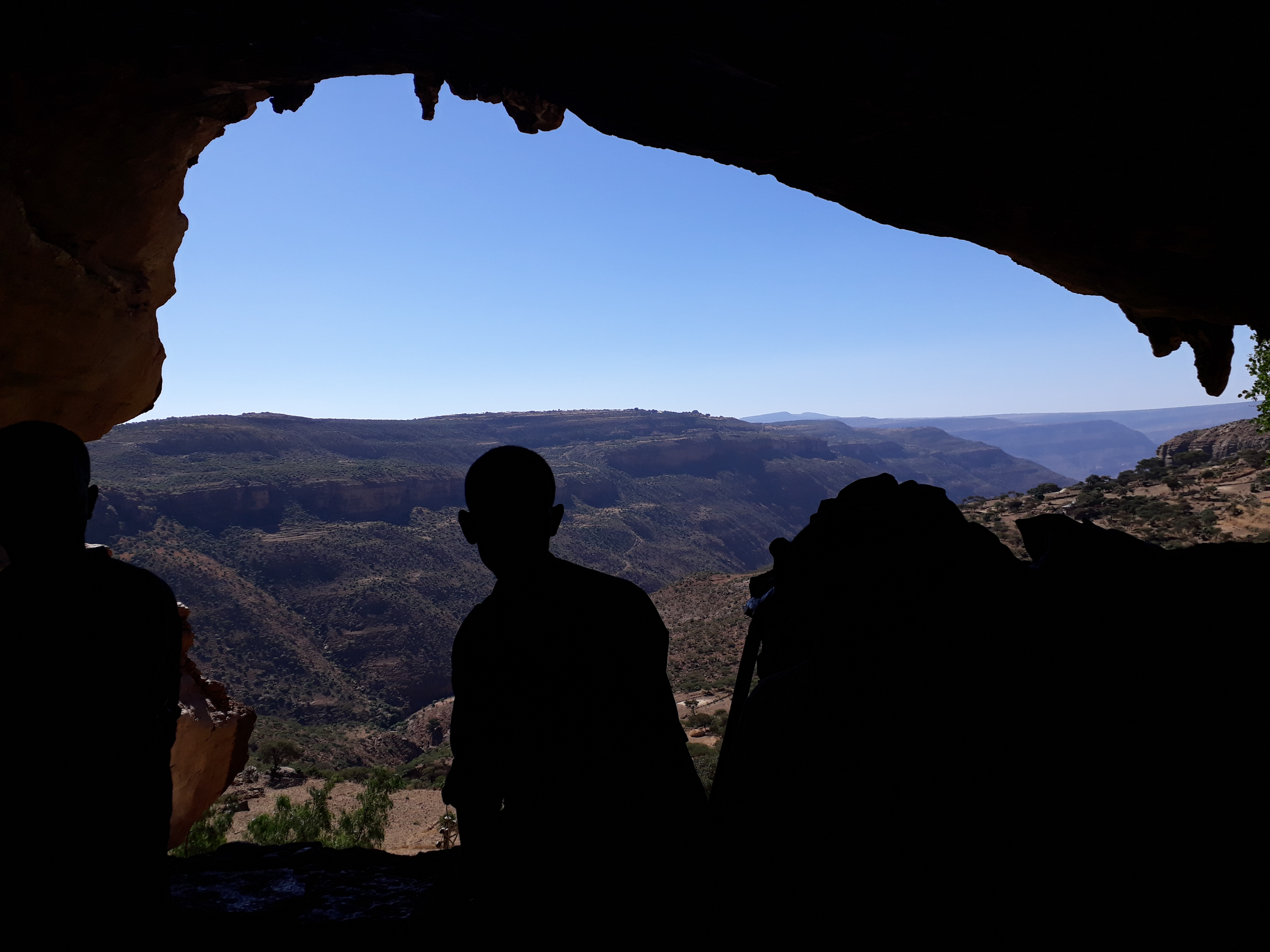
- The Zeyi gorge as seen from the Zeyi cave entrance

- Zeyi River in Dogu’a Tembien

Location
- Country: Ethiopia
- Region: Tigray Region
- District (woreda): Dogu’a Tembien

Physical characteristics
- Source: May Shafa
  - location: Addi Ferti in Walta municipality
  - coordinates: 13°34′52″N 39°08′43″E
  - elevation: 2,395 m (7,858 ft)
- Mouth: Giba River
  - location: Kemishana in Walta municipality
  - coordinates: 13°28′52″N 39°07′42″E
  - elevation: 1,405 m (4,610 ft)
- Length: 14.5 km (9.0 mi)
- Width
  - average: 15 m (49 ft)

Basin features
- Progression: Giba→ Tekezé→ Atbarah→ Nile→ Mediterranean Sea
- River system: Seasonal river
- Landmarks: Zeyi cave and monastery
- Topography: mountains and deep gorges

The Zeyi is a river of the Nile basin. Rising in the mountains of Dogu'a Tembien in northern Ethiopia, it flows southward to empty into the Giba River.

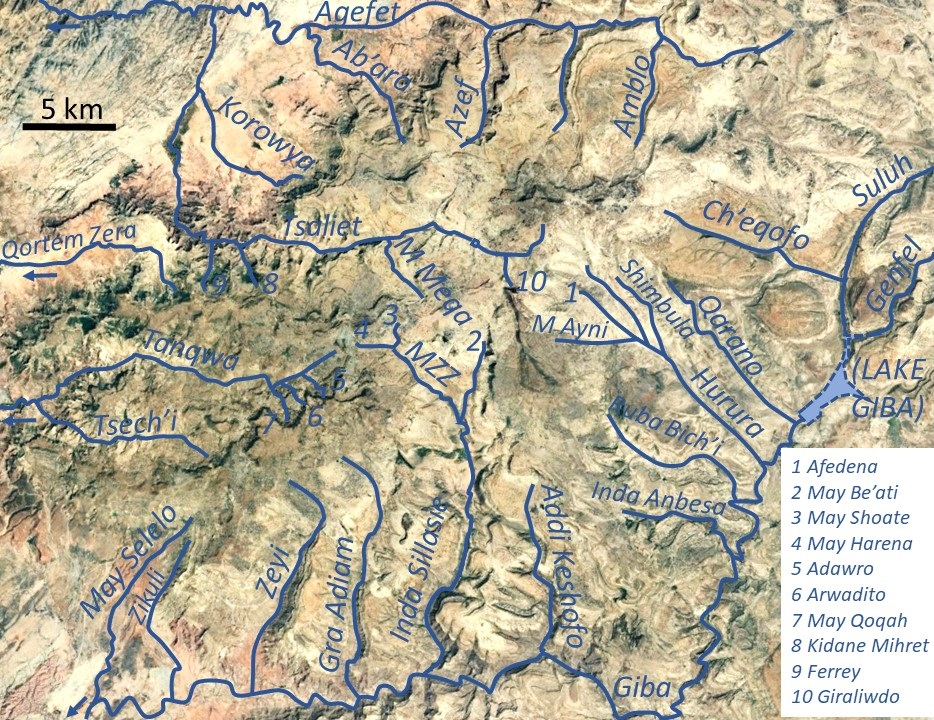
The river in the radial drainage network of Dogu’a Tembien

== Characteristics ==
The Zeyi is a confined ephemeral river, a bedrock river, with an average slope gradient of 68 metres per kilometre. With its tributaries, the river has cut a deep gorge.

== Flash floods and flood buffering ==
Runoff mostly occurs in the form of high runoff discharge events that occur in a very short period (called flash floods). These are related to the steep topography, often little vegetation cover and intense convective rainfall. The peaks of such flash floods have often a 50 to 100 times larger discharge than the preceding baseflow. The magnitude of floods in this river has however been decreased due to interventions in the catchment.

At Ziban Dake and on other steep slopes, exclosures have been established; the dense vegetation largely contributes to enhanced infiltration, less flooding and better baseflow. Physical conservation structures such as stone bunds and check dams intercept runoff.

== Transhumance towards the gorge ==
Transhumance takes place in the summer rainy season, when the lands near the villages are occupied by crops. Young shepherds will take the village cattle down to the gorge and overnight in small caves. The gorges are particularly attractive as a transhumance destination zone, because there is water and good growth of semi-natural vegetation.

== Boulders and pebbles in the river bed ==
Boulders and pebbles encountered in the river bed can originate from any location higher up in the basin. In the uppermost stretches of the river, only rock fragments of the upper lithological units will be present in the river bed, whereas more downstream one may find a more comprehensive mix of all lithologies crossed by the river. From upstream to downstream, the following lithological units occur in the catchment.

- Upper basalt
- Interbedded lacustrine deposits
- Lower basalt
- Amba Aradam Formation
- Antalo Limestone
- Quaternary freshwater tufa
- Adigrat Sandstone

== Natural boundary ==
During its course, this river passes through three municipalities and constitutes their borders. On the various parts:

- Walta to the east
- Seret to the northwest
- Simret to the west and southwest

== Trekking along the river ==
Trekking routes have been established across and along this river. The tracks are not marked on the ground but can be followed using downloaded .GPX files.

- Trek 8, with two variants, through and along Zeyi gorge

In the rainy season, flash floods may occur and it is advised not to follow the river bed. At times it may be impossible to cross the river in the rainy season.

== See also ==
- List of Ethiopian rivers
