= Walta (Dogu'a Tembien) =

Municipality in Degua Tembien, Tigray Region, Ethiopia

- Municipality
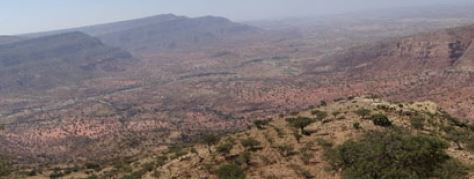
- The southern side of Walta stretches down towards Giba River

- Location within Ethiopia
- Coordinates: 13°35′N 39°11′E
- Country: Ethiopia
- Region: Tigray
- Zone: Debub Misraqawi (Southeastern)
- Woreda: Dogu'a Tembien

Area
  - Total: 54.85 km^{2} (21.18 sq mi)
- Elevation: 2,340 m (7,680 ft)
- Time zone: UTC+3 (EAT)

Walta is a municipality in the Dogu'a Tembien district of the Tigray Region of Ethiopia. The tabia centre is in Da'erere village, located approximately 7 km to the south of the woreda town Hagere Selam.

== Geography ==
The tabia stretches down from the foot of the Tsatsen ridge escarpment towards Giba River. It is further bound by three gorges: Gra Adiam/Bitchoqo in the east, Giba River in the south, and Zeyi River in the west. The highest peak is near the top of Tsatsen plateau (2760 m a.s.l.) and the lowest place at the confluence of Giba and Zeyi Rivers (1400 m a.s.l.), which have a difference in elevation of nearly 1400 metres.

=== Geology ===
From the higher to the lower locations, the following geological formations are present:

- Upper basalt
- Interbedded lacustrine deposits
- Lower basalt
- Amba Aradam Formation
- Antalo Limestone
- Adigrat Sandstone
- Quaternary alluvium and freshwater tufa

=== Geomorphology and soils ===
The main geomorphic units, with corresponding soil types are:

- Gently rolling Antalo Limestone plateau, holding cliffs and valley bottoms on limestone
  - Associated soil types
    - shallow stony soils with a dark surface horizon overlying calcaric material (Calcaric Leptosol)
    - moderately deep dark stony clays with good natural fertility (Vertic Cambisol)
    - deep, dark cracking clays on calcaric material (Calcaric Vertisol, Calcic Vertisol)
  - Inclusions
    - Rock outcrops and very shallow soils (Lithic Leptosol)
    - Shallow very stony loamy soil on limestone (Skeletic Calcaric Cambisol)
    - Deep dark cracking clays with very good natural fertility, waterlogged during the wet season (Chromic Vertisol, Pellic Vertisol)
    - Brown to dark sands and silt loams on alluvium (Vertic Fluvisol, Eutric Fluvisol, Haplic Fluvisol)
- Adigrat Sandstone cliff and footslope
  - Associated soil types
    - complex of rock outcrops, very stony and very shallow soils ((Lithic) Leptosol)
    - shallow, stony sandy [[loam soils (Eutric Regosol and Cambisol)
  - Inclusions
    - shallow, dry soils with very high amounts of stones (Leptic and Skeletic Cambisol and Regosol)
    - deep, dark cracking clays with good fertility, but problems of waterlogging (Chromic and Pellic Vertisol)
    - soils with stagnating water due to an abrupt textural change such as sand over clay (Haplic Planosol]])

=== Climate and hydrology ===
==== Climate and meteorology ====
The rainfall pattern shows a very high seasonality with 70 to 80% of the annual rain falling in July and August. Mean temperature in Da'erere is 19.3 °C, oscillating between average daily minimum of 10.8 °C and maximum of 27.4 °C. The contrasts between day and night air temperatures are much larger than seasonal contrasts.

==== Rivers ====
The Giba River is the most important river in the surroundings of the tabia. It flows towards Tekezze River and further on to the Nile. These rivers have incised deep gorges which characterise the landscape. The drainage network of the tabia is organised as follows:

- Giba River, receiving on its right bank
  - Gra Adiam River, which becomes Bitchoqo River, at the border of tabias Walta and Inda Sillasie
  - Zeyi River, at the border of tabias Simret and Walta

Whereas they are (nearly) dry during most of the year, during the main rainy season, these rivers carry high runoff discharges, sometimes in the form of flash floods. Especially at the begin of the rainy season they are brown-coloured, evidencing high soil erosion rates.

==== Springs ====
As there are no permanent rivers, the presence of springs is of utmost importance for the local people. The main springs in the tabia are:

- Kalena in Addi Ferti
- May Shafa in Addi Ferti
- May Ayni in Da'erere
- May Tselot near Giba River

==== Water harvesting ====
In this area with rains that last only for a couple of months per year, reservoirs of different sizes allow harvesting runoff from the rainy season for further use in the dry season.

- Traditional surface water harvesting ponds, particularly in places without permanent springs, called rahaya
- Horoyo, household ponds, recently constructed through campaigns

=== Vegetation and exclosures ===
The tabia holds several exclosures, areas that are set aside for regreening. Wood harvesting and livestock range are not allowed there. Besides effects on biodiversity, water infiltration, protection from flooding, sediment deposition, carbon sequestration, people commonly have economic benefits from these exclosures through grass harvesting, beekeeping and other non-timber forest products. The local inhabitants also consider it as "land set aside for future generations". In this tabia, some exclosures are managed by the EthioTrees project. They have as an additional benefit that the villagers receive carbon credits for the sequestered CO_{2}, as part of a carbon offset programme. The revenues are then reinvested in the villages, according to the priorities of the communities; it may be for an additional class in the village school, a water pond, conservation in the exclosures, or a store for incense. The Ziban Dake exclosure is managed by the Ethiotrees project in Walta municipality.

=== Settlements ===
The tabia centre Da'erere holds a few administrative offices, a health post, a primary school, and some small shops. There are a few more primary schools across the tabia. The main other populated places are:

- Nowate
- Addi Ferti
- Inda Iyesus
- Addi Gethamano

- Guri
- Didiben
- Nibre

== Agriculture and livelihood ==
The population lives essentially from crop farming, supplemented with off-season work in nearby towns. The land is dominated by farmlands which are clearly demarcated and are cropped every year. Hence the agricultural system is a permanent upland farming system. The farmers have adapted their cropping systems to the spatio-temporal variability in rainfall. Especially the youngsters in Didiben and Nibre go to the deep gorge of Giba river to harvest incense from Boswellia papyrifera trees.

== History and culture ==
=== History ===
The history of the tabia is strongly confounded with the history of Tembien.

=== Religion and churches ===
Most inhabitants are Orthodox Christians. The following churches are located in the tabia:

- Nibre Abune Ayezgi
- Didiben Iyesus
- Mehanie Alem
- Addi Ferti Maryam

=== Inda Siwa, the local beer houses ===
In the main villages, there are traditional beer houses (Inda Siwa), often in unique settings, where people socialise. Well known in the tabia are

- Amlesu Gebremariam at Da'erere
- Tinsu'i Belay at Da'erere

== Roads and communication ==
The main road Mekelle – Hagere Selam – Abiy Addi runs 5 to 15 km north and west of the tabia. People need to walk first to Inda Maryam Qorar or Hagere Selam before travelling further. For transportation of goods, a rural access road links Walta to the main asphalt road in Dongolo.

== Tourism ==
Its mountainous nature and relative proximity to Mekelle make the tabia fit for tourism. As compared to many other mountain areas in Ethiopia the villages are quite accessible, and during walks visitors may be invited for coffee, lunch or even for an overnight stay in a rural homestead.

=== Touristic attractions ===
- Views over the gorges, including view of Zeyi Abune Aregawi church under a cliff
- Anthropogenic Boswellia papyrifera landscapes and incense harvesting

=== Geotouristic sites ===
The high variability of geological formations and the rugged topography invite for geological and geographic tourism or "geotourism".

=== Trekking routes ===
Trekking routes have been established in this tabia. The tracks are not marked on the ground but can be followed using downloaded. GPX files.

- Trek 9, from Hagere Selam to Inda Sillasie allows visiting the northern part of the tabia
- Trek 8, southbound from Zeyi church and cave, crosses the southern part of the tabia to Giba River and allows visiting the slopes of the Giba gorge, with numerous incense trees

== See also ==
- Dogu'a Tembien district.
