= Simret =

Municipality in Tigray Region, Ethiopia

- Municipality
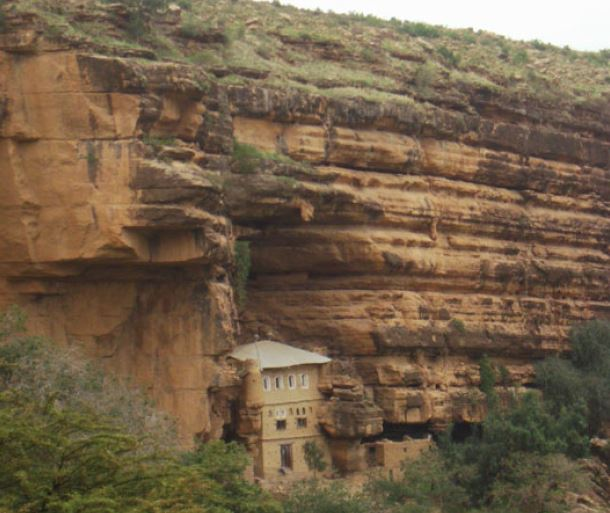
- Abuna Aregewi church in Zeyi, holding the entrance of the Zeyi cave

- Location within Ethiopia
- Coordinates: 13°34′N 39°7′E
- Country: Ethiopia
- Region: Tigray
- Zone: Debub Misraqawi (Southeastern)
- Woreda: Dogu'a Tembien

Area
  - Total: 55.16 km^{2} (21.30 sq mi)
- Elevation: 2,500 m (8,200 ft)

Population (2007)
  - Total: 6,448
  - Density: 117/km^{2} (300/sq mi)
- Time zone: UTC+3 (EAT)

Simret is a municipality in the Tanqua Millash district of the Tigray Region, Ethiopia, which comprises the longest cave of Tigray in Zeyi, as well as Ras Alula's birthplace in Mennewe. The municipality centre is in Dengolo village. Until January 2020, Simret belonged to the Dogu'a Tembien district.

== Geography ==
The tabia occupies a massive ridge at the southwest of Dogu'a Tembien, between the Zeyi gorge and the large amphitheatre-like valley of Mennewe, through which the main road winds from the lowlands to the Tembien highlands. The southern boundary is the Giba river. The highest peak is at the northern end of the tabia (2710 m a.s.l.) and the lowest place at the confluence of Zikuli and Giba rivers (1395 m a.s.l.). The difference in elevation is more than 1300 metres.

=== Geology ===
From the higher to the lower locations, the following geological formations are present:

- Upper basalt
- Interbedded lacustrine deposits
- Lower basalt
- Amba Aradam Formation
- Mekelle Dolerite
- Antalo Limestone
- Adigrat Sandstone
- Edaga Arbi Glacials
- Quaternary alluvium

The Zikuli, Geba and Zeyi gorges allow views on the full stratigrapical succession.

=== Geomorphology and soils ===
The main geomorphic units, with corresponding soil types are:

- Hagere Selam Highlands, along the central basalt and sandstone ridge
  - Associated soil types
    - shallow soils with high stone contents (Skeletic Cambisol, Leptic Cambisol, Skeletic Regosol)
    - moderately deep dark stony clays with good natural fertility (Vertic Cambisol)
    - deep, dark cracking clays, temporarily waterlogged during the wet season (Pellic Vertisol)
  - Inclusions
    - Rock outcrops and very shallow soils (Lithic Leptosol)
    - Rock outcrops and very shallow soils on limestone (Calcaric Leptosol)
    - Deep dark cracking clays with very good natural fertility, waterlogged during the wet season (Chromic Vertisol, Pellic Vertisol)
    - Shallow stony dark loams on calcaric material (Calcaric Regosol, Calcaric Cambisol)
    - Brown loamy soils on basalt with good natural fertility (Luvisol)
- Adigrat Sandstone cliff and footslope
  - Associated soil types
    - complex of rock outcrops, very stony and very shallow soils ((Lithic) Leptosol)
    - shallow, stony sandy loam soils (Eutric Regosol and Cambisol)
  - Inclusions
    - shallow, dry soils with very high amounts of stones (Leptic and Skeletic Cambisol and Regosol)
    - deep, dark cracking clays with good fertility, but problems of waterlogging (Chromic and Pellic Vertisol)
    - soils with stagnating water due to an abrupt textural change such as sand over clay (Haplic Planosol)

=== Climate and hydrology ===
==== Climate and meteorology ====
The rainfall pattern shows a very high seasonality with 70 to 80% of the annual rain falling in July and August. Mean temperature in Dengolo is 18 °C, oscillating between average daily minimum of 10 °C and maximum of 25.7 °C. In the lowland Kemishana village, at 1430 metres, the mean temperature amounts to 26.7 °C. The contrasts between day and night air temperatures are much larger than seasonal contrasts.

==== Rivers ====
The Giba River is the most important river in the surroundings of the tabia. It flows towards Tekezze River and further on to the Nile. This river and its tributaries have incised deep gorges which characterise the landscape. The drainage network of the tabia is organised as follows:

- Giba River, with two tributaries (from upstream to downstream):
  - Zeyi River, at the border of tabias Simret and Walta
  - Gereb Awehi (Mennewe) River, in tabia Simret and Abergele (woreda)

Whereas they are (nearly) dry during most of the year, during the main rainy season, these rivers carry high runoff discharges, sometimes in the form of flash floods. Especially at the begin of the rainy season they are brown-coloured, evidencing high soil erosion rates.

==== Springs ====
As there are no permanent rivers, the presence of springs is of utmost importance for the local people. The main springs in the tabia are:

- May Fatewa in Addi Gumare
- May Neteba in Dagabr
- Damtekle in Blbla
- Gunfal in Drgza
- Mennewe in Mennewe
- May Liham in Hitsa

==== Water harvesting ====
In this area with rains that last only for a couple of months per year, reservoirs of different sizes allow harvesting runoff from the rainy season for further use in the dry season. Overall they suffer from siltation. Yet, they strongly contribute to greening the landscape, either through irrigation or seepage water. Main reservoirs are:

- Traditional surface water harvesting ponds, particularly in places without permanent springs, called rahaya
- Horoyo, household ponds, recently constructed through campaigns

=== Settlements ===
The tabia centre Dengolo holds a few administrative offices, a health post, a primary school, and some small shops. There are a few more primary schools across the tabia. The main other populated places are:

- Mennewe
- Addi Gumare
- Drgza
- Elalla
- Blbla

- Zeyi
- Godba
- Addi Shinqur
- Kemishana

== Agriculture and livelihood ==
Cattle shed in Zeyi

The population lives essentially from crop farming, supplemented with off-season work in nearby towns. The land is dominated by farmlands which are clearly demarcated and are cropped every year. Hence the agricultural system is a permanent upland farming system. The farmers have adapted their cropping systems to the spatio-temporal variability in rainfall. Especially the youngsters will go to the deep gorges of Giba and Zeyi rivers, near Kemishana, to harvest incense from Boswellia papyrifera trees.

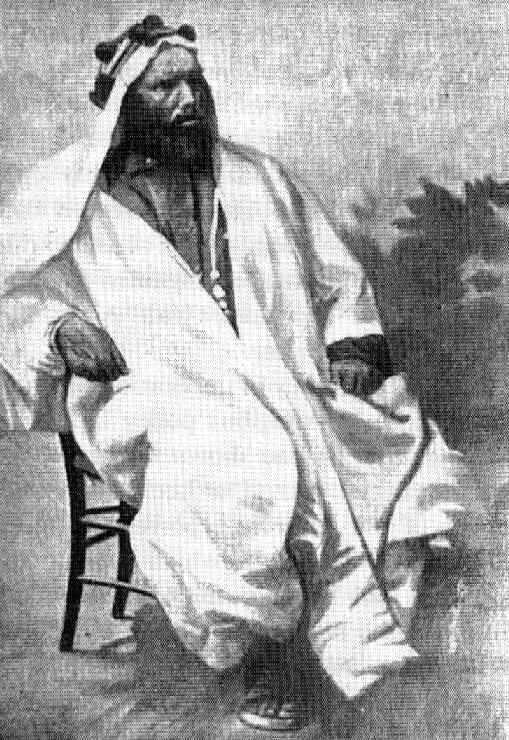
Ras Alula in 1897

== History and culture ==
=== History ===
The history of the tabia is strongly confounded with the history of Tembien. Particularly, Ras Alula was born in Mennewe, the son of Engda Eqube, a farmer of modest origins. In Alula's childhood, a group of people carrying baskets of bread to a wedding ceremony were stopped by a group of children led by the future Ras, who demanded to know where they were going. "To the Castle of Ras Alula Wedi Qubi," they mockingly replied. Thereafter, his friends and the people of Mannewe nicknamed him Ras Alula. Later, he was to become one of the most famous African generals.

=== Religion and churches ===
Most inhabitants are Orthodox Christians. The following churches are located in the tabia:

- Abune Aregawi in Zeyi, a monastery that holds the entrance to the Zeyi cave
- Abba Gabir in Dagabr
- St. Yohannes in Godba
- St. Gebriel in Dengolo
- Abba Zelibanos and St. Mariam Monastery in Mennewe
- Abba Selema in Drgza
- Sillasie in Elalla and Blbla

== Roads and communication ==
The main road from Mekelle through Hagere Selam winds down towards Abiy Addi across the Mennewe valley in the northeast of the tabia. There are regular bus services to these towns. Further, a rural access road links Addi Shinqur and Dengolo to the main asphalt road.

== Tourism ==
Its mountainous nature and proximity to Mekelle make the tabia fit for tourism. As compared to many other mountain areas in Ethiopia the villages are quite accessible, and during walks visitors may be invited for coffee, lunch or even for an overnight stay in a rural homestead.

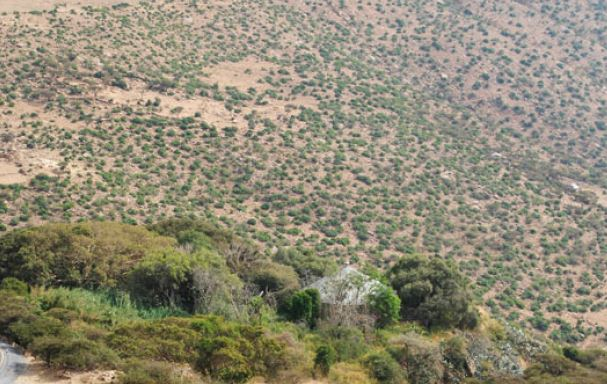
Forest of Mennewe Libanos monastery

=== Touristic attractions ===
- Mennewe monastery and birthplace of Ras Alula
- Zeyi cave in Antalo Limestone, the longest cave in Tigray and ninth longest in Ethiopia. The monumental Zeyi Abune Aregawi church holds the entrance to the cave. The 364-metres long oval gallery displays stalactites, stalagmites, decametre-high columns, bell-holes following joints, and speleothems on walls and floor.

=== Trekking routes ===
A trekking route has been established in this tabia. The tracks are not marked on the ground but can be followed using downloaded GPX files. Starting from Inda Maryam Qorar, trek 8 leads directly down to Zeyi church and cave and further across the Zeyi and Giba gorges; the trek route meets Zikuli river and follows it upstream back to the main road, down from Mennewe.

== See also ==
- Dogu'a Tembien district.
