= Ziban Dake =

Exclosure for woodland restoration in Ethiopia

Ziban Dake exclosure
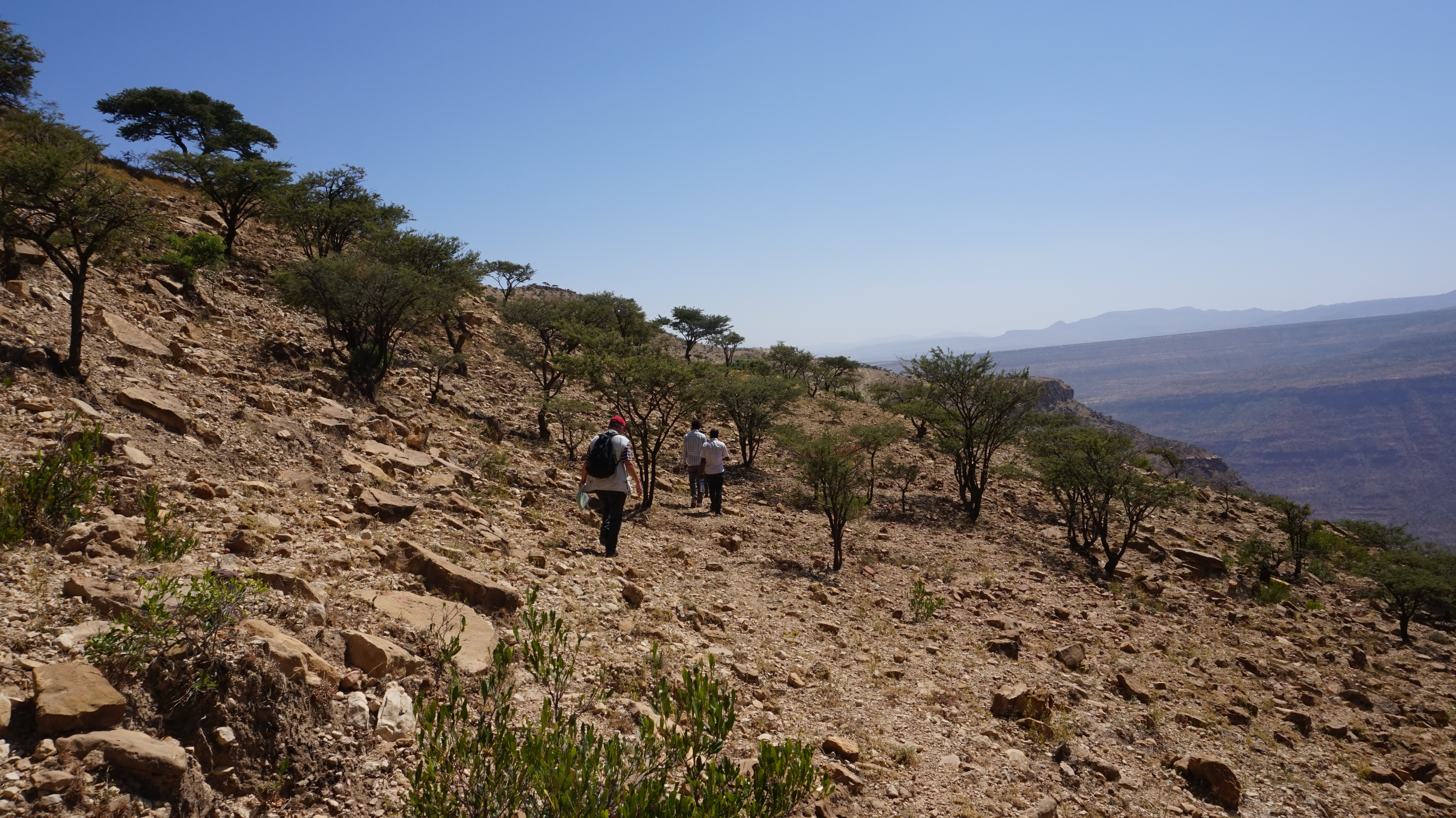
- Ziban Dake exclosure

- Location within Ethiopia
- Location: Walta (Dogu'a Tembien), Ethiopia
- Nearest city: Hagere Selam
- Coordinates: 13.5°N 39.139°E
- Area: 300 ha (740 acres)
- Website: https://ethiotrees.com

Ziban Dake is an exclosure located in the Dogu'a Tembien woreda of the Tigray Region in Ethiopia.

== Environmental characteristics ==
- Area: 300 ha
- Average slope gradient: 43%
- Aspect: The enclosure is oriented towards the south-southwest.
- Minimum altitude: 1702 metres
- Maximum altitude: 1833 metres
- Lithology: Antalo Limestone, Adigrat Sandstone
- 2019: support by the EthioTrees project

== Management ==
As a general rule, cattle ranging and wood harvesting are not allowed. The grasses are harvested once a year and taken to the homesteads of the village to feed livestock. Field observations showed that some illegal grazing occurred in the enclosure in 2018.

== Benefits for the community ==
Setting aside such areas fits with the long-term vision of the communities, where hiza’iti lands are set aside for use by future generations. It also has direct benefits for the community:

- improved ground water availability
- honey production
- incense (oil) production
- climate ameliorator (temperature, moisture)
- The sequestered carbon (in total, 34 meter per hour, predominantly sequestered in the soil and additionally in the woody vegetation) is certified using the Plan Vivo voluntary carbon standard, after which carbon credits are sold.
- The revenues are then reinvested in the villages, according to the priorities of the communities; it may be for an additional class in the village school, a water pond, conservation in the exclosures, or a store for incense.

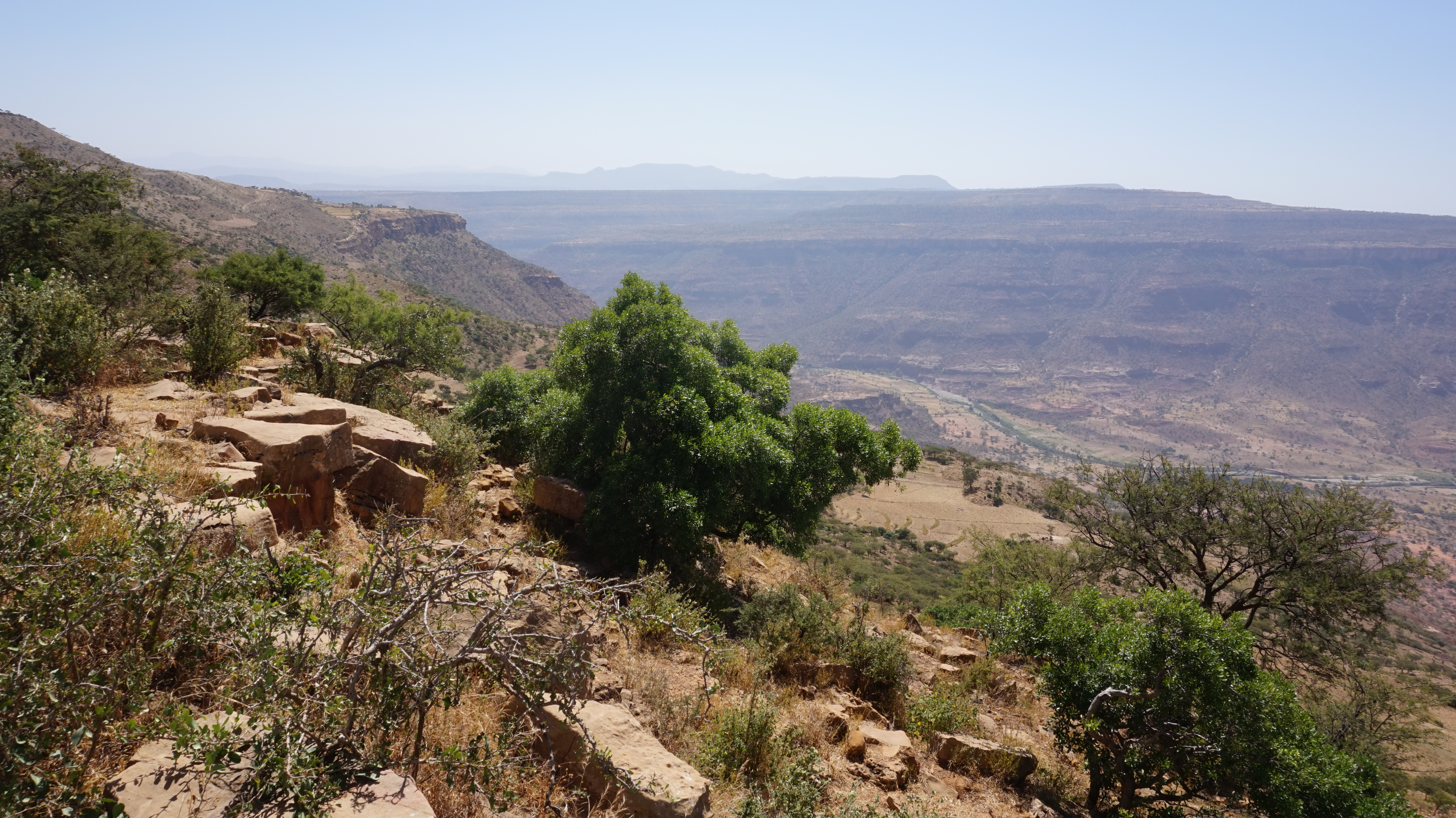
Regeneration of vegetation at Ziban Dake

== Biodiversity ==
With vegetation growth, biodiversity in this enclosure has strongly improved; there is more varied vegetation and wildlife.
