= Seret (Dogu'a Tembien) =

Municipality in Ethiopia

Seret Inda Maryam Qorar
- Location within Ethiopia
- Coordinates: 13°35′N 39°8′E
- Country: Ethiopia
- Region: Tigray
- Zone: Debub Misraqawi (Southeastern)
- Woreda: Dogu'a Tembien

Area
  - Total: 19.72 km^{2} (7.61 sq mi)
- Elevation: 2,630 m (8,630 ft)

Population (2007)
  - Total: 8,343
  - Density: 423/km^{2} (1,100/sq mi)
- Time zone: UTC+3 (EAT)

Seret is a tabia or municipality in the Dogu'a Tembien district of the Tigray Region of Ethiopia. The tabia centre is in Inda Maryam Qorar village, located approximately 11 km to the southwest of the woreda town Hagere Selam.

== Geography ==
The tabia occupies a (locally wide) structural flat on the foot of the Tsatsen plateau, along the main road. It occupies a saddle position between the Upper Tanqwa and Zeyi River gorges. The highest location is the Tsatsen plateau (culminating at 2810 m a.s.l.) and the lowest place near Zeyi cave (2180 m a.s.l.).

=== Geology ===
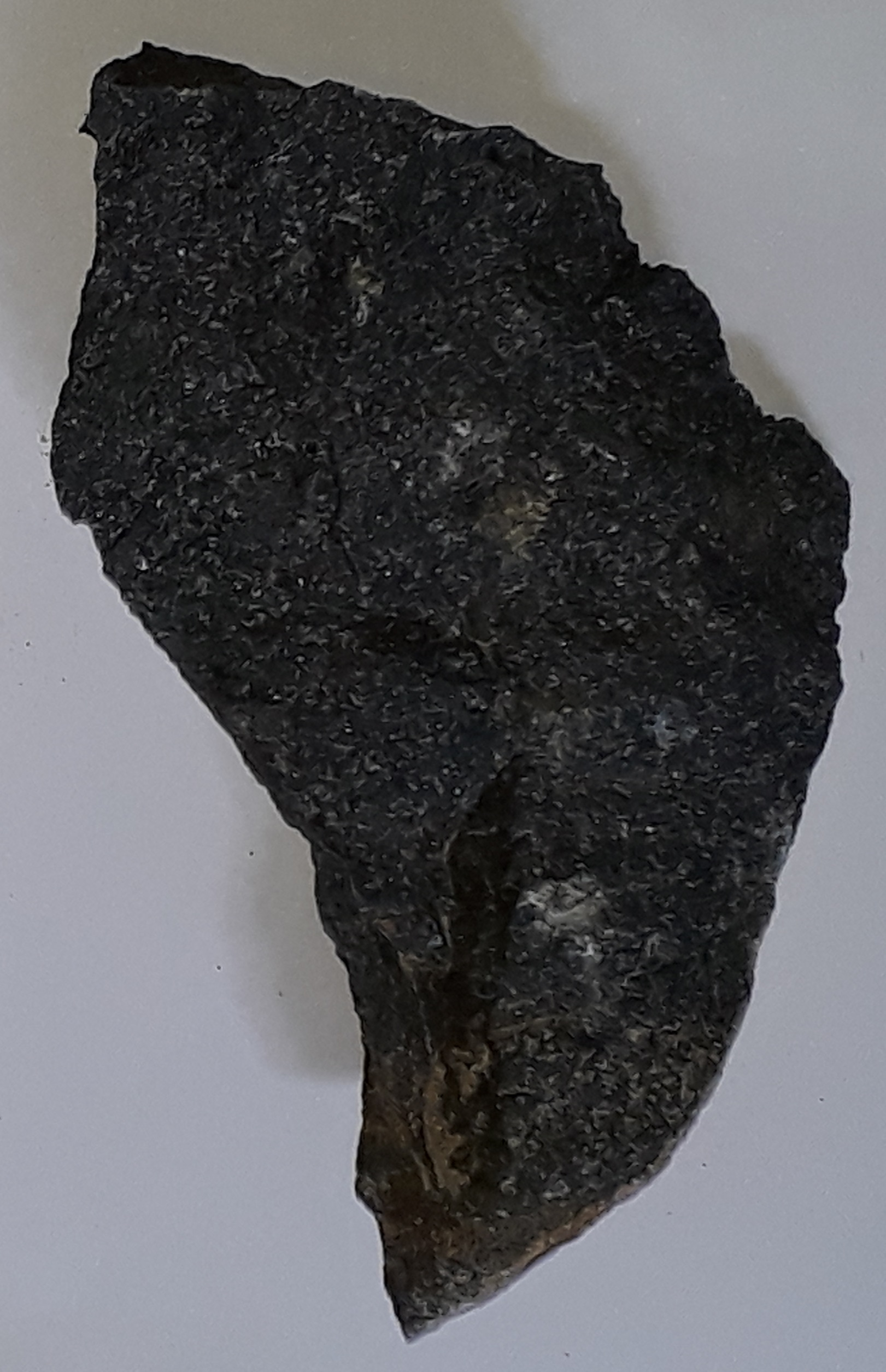
Rock sample of extremely porphyritic lower basalt, collected at May Shih

From the higher to the lower locations, the following geological formations are present:

- Upper basalt
- Interbedded lacustrine deposits
- Lower basalt
- Amba Aradam Formation
- Antalo Limestone

=== Geomorphology and soils ===
On the basalt rocks, the red-black soil catena is widespread: reddish soils such as Luvisols in the uplands and dark Vertisols in the plain around Inda Maryam. Here, the Vertisols are covered with stones, what evidences the vertic movements; they are also very prone to gully erosion. The main geomorphic unit is the Hagere Selam Highlands. Corresponding soil types are:

- Associated soil types
  - shallow soils with high stone contents (Skeletic Cambisol, Leptic Cambisol, Skeletic Regosol)
  - moderately deep dark stony clays with good natural fertility (Vertic Cambisol)
  - deep, dark cracking clays, temporarily waterlogged during the wet season (Pellic Vertisol)
- Inclusions
  - Rock outcrops and very shallow soils (Lithic Leptosol)
  - Rock outcrops and very shallow soils on limestone (Calcaric Leptosol)
  - Deep dark cracking clays with very good natural fertility, waterlogged during the wet season (Chromic Vertisol, Pellic Vertisol)
  - Shallow stony dark loams on calcaric material (Calcaric Regosol, Calcaric Cambisol)
  - Brown loamy soils on basalt with good natural fertility (Luvisol)

=== Climate and hydrology ===
==== Climate and meteorology ====
The rainfall pattern shows a very high seasonality with 70 to 80% of the annual rain falling in July and August. Mean temperature in Inda Maryam is 17 °C, oscillating between average daily minimum of 9.4 °C and maximum of 24.3 °C. The contrasts between day and night air temperatures are much larger than seasonal contrasts.

==== Rivers ====
The Giba River and its tributary the Tanqwa are the most important rivers in the surroundings of the tabia. They flow towards Tekezze River and further on to the Nile. These rivers have incised deep gorges which characterise the landscape. The drainage network of the tabia is organised as follows:

- Giba River
  - Zeyi River, at the border of tabias Simret and Walta
  - Zeleqwa River, which becomes Ruba Dirho near Seret, and Tanqwa River, in the woredas Kola Tembien and Abergele (woreda)
    - Tsech'i River, in tabias Seret, Menachek and Aregen
      - May Dechena, with its source in Inda Maryam

Whereas they are (nearly) dry during most of the year, during the main rainy season, these rivers carry high runoff discharges, sometimes in the form of flash floods. Especially at the beginning of the rainy season, they are brown-coloured, evidencing high soil erosion rates.

==== Springs ====
As there are no permanent rivers, the presence of springs is of utmost importance for the local people. The main springs in the tabia are:

- Dechena in Inda Maryam Qorar
- May Weyni in the homonymous village
- May Ch'ech'ati in a gorge draining the Tsatsen plateau

==== Water harvesting ====
In this area with rains that last only for a couple of months per year, reservoirs of different sizes allow harvesting runoff from the rainy season for further use in the dry season.

- Traditional surface water harvesting ponds, particularly in places without permanent springs, called rahaya
- Horoyo, household ponds, recently constructed through campaigns

=== Settlements ===
The tabia centre Inda Maryam Qorar holds a few administrative offices, a health post, a primary school, and some small shops. Saturday is the market day. There are a few more primary schools across the tabia. The main other populated places are:

- May Weyni
- Addi Mishahan
- Mezegat
- Duwele
- Mashih
- May Ch'iwara
- Haddush Addi (shared with Mika'el Abiy)

The latter two villages are the highest villages of this part of Tigray, on the Tsatsen plateau, at an elevation of approximately 2800 metres.

== Agriculture and livelihood ==
The population lives essentially from crop farming, supplemented with off-season work in nearby towns. The land is dominated by farmlands which are clearly demarcated and are cropped every year. Hence the agricultural system is a permanent upland farming system. The farmers have adapted their cropping systems to the spatio-temporal variability in rainfall. The introduction of apples for cultivation in backyards by smallholder farmers was especially successful in Mashih, some 5 km to the east of Inda Maryam.

== History and culture ==
=== History ===
The history of the tabia is strongly confounded with the history of Tembien.

=== Religion and churches ===
Most inhabitants are Orthodox Christians. The following churches are located in the tabia:

- Maryam Qorar
- Maryam Mashih
- Abune Selama, on a mountain peak at the boundary to Mika'el Abiy
- Addi Mishahan Mika'el

=== Inda Siwa, the local beer houses ===
In the main villages, there are traditional beer houses (Inda Siwa), often in unique settings, where people socialise. Well known in the tabia are

- Tiwres Hailesillasie at Inda Maryam Qorar
- Tsehaynesh Abate at Inda Maryam Qorar
- Kidan Gebreayezgi at Inda Maryam Qorar

== Roads and communication ==
The main road Mekelle – Hagere Selam – Abiy Addi crosses the tabia. There are regular bus services to these towns. Further, a rural access road links Mashih, Mezegat and Duwele to the main asphalt road.

== Schools ==
Almost all children of the tabia are schooled, though in some schools there is lack of classrooms, directly related to the large intake in primary schools over the last decades. Schools in the tabia include Mashih school.

== Tourism ==
Its mountainous nature and proximity to Mekelle make the tabia fit for tourism. As compared to many other mountain areas in Ethiopia the villages are quite accessible, and during walks visitors may be invited for coffee, lunch or even for an overnight stay in a rural homestead. In Inda Maryam Qorar there are very basic hotels, mainly used by pilgrims on their way to Dabba Hadera monastery.

=== Touristic attractions ===
- Tsatsen plateau with views

=== Geotouristic sites ===
The high variability of geological formations and the rugged topography invite for geological and geographic tourism or "geotourism". Geosites in the tabia include:

- Inda Maryam extensive Vertisol area
- Views to adjacent gorges
- Apple cultivation in Mashih
- Exclosures managed by "Trees for Farmers" in the northeast of the tabia

=== Trekking routes ===
Trekking routes have been established, with starting point in Inda Maryam Qorar'. The tracks are not marked on the ground but can be followed using downloaded .GPX files.

- Trek 7, to Debre Sema'it rock church, and on to Abiy Addi
- Trek 8, from Tsatsen, through Inda Maryam to Zeyi cave and on the Giba River gorge
- Trek 8V, to Dabba Hadera monastery
- Trek 19, to Debre Sema'it rock church, and on to Agbe

== See also ==
- Dogu'a Tembien district.
