= Cropping system =

Agricultural management practice

The term cropping system refers to the crops, crop sequences and management techniques used on a particular agricultural field over a period of years. It includes all spatial and temporal aspects of managing an agricultural system. Historically, cropping systems have been designed to maximise yield, but modern agriculture is increasingly concerned with promoting environmental sustainability in cropping systems.

== Crop choice ==
Crop choice is central to any cropping system. In evaluating whether a given crop will be planted, a farmer must consider its profitability, adaptability to changing conditions, resistance to disease, and requirement for specific technologies during growth or harvesting. They must also consider the prevailing environmental conditions on their farm, and how the crop will fit in with other elements of their production system.

== Crop organisation and rotation ==
Monoculture is the practice of growing a single crop in a given area, where polyculture involves growing multiple crops in an area. Monocropping (or continuous monoculture) is a system in which the same crop is grown in the same area for a number of growing seasons. Many modern farms are made up of a number of fields, which can be cultivated separately and thus can be used in a crop rotation sequence. Crop rotation has been employed for thousands of years and has been widely found to increase yield and prevent harmful changes to the soil environment that limit productivity in the long term. Although the specific mechanisms regulating that effect are not fully understood, they are thought to be related to differential effects on soil chemical, physical, and microbiological properties by different crops. By affecting the soil in different ways, crops in a rotation help to stabilise changes in the properties. Another consideration is that many agricultural pests are species-specific and so having a given species present in a field only some of the time helps to prevent populations of pests from growing.

The organisation of individual plants in a field is also variable and typically depends on the crop being grown. Many vegetables, cereals, and fruits are grown in contiguous rows, which are wide enough to allow cultivation (or mowing, in the case of fruits) without damaging crop plants. Other systems aim for maximum plant density and have no such organisation. Forages are grown in that manner since animal traffic is expected, and maximum plant density is required for their nutrition, as are cover crops, since their purpose of competing with weeds and preventing soil erosion depends largely on density.

== Residue management ==
Managing crop residues is important in most systems. Some of the nutrients contained in these dead tissues are made available to crops during decomposition, reducing the need for fertiliser inputs. Leaving residues in place also increases the soil organic matter (SOM), which has a number of benefits. Specific management practices can have a number of other impacts.

=== Tillage ===
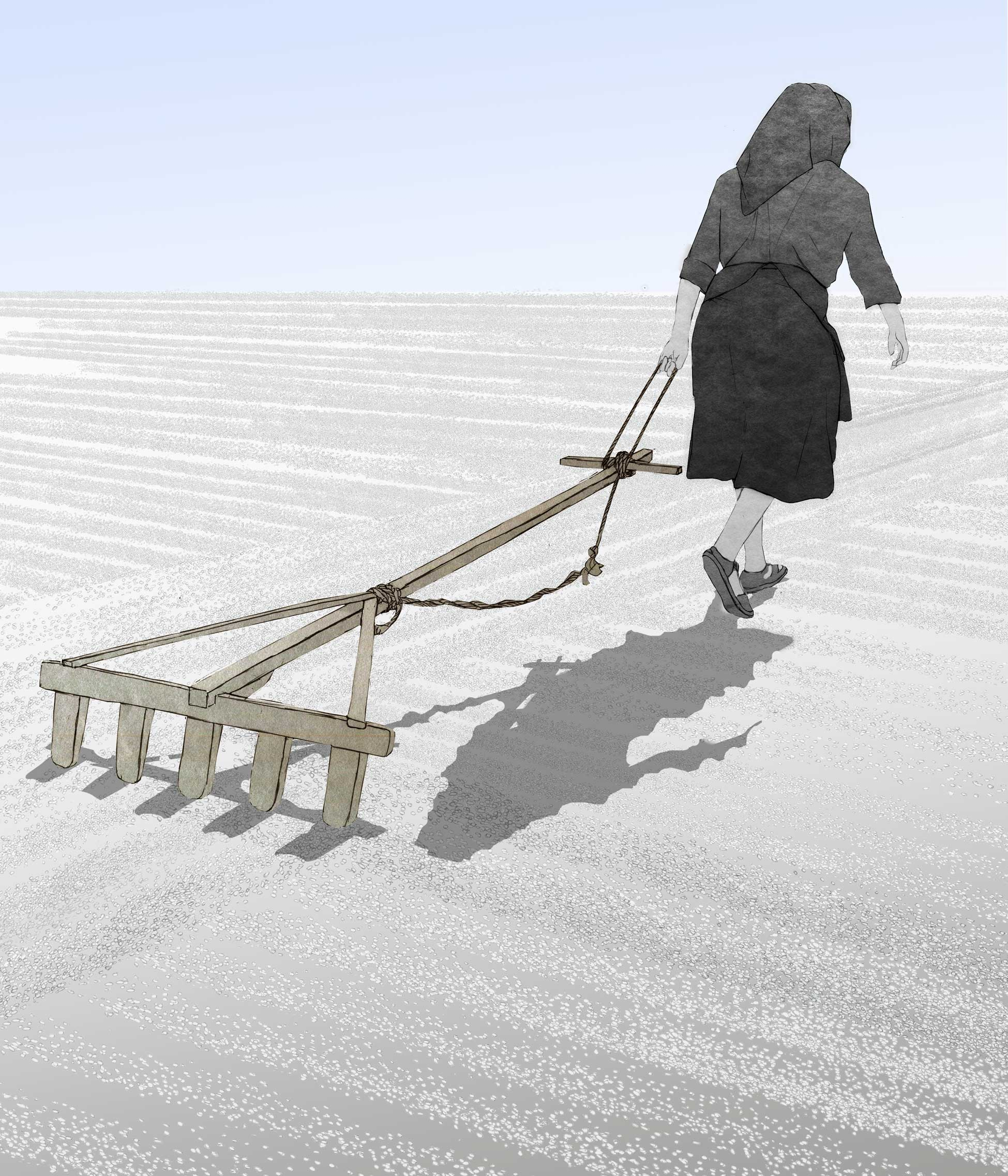
Rice tillage. Valencian Museum of Ethnology.

Tillage is the primary method by which farmers manage crop residues. Different types of tillage result in varying amounts of crop residue being incorporated into the soil profile. Conventional or intensive tillage typically leaves less than 15% of crop residues on a field, reduced tillage leaves 15–30%, and conservation tillage systems leave at least 30% on the soil surface. The differences observed across these systems are diverse, and there is still considerable debate concerning their relative economic and environmental impact, but a number of widely reported benefits have led to a major shift towards reduced tillage in modern cropping systems.

In general, leaving residues on the soil surface results in a mulching effect which helps control erosion, prevents excessive evaporation, and suppresses weeds, but may necessitate the use of specialised planting equipment. Incorporating residues into the soil profile results in rapid decomposition by soil microorganisms, which makes planting easier and in some cases could mean that nutrients will be made available to plants sooner, but limited erosion control and weed suppression are provided.

Under reduced or no-tillage, limited exposure to soil microorganisms can slow the rate of decomposition thus delaying the conversion of organic polymers to carbon dioxide and increasing the amount of carbon sequestered by the system, although in poorly aerated soils this may be offset in part by an increase in nitrous oxide emissions.

=== Burning ===
In some systems residues are burned. This is a fast and cheap way to clear a field in preparation for the next planting, and can assist with pest control, but has a number of drawbacks: organic matter (carbon) is lost from the system, soil is exposed and becomes more susceptible to erosion, and the smoke produced is an atmospheric pollutant. In many parts of the world, this practice is restricted or banned.

=== Removal ===
Especially in developing countries, crop residues may be removed and used for human or animal consumption, or other purposes. This provides a secondary source of sustenance or income, but precludes the benefits associated with leaving residues within the system.

== Nutrient management ==
Nutrients are depleted during crop growth, and must be renewed or replaced in order for agriculture to continue on a piece of land. This is generally accomplished with fertilisers, which can be organic or synthetic in origin. A large component of the organic farming movement is a preference for organic-source fertilisers.

Excessive fertilisation is not only costly, but can harm crops and have a number of environmental consequences. Therefore, there is considerable interest in developing nutrient management plans for individual plots which attempt to optimise fertiliser application rates.

== Water management ==
Soil moisture content is an important factor in plant development, and must be maintained within a range throughout the growing period. The range of tolerable moisture conditions varies from crop to crop. Irrigation and fine-textured amendments can be used to increase soil moisture, whereas coarser-textured amendments and technologies such as tile drainage can be used to decrease it.

== See also ==
- Plant density
