= Kidane Mihret River =

River in Ethiopia

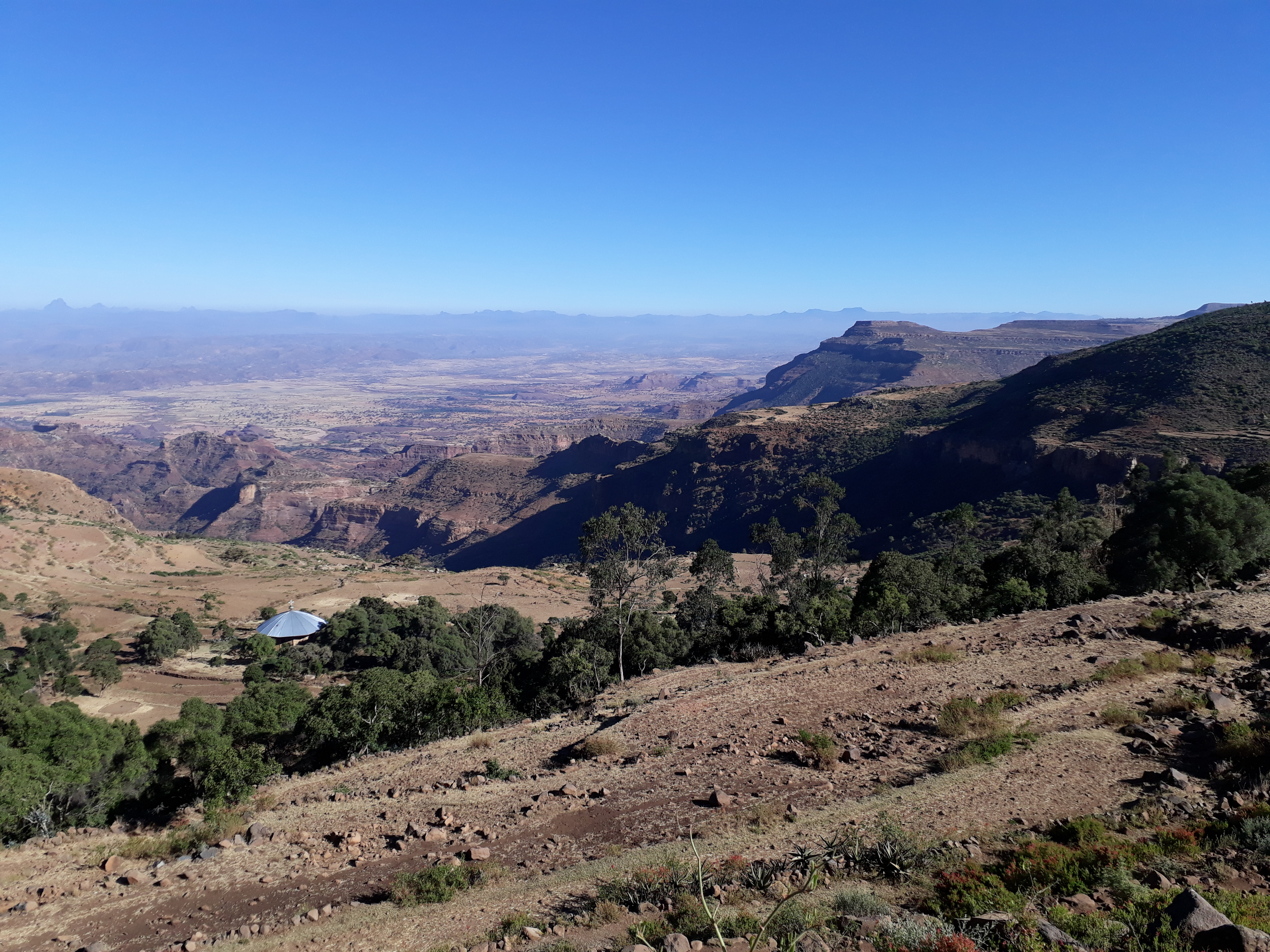
- The Kidane Mihret valley

- Kidane Mihret River in Dogu’a Tembien
- Etymology: after the homonymous church

Location
- Country: Ethiopia
- Region: Tigray Region
- District (woreda): Dogu’a Tembien

Physical characteristics
- Source: Waseiya
  - location: Mahbere Sillasie municipality
  - elevation: 2,280 m (7,480 ft)
- Mouth: Tsaliet River
  - location: near Ksad Korowya
  - coordinates: 13.699°N 39.1145°E
  - elevation: 1,820 m (5,970 ft)
- Length: 4.5 km (2.8 mi)
- Width
  - average: 10 m (33 ft)

Basin features
- Progression: Tsaliet→ Wari→ Tekezé→ Atbarah→ Nile→ Mediterranean Sea
- River system: Permanent river
- Landmarks: Awhi Dur forest
- Waterfalls: Numerous rapids
- Topography: Mountains and deep gorges

The Kidane Mihret is a river of the Nile basin. Rising in the mountains of Dogu’a Tembien in northern Ethiopia, it flows northward to empty finally in the Wari and Tekezé River.

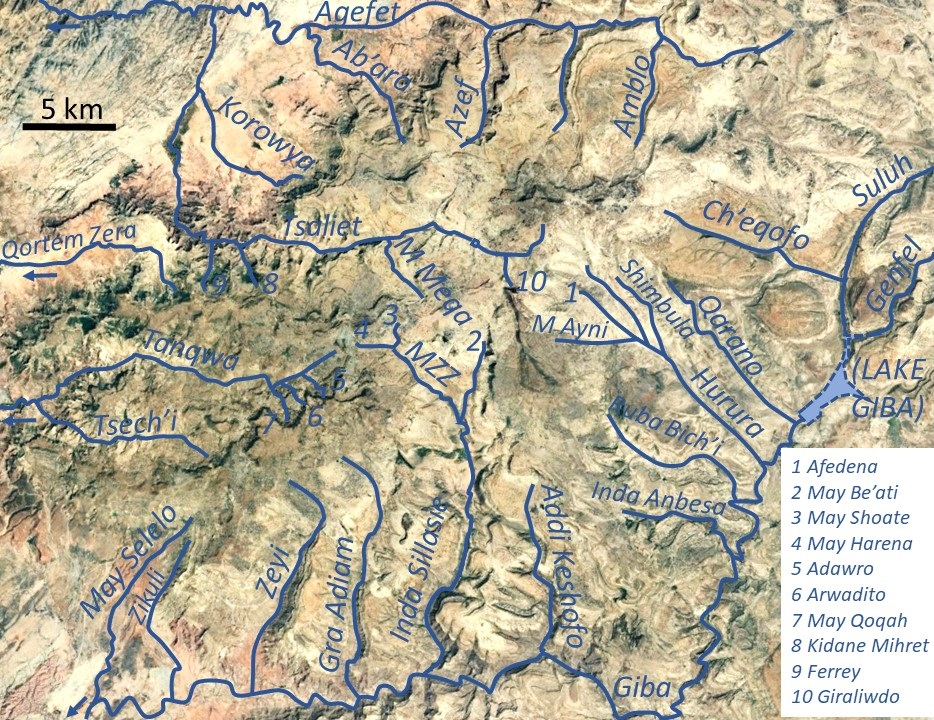
The river in the radial drainage network of Dogu’a Tembien

== Characteristics ==
It is a confined bedrock river, with an average slope gradient of 102 metres per kilometre. With its tributaries, the river has cut a deep gorge.

== Flash floods and flood buffering ==
Runoff mostly happens in the form of high runoff discharge events that occur in a very short period (called flash floods). These are related to the steep topography, often little vegetation cover and intense convective rainfall. The peaks of such flash floods have often a 50 to 100 times larger discharge than the preceding baseflow. The magnitude of floods in to a certain extent buffered by the presence of the large Awhi Dur forest in its catchment. Also, exclosures have been established; the dense vegetation largely contributes to enhanced infiltration, less flooding and better baseflow. Physical conservation structures such as stone bunds and check dams also intercept runoff.

== Transhumance towards the gorge ==
Transhumance takes place in the summer rainy season, when the lands near the villages are occupied by crops. Young shepherds will take the village cattle down to the lower valley and overnight in small caves. The valley bottom is particularly attractive as a transhumance destination zone, because there is water and good growth of semi-natural vegetation.

== Boulders and pebbles in the river bed ==
Boulders and pebbles encountered in the river bed can originate from any location higher up in the catchment. In the uppermost stretches of the river, only rock fragments of the upper lithological units will be present in the river bed, whereas more downstream one may find a more comprehensive mix of all lithologies crossed by the river. From upstream to downstream, the following lithological units occur in the catchment.

- Upper basalt
- Interbedded lacustrine deposits
- Lower basalt
- Amba Aradam Formation
- Antalo Limestone
- Adigrat Sandstone

== Trekking along the river ==
Trekking routes have been established across and along this river. The tracks are not marked on the ground but can be followed using downloaded .GPX files.

- Trek 3, along Tsaliet, near the outlet of Kidane Mihret
- Trek 4, across the upper catchment in Waseiya village

In the rainy season, flash floods may occur and it is advised not to follow the river bed. At times it may be impossible to cross the river in the rainy season.

== See also ==
- List of Ethiopian rivers
