= Korowya =

River in the Tembien highlands of Ethiopia

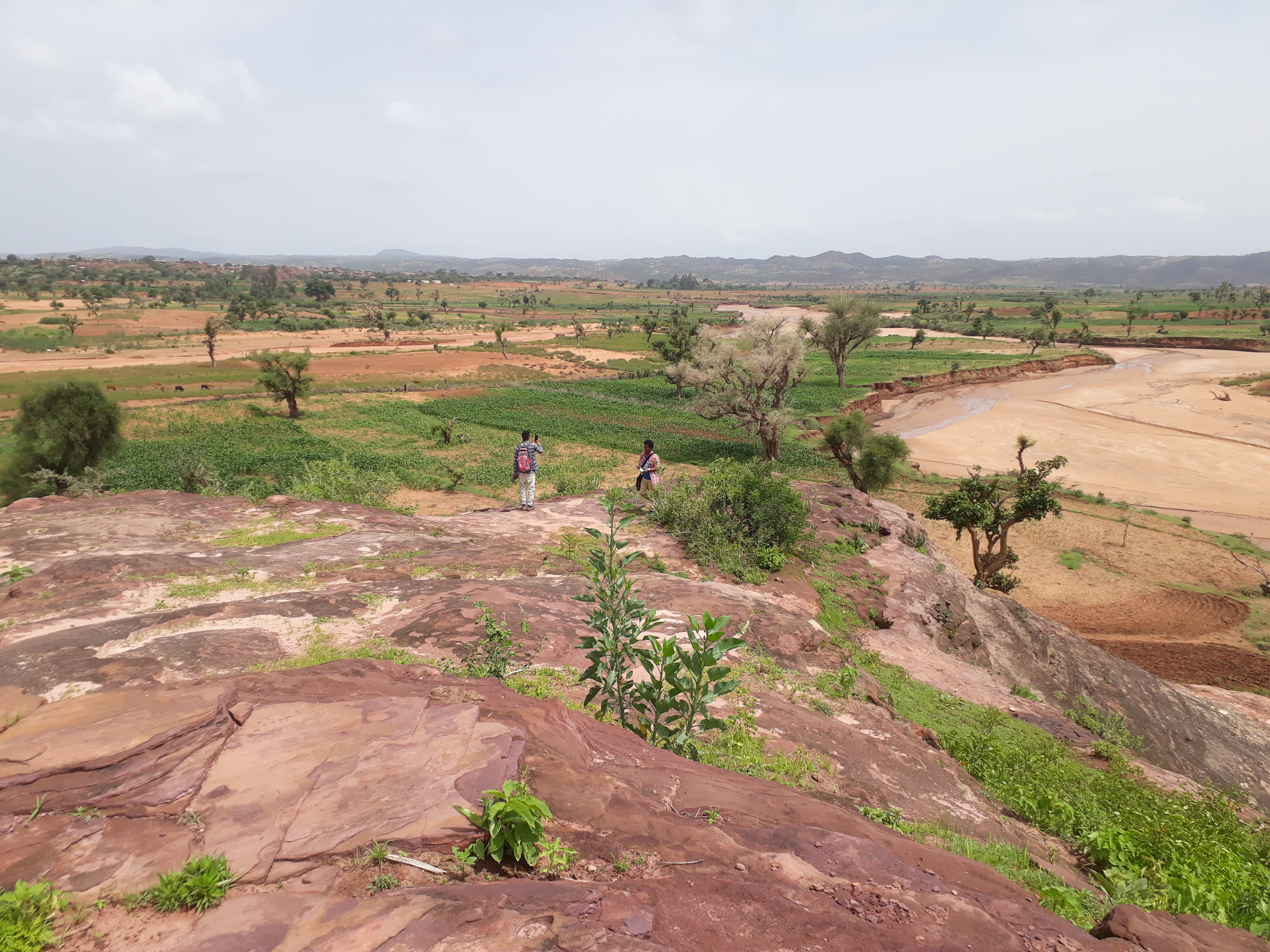
- The Korowya River at Addi Kawa

- Korowya River in Kola Tembien
- Etymology: Named after the homonymous village

Location
- Country: Ethiopia
- Region: Tigray Region
- District (woreda): Kola Tembien

Physical characteristics
- Source: Slopes of Tsili
  - location: Haddinnet municipality
  - elevation: 1,908 m (6,260 ft)
- Mouth: Tsaliet River
  - location: 3.5 km north of Addeha
  - coordinates: 13.4657°N 39.1011°E
  - elevation: 1,643 m (5,390 ft)
- Length: 12 km (7.5 mi)
- Width
  - average: 50 m (160 ft)

Basin features
- Progression: Tsaliet→ Wari→ Tekezé→ Atbarah→ Nile→ Mediterranean Sea
- River system: Permanent river (low baseflow)
- Landmarks: Mt. Itay Sarah, Mika’el Samba and Maryam Hibeto rock churches
- Bridges: N of Addeha, on the road to Hawzien
- Topography: Pediment surrounded by steep sandstone mountains

The Korowya is a river of the Nile basin. Rising in the mountains of Dogu’a Tembien in northern Ethiopia, it flows westward to empty finally in the Weri’i and Tekezé River.

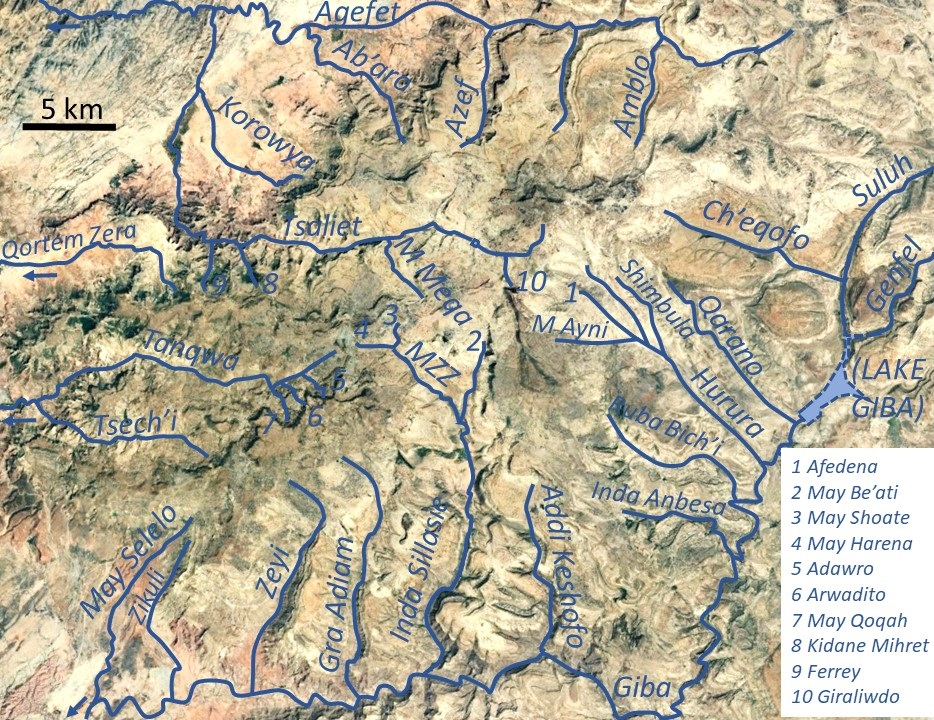
The river in the radial drainage network of Dogu’a Tembien

== Characteristics ==
It is a meandering stream in a semi-confined alluvial plain, with an average slope gradient of 31 metres per kilometre.

== Flash floods and flood buffering ==
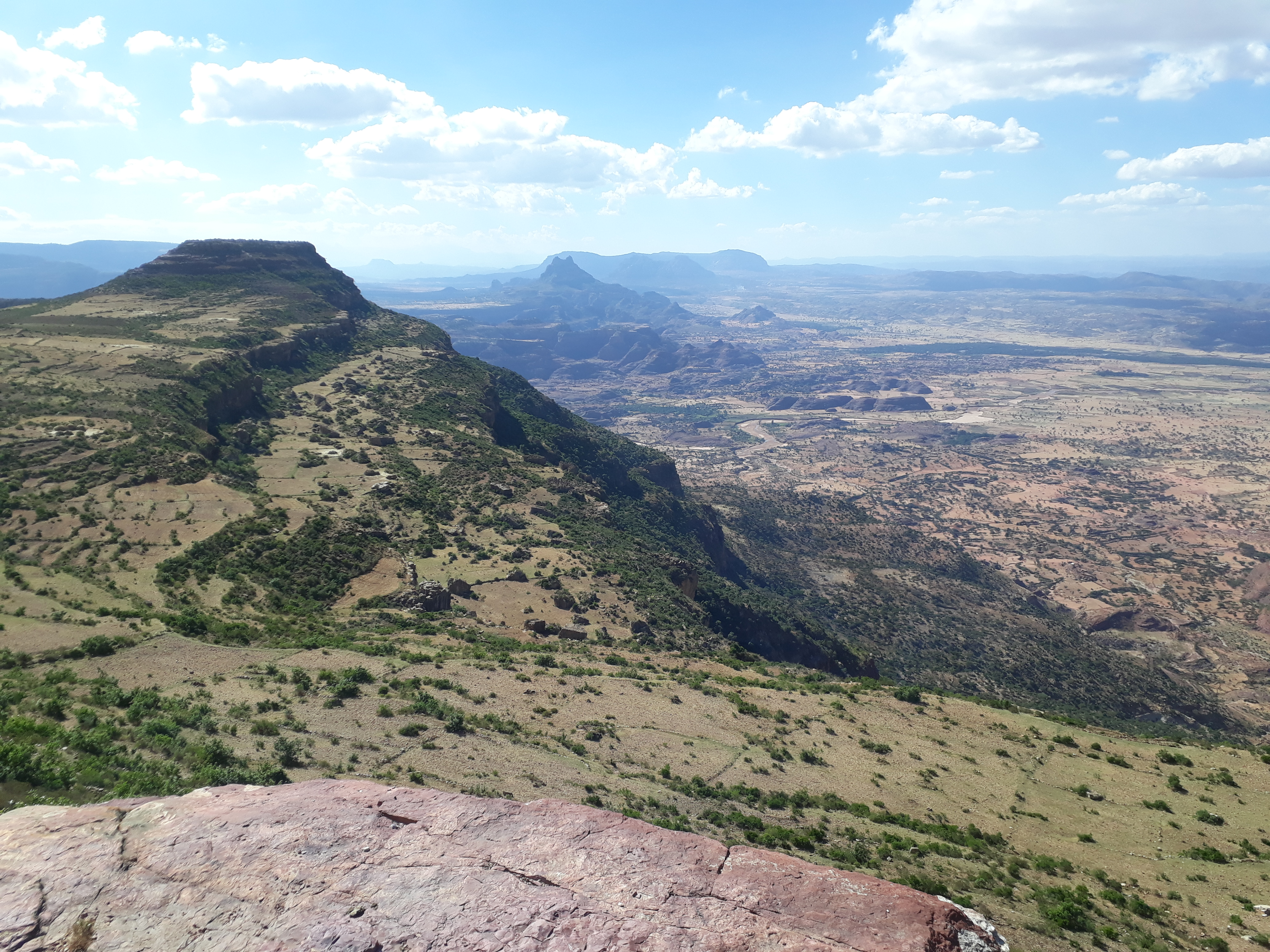
View from Tsili upper catchment towards Korowya

Runoff mostly happens in the form of high runoff discharge events that occur in a very short period (called flash floods). These are related to the steep topography, often little vegetation cover and intense convective rainfall. The peaks of such flash floods have often a 50 to 100 times larger discharge than the preceding baseflow. The magnitude of floods in this river has not been decreased due to interventions in the catchment. Physical conservation structures such as stone bunds and check dams are few and insufficient. On many steep slopes, there are remnant forests; the dense vegetation contributes to enhanced infiltration, but cannot buffer the floods.

== Irrigated agriculture ==
Irrigation is strongly dependent on the river's baseflow. Such irrigated agriculture is important in meeting the demands for food security and poverty reduction. Irrigated lands are established in the lower alluvial plains of Korowya River, and near springs at the headwaters.

== Boulders and pebbles in the river bed ==
From upstream to downstream, the following lithological units occur in the catchment.

- Lower basalt
- Amba Aradam Formation
- Antalo Limestone
- Adigrat Sandstone

Mostly the river bed is composed of sand, but one may find some pebbles, representing a mix of all lithologies crossed by the river.

== From upper to lower Tembien ==
During its course, this river passes through two woredas. On the various parts:

- The headwaters are in Dogu’a Tembien
- Most of the lower plain is in Kola Tembien

== Trekking along the river ==
A trekking route has been established along this river. The tracks are not marked on the ground but can be followed using downloaded .GPX files.

- Trek 21, along and parallel to Korowya River

In the rainy season, flash floods may occur and it is advised not to follow the river bed. At times it may be impossible to cross the river in the rainy season.

== See also ==
- List of Ethiopian rivers
