= Debano massacre =

Massacre in Debano, Central Tigray as part of Tigray war

Coordinates: 13.777128°N 38.991002°E

- Part of Tigray War
- Location of Debano in Tigray (Ethiopia)
- Location: Debano (Tigrinya: ደባኖ), Tigray Region, Ethiopia
- Date: 11 January 2021
- Target: Tigrayans
- Attack type: Mass killing; Shelling
- Deaths: at least 30 civilians
- Perpetrator: Amhara Region Special Force

The Debano massacre was a mass extrajudicial killing that took place in Debano (Tigrinya: ደባኖ) in the Tigray Region of Ethiopia during the Tigray War, around 11 January 2021. Debano, also called Endabano, is a tabiya that belongs to woreda Kayeh Tehli, Central zone of Tigray.

== Massacre ==
The Amhara Region’s armed forces killed dozens of civilians in Debano (Central Tigray) on 11 January 2021. Debano comprises four villages, by decreasing order of importance: Sagla, Serawit, Daba Paulos, and Daba Tadios. Homesteads are scattered and population density is low. It is a hilly land with altitudes varying from 1416 to 1624 m a.s.l., on the southern banks of the Weri’i River; there are numerous bushlands. There was fighting in Debano between ENDF and TDF; the people fled to mountains near Weri’i River, away from the road.

The Amhara forces who came following the Ethiopian army entered the village and massacred anyone they found. Young as well as old people unable to stand were all massacred. In the small village of Debano, Kibrom says he alone knows 30 people that have been killed. Properties have been looted and vandalized. For instance, water jerrycans were either taken or pierced with sharp things making them unusable. The school of Debano has been looted. — Kibrom, eyewitness,

Later that day, Kibrom was wounded while walking on a mine, and two of his friends were killed. Both Kibrom’s legs have been amputated.

== Perpetrators ==
Eyewitness and victim Kibrom interpreted the identity of the perpetrators as soldiers of Amhara Region’s special forces.

== Victims ==
The “Tigray: Atlas of the humanitarian situation” mentions approximately 30 victims.

== Reactions ==
The “Tigray: Atlas of the humanitarian situation”, that documented this massacre received international media attention, particularly regarding its Annex A, that lists massacres in the Tigray War.

After months of denial by the Ethiopian authorities that massacres occurred in Tigray, a joint investigation by OHCHR and the Ethiopian Human Rights Commission was announced in March 2021.
