= Ferrey River =

River in the Tembien highlands of Ethiopia

Ferrey
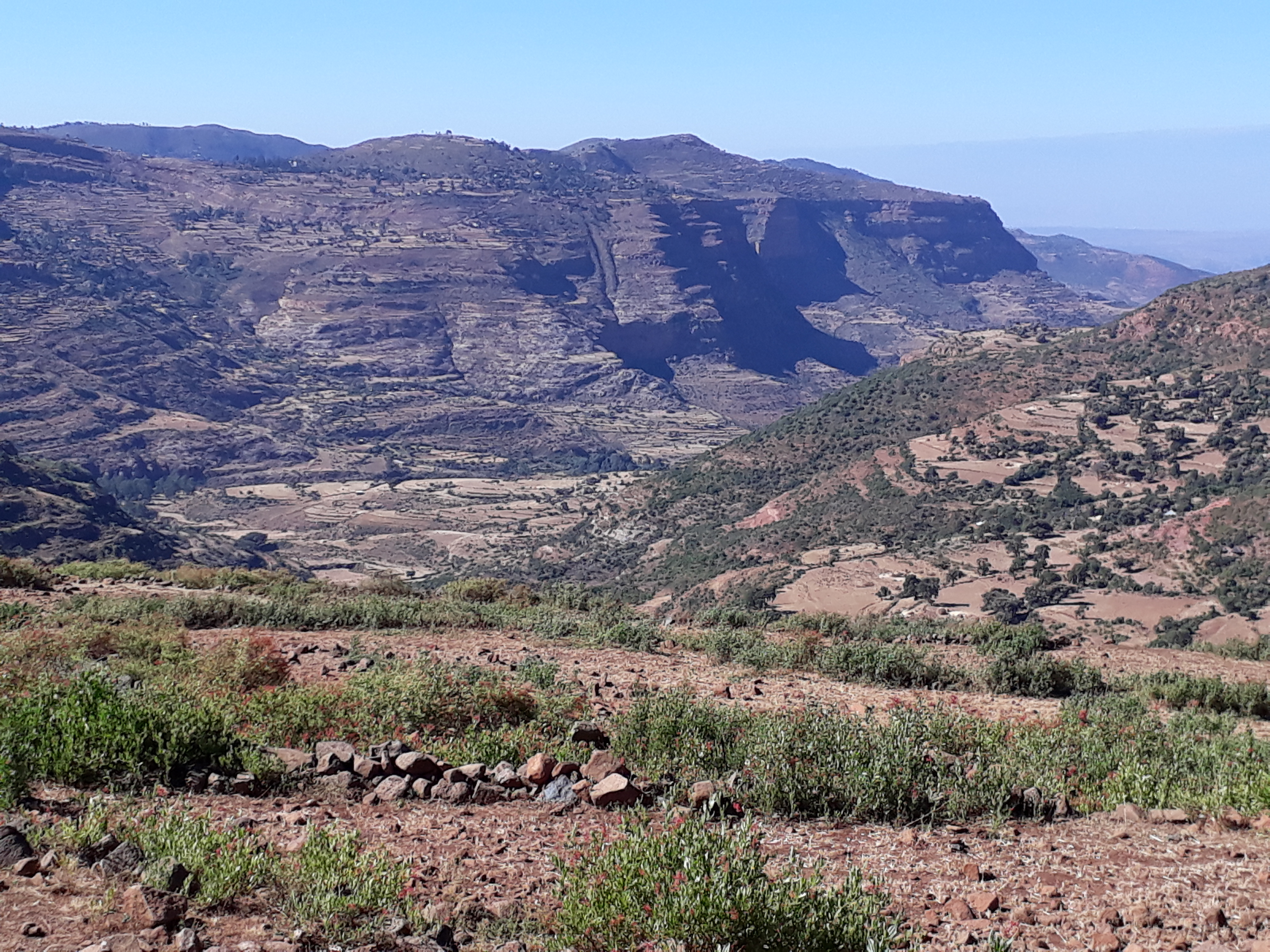
- The Ferrey valley

- Ferrey River in Dogu’a Tembien

Location
- Country: Ethiopia
- Region: Tigray Region
- District (woreda): Dogu’a Tembien

Physical characteristics
- Source: Ferrey
  - location: Degol Woyane municipality
  - elevation: 2,203 m (7,228 ft)
- Mouth: Tsaliet River
  - location: Underneath Dabba Selama monastery
  - coordinates: 13.696°N 39.104°E
  - elevation: 1,780 m (5,840 ft)
- Length: 3 km (1.9 mi)
- Width
  - average: 7 m (23 ft)

Basin features
- Progression: Tsaliet→ Wari→ Tekezé→ Atbarah→ Nile→ Mediterranean Sea
- River system: Permanent river
- Landmarks: Ferrey gardens, Dabba Selama monastery
- Waterfalls: Numerous rapids
- Topography: Mountains and deep gorges

The Ferrey is a river of the Nile basin. Rising in the mountains of Dogu’a Tembien in northern Ethiopia, it flows northward to empty finally in the Weri’i which in turn flows into Tekezé River.

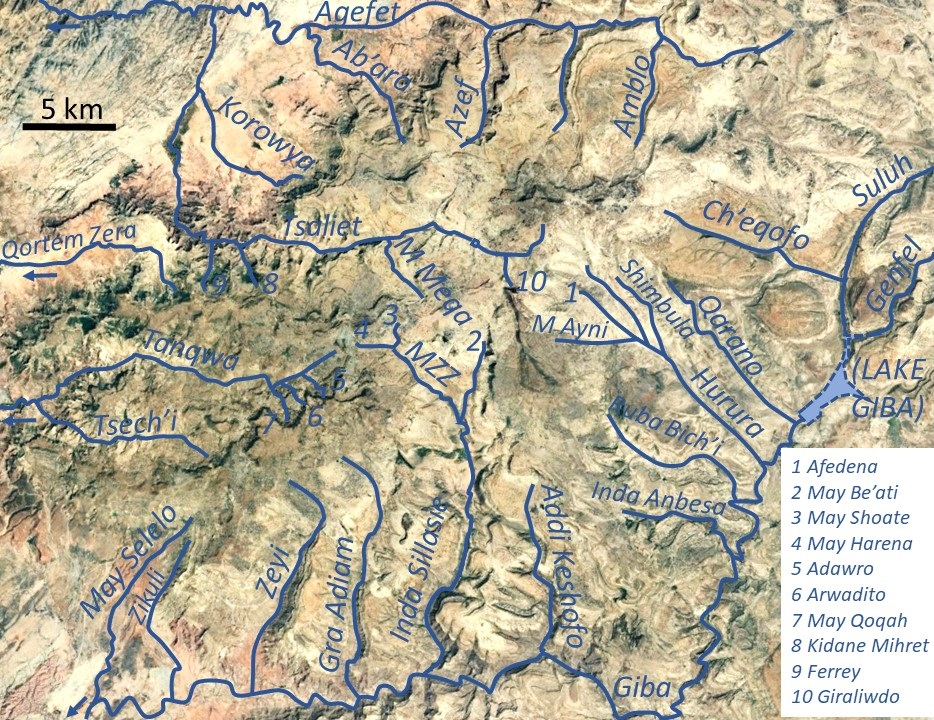
The river in the radial drainage network of Dogu’a Tembien

== Characteristics ==
It is a confined bedrock river, with an average slope gradient of 141 metres per kilometre.

== Flash floods and flood buffering ==
Runoff mostly happens in the form of high runoff discharge events that occur in a very short period (called flash floods). These are related to the steep topography, often little vegetation cover and intense convective rainfall. The peaks of such flash floods have often a 50 to 100 times larger discharge than the preceding baseflow. The magnitude of floods in this river has however been decreased due to interventions in the catchment: exclosures have been established; the dense vegetation largely contributes to enhanced infiltration, less flooding and better baseflow. Physical conservation structures such as stone bunds and check dams also intercept runoff.

== Irrigated agriculture ==
In the valley head there are many springs that have allowed an age-old irrigation system to be established. Such irrigated agriculture is important in meeting the demands for food security and poverty reduction. The irrigated lands allow growing tropical fruits such as a local banana cultivar, lime and trunghi.

== Transhumance towards the gorge ==
Transhumance takes place in the summer rainy season, when the lands near the villages are occupied by crops. Young shepherds will take the village cattle down to the lower parts of the valley and overnight in small caves. The lower valley is particularly attractive as a transhumance destination zone, because there is water and good growth of semi-natural vegetation.

== Boulders and pebbles in the river bed ==
Boulders and pebbles encountered in the river bed can originate from any location higher up in the catchment. In the uppermost stretches of the river, only rock fragments of the upper lithological units will be present in the river bed, whereas more downstream one may find a more comprehensive mix of all lithologies crossed by the river. From upstream to downstream, the following lithological units occur in the catchment.

- Upper basalt
- Interbedded lacustrine deposits
- Lower basalt
- Amba Aradam Formation
- Antalo Limestone
- Adigrat Sandstone

== Trekking along the river ==
Trekking routes have been established across and along this river. The tracks are not marked on the ground but can be followed using downloaded .GPX files.

- Trek 4, across the valley head with its tropical gardens

In the rainy season, flash floods may occur and it is advised not to follow the river bed.

== See also ==
- List of Ethiopian rivers
