= May Leiba =

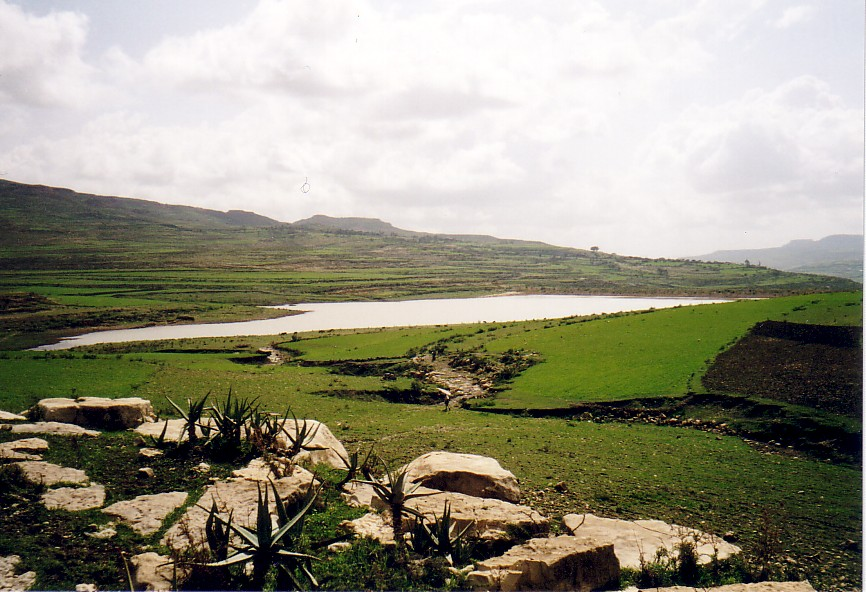

- Location within Ethiopia
- Coordinates: 13.694046°N 39.233739°E
- Type: Freshwater artificial lake
- Primary inflows: May Leiba River
- Basin countries: Ethiopia
- Surface area: 0.16 km^{2} (0.062 sq mi)
- Water volume: 0.958×10^{6} m^{3} (777 acre⋅ft)
- Surface elevation: 2,290 m (7,510 ft)
- Settlements: Addi Qoylo

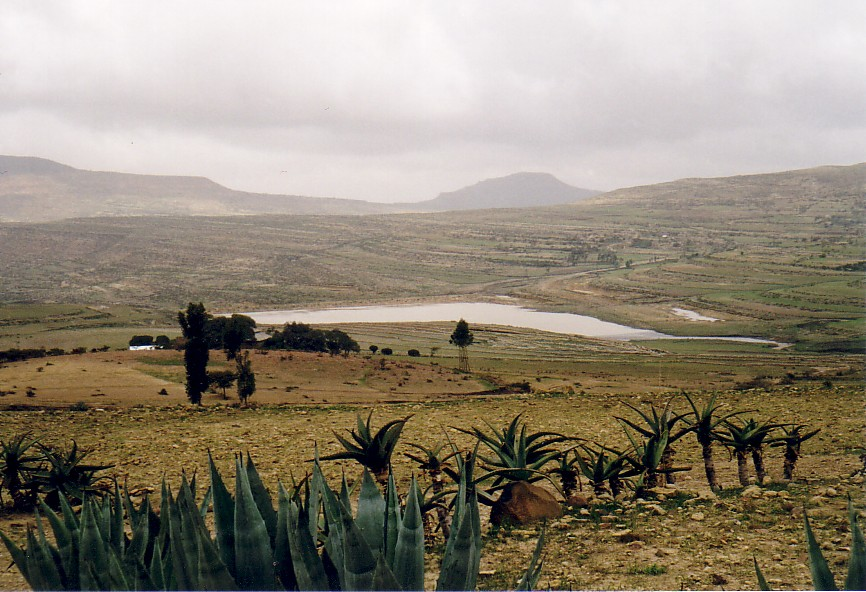
May Leiba

May Leiba is a reservoir located in the Dogu’a Tembien woreda of the Tigray Region in Ethiopia. It is named after the May Leiba River. The earthen dam that holds the reservoir was built in 1998 by the Relief Society of Tigray.

== Dam characteristics ==
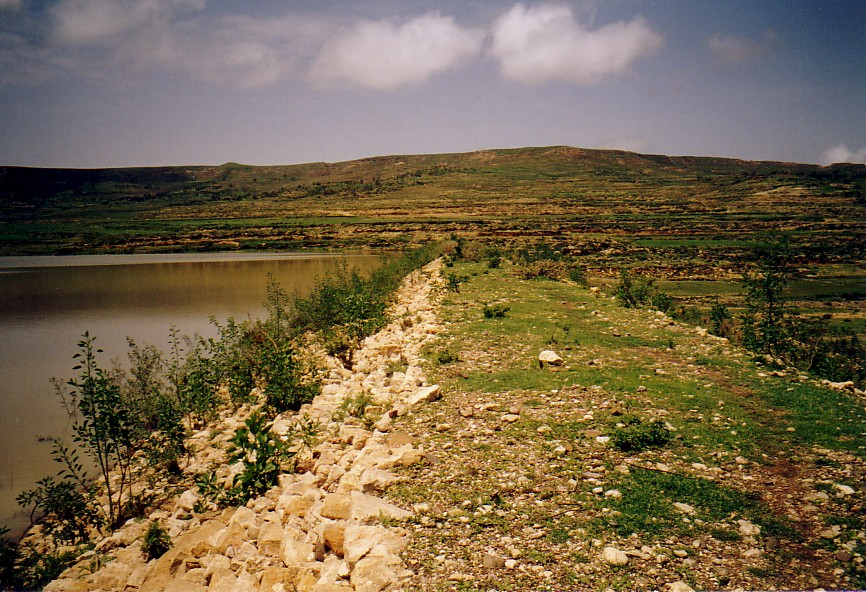
May Leiba dam

- Dam height: 18.9 metres
- Dam crest length: 371 metres
- Spillway width: 25 metres

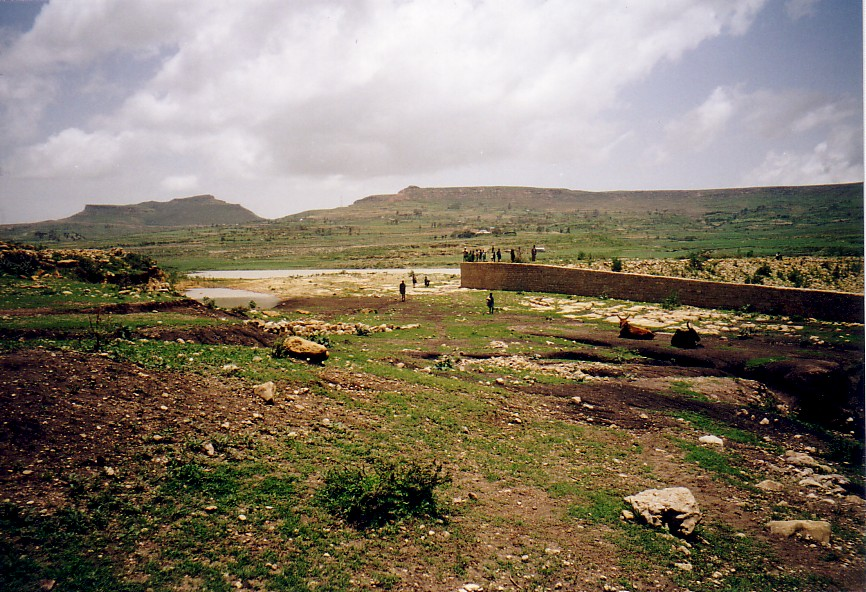
May Leiba spillway

== Capacity ==
- Original capacity: 958 175 m^{3}
- Dead storage: 191 635 m^{3}
- Reservoir area: 16 ha

In 2002, the life expectancy of the reservoir (the duration before it is filled with sediment) was estimated at 15 years.

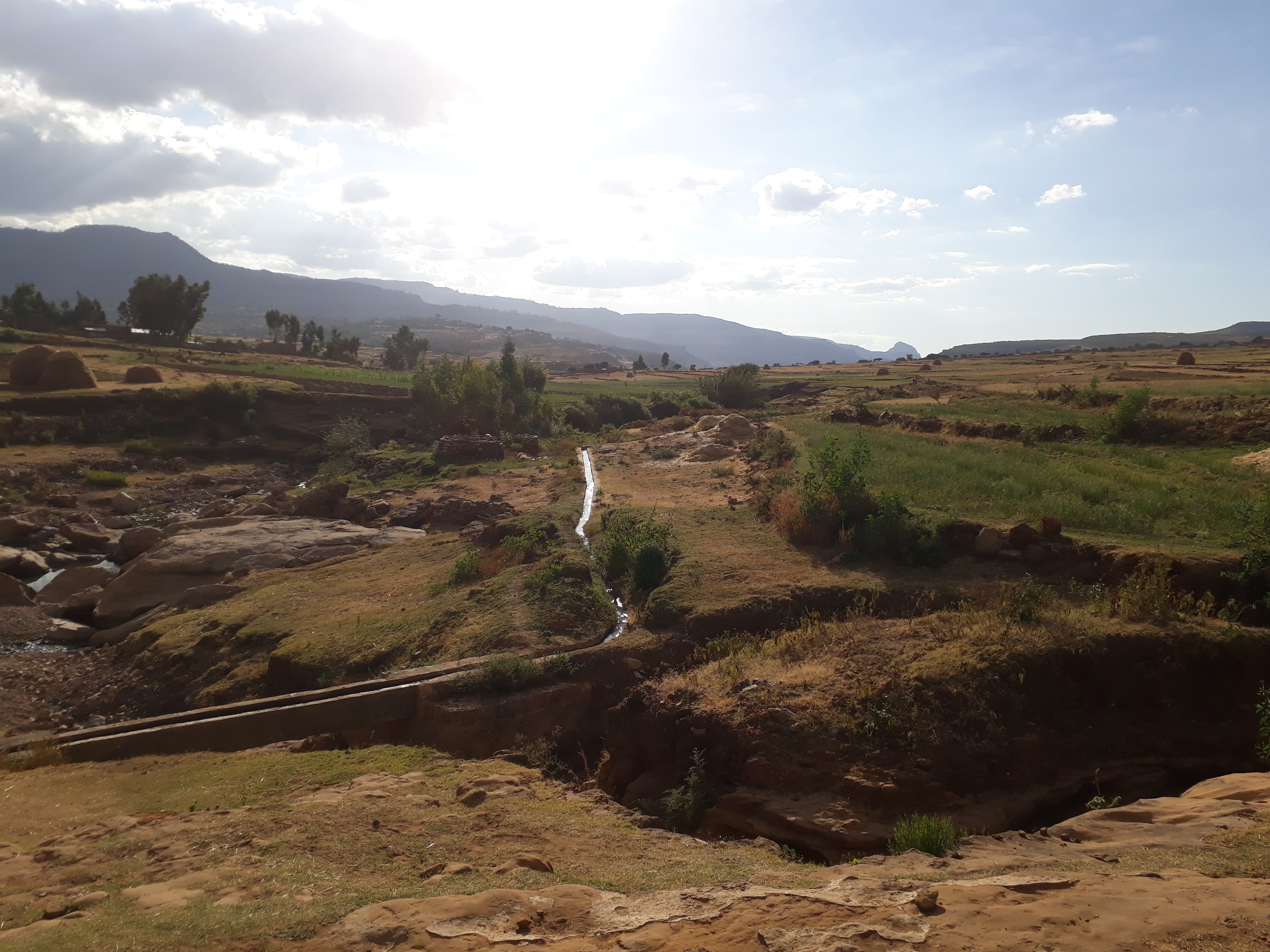
Irrigation scheme in Addi Idaga, using seepage water from May Leiba

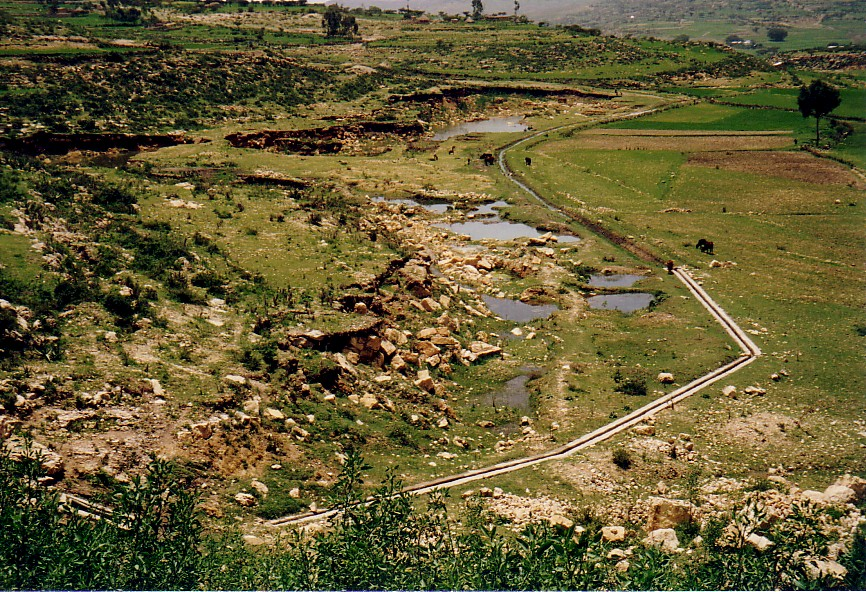
May Leiba - irrigation canal that remains largely unused

== Irrigation ==
- Designed irrigated area: 50 ha
- Actual irrigated area in 2002: 5 ha

A first problem is administrative: the dam is located in one ‘’tabia’’ and the command area in another ‘’tabia’’, leading to disagreements with regard to the sharing of the water. The larger part of the water that could be used for formal irrigation is lost through seepage across the limestone; the positive side-effect is that this contributes to groundwater recharge, particularly around the downstream settlement of Addi Idaga, where a large irrigation perimeter has been developed.

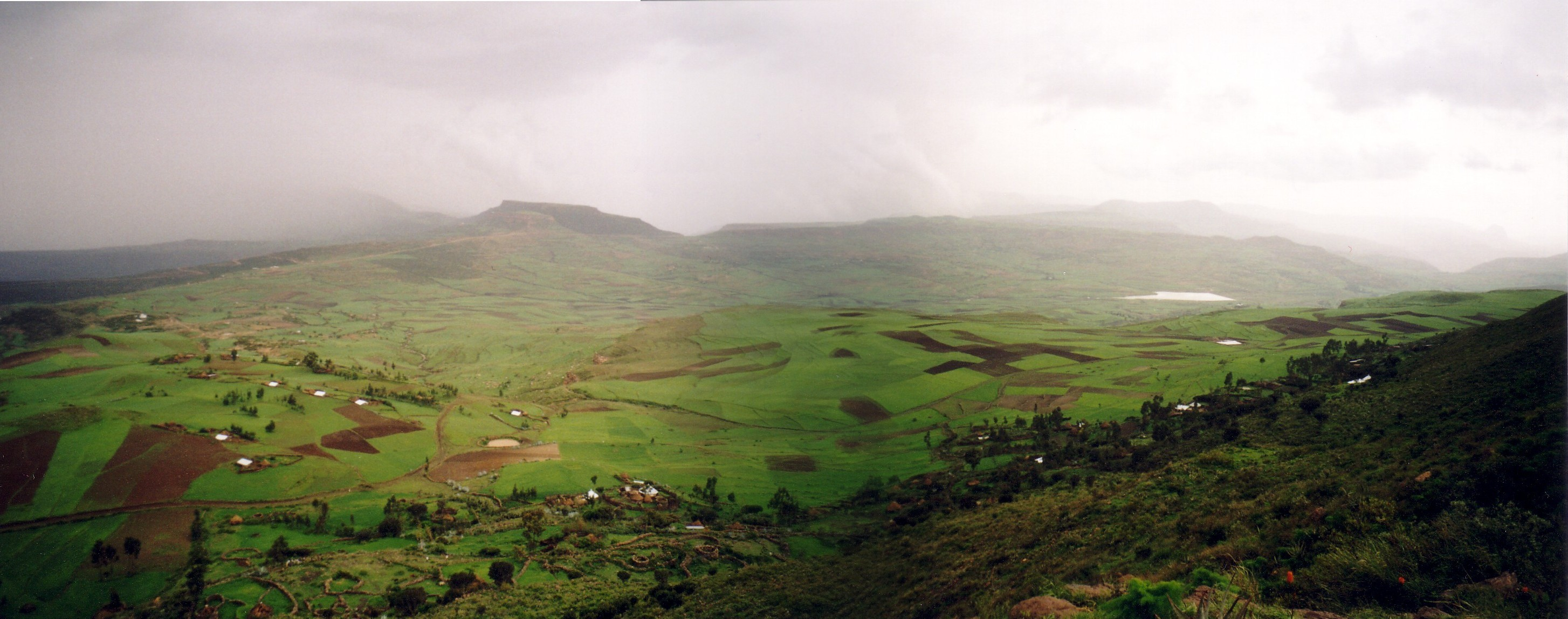
May Leiba catchment

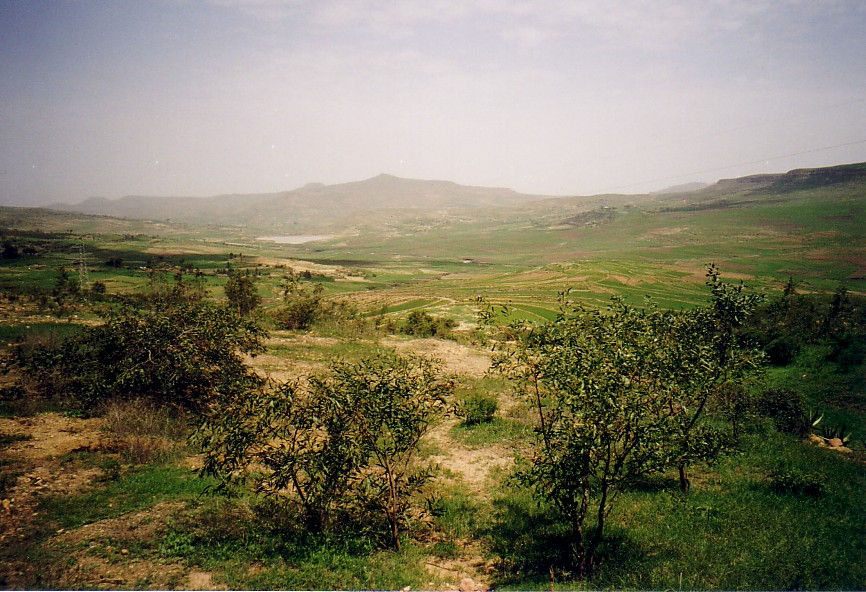
May Leiba catchment

== Reservoir catchment ==
The catchment of May Leiba reservoir is 17.87 km² large, with a perimeter of 17.61 km and a length of 4540 metres.

== Environment ==
The lithology of the catchment of the reservoir is Antalo Limestone, Agula Shale, sandstone of the Amba Aradam Formation and Ashangi Basalts. The main driving factors that define the variability in soil types in this catchment are: 1) geology, through soil parent material and the occurrence of harder layers, often acting as aquitards or aquicludes; 2) occurrence of mass movement deposits that occupy large areas of the catchment; and 3) anthropogenic soil erosion and deposition. These factors lead to “red-black” Skeletic Cambisol–Pellic Vertisol soil catenas on basalt and Calcaric Regosol–Colluvic Calcaric Cambisol–Calcaric Vertisol catenas on Antalo Limestone. The reservoir suffers from rapid siltation. Attempts have been done to reuse the reservoir sediment for crop production. While this doubled the garlic yield, it proved also to be a costly venture to transport the sediment from the dry lake bottom to nearby barren land in order to establish the plots.
