= Mahbere Sillasie =

Municipality in Tigray Region, Ethiopia

- Municipality
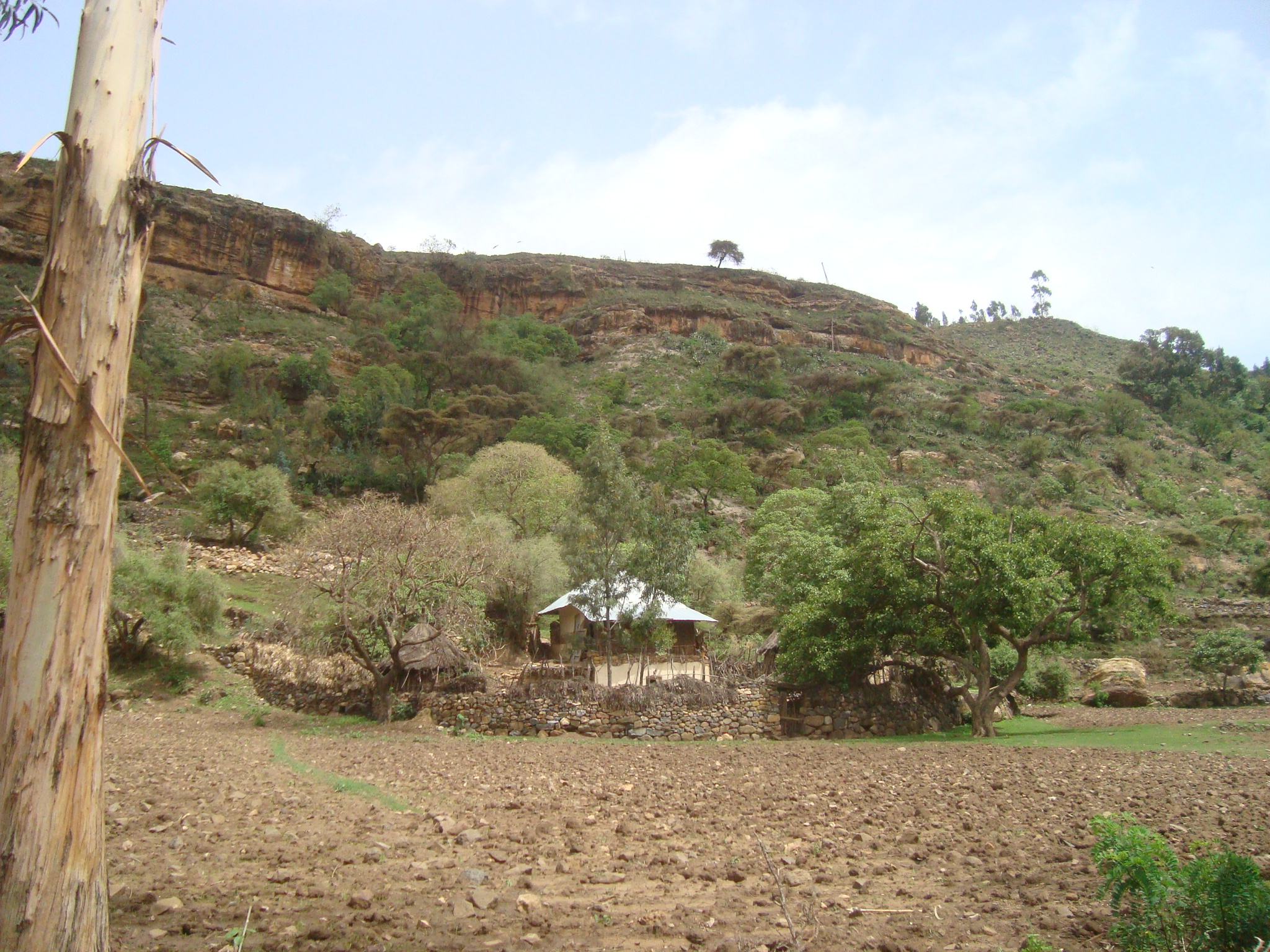
- Sandstone cliffs where the TPLF cave is located

- Location within Ethiopia
- Coordinates: 13°39′N 39°9′E
- Country: Ethiopia
- Region: Tigray
- Zone: Debub Misraqawi (Southeastern)
- Woreda: Dogu'a Tembien

Area
  - Total: 32.8 km^{2} (12.7 sq mi)
- Elevation: 2,580 m (8,460 ft)

Population (2007)
  - Total: 5,022
  - Density: 153/km^{2} (400/sq mi)
- Time zone: UTC+3 (EAT)

Mahbere Sillasie is a tabia or municipality in the Dogu'a Tembien district of the Tigray Region of Ethiopia. The tabia centre is in Guderbo village, located approximately 2.5 km to the west-northwest of the woreda town Hagere Selam.

== Geography ==
The tabia stretches down from the ridge west of Hagere Selam, northbound towards Tsaliet river. The highest peak is just south of Guderbo (2730 m a.s.l.) and the lowest place deep in the Tsaliet gorge (1780 m a.s.l.).

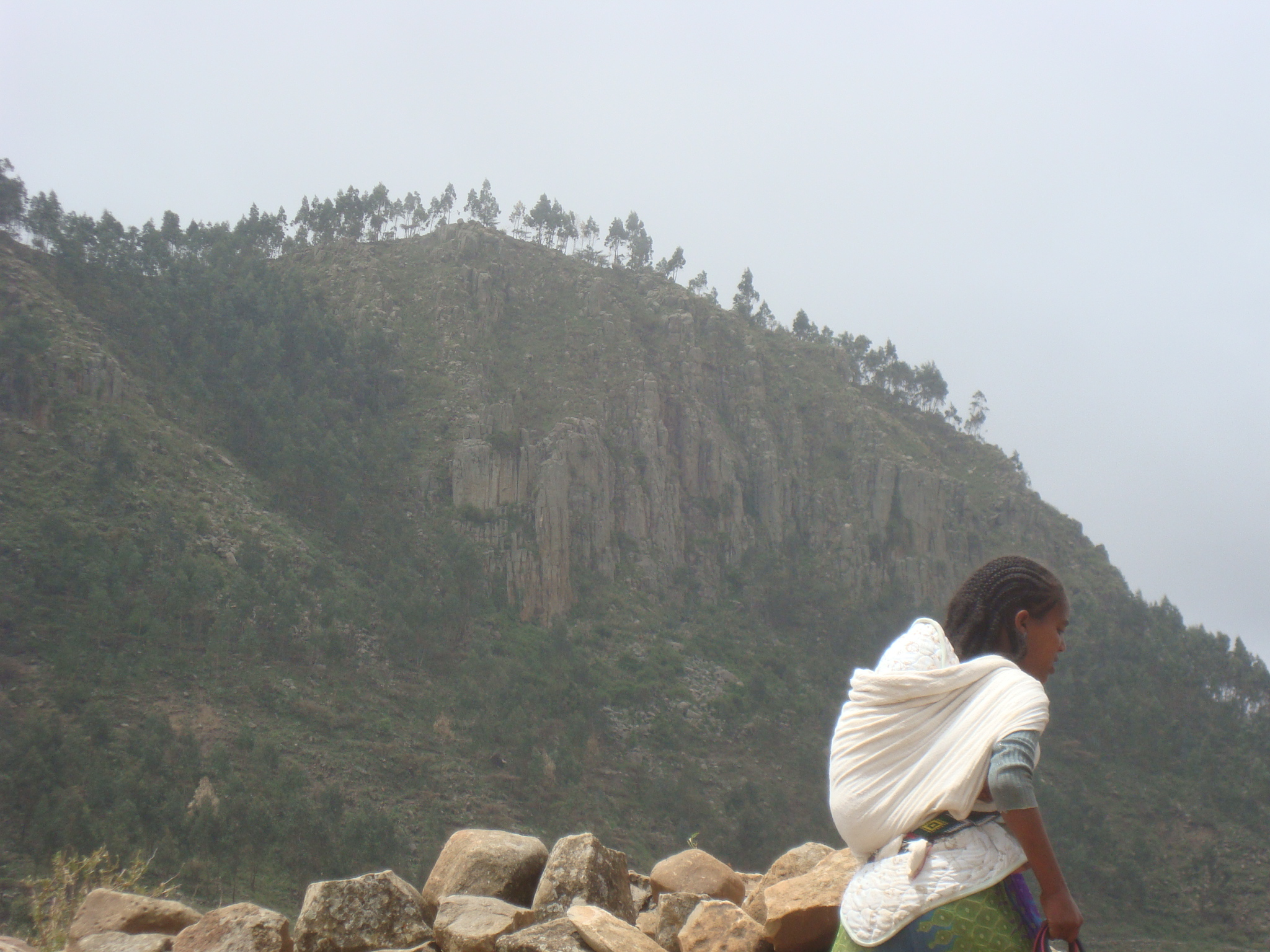
Phonolite plug at Addi Amyuq

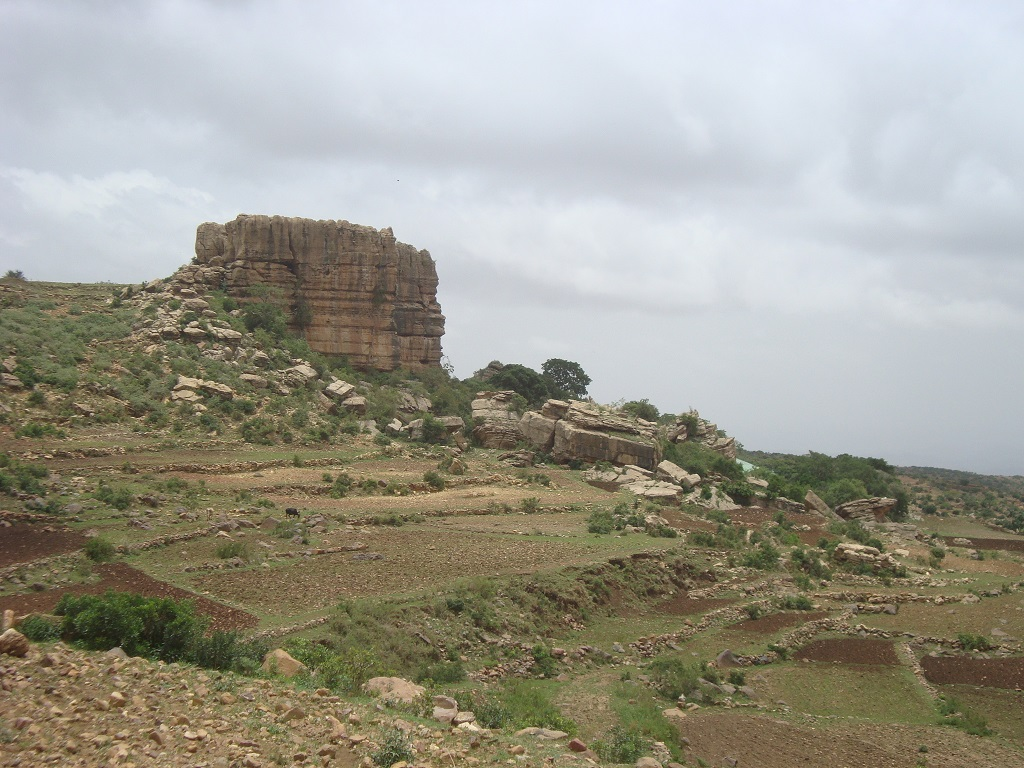
Antalo Limestone outcrop at Kurkura hosting a rock church

=== Geology ===
From the higher to the lower locations, the following geological formations are present:

- Phonolite plugs
- Upper basalt
- Interbedded lacustrine deposits
- Lower basalt
- Amba Aradam Formation
- Antalo Limestone
- Adigrat Sandstone

=== Climate ===
The rainfall pattern shows a very high seasonality with 70 to 80% of the annual rain falling in July and August. Mean temperature in Guderbo is 17.4 °C, oscillating between average daily minimum of 9.6 °C and maximum of 24.8 °C. The contrasts between day and night air temperatures are much larger than seasonal contrasts.

=== Springs ===
As there are no permanent rivers, the presence of springs is of utmost importance for the local people. The main springs in the tabia are:

- Addi Geza'iti
- May Zeleqo in Guderbo
- Addi Anefti in May Mereb

=== Reservoirs ===
In this area with rains that last only for a couple of months per year, reservoirs of different sizes allow harvesting runoff from the rainy season for further use in the dry season. Overall they suffer from siltation. Yet, they strongly contribute to greening the landscape, either through irrigation or seepage water.

- Chini (reservoir), near May Mereb, constructed in 1993
- Traditional surface water harvesting ponds, particularly in places without permanent springs, called rahaya
- Horoyo, household ponds, recently constructed through campaigns – they were particularly studied in Mahbere Sillasie

=== Settlements ===
The tabia centre Guderbo holds a few administrative offices, a health post, a primary school, and some small shops. There are a few more primary schools across the tabia. The main other populated places are:

- Addi Geza'iti
- Harehuwa
- Kurkura
- May Mereb
- Waseiya
- Addi Amyuq (half of the settlement, the other half belongs to Selam)

=== Vegetation and exclosures ===
The tabia holds several exclosures, areas that are set aside for regreening, such as Harehuwa exclosure. Wood harvesting and livestock range are not allowed there. Besides effects on biodiversity, water infiltration, protection from flooding, sediment deposition, carbon sequestration, people commonly have economic benefits from these exclosures through grass harvesting, beekeeping and other non-timber forest products. The local inhabitants also consider it as “land set aside for future generations”.

== Agriculture and livelihood ==
=== Crop farming ===
The population lives essentially from crop farming, supplemented with off-season work in nearby towns. The land is dominated by farmlands which are clearly demarcated and are cropped every year. Hence the agricultural system is a permanent upland farming system. The farmers have adapted their cropping systems to the spatio-temporal variability in rainfall.

=== Schools ===
Almost all children of the tabia are schooled, though in some schools there is lack of classrooms, directly related to the large intake in primary schools over the last decades. Schools in the tabia include the Harehuwa school.

== History and culture ==
=== History ===
The history of the tabia is strongly confounded with the history of Tembien. In the 1980s, the TPLF, established its headquarters in a cave in Addi Geza'iti. From these underground rooms and offices cut out in sandstone cliffs, the TPLF carried out its political activities, including a major land reform; it was from here that the offensives were organised till the conquest of Addis Ababa in 1991.

=== Religion and churches ===
Most inhabitants are Orthodox Christians. The following churches are located in the tabia:

- Addi Geza'iti Maryam
- Kurkura Mika'el
- Harehuwa Medhanie Alem
- May Mereb Sillasie
- Waseiya Maryam
- Kidane Mihret in the large "Awhi Dur" forest

=== Inda Siwa, the local beer houses ===
In the main villages, there are traditional beer houses (Inda Siwa), often in unique settings, which are a good place for resting and chatting with the local people. Most renown in the tabia are

- Kashi Araya Gebreyohannes at Guderbo
- Hndeya Girmay at May Mereb

== Roads and communication ==
The main road Mekelle – Hagere Selam – Abiy Addi runs southeast of the tabia. Further, rural access road link most villages to Guderbo and further to the main asphalt road.

== Tourism ==
Its mountainous nature and proximity to Mekelle makes the tabia fit for tourism.

Ceiling of the Kurkura Mika'el rock church

=== Tourist attractions ===
- The scenic views on Tsaliet gorge
- The TPLF caves, which hold also a set of tactical maps used during the Ethiopian Civil War
- The church of Kurkura Mika'el, in a very scenic position in a small forest behind limestone pinnacles, is some 30 years old. Behind it is the remnant of the earlier church established in a natural cave of 20 metres by 20 metres. The roof of the cave is covered with sooth, evidencing the fact that the villagers took cover here, during the Italian bombardments of the Tembien battles in the mid-1930s.
- An open-air museum (under construction), half-way between Guderbo and Hagere Selam
- Awhi Dur, the largest forest of the woreda

=== Geotourism sites ===
The high variability of geological formations and the rugged topography invites for geological and geographic tourism or "geotourism". Geosites in the tabia include:

- Phonolite plugs at Addi Amyuq
- Ch'ench'eroma terraced landscape
- Harehuwa forest and exclosure
- Tsaliet gorge

=== Birdwatching ===
Birdwatching (for the species, see the main Dogu'a Tembien page) can be done particularly in exclosures and forests. The following bird-watching sites have been inventoried in the tabia and mapped.

- Harehuwa forest
- Awhi Dur forest

=== Trekking routes ===
Trekking routes have been established in this tabia. The tracks are not marked on the ground but can be followed using downloaded .GPX files.

- Trek 3, northbound and down across the tabia inside Tsaliet gorge, and then following the river to the rock churches in Addeha
- Trek 4, from Guderbo westbound down to the Dabba Selama monastery
- Trek 5, largely along the ridge on the southern edge of Mahbere Sillasie

=== Accommodation and facilities ===
The facilities are very basic. One may be invited to spend the night in a rural homestead or ask permission to pitch a tent. Hotels are available in Hagere Selam and Mekelle.

== See also ==
- Dogu'a Tembien
