= Addi Asme'e =

Lake in the Tigray Region of Ethiopia

Addi Asme’e
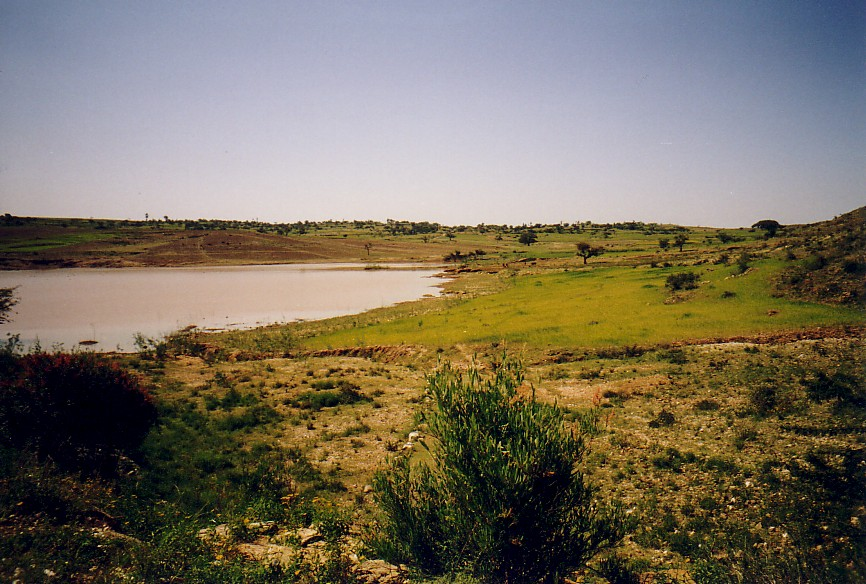

- Location within Ethiopia
- Coordinates: 13.64708044°N 38.96441171°E
- Type: Freshwater artificial lake
- Basin countries: Ethiopia
- Settlements: Abiy Addi

Addi Asme’e is a reservoir located in the Kola Tembien woreda of the Tigray Region in Ethiopia. The earthen dam that holds the reservoir was built in 1994, with a dam crest length of 287 metres.

== Environment ==
The reservoir suffers from rapid siltation. The lithology of the catchment is Precambrian metamorphic rock.
