= Wari River =

River in Ethiopia

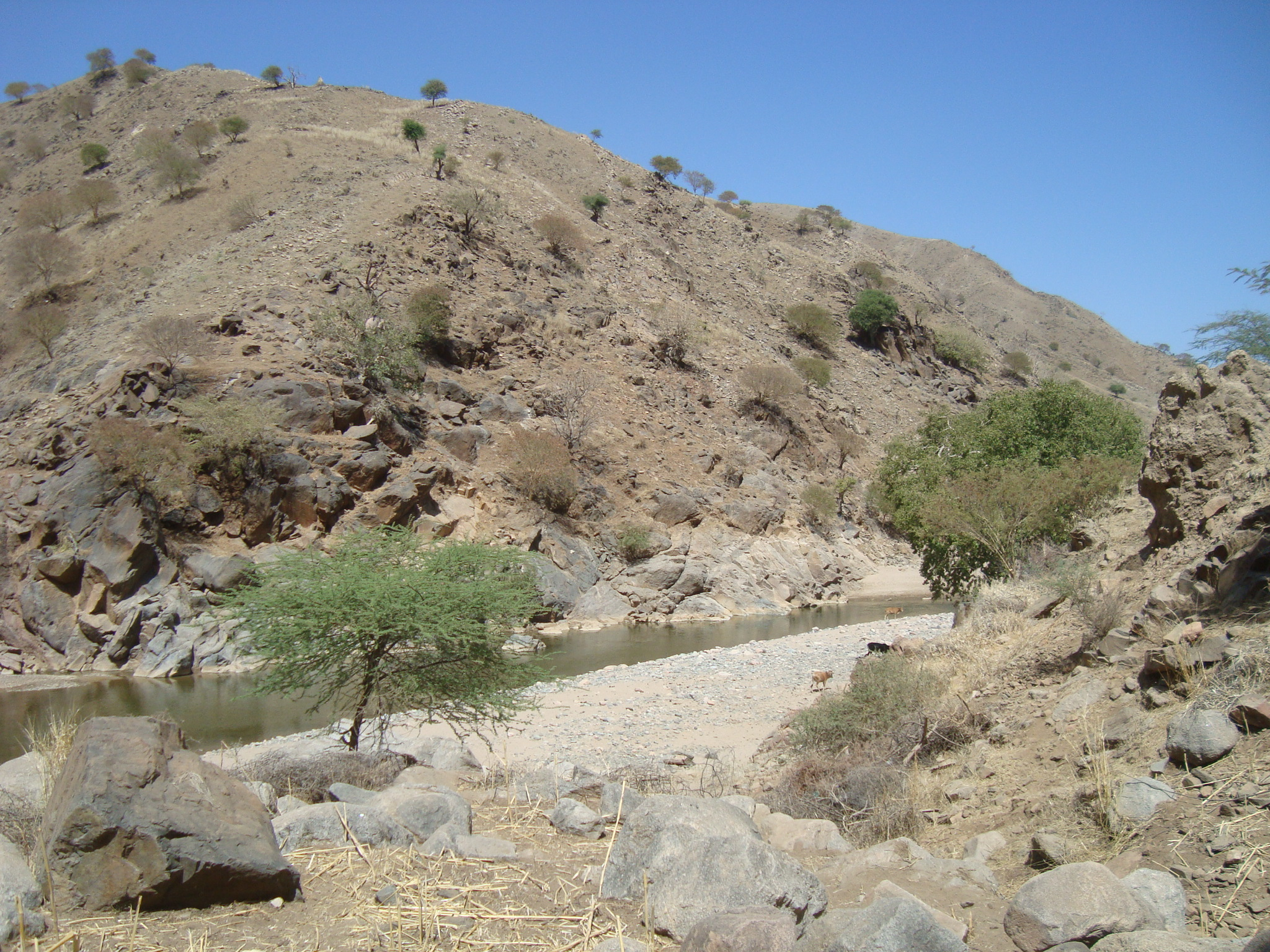
- Weri'i River at the border of Qola Tembien and Adet woredas

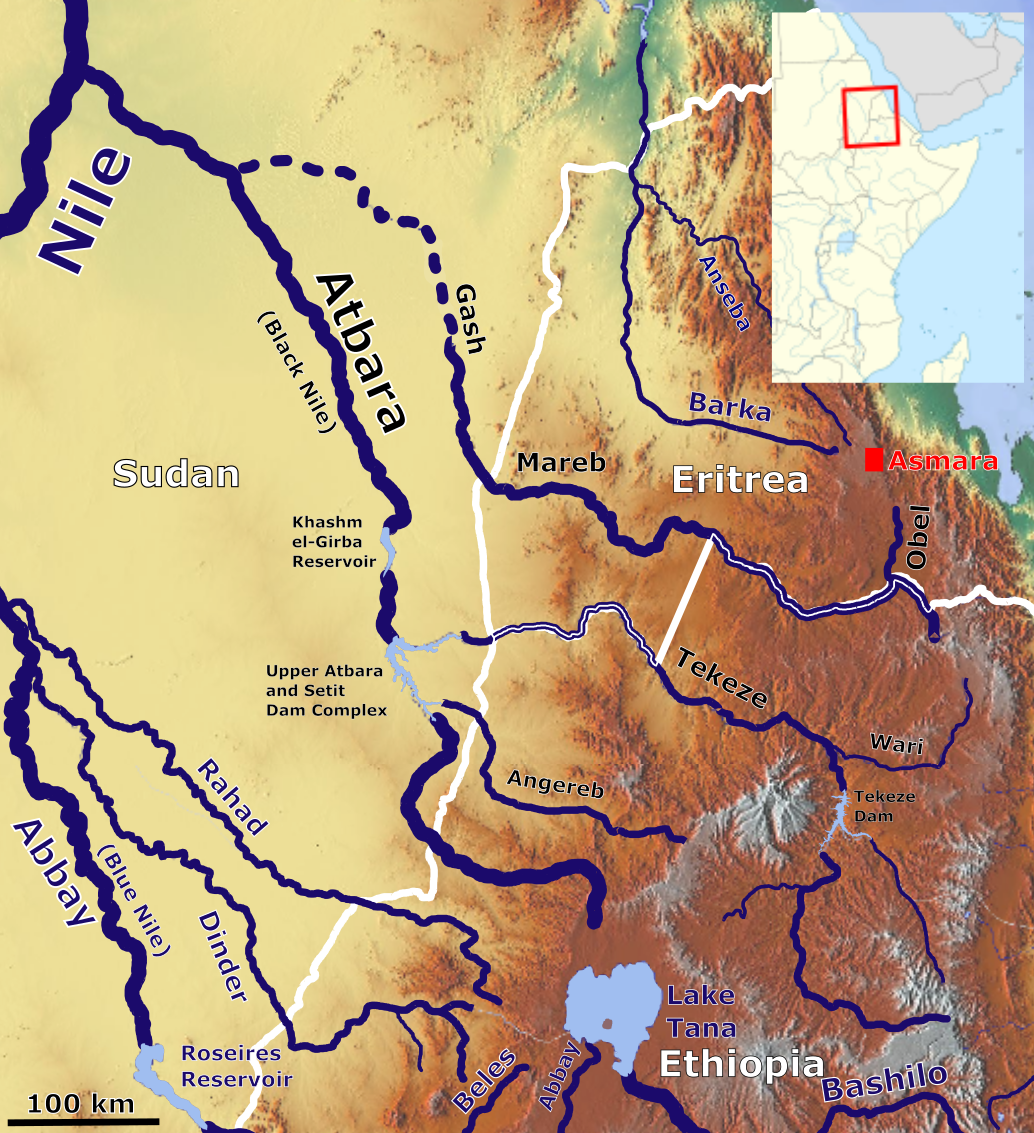
- Map showing the Atbara basin, with the Wari River (right)

Location
- Country: Ethiopia

Physical characteristics
- Mouth: Tekezé River

Basin features
- Progression: Tekezé→Atbarah→Nile→Mediterranean Sea

The Wari is a river of northern Ethiopia and a right tributary of the Tekezé River. It rises in the Gar'alta and flows to the southwest into the Tekezé at 13°41′N 38°33′E. Tributaries of the Wari include the Assam, Chemit, Meseuma, Tsedia, Agefet and Tsaliet rivers. The general drainage is westward, to the Tekezze River. Main tributaries in Dogu’a Tembien district are, from upstream to downstream

- Agefet River
  - Amblo River, in tabia Addi Walka
  - Azef River, at the border of tabias Addi Walka and Haddinnet
  - Ab'aro River, in tabia Haddinnet and woreda Kola Tembien
- May Leiba, in tabia Ayninbirkekin, which becomes Tinsehe R. in Selam and Mahbere Sillasie, and Tsaliet River, downstream from the Dabba Selama monastery
  - Khunale River, in tabia Selam
  - Harehuwa River, in tabia Mahbere Sillasie
  - Kidan Mihret River, in tabia Mahbere Sillasie
  - Ferrey River, at the border of tabias Mahbere Sillasie and Degol Woyane

== See also ==
- List of rivers of Ethiopia
