= Tsaliet =

River in the Tembien highlands of Ethiopia

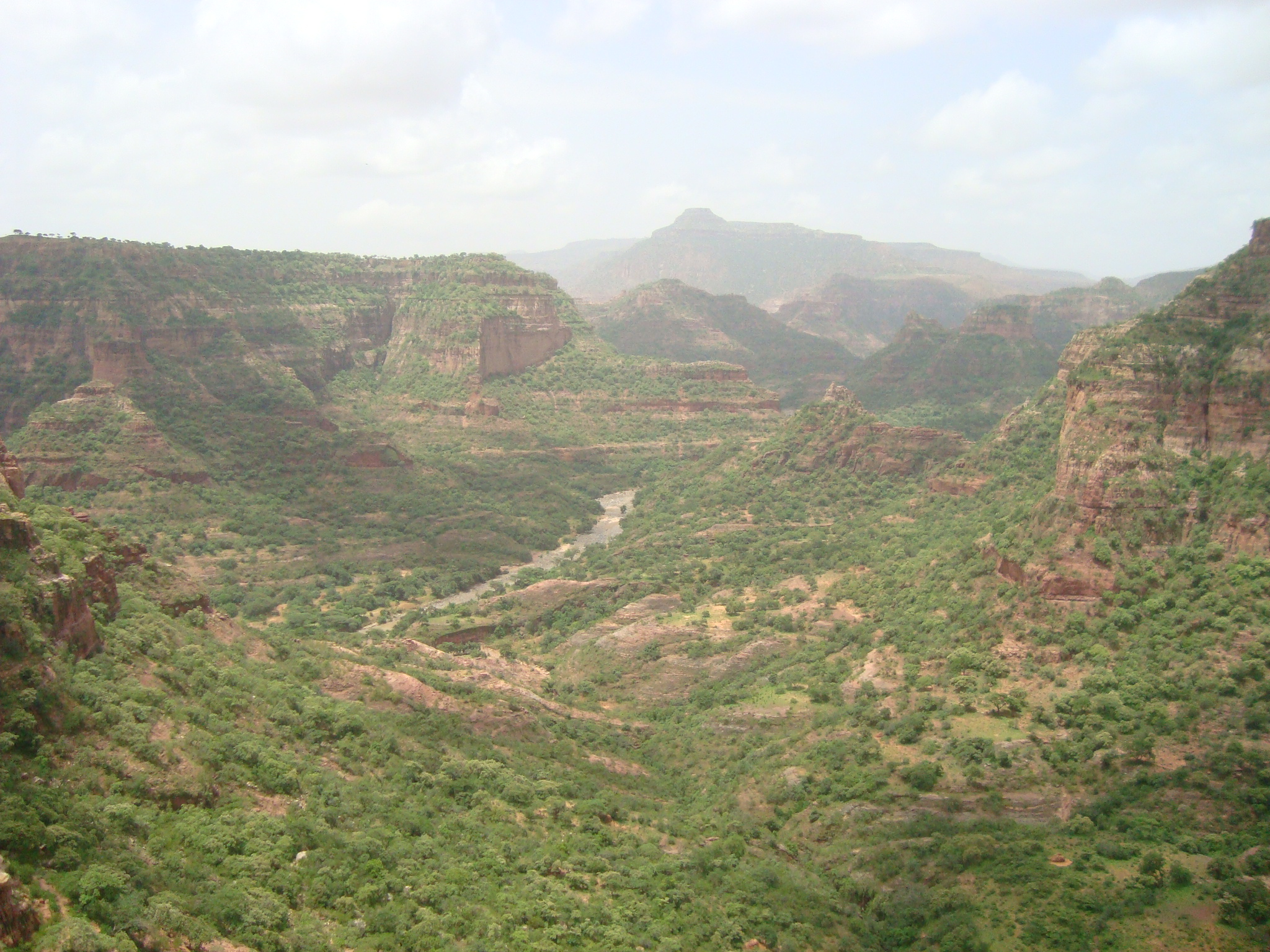
- The Tsaliet River near Dabba Selama monastery

- Tsaliet River in Tigray Region

Location
- Country: Ethiopia
- Region: Tigray Region

Physical characteristics
- Source: Tegula'i
  - location: Ayninbirkekin municipality
  - elevation: 2,512 m (8,241 ft)
- Mouth: Weri'i River
  - location: 10 km N of Werqamba
  - coordinates: 13.844°N 39.006°E
  - elevation: 1,380 m (4,530 ft)
- Length: 45 km (28 mi)
- Width
  - average: 50 m (160 ft)

Basin features
- Progression: Wari→ Tekezé→ Atbarah→ Nile→ Mediterranean Sea
- River system: Permanent river
- Landmarks: Dabba Selama monastery, Arebay mountain, Haddinnet ridge, Welegesa rock church
- Tributaries
  - left: Graliwdo, May Meqa, Kidane Mihret, Ferrey
  - right: Korowya, Agefet
- Waterbodies: May Leiba reservoir, Kolu Ba’alti pond
- Waterfalls: Tinsehe
- Bridges: Addeha (road Werqamba-Hawzien); Ruba Weyni (rural road)
- Topography: Mountains and deep gorges

The Tsaliet is a river in northern Ethiopia, belonging to the Nile basin. Rising in the mountains of Dogu’a Tembien, where it is first called May Leiba River and then Tinsehe River, it flows westward through a deep gorge, to become Tsaliet in its lower course, where it empties in Weri’i River, just upstream of the main Weri’i bridge along the road to Adwa.

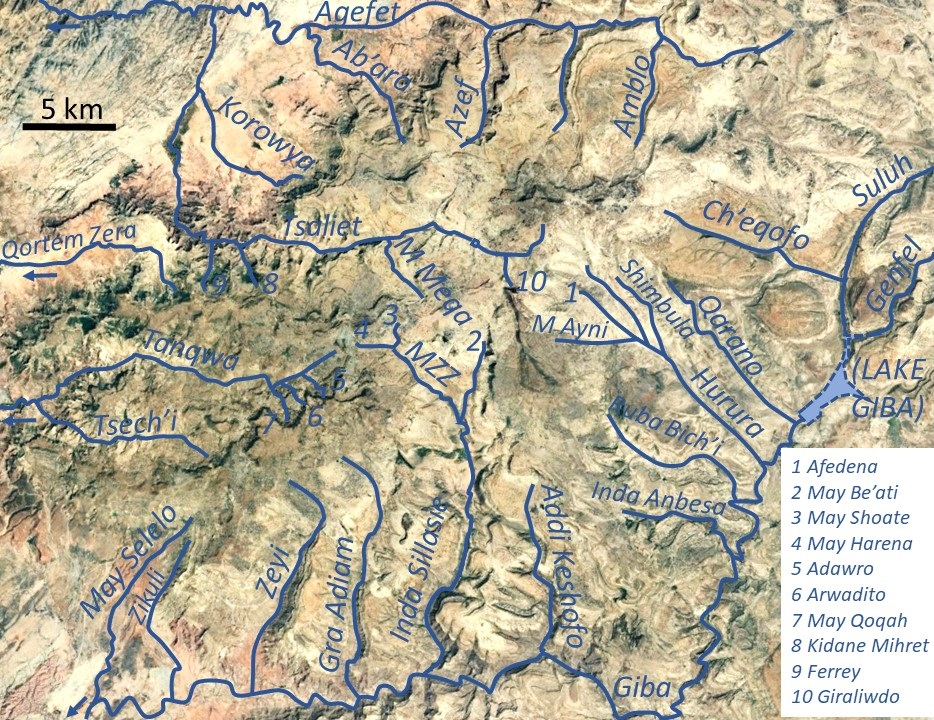
The river in the radial drainage network of Dogu’a Tembien

== Characteristics ==
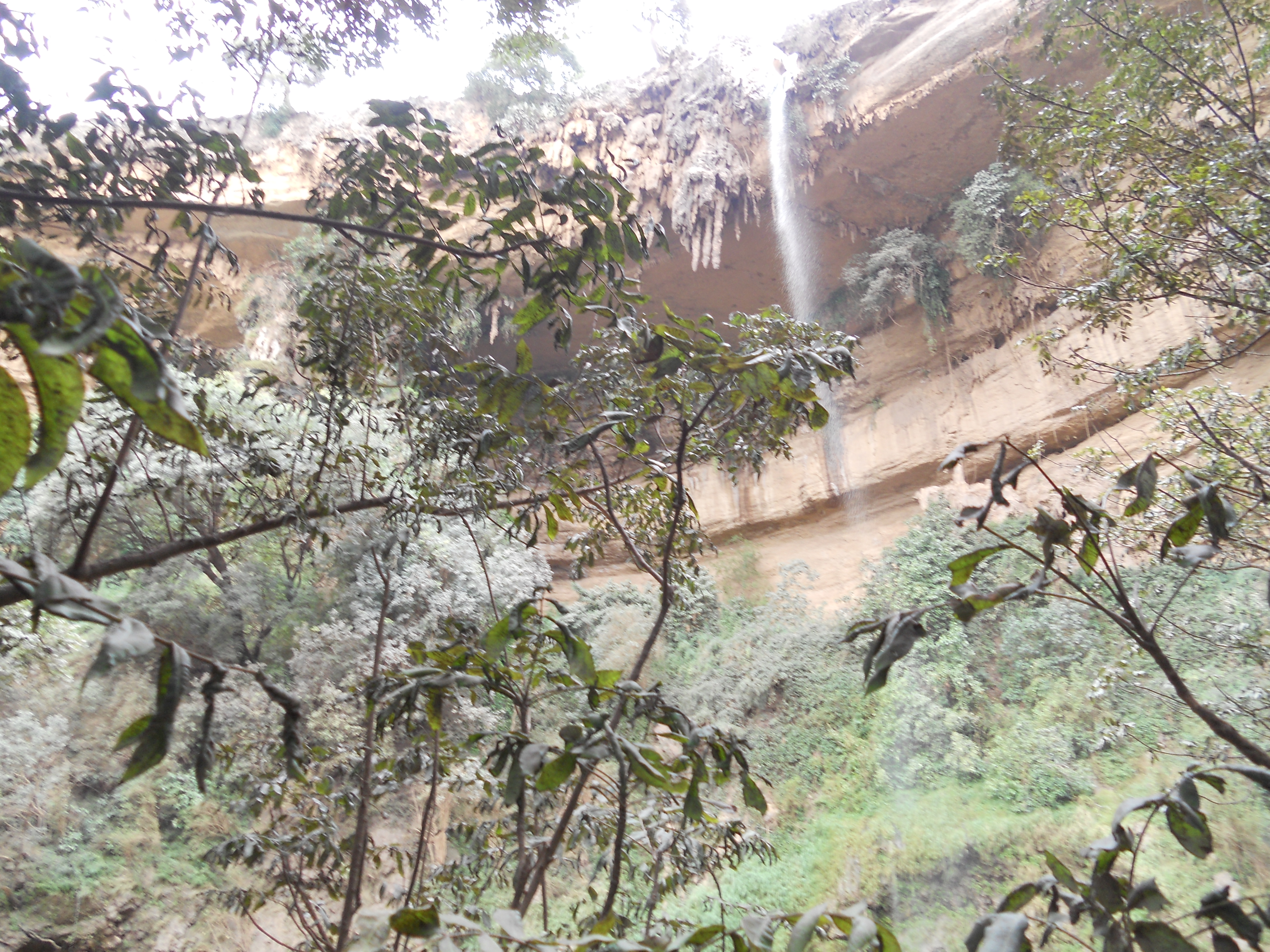
Waterfall in Tinsehe

It is mostly a confined river, locally meandering in its narrow alluvial plain, with an average slope gradient of 25 metres per kilometre. With its tributaries, the river has cut deep gorges. Along the middle of its course, it occupies sandy pediments in Addeha.

== Flash floods and flood buffering ==
Runoff mostly happens in the form of high runoff discharge events that occur in a very short period (called flash floods). These are related to the steep topography, often little vegetation cover and intense convective rainfall. The peaks of such flash floods have often a 50 to 100 times larger discharge than the preceding baseflow. The magnitude of floods in this river has however been decreased due to interventions in its upper catchment, particularly around the May Leiba reservoir. Physical conservation structures such as stone bunds and check dams intercept runoff. On many steep slopes, exclosures have been established; the dense vegetation largely contributes to enhanced infiltration, less flooding and better baseflow. Examples are the Khunale exclosure and the Harehuwa exclosure.

== Irrigated agriculture ==
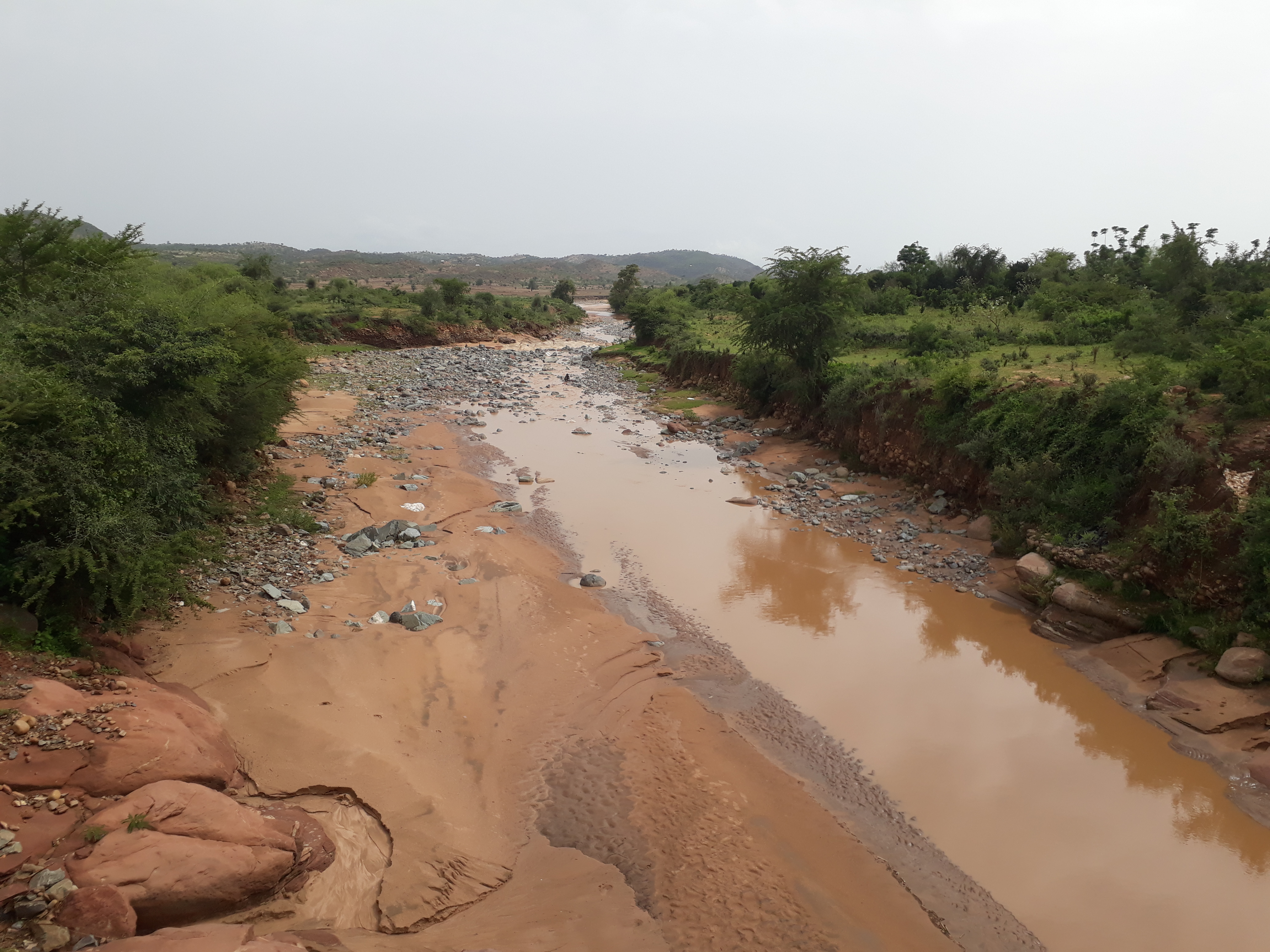
Tsaliet in Addeha's irrigation scheme

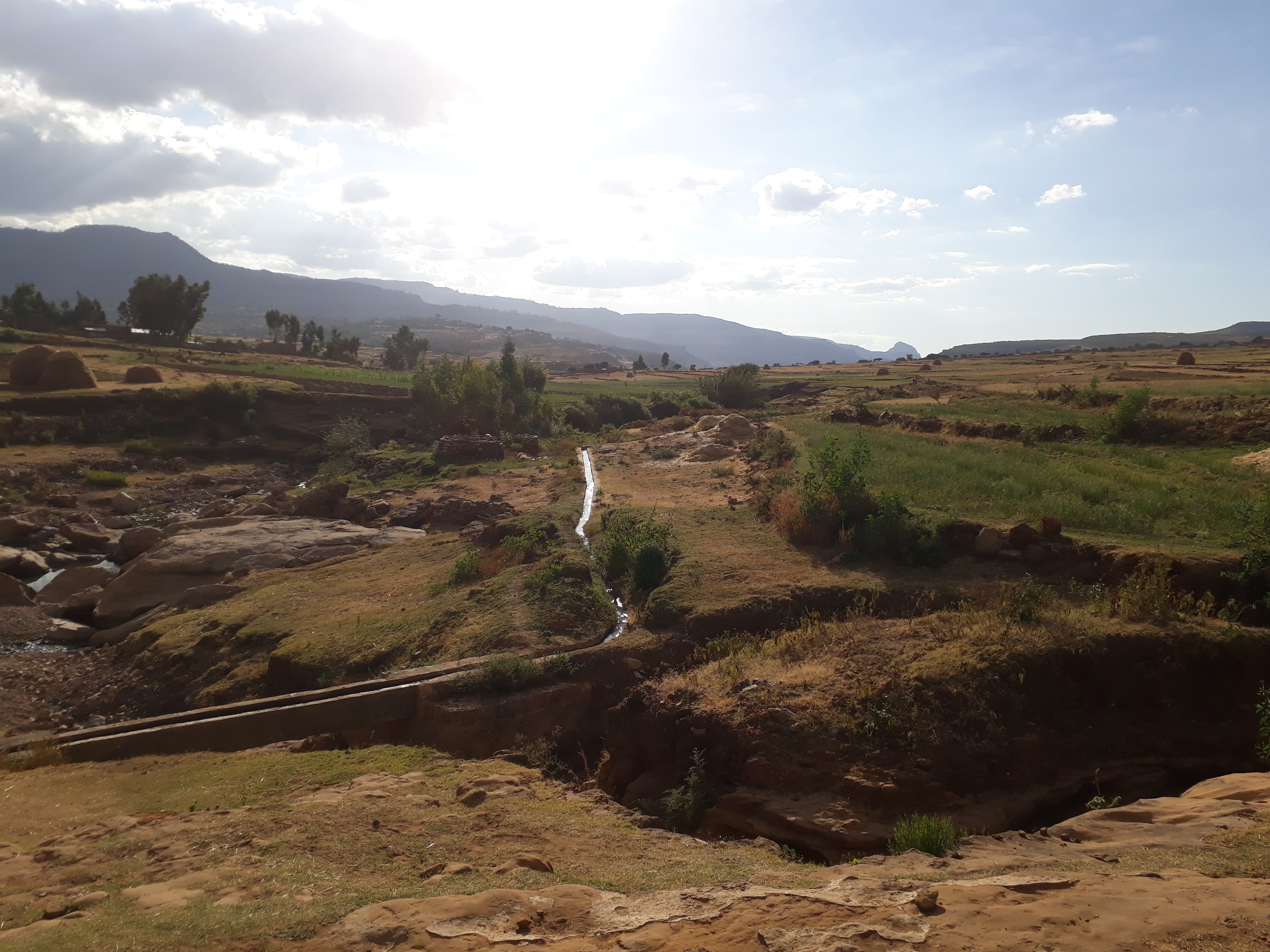
Ruba Weyni irrigation scheme

Besides springs and reservoirs, irrigation is strongly dependent on the river's baseflow. Such irrigated agriculture is important in meeting the demands for food security and poverty reduction. Irrigated lands are established in the narrow alluvial plains along the river in:

- large lowland irrigation schemes with tropical fruits in Addeha
- spring-based irrigation in Ruba Weyni

== Transhumance towards the gorge ==
The valley bottoms in the gorges of this river have been identified as transhumance destination zones. Transhumance takes place in the summer rainy season, when the lands near the villages are occupied by crops. Young shepherds will take the village cattle down to the gorge and overnight in small caves. The gorges are particularly attractive as a transhumance destination zone, because there is water and good growth of semi-natural vegetation.

== Geology ==
=== Tsaliet Group ===
The Tsaliet Group, an older sequence of metamorphic rock is named after the Tsaliet River. Based on crystallisation ages of its rocks in Eritrea and Ethiopia, it is estimated that the igneous activity occurred between ~850 and 740 million years ago. The Tsaliet Group has recorded the arc volcanism and the formation of crust that later formed part of the Arabian-Nubian Shield. The Group consists of partially metamorphosed volcanic and sedimentary rocks (impure marble, slate, calcareous siltstone, sericite-chlorite schist, greywacke, and tuff), with a minimum thickness between 1500 and 2500 metres.

=== Boulders and pebbles in the river bed ===
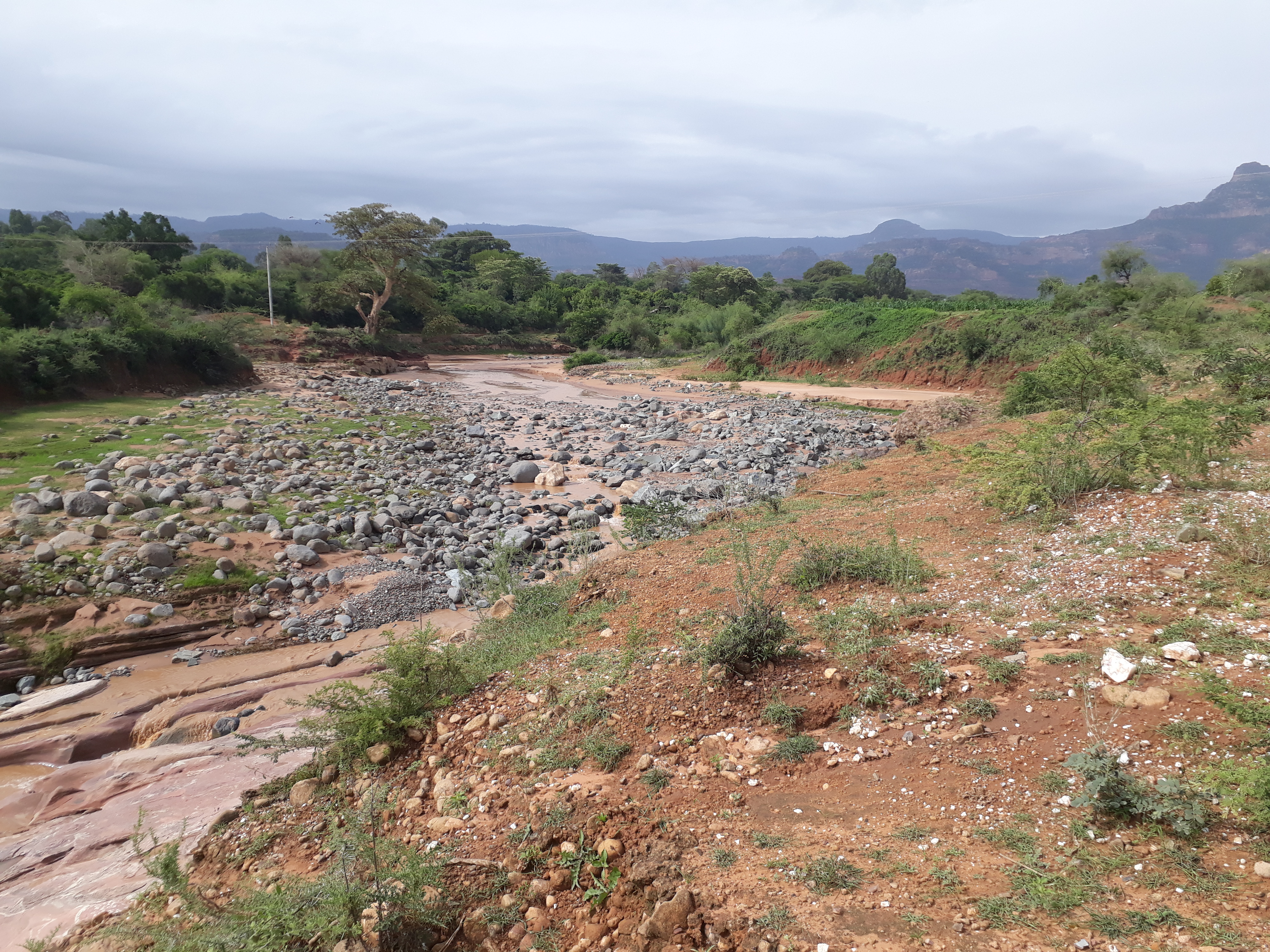
Tsaliet River near Addeha

From upstream to downstream, the following lithological units occur in the catchment.

- Phonolite plugs
- Upper basalt
- Interbedded lacustrine deposits
- Lower basalt
- Amba Aradam Formation

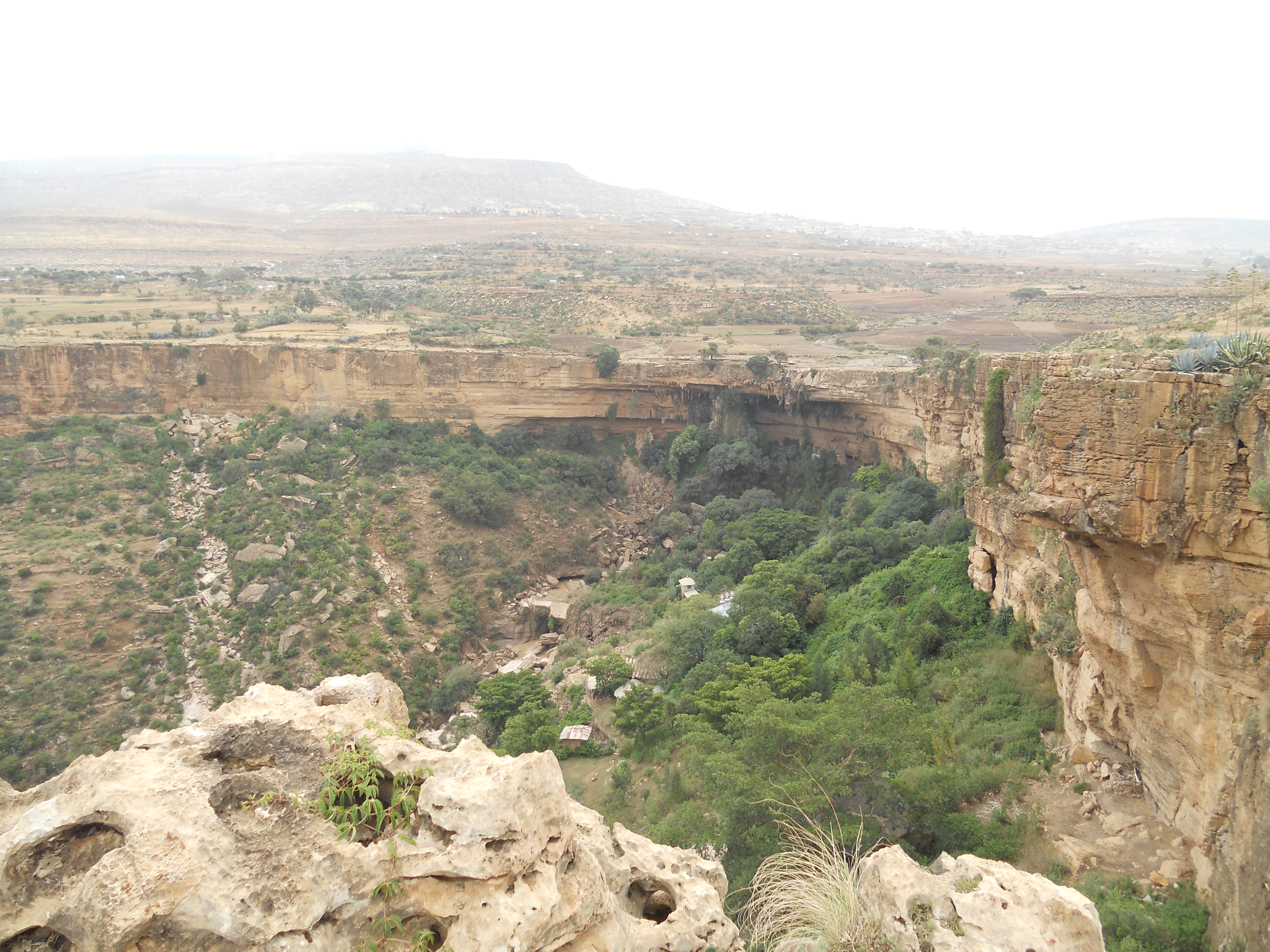
The 100-m high waterfall in Tinsehe, over a hard Antalo Limestone bank

- Antalo Limestone
- Quaternary freshwater tufa
- Adigrat Sandstone
- Edaga Arbi Glacials
- Tsaliet metamorphic rock

Logically, in the uppermost stretches of the river, only the pebbles and boulders of the upper lithological units will be present in the river bed, whereas more downstream one may find a more comprehensive mix of all lithologies crossed by the river.

== Natural boundary ==
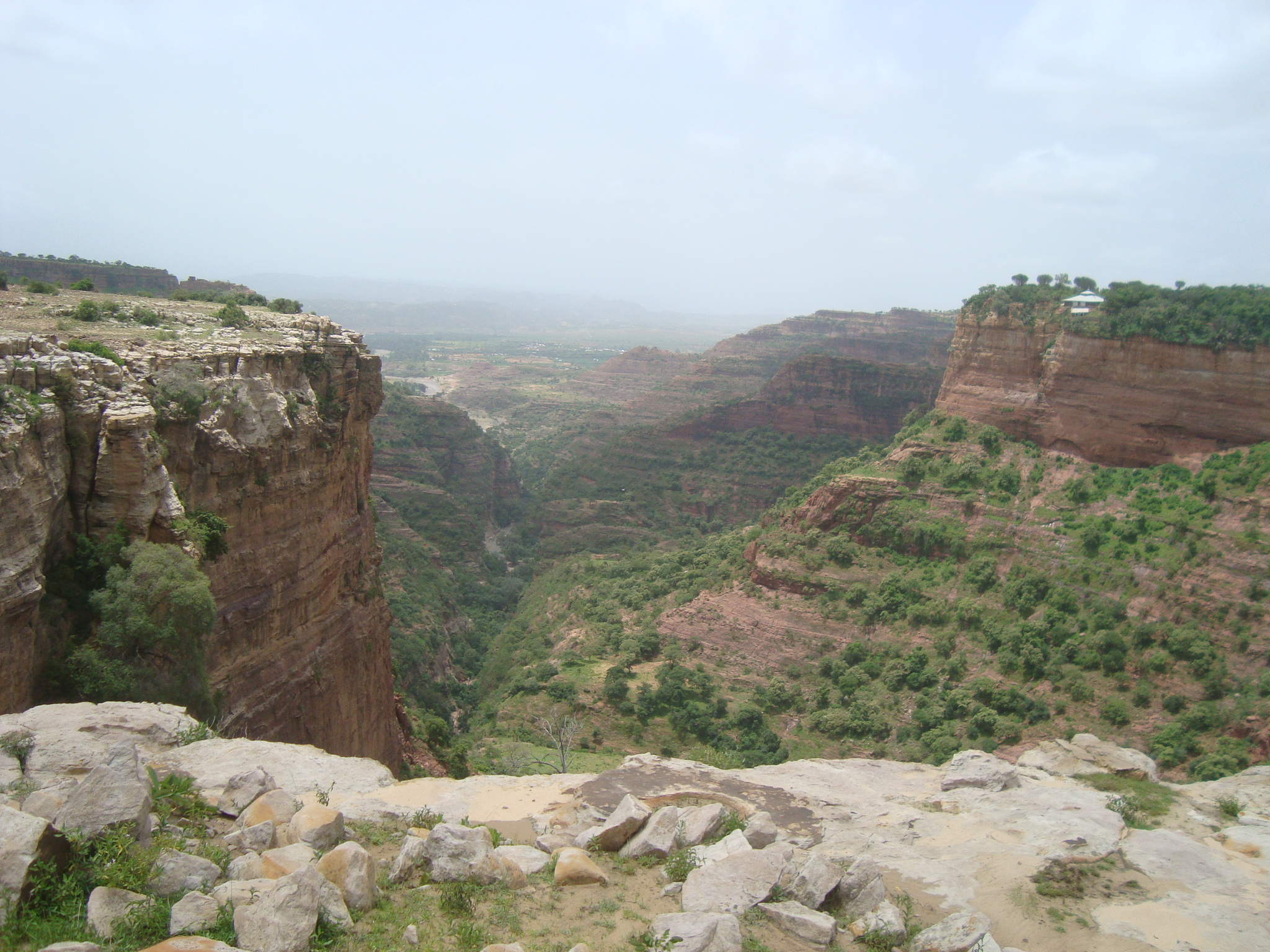
Tsaliet down from Dabba Selama

During its course, this river passes through two woredas and constitutes their boundary over some six kilometres. On the various parts:

- Dogu’a Tembien to the southeast
- Kola Tembien to the northwest

== Trekking along the river ==
Trekking routes have been established across and along this river. The tracks are not marked on the ground but can be followed using downloaded .GPX files.

- Trek 3 follows the river course
- Trek 21 runs at half height on the flanks of the Tsaliet gorge in Haddinnet
- Treks 23 and 26 round the upper catchment

In the rainy season, flash floods may occur and it is advised not to follow the river bed. At times it may be impossible to cross the river in the rainy season.

== See also ==
- List of Ethiopian rivers
