= Degol Woyane =

Municipality in Tigray Region, Ethiopia

Degol Woyane Dabba Salama
- Municipality
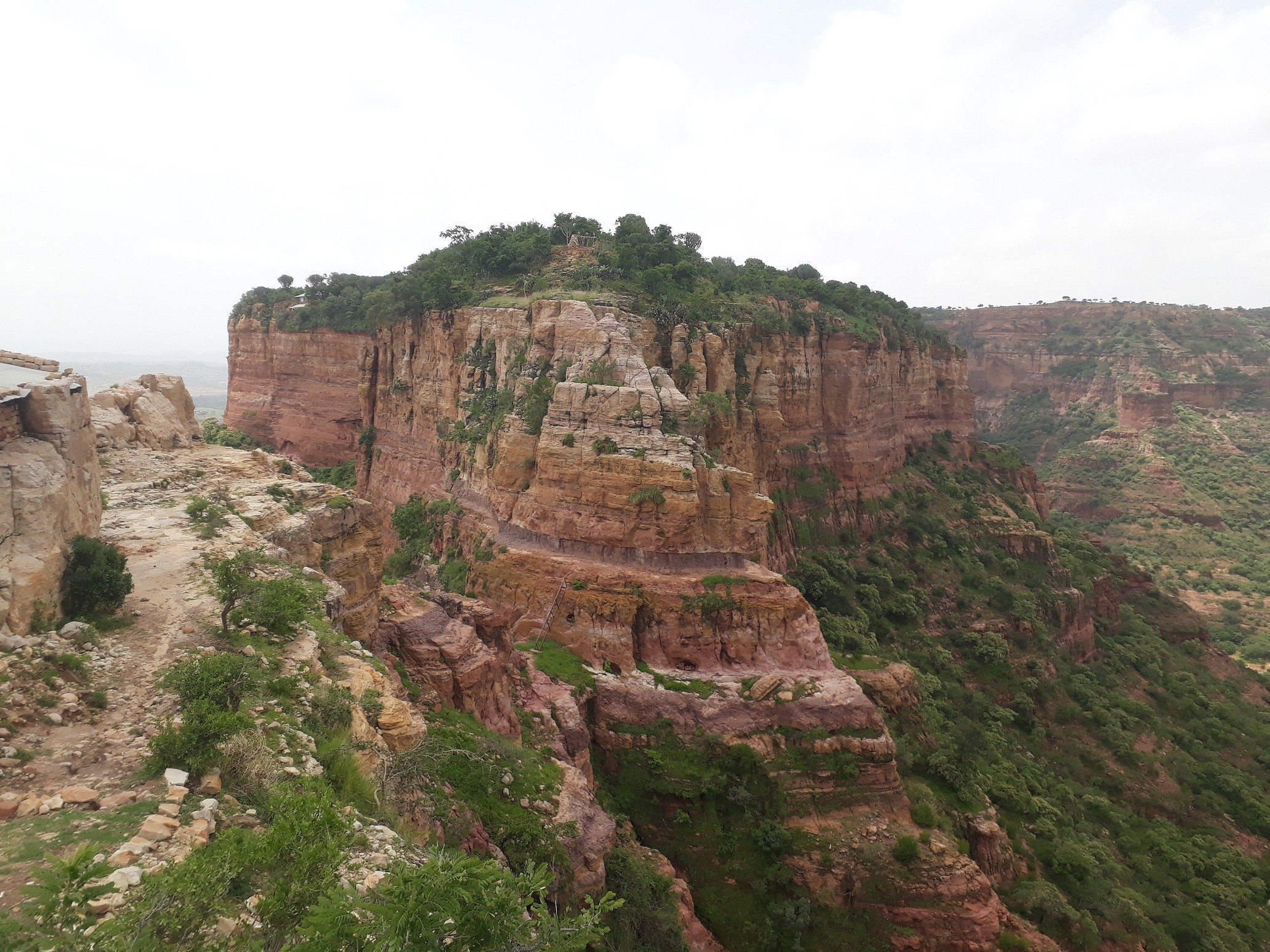
- Dabba Selama monastery on a small mesa in Adigrat Sandstone

- Location within Ethiopia
- Coordinates: 13°40′N 39°6′E
- Country: Ethiopia
- Region: Tigray
- Zone: Debub Misraqawi (Southeastern)
- Woreda: Dogu'a Tembien

Area
  - Total: 29.19 km^{2} (11.27 sq mi)
- Elevation: 2,500 m (8,200 ft)
- Time zone: UTC+3 (EAT)

Degol Woyane is a tabia or municipality in the Dogu'a Tembien district of the Tigray Region of Ethiopia. It includes Dabba Selama, the oldest monastery of Ethiopia, and the most inaccessible in the world. The tabia centre is in Zala village, located approximately 10 km to the west of the woreda town Hagere Selam.

== Geography ==
The tabia stretches down west of Melfa, along the westernmost ridge of Dogu'a Tembien. The highest peak is T'afa (2580 m a.s.l.) and the lowest place Addi Welo (1990 m a.s.l.).

=== Geology ===
From the higher to the lower locations, the following geological formations are present:

- Lower basalt
- Amba Aradam Formation
- Adigrat Sandstone

=== Springs ===
As there are no permanent rivers, the presence of springs is of utmost importance for the local people. The following are the springs in the tabia:

- May Dara in Zala
- Addi Welo

=== Livelihood ===
The population lives essentially from crop farming, supplemented with off-season work in nearby towns. The land is dominated by farmlands which are clearly demarcated and are cropped every year. Hence the agricultural system is a permanent upland farming system.

=== Population ===
The tabia centre Zala holds a few administrative offices and some small shops. The main other populated places in the tabia are:

- Gimsa
- T'afa
- May Baha
- Ferrey

- Dabba Selama
- Addi Welo
- May Idaga

=== Religion and rock churches ===
Most inhabitants are Orthodox Christians. The following rock churches are located in the tabia:

The almost inaccessible Dabba Selama monastery (13°41.67′N 39°6.03′E) is assumed to be the first monastery established in Ethiopia, by Saint Frumentius. The intrepid visitor will climb down, then scramble over narrow ledges along precipices, and finally climb an overhanging cliff. The mesa also comprises a church hewn in Adigrat Sandstone, in shape of a small basilica. The carvers attempted to establish four bays as well as with a recess. The pillars are rounded (which is uncommon) and expand at either end, supporting arches that appear as triangles. Women are not allowed to do the ascent, nor to visit monastery or church. Independently from the difficult access to the monastery, the surrounding sandstone geomorphology is unique.

The Amani'el church in May Baha (13°40′N 39°5.4′E) has also been carved in Adigrat Sandstone. Behind a pronaos (1960s), the rock church has cruciform columns, flat beams and a flat ceiling, a single arch, and a flat rear wall without apse. Windows give light to the church itself. Emperor Yohannes IV was baptised in this church.

== History ==
The history of the tabia is strongly confounded with the history of Tembien.

== Schools ==
Almost all children of the tabia are schooled, though in some schools there is lack of classrooms, directly related to the large intake in primary schools over the last decades. Schools in the tabia include Atse Yohannes school in Zala.

== Roads and communication ==
A rural access road links Zala to the main asphalt road in Hagere Selam. It is also connected through a disused road to Werkamba in the West.

== Tourism ==
Its mountainous nature, monastery and rock church make the tabia fit for tourism.

=== Touristic attractions ===
- Daba Selama monastery
- May Baha rock church
- Grand-canyon-like landscapes

=== Geotouristic sites ===
The high variability of geological formations and the rugged topography invites for geological and geographic tourism or "geotourism". Geosites in the tabia include:

- Grand-canyon-like landscapes
- May Mirara Forest
- Chege Forest

- Ferrey resurgence and tropical gardens
- Tsaliet gorge

=== Birdwatching ===
Birdwatching (for the species, see the main Dogu'a Tembien page) can be done particularly in exclosures and forests. The following bird-watching sites have been inventoried in the tabia and mapped.

- Zala slope forest
- May Baha church forest
- May Mirara forest

=== Trekking routes ===
Trekking routes have been established in this tabia. The tracks are not marked on the ground but can be followed using downloaded .GPX files.

- Route 4, from Hagere Selam, through Ferrey and Dabba Selama to Kola Tembien
- Route 5, from Hagere Selam, through May Baha to Kola Tembien
- Route 25, from Zala, along the ridge through Geramba to Kola Tembien

All treks require good physical condition and will take (at least) a full day.

=== Inda Siwa, the local beer houses ===
In the main villages, there are traditional beer houses (Inda Siwa), often in unique settings, which are a good place for resting and chatting with the local people. Most renown in the tabia are

- Tinsue Brhane at Zala
- Letebrhan Gerese'a at Zala

=== Accommodation and facilities ===
The facilities are very basic. One may be invited to spend the night in a rural homestead or ask permission to pitch a tent. Hotels are available in Hagere Selam, Werqamba, Abiy Addi and Mekelle.

== More detailed information ==
For more details on environment, agriculture, rural sociology, hydrology, ecology, culture, etc., see the overall page on the Dogu'a Tembien district.

== Gallery ==
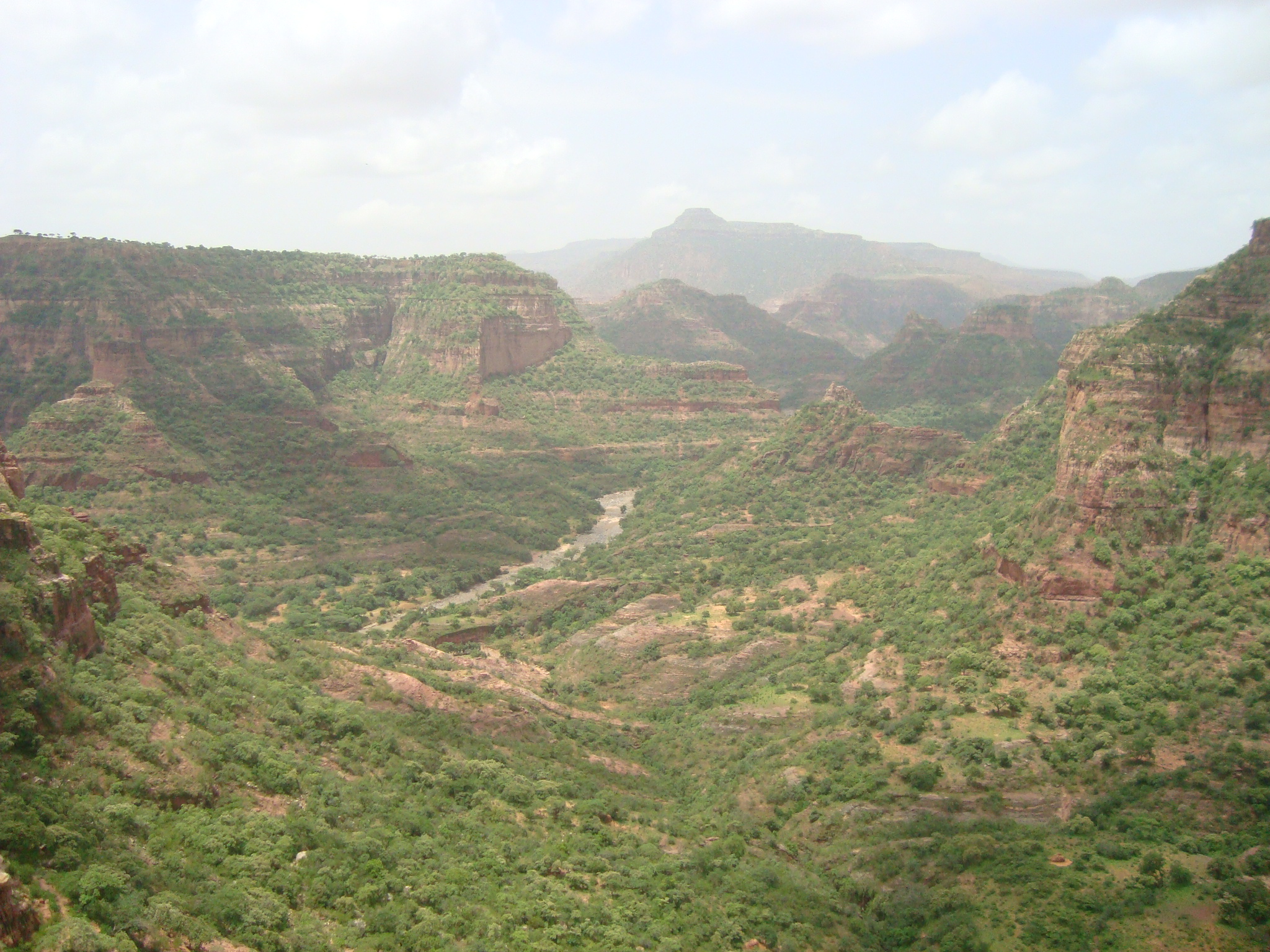
Gorge of Tsaliet River, near Dabba Selama monastery.

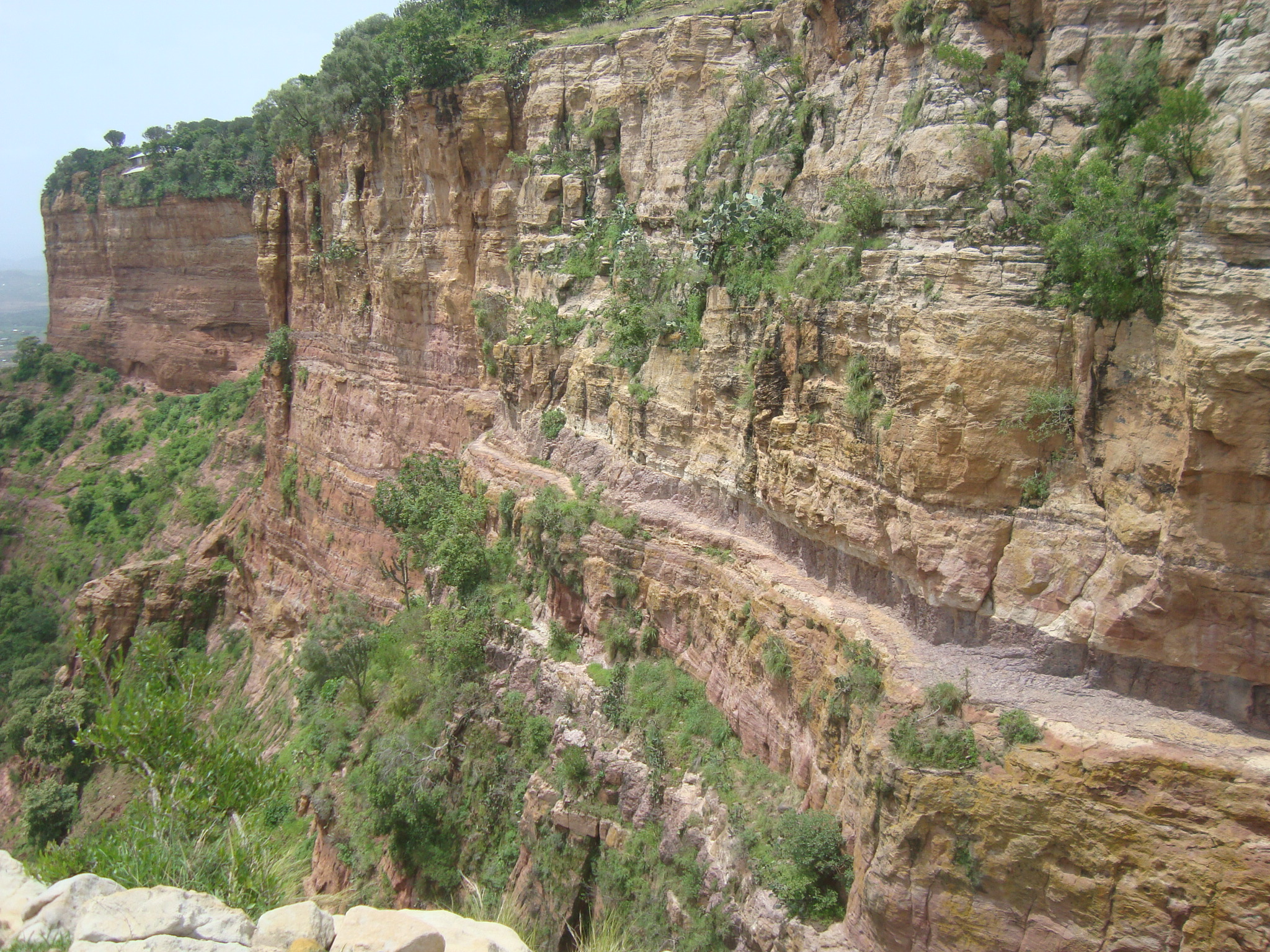
Accessing Daba Selama monastery requires a perillous climb.

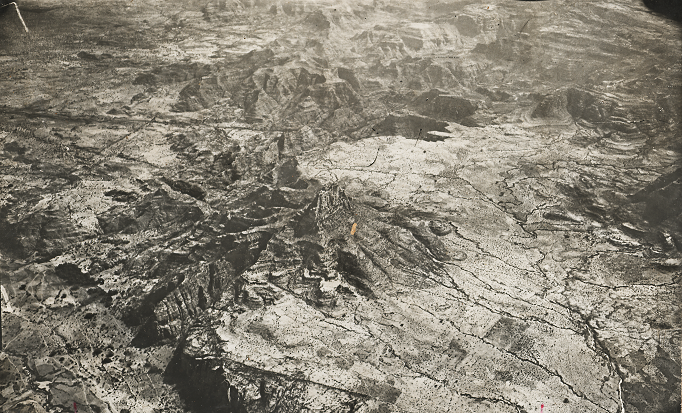
The May Baha and Dabba Selama area, as seen from an Italian spy flight in 1936.
