= Kola Tembien =

District in Tigray Region, Ethiopia

Kola Tembien ቆላ ተምቤን
- Woreda

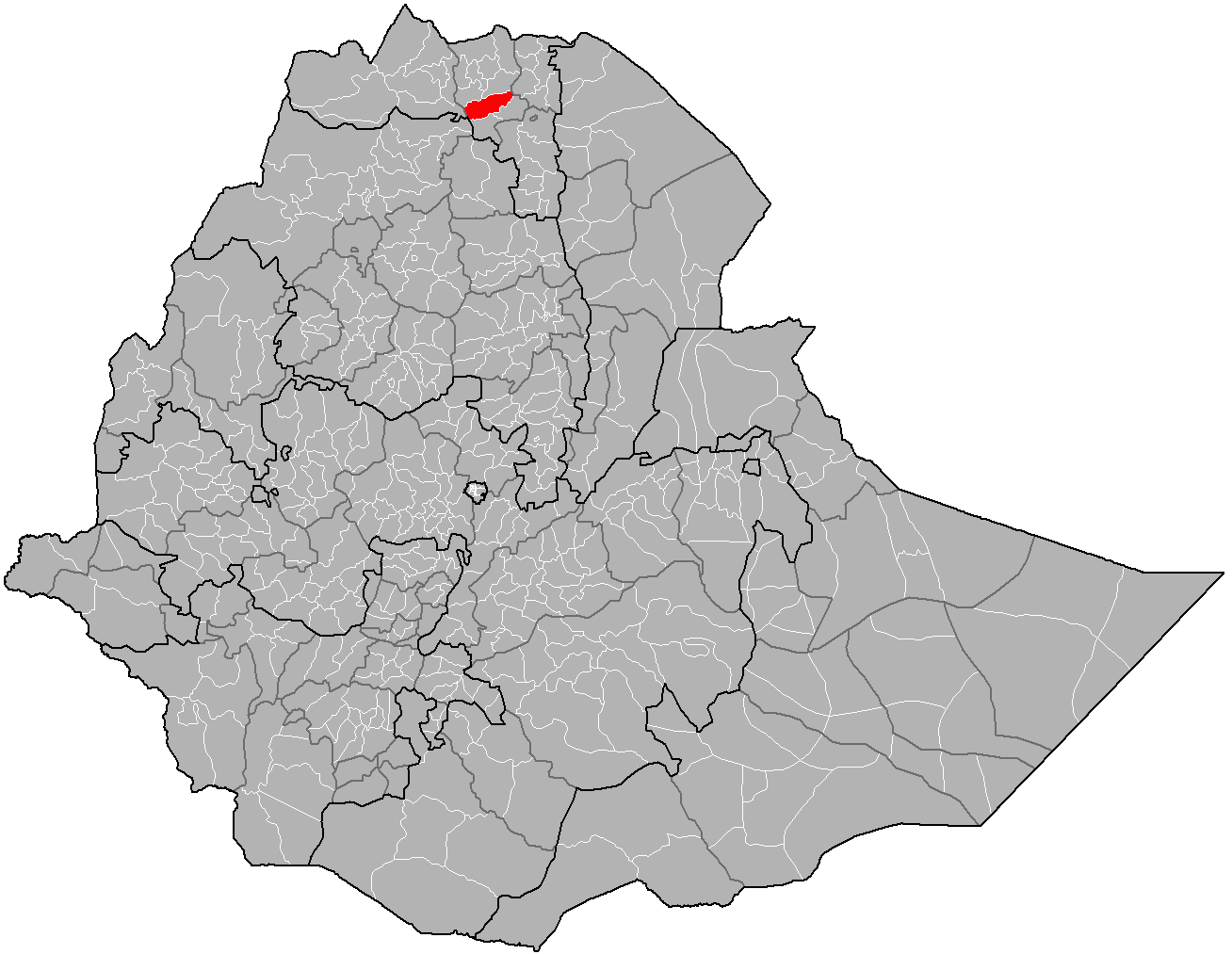
- Country: Ethiopia
- Region: Tigray
- Zone: Maekelay (Central)

Area
  - Total: 2,538.39 km^{2} (980.08 sq mi)

Population (2007)
  - Total: 134,336

Kola Tembien (Tigrinya: ቆላ ተምቤን, "Lower Tembien") is a woreda in Tigray Region, Ethiopia. It is named in part after the former province of Tembien. Part of the Mehakelegnaw Zone, Kola Tembien is bordered on the south by Abergele, on the west by the Tekezé River which separates it from the Semien Mi'irabawi (North Western) Zone, on the north by the Wari River which separates it from Naeder Adet and Werie Lehe, on the east by Misraqawi (Eastern) Zone, and on the southeast by Degua Tembien. Towns in Kola Tembien include Guya and Werkamba. The town of Abiy Addi is surrounded by Kola Tembien.

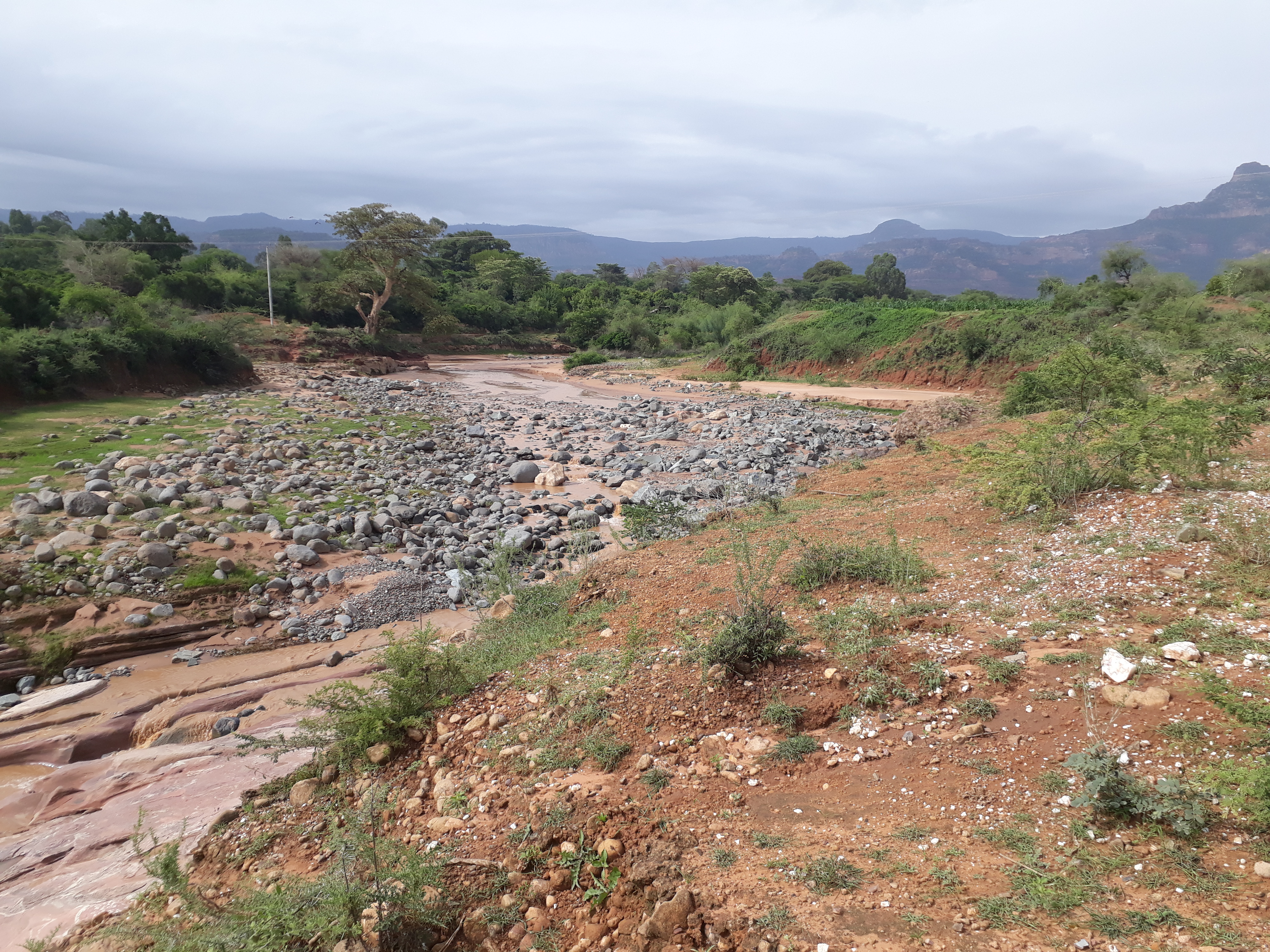
The Tsaliet River (near Addeha), a tributary to Weri'i River

== Demographics ==
Based on the 2007 national census conducted by the Central Statistical Agency of Ethiopia (CSA), this woreda has a total population of 134,336, an increase of 28.13% over the 1994 census, of whom 66,925 are men and 67,411 women; 0 or 0.00% are urban inhabitants. With an area of 2,538.39 square kilometers, Kola Tembien has a population density of 52.92, which is 56.29 than the Zone average of 0 persons per square kilometer. A total of greater households were counted in this woreda, resulting in an average of 8,871 persons to a household, and 28,917 housing units. The majority of the inhabitants said they practiced Ethiopian Orthodox Christianity, with 99.86% reporting that as their religion.

The 1994 national census reported a total population for this woreda of 113,712, of whom 56,453 were men and 57,259 were women; 8,871 or 7.8% of its population were urban dwellers. The largest ethnic group reported in Kola Tembien was the Tigrayan (99.88%). Tigrinya was spoken as a first language by 99.82%. 98.23% of the population practiced Ethiopian Orthodox Christianity, and 1.69% were Muslim. Concerning education, 9.15% of the population were considered literate, which is less than the Zone average of 14.21%; 8.64% of children aged 7–12 were in primary school; 0.72% of the children aged 13–14 were in junior secondary school, and 0.86% of the inhabitants aged 15–18 were in senior secondary school. Concerning sanitary conditions, about 86% of the urban houses and 17% of all houses had access to safe drinking water at the time of the census; 11% of the urban and 3% of the total had toilet facilities.

== History ==
See: History of Tembien

== Rock churches ==
Like several other districts in Tigray, Kola Tembien holds its share of rock-hewn or monolithic churches. These have literally been hewn from rock, mostly before the 10th C. CE.

Notable landmarks in this woreda include the monastery of Abba Yohanni and the monolithic church of Gebriel Wukien, both of which are north of Abiy Addi.

Six rock-hewn churches are established along the slopes of the Degua Tembien massif.

The Mika’el Samba (13°42.56′N 39°6.81′E) rock church is completely rock hewn in Adigrat Sandstone. There are a series of grave cells leading off the main space. As this is not a village church, people come here only rarely, and it is locked most of the time. Priests are present particularly on Mika’els day, the twelfth day of every month in the Ethiopian calendar.

The Maryam Hibeto rock church (13°42.67′N 39°6.44′E), located inconspicuously at the edge of the church forest and cemetery, is also completely hewn in Adigrat Sandstone, with an arched pronaos in front of it. The exterior of the colonnade column has a double capital. The ceiling is carved, and on either side are two elongated chambers which could have been the beginnings of an ambulatory, or else were living quarters. The main entrance to the church is at a lower level, down a number of steps and immediately on entering, a rectangular pool of water fed by a spring to the right. The floor is not level and the columns are stumpy with the springing coming halfway up the columns and oddly cut capitals.

The Welegesa church (13°43′N 39°4′E) is hewn in Adigrat Sandstone. The entrance to the church buildings is in reality part of the rock forming two enclosures or courtyards, both hewn and open to the air. In the first courtyard there are a number of graves, and between the two, a block of stone with a cross in the window opening in the centre. The church proper, three-aisled, four bays in depth, is entered from either side through hewn passageways. The church ceiling is the same height throughout, with capitals, arches and cupolas to each bay, with a hewn tabot in the apse. The plan is sophisticated, with a central axis running north-south and the two open courtyards cut deep into the rock.

The newly hewn Medhanie Alem rock church in Mt. Werqamba (13°42.86′N 39°00.27′E) is in a central, smaller peak (in Adigrat Sandstone).

High in the mountains northwest of Abiy Addi, the Geramba rock church (13°38.84′N 39°1.55′E) is hewn in the top of a butte of Tertiary silicified limestone, under a thin cover of basalt. The columns are rather crudely carved, although slightly cruciform in plan and with bracket capitals much modified before the springing of the rough arches.

Itsiwto Maryam rock church (13°40′N 39°1′E) is completely hewn in Adigrat Sandstone. The small church has an unusual continuous hipped ceiling to the centre aisle with carved diagonal crosses to the last section and a cross carved above the arch into the sanctuary. The ceiling is flat to the side aisles with longitudinal flat beams running lengthwise into the church, projecting and forming a continuous lintel – very similar to workmanship following the Tigrayan tradition. Access to the church is not permitted because of risk of collapse.

Further up, in the Degua Tembien mountains at the east, there are an additional eight rock churches and natural caves with a church at its entrance.

== Agriculture ==
A sample enumeration performed by the CSA in 2001 interviewed 27,665 farmers in this woreda, who held an average of 0.81 hectares of land. Of the 22,402 hectares of private land surveyed, 85.28% was in cultivation, 0.87% pasture, 10.78% fallow, 0.23% woodland, and 2.84% was devoted to other uses. For the land under cultivation in this woreda, 78.02% was planted in cereals, 4.61% in pulses, 1.82% in oilseeds, and 0.08% in vegetables. The area planted in gesho was 36 hectares; the amount of land planted in fruit trees is missing. 77.26% of the farmers both raised crops and livestock, while 19.75% only grew crops and 2.98% only raised livestock. Land tenure in this woreda is distributed amongst 89.01% owning their land, and 10.48% renting; the percentage reported as holding their land under other forms of tenure is missing.

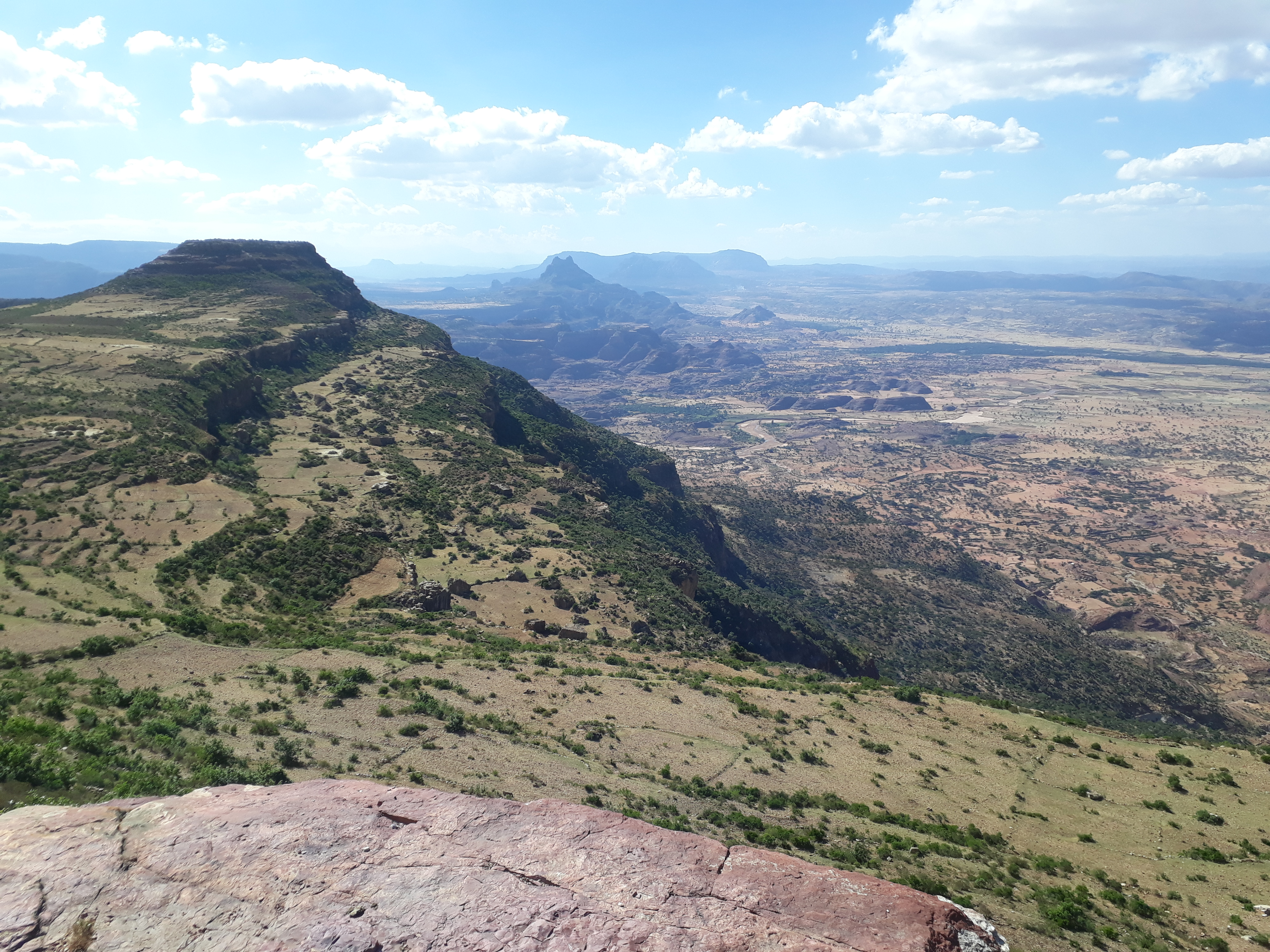
Kayeh Tehli as seen from Tsili ridge

== Geomorphology ==
Kola Tembien is one of the few places in the Ethiopian highlands where wind erosion occurs. Dunes are locally formed in places with wind shade.

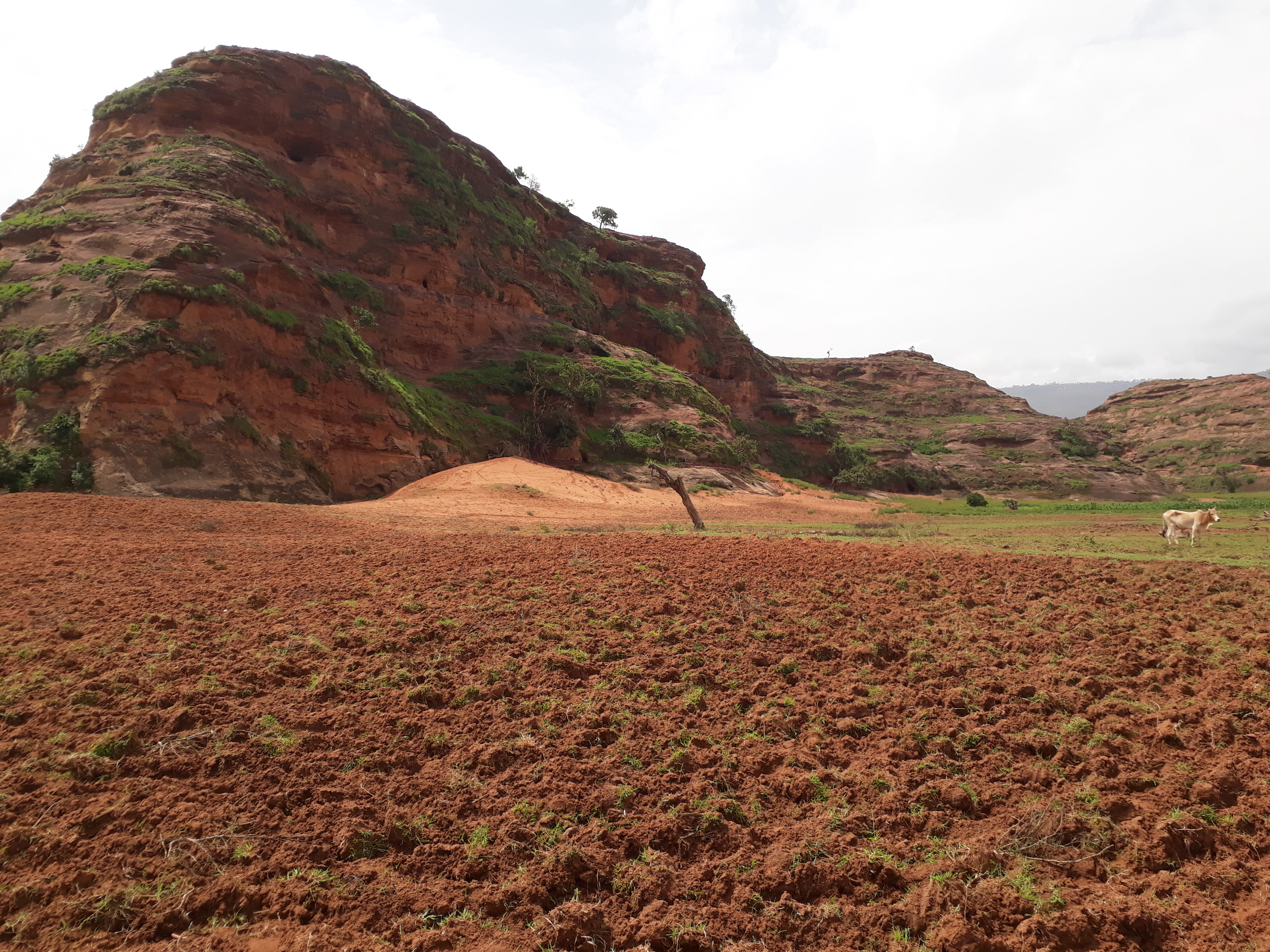
Aeolian deposition near Addeha

== Reservoirs ==
In this district with rains that last only for a couple of months per year, reservoirs of different sizes allow harvesting runoff from the rainy season for further use in the dry season. The reservoirs of the district include Addi Asme'e. Overall, these reservoirs suffer from rapid siltation. Part of the water that could be used for irrigation is lost through seepage; the positive side-effect is that this contributes to groundwater recharge.

== 2020 woreda reorganisation ==
As of 2020, woreda Kolla Tembien's territory belongs to the following new woredas:

- Kolla Tembien (new, smaller, woreda west of Abiy Addi)
- Kayeh Tehli woreda (northeast of Abiy Addi, with towns Workamba and Addeha)
- Abiy Addi town
