= Addilal =

Municipality in Ethiopia

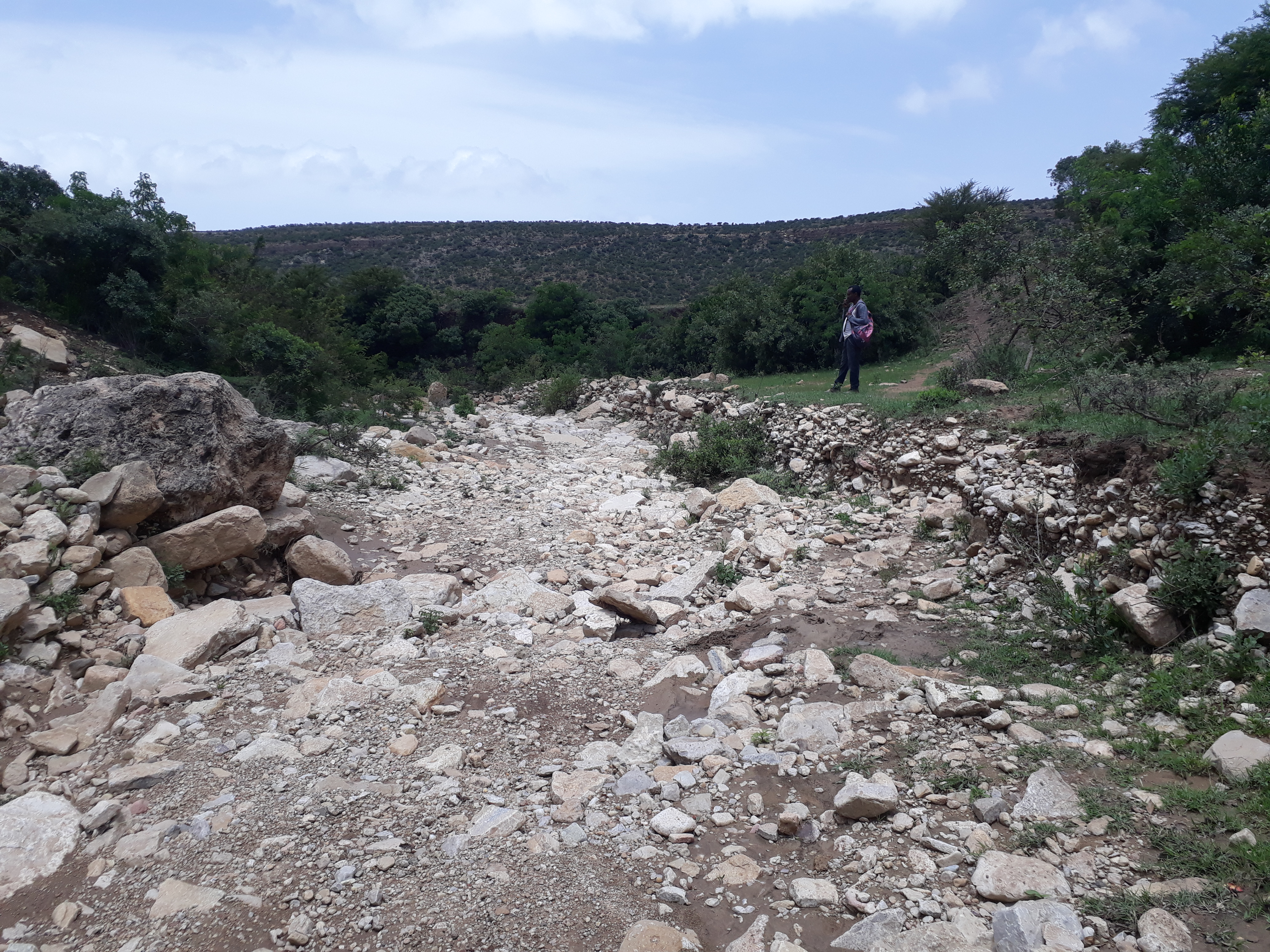
- Reforestation in Addilal

- Location within Ethiopia
- Coordinates: 13°41′N 39°19′E
- Country: Ethiopia
- Region: Tigray
- Zone: Debub Misraqawi (Southeastern)
- Woreda: Dogu'a Tembien

Area
  - Total: 73.59 km^{2} (28.41 sq mi)
- Elevation: 2,200 m (7,200 ft)
- Time zone: UTC+3 (EAT)

Addilal is a tabia or municipality in the Dogu'a Tembien district of the Tigray Region of Ethiopia. The tabia centre is in Addilal village, located approximately 19 km (12 mi) to the east of the woreda town Hagere Selam.

== Geography ==
The tabia stretches down from the Arebay peaks in Dogu'a Tembien towards Suluh river. The highest place is the top of the Amba Aradam Sandstone cliff high above Addilal village (2600 m a.s.l.) and the lowest place the junction of Suluh and Ch'eqofo Rivers (1830 m a.s.l.).

=== Geology ===
From the higher to the lower locations, the following geological formations are present:

- Amba Aradam Formation
- Agula Shale
- Mekelle Dolerite
- Antalo Limestone
- Quaternary alluvium and freshwater tufa

=== Geomorphology and soils ===
The main geomorphic unit is the incised Giba plateau (upstream of future Lake Giba). Corresponding soil types are:

- Associated soil types
  - complex of rock outcrops, very stony and very shallow soils ((Lithic) Leptosol)
  - shallow, stony, dark, loamy soils on calcaric material (Rendzic Leptosol)
  - shallow to very shallow, very stony, loamy soils (Skeletic/Leptic Cambisol and Regosol)
- Inclusions
  - Deep, dark cracking clays with good fertility, but problems of waterlogging (Chromic and Pellic Vertisol)
  - Shallow, stony loam soils with moderate fertility (Eutric Regosol and Cambisol)
  - Brown to dark, silty clay loams to loamy sands developed on alluvium, with good natural fertility (Fluvisol)

=== Climate ===
The rainfall pattern shows a very high seasonality with 70 to 80% of the annual rain falling in July and August. Mean temperature in Ch'eqofo (a central place in the tabia at 2120 metres above sea level) is 21 °C, oscillating between average daily minimum of 11.9 °C and maximum of 29.7 °C. The contrasts between day and night air temperatures are much larger than seasonal contrasts.

=== Water availability ===
As there are no permanent rivers besides Suluh, the presence of springs is of utmost importance for the local people. The main springs in the tabia are May Cheqofo in Addi Gedged and May Gura'ira'i in Haddinnet. In this area with rains that last only for a couple of months per year, reservoirs of different sizes allow harvesting runoff from the rainy season for further use in the dry season. There are traditional surface water harvesting ponds, particularly in places without permanent springs, called rahaya. In addition, horoyo, household ponds, recently constructed with variable success through campaigns.

=== Vegetation and exclosures ===
The tabia holds several exclosures, areas that are set aside for regreening. Wood harvesting and livestock range are not allowed there. Besides effects on biodiversity, water infiltration, protection from flooding, sediment deposition, carbon sequestration, people commonly have economic benefits from these exclosures through grass harvesting, beekeeping and other non-timber forest products. The local inhabitants also consider it as "land set aside for future generations". In this tabia, some exclosures are managed by the EthioTrees project. They have as an additional benefit that the villagers receive carbon credits for the sequestered CO_{2}, as part of a carbon offset programme. The revenues are then reinvested in the villages, according to the priorities of the communities; it may be for an additional class in the village school, a water pond, or conservation in the exclosures. Addilal (exclosure), near the tabia centre (144.81 ha) is managed by the Ethiotrees project.

=== Settlements ===
The tabia centre Addilal holds a few administrative offices, a health post, a primary school, and some small shops. There are a few more primary schools across the tabia. The main other populated places are:

- Addi Gedged
- Hutsa
- Ch'eqofo
- Dagiyergis

== Agriculture and livelihood ==
The population lives essentially from crop farming, supplemented with off-season work in nearby towns. The land is dominated by farmlands which are clearly demarcated and are cropped every year. Hence the agricultural system is a permanent upland farming system. The farmers have adapted their cropping systems to the spatio-temporal variability in rainfall. Extensive areas with steep slopes have been protected and there is strong vegetation regrowth.

== History and culture ==
=== History ===
The history of the tabia is strongly confounded with the history of Tembien.

=== Religion and churches ===
Most inhabitants are Orthodox Christians. Among others, the following churches are located in the tabia: Giyergis and Addilal Maryam.

=== Inda Siwa, the local beer houses ===
In the main villages, there are traditional beer houses (Inda Siwa), often in unique settings, which are a good place for resting and chatting with the local people. The most renown are in the tabia's main village Addilal: Tekle Berhe, Nigisti Teka and Mulubrhan Kindeya.

== Roads and communication ==
The main road Mekelle – Hagere Selam – Abiy Addi runs 5–10 km south of the tabia. Further, a rural access road links Addilal village to the main asphalt road. Inhabitants need to walk long distances on foot to get transportation service.

== Tourism ==
Its mountainous nature and proximity to Mekelle makes the tabia fit for tourism, yet its potential is largely unexplored.

Two trekking routes cross the southern part of this tabia. The tracks are not marked on the ground but can be followed using downloaded .GPX files.

- Trek 23, from the three olive trees ("Mi'iraf Janhoy" at 1940 metres above sea level in Addi Azmera), across Addilal, and further up towards Ekli Imba the peak of the Medayq massif that dominates the landscape at the north (2799 m)
- Trek 24, from the main bridge on Giba River, through Emni Ankelalu to Addilal village

Facilities are very basic. One may be invited to spend the night in a rural homestead or ask permission to pitch a tent. Hotels are available in Hagere Selam and Mekelle.
