= Addi Walka =

Municipality in Ethiopia

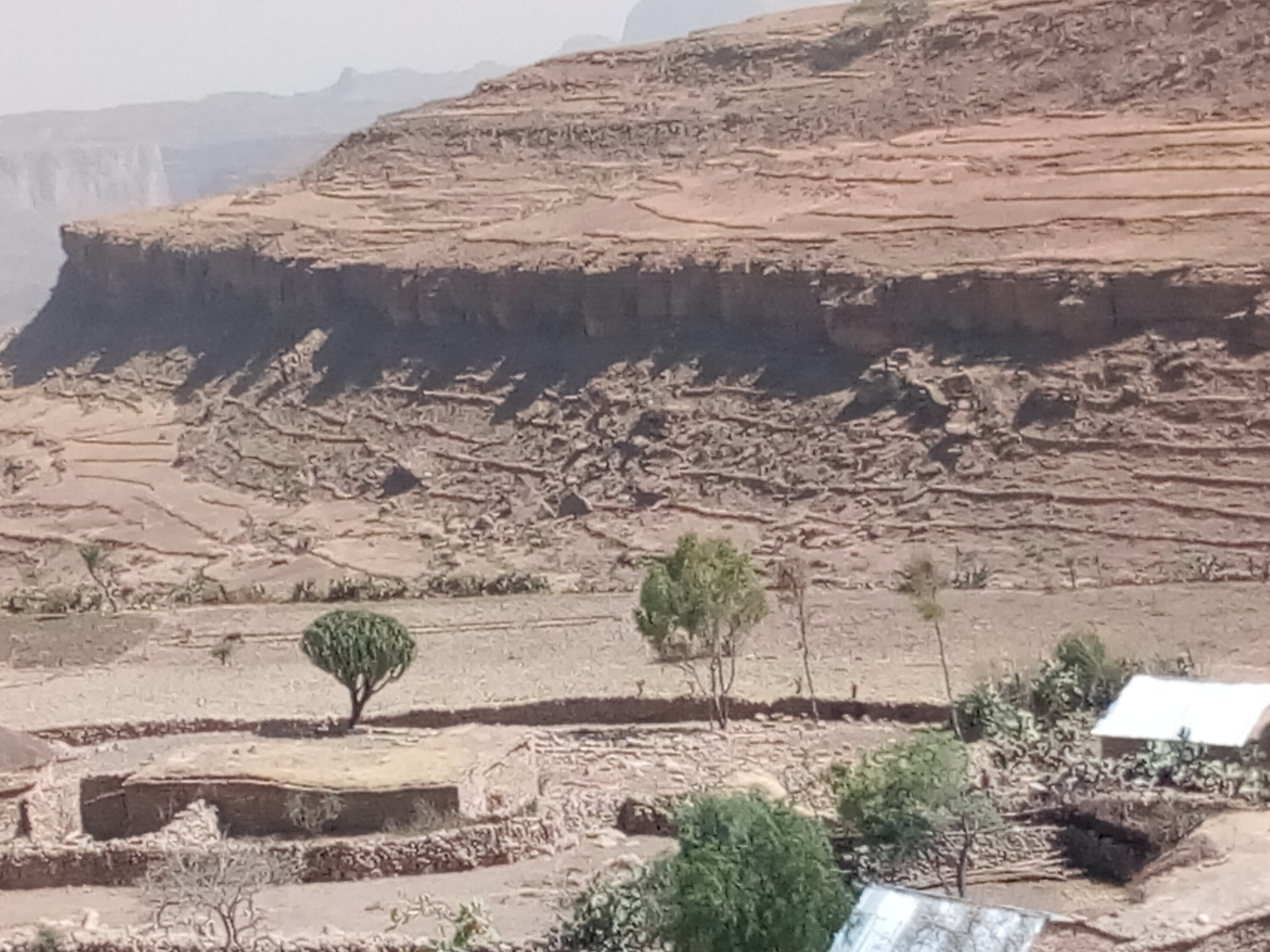

- Location within Ethiopia
- Coordinates: 13°43′N 39°18′E
- Country: Ethiopia
- Region: Tigray
- Zone: Debub Misraqawi (Southeastern)
- Woreda: Dogu'a Tembien

Area
  - Total: 66.61 km^{2} (25.72 sq mi)
- Elevation: 2,400 m (7,900 ft)
- Time zone: UTC+3 (EAT)

Addi Walka is a tabia or municipality in the Dogu'a Tembien district of the Tigray Region of Ethiopia. The tabia centre is in Kelkele village, located approximately 16 km northeast of the woreda town Hagere Selam.

== Geography ==
The tabia stretches down from Dogu'a Tembien's northern ridges towards the Agefet valley. The highest place is the cliff under Arebay (2,500 m.a.s.l.) and the lowest place along Agefet River (1,728 m.a.s.l.).

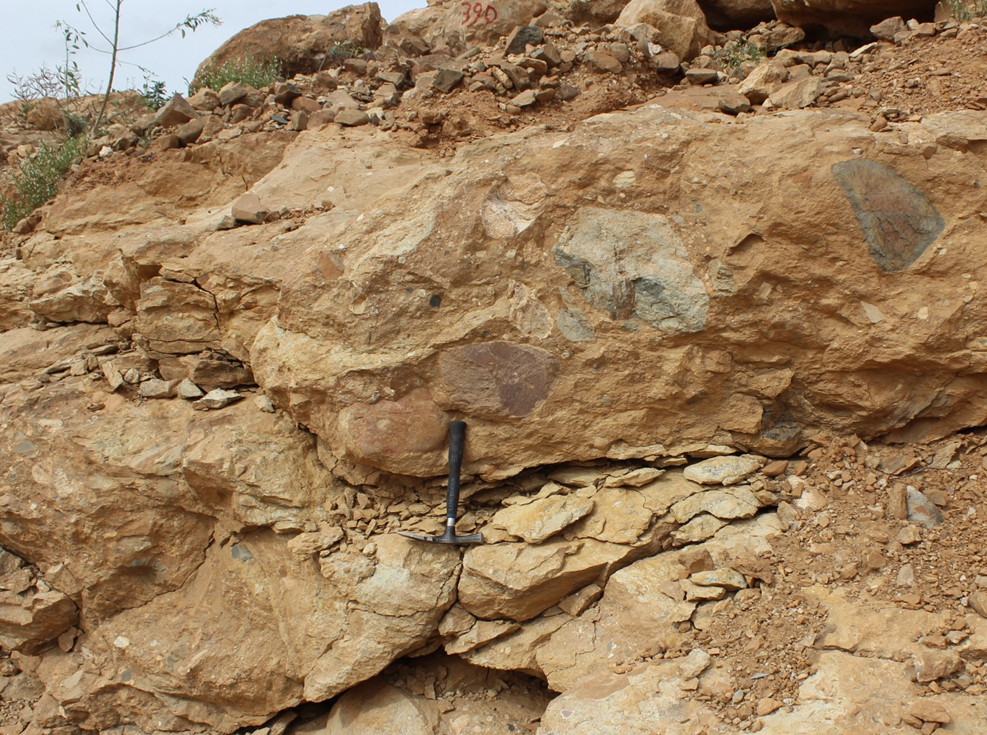
Edaga Arbi glacials can be observed in the lowermost places, near Agefet River

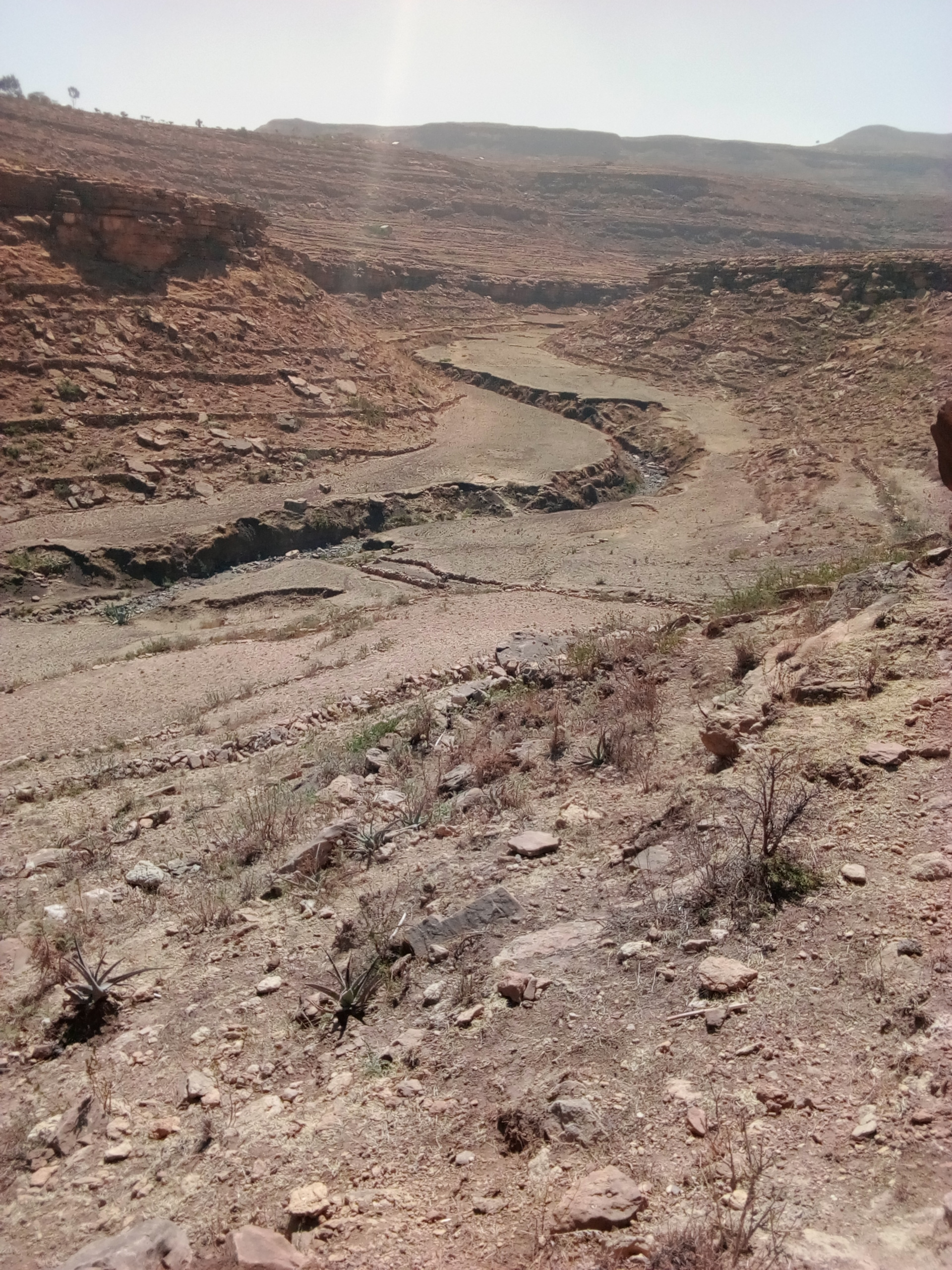
Valley in Addi Walka with Quaternary valley bottom fill

=== Geology ===
From the higher to the lower locations, the following geological formations are present:

- Amba Aradam Formation
- Agula Shale
- Antalo Limestone
- Adigrat Sandstone
- Edaga Arbi Glacials
- Quaternary alluvium and freshwater tufa

=== Climate ===
The rainfall pattern shows a very high seasonality with 70 to 80% of the annual rain falling in July and August. Mean temperature in Kelkele is 18.8 °C, oscillating between average daily minimum of 10.5 °C and maximum of 26.7 °C. The contrasts between day and night air temperatures are much larger than seasonal contrasts.

=== Springs ===
As there are no permanent rivers, the presence of springs is of utmost importance for the local people. The main springs in the tabia are:

- May Deqisa'iri in Bet Moka'i
- Springs along Agefet River

=== Reservoirs ===
In this area with rains that last only for a couple of months per year, reservoirs of different sizes allow harvesting runoff from the rainy season for further use in the dry season. Traditional surface water harvesting ponds, particularly in places without permanent springs, are called rahaya. Horoyo, household ponds, have been recently constructed through campaigns.

=== Settlements ===
The tabia centre Kelkele holds a few administrative offices, a health post, a primary school, and some small shops. There are a few more primary schools across the tabia. The main other populated places are:

- Bet Moka'e
- Kidmi Tseged
- Ch'iwa
- Halah Gheralta
- Ziban Kebkeb
- Hatemti
- Hazgi

== Agriculture and livelihood ==
The population lives essentially from crop farming, supplemented with off-season work in nearby towns. The land is dominated by farmlands which are clearly demarcated and are cropped every year. Hence the agricultural system is a permanent upland farming system. The farmers have adapted their cropping systems to the spatio-temporal variability in rainfall.

== History and culture ==
=== History ===
The history of the tabia is strongly confounded with the history of Tembien.

=== Religion and churches ===
Most inhabitants are Orthodox Christians. The following churches are located in the tabia:

- Medhane Alem
- Hatemti Maryam
- Inda Gabir Amblo
- Abune Ego'id
- Bet Moka'e Mika'el
- Abune Ayezgi
- Abune Aregawi
- Kidane Mihret
- Bet Moka'e Mika'el

=== Inda Siwa ===
In the main villages, there are traditional beer houses (Inda Siwa), often in unique settings, which are a good place for resting and chatting with the local people. Most renown in the tabia is Tkun Asgedom at Bet Moka'e.

== Roads and communication ==
The main road Mekelle – Hagere Selam – Abiy Addi runs some 7–12 km south of the tabia. People have the choice to walk to Ala'isa or Tsigereda to find bus services to the towns. A rural access road (sometimes disused) links Addi Walka to the main asphalt road.

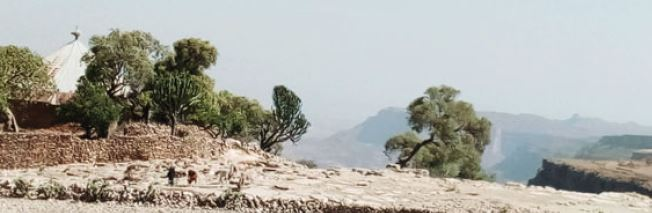
View from Iriya church towards Addi Walka

== Tourism ==
Its mountainous nature and proximity to Mekelle makes the tabia fit for tourism.

=== Geotouristic sites ===
The high variability of geological formations and the rugged topography invites for geological and geographic tourism or "geotourism". Geosites in the tabia include especially the dissected, Grand Canyon-like landscapes.

=== Trekking routes ===
A trekking route has been established in this tabia. The track of Gh1, from south to north across the tabia, is not marked on the ground but can be followed using downloaded .GPX files.

=== Accommodation and facilities ===
The facilities are very basic. One may be invited to spend the night in a rural homestead or ask permission to pitch a tent. Hotels are available in Hagere Selam and Mekelle.
