= Harehuwa exclosure =

Exclosure for woodland restoration in Ethiopia

- Location within Ethiopia
- Location: Mahbere Sillasie municipality, in Dogu’a Tembien district, Ethiopia
- Nearest city: Hagere Selam
- Coordinates: 13.679°N 39.158°E
- Established: 1999

Harehuwa is an exclosure located in the Dogu'a Tembien woreda of the Tigray Region in Ethiopia. The area has been protected since 1999 by the local community.

== Environmental characteristics ==
- Average slope gradient: 55%
- Aspect: the exclosure is oriented towards the west
- Minimum altitude: 2180 metres
- Maximum altitude: 2300 metres
- Lithology: Adigrat Sandstone

== Management ==
As a general rule, cattle ranging and wood harvesting are not allowed. The grasses are harvested once yearly and taken to the homesteads of the village to feed livestock. Physical soil and water conservation has been implemented to enhance infiltration, and vegetation growth.

== Benefits for the community ==
Setting aside such areas fits with the long-term vision of the communities, where hiza’iti lands are set aside for use by the future generations. It also has direct benefits for the community:

- improved infiltration
- improved ground water availability
- honey production
- climate ameliorator (temperature, moisture)
- carbon sequestration, dominantly sequestered in the soil, and additionally in the woody vegetation

== Improved ecosystem ==
With vegetation growth, biodiversity in this exclosure has strongly improved: there is more varied vegetation and wildlife.

=== Trees ===
The main tree species found in the exclosure are:

- Sand olive (Dodonaea viscosa subsp. angustifolia)
- Gwarri (Euclea schimperi)
- Lantana viburnoides
- Natal rhus (Rhus natalensis)

=== Soils ===
The main soil type in the exclosure are Phaeozems, essentially a remnant of the time when the area was covered with natural forest.
