= Dogu'a Tembien =

District in Tigray Region, Ethiopia

Dogu'a Tembien ደጉዓ ተምቤን
- Woreda
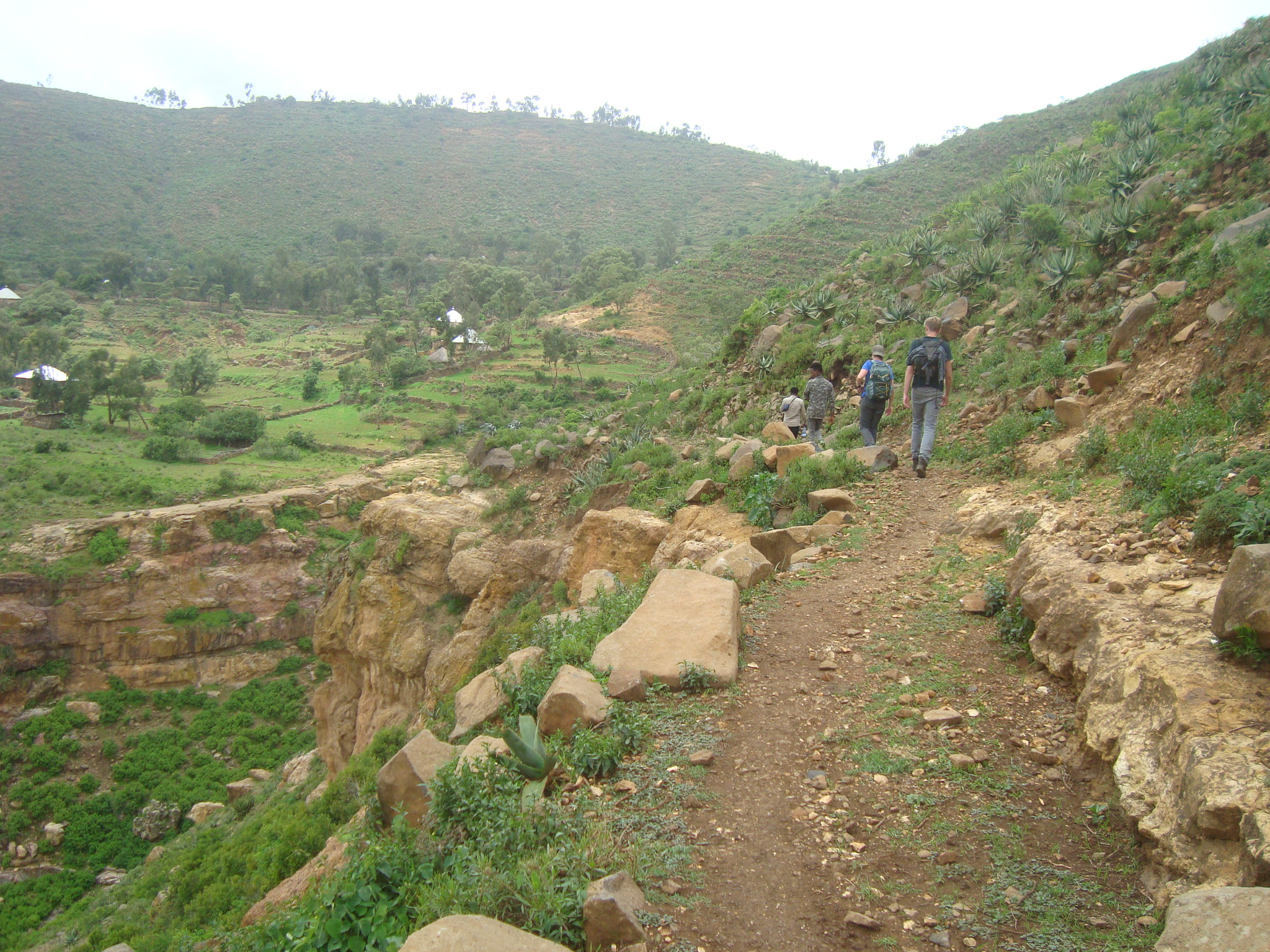

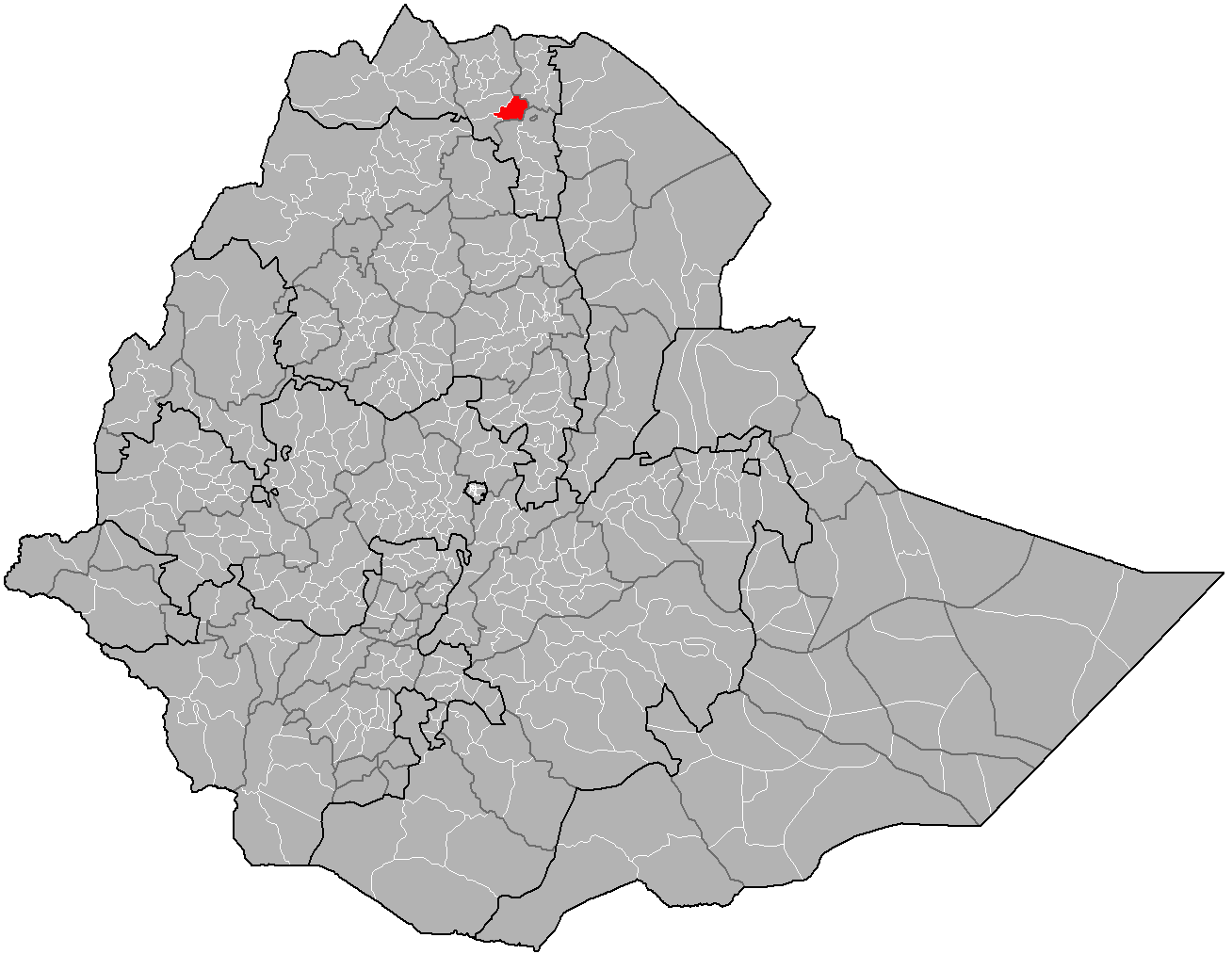
- Country: Ethiopia
- Region: Tigray
- Zone: Debub Misraqawi (Southeast)

Area
  - Total: 1,034 km^{2} (399 sq mi)

Population (2007)
  - Total: 126,953

Dogu'a Tembien (Tigrinya: ደጉዓ ተምቤን, "Upper Tembien", sometimes transliterated as Degua Tembien or Dägʿa Tämben) is a woreda in Tigray Region, Ethiopia. It is named in part after the former province of Tembien. Nowadays, the mountainous district is part of the Southeastern Tigray Zone. The administrative centre of this woreda is Hagere Selam.

== History ==
Dogu'a Tembien holds numerous prehistoric sites, which have been dated to the Middle Stone Age in Ayninbirkekin, or Pastoral Neolithic in Aregen and Menachek.

== Geography ==
=== Major mountains ===
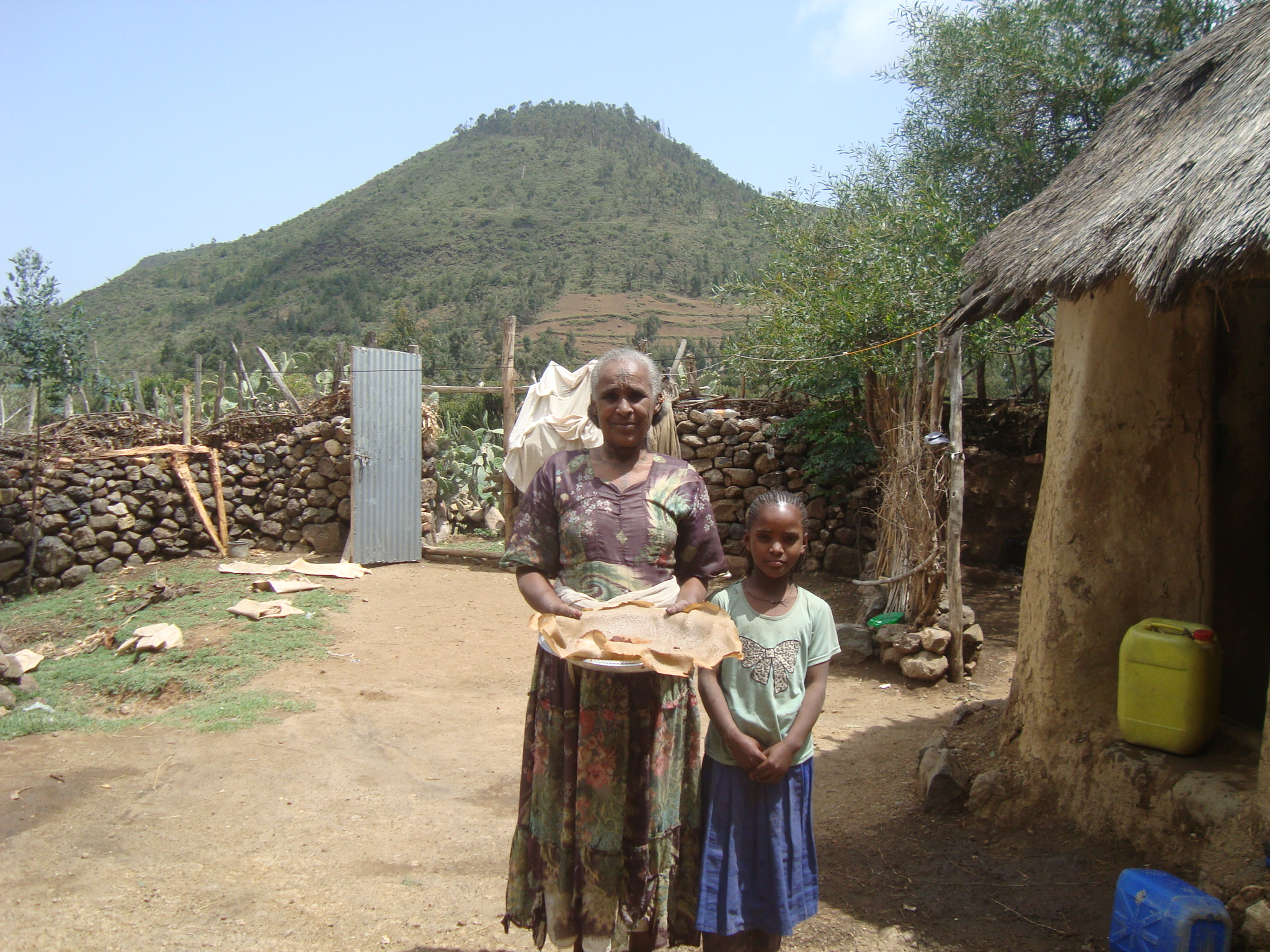
Mount Gumawta, one of the peaks of the Tsatsen mesa, the highest location of Dogu'a Tembien

- Tsatsen, 2815 metres, a wide mesa between Hagere Selam and Inda Maryam Qorar (13°37′N 39°10′E)
- Ekli Imba, 2799 metres, summit of the Arebay massif in Arebay tabia or district (13°43′N 39°16′E)
- Imba Zuw'ala, 2710 metres, near Hagere Selam (13°39′N 39°11′E)
- Aregen, 2660 metres, in Aregen tabia (13°37′N 39°5′E)
- Dabba Selama, 2630 metres, in Haddinnet tabia (13°43′N 39°12′E) (not to be confused with the homonymous monastery)
- Imba Dogu'a, 2610 metres, in Mizane Birhan tabia (13°37′N 39°16′E)
- Imba Ra'isot, 2590 metres, in Ayninbirkekin tabia (13°40′N 39°15′E)
- Itay Sara, 2460 metres, in Haddinnet tabia (13°43′N 39°10′E)
- Imba Bete Giyergis, 2390 metres, in Debre Nazret tabia (13°30′N 39°19′E)
- Tsili, 2595 metres, in Haddinnet tabia (13°44′N 39°11′E)

=== Lowest places ===
The lowest places are where the main rivers leave the district. They are often located not far from the highest points, what indicates the magnitude of the relief

- Along Giba River, near Kemishana, 1406 metres (13°29′N 39°07′E)
- Along Agefet River, north of Azef, 1720 metres (13°48′N 39°14′E)
- Along Tsaliet River, underneath the promontory that holds Dabba Selama monastery, 1763 metres (13°42′N 39°05′E)
- At the junction of Tanqwa and Tsech'i Rivers, a bit upstream from May Lomin, 1897 metres (13°37′N 39°01′E)

=== Mountain passes ===
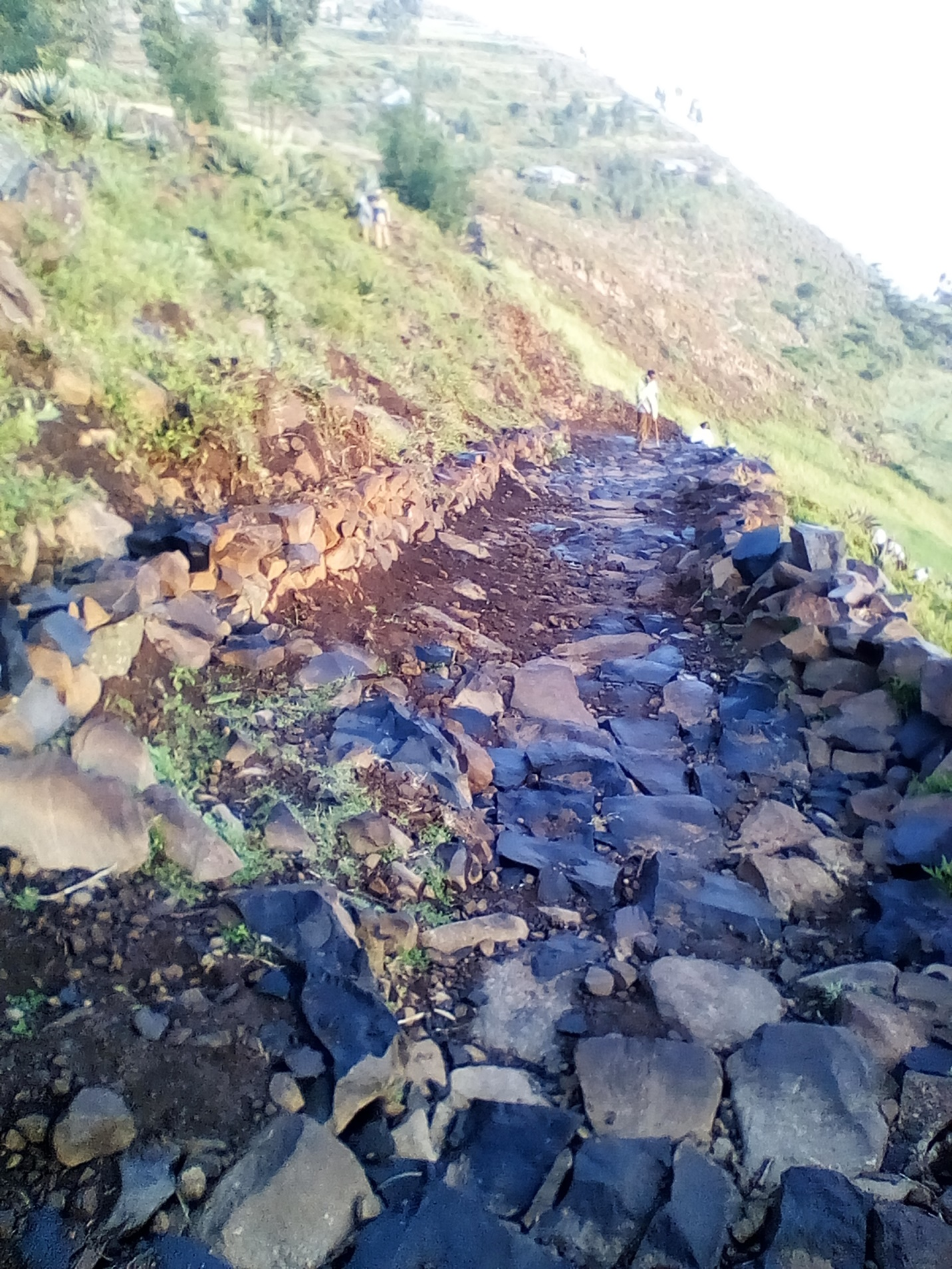
Maintenance of footpath towards Ksad Addi Amyuk

Since ages, major footpaths and roads in Dogu'a Tembien have been using mountain passes, called ksad, what means "neck" in Tigrinya language.

- Ksad Halah (13°40′N 39°15′E), a narrow pass between Giba and Tsaliet basins, also crossed by the main road
- Ksad Miheno (13°40′N 39°13′E), another pass with several footpaths linking Giba and Tsaliet basins; here, the main road is a ridge road and crosses the pass transversally
- Ksad Addi Amyuk (13°39.3′N 39°10.3′E), at 2710 metres, is the highest pass of the district, where the main road passes before entering Hagere Selam
- Ksad Mederbay (13°38.75′N 39°15.3′E), a V-shaped pass in a dolerite ridge, used to be the main entrance gate to Dogu'a Tembien, when coming from Mekelle with many converging footpaths and mule tracks. It was also a battle field during the Ethiopian Civil War of the 1980s
- Ksad Azef (13°44.2′N 39°13′E) is a place through which the Tembien highlands could relatively easily be accessed when coming from the Gheralta lowlands. During the Italian invasion, it was an important battlefield during the First Battle of Tembien – The Italians called it Passo Abaro
- Ksad Adawro (13°37.6′N 39°9.25′E) is not a real pass, but a relatively level ledge between two cliffs
- The town of Hagere Selam is located on a wide saddle
- Ksad Korowya (13°42.16′N 39°7.3′E), remotely located along Tsaliet River, is a spectacular pass in the sandstone landscape, to be crossed before ascending to Dogu'a Tembien from the northwest

=== Ethnography ===
Place names show that the Tembien Tigrayans or Tembienot were partly Agew in the past; still nowadays, there are Agew speakers in Abergele, directly southwest of Dogu'a Tembien. The population of Dogu'a Tembien is composed of the original population with a certain admixture of descendants of slaves and serfs who were brought from southwestern Ethiopia, and were in the service of bigger land owners during feudality. There is no formal discrimination, and all have adopted Tigrinya language and identify as Tigrayans today. However, when it comes to marriage, in-laws may informally verify the ancestry of bride or groom.

=== Administrative division ===
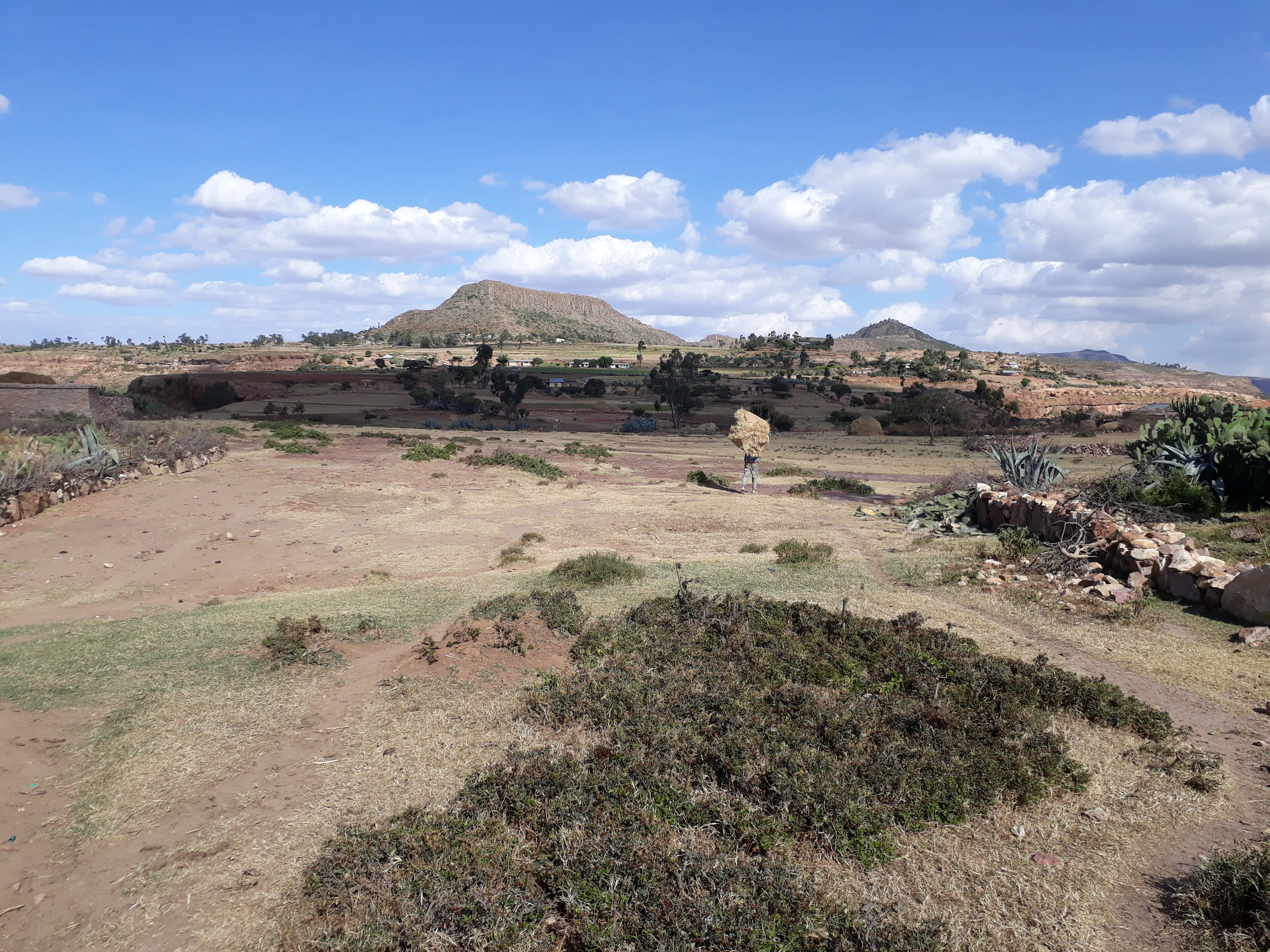
Tsili village in Haddinnet

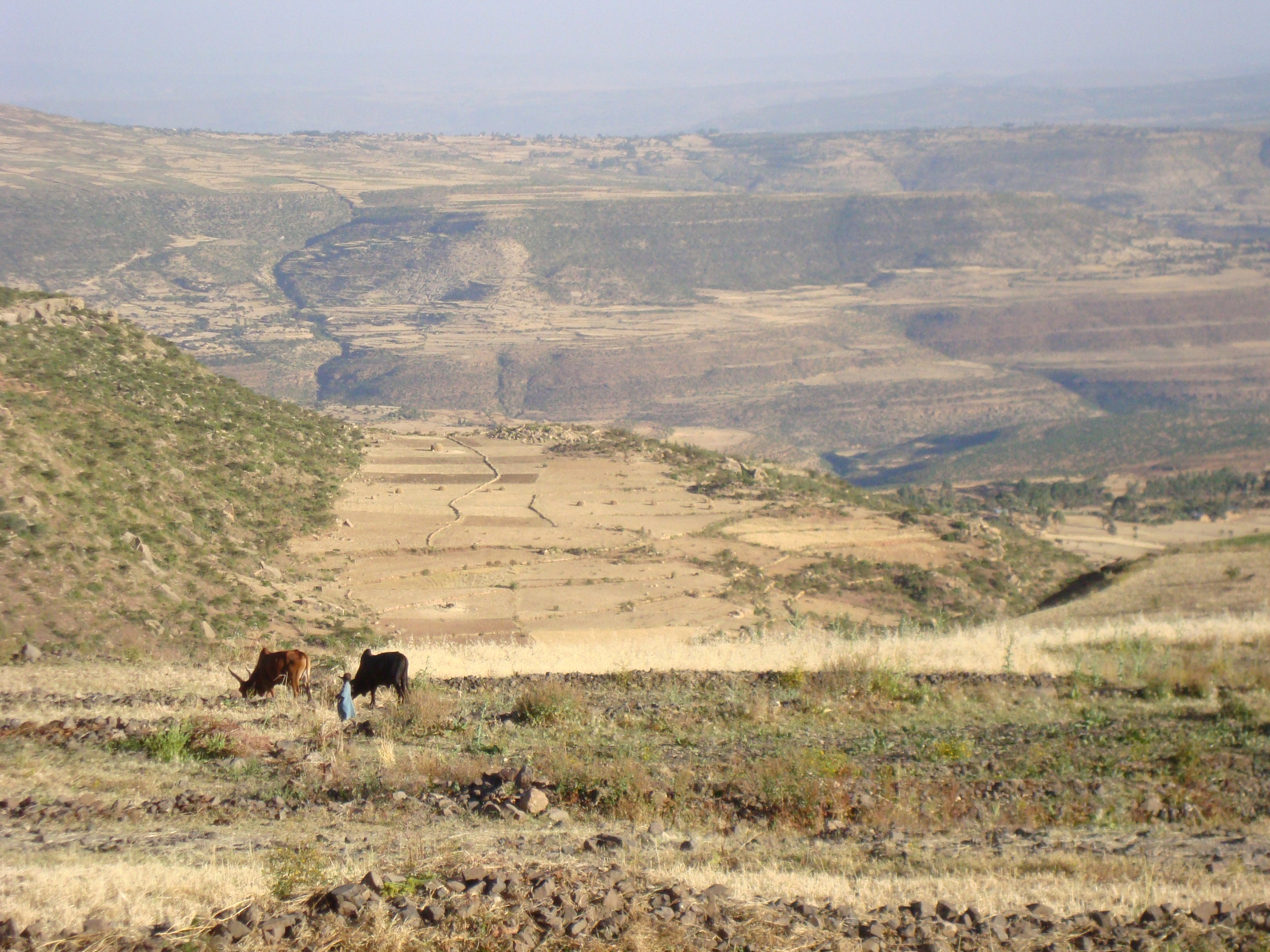
Landscape in Hamushte Kebeb

Dogu'a Tembien comprises 24 tabias or municipalities (status 2019), which have been mapped with their boundaries:

- Hagere Selam, woreda capital (13°38.9′N 39°10.7′E)
- Degol Woyane, tabia centre in Zala (13°40′N 39°6′E)
- Mahbere Sillasie, tabia centre in Guderbo (13°39′N 39°9′E)
- Selam, tabia centre in Addi Werho (13°40′N 39°12′E)
- Haddinnet, tabia centre in Addi Idaga (13°42′N 39°12′E)
- Addi Walka, tabia centre in Kelkele (13°43′N 39°18′E)
- Arebay, tabia centre in Arebay village (13°43′N 39°17′E)
- Ayninbirkekin, tabia centre in Halah (13°40′N 39°14′E). This tabia includes the previous Hamushte Kebeb tabia, holding the five villages of Hechi, Addi Qolqwal, May Be'ati, Halah and Tsigaba.
- Addilal, tabia centre in Addilal village (13°41′N 39°19′E)
- Addi Azmera, tabia centre in Tukhul (13°38′N 39°20′E)
- Emni Ankelalu, tabia centre in Mitslal Afras (13°39′N 39°22′E)
- Mizane Birhan, tabia centre in Ma'idi (13°37′N 39°16′E)
- Mika'el Abiy, tabia centre in Megesta (13°37′N 39°12′E)
- Lim'at, tabia centre in Maygua (13°37′N 39°8′E)
- Melfa, tabia centre in Melfa village (13°38′N 39°8′E), birthplace of Ethiopian emperor Yohannes IV
- Aregen, tabia centre in Addi Gotet (13°37′N 39°6′E)
- Menachek, tabia centre in Addi Bayro (13°35′N 39°5′E)
- Mizan, tabia centre in Kerene (13°35′N 39°3′E). This tabia includes Arefa (13°35.4′N 39°1.7′E), reputedly birthplace of the Queen of Sheba
- Simret, tabia centre in Dengolo (13°34′N 39°7′E). This tabia includes the village of Mennawe (13°34′N 39°06′E), birthplace of Ethiopian general Ras Alula Abba Nega
- Seret, tabia centre in Inda Maryam Qorar (13°35′N 39°8′E)
- Walta, tabia centre in Da'erere (13°35′N 39°11′E)
- Inda Sillasie, tabia centre in Migichi (13°33′N 39°12′E)
- Amanit, tabia centre in Addi Qeshofo village (13°33′N 39°15′E)
- Debre Nazret, tabia centre in Togogwa (13°34′N 39°18′E)

=== Population ===
Based on the 2007 national census conducted by the Central Statistical Agency of Ethiopia (CSA), this woreda had a total population of 113,595, an increase of 28% over the 1994 census, of whom 56,955 were men and 56,640 women; 7,270 or 6.4% were urban inhabitants. A total of 25,290 households were counted in this woreda, resulting in an average of 4.5 persons per household, and 24,591 housing units. The majority of the inhabitants said they practiced Ethiopian Orthodox Christianity, with 99.89% reporting that as their religion.

The 1994 national census reported a total population for this woreda of 89,037, of whom 44,408 were men and 44,629 were women. The largest ethnic group reported in Dogu'a Tembien was the Tigrayan (99.87%). Tigrinya was spoken as a first language by 99.89%. Concerning education, 7% of the population were considered literate, which was less than the Zone average of 14%; 8% of children aged 7–12 were in primary school; 0.14% of the children aged 13–14 were in junior secondary school, and 0.21% of the inhabitants aged 15–18 were in senior secondary school. Concerning sanitary conditions, about 29% of the urban houses and 15% of all houses had access to safe drinking water at the time of the census; 6% of the urban and 2.4% of the total had toilet facilities.

== 2020 woreda reorganisation ==
As of 2020, Dogu'a Tembien's territory belongs to the following new woredas:

- Dogu'a Tembien (new, smaller, woreda)
- Hagere Selam town
- Tanqwa Mellash woreda (part of it)
- Geralta (part of it)
- Inderta (part of it)

== Geology ==
=== Overview ===
The East African Orogeny led to the growth of a mountain chain in the Precambrian (up to 800 million years ago or Ma), that was largely eroded afterwards. Around 600 Ma, the Gondwana break-up led to the presence of tectonic structures and a Palaeozoic planation surface, that extents to the north and west of the Dogu'a Tembien massif.

Subsequently, there was the deposition of sedimentary and volcanic formations, from older (at the foot of the massif) to younger, near the summits. From Palaeozoic to Triassic, Dogu'a Tembien was located near the South Pole. The (reactivate) Precambrian extensional faults guided the deposition of glacial sediments (Edaga Arbi Glacials and Enticho Sandstone). Later alluvial plain sediments were deposited (Adigrat Sandstone). The break-up of Gondwana (Late Palaeozoic to Early Triassic) led to an extensional tectonic phase, what caused the lowering of large parts of the Horn of Africa. As a consequence a marine transgression occurred, leading to the deposition of marine sediments (Antalo Limestone and Agula Shale).

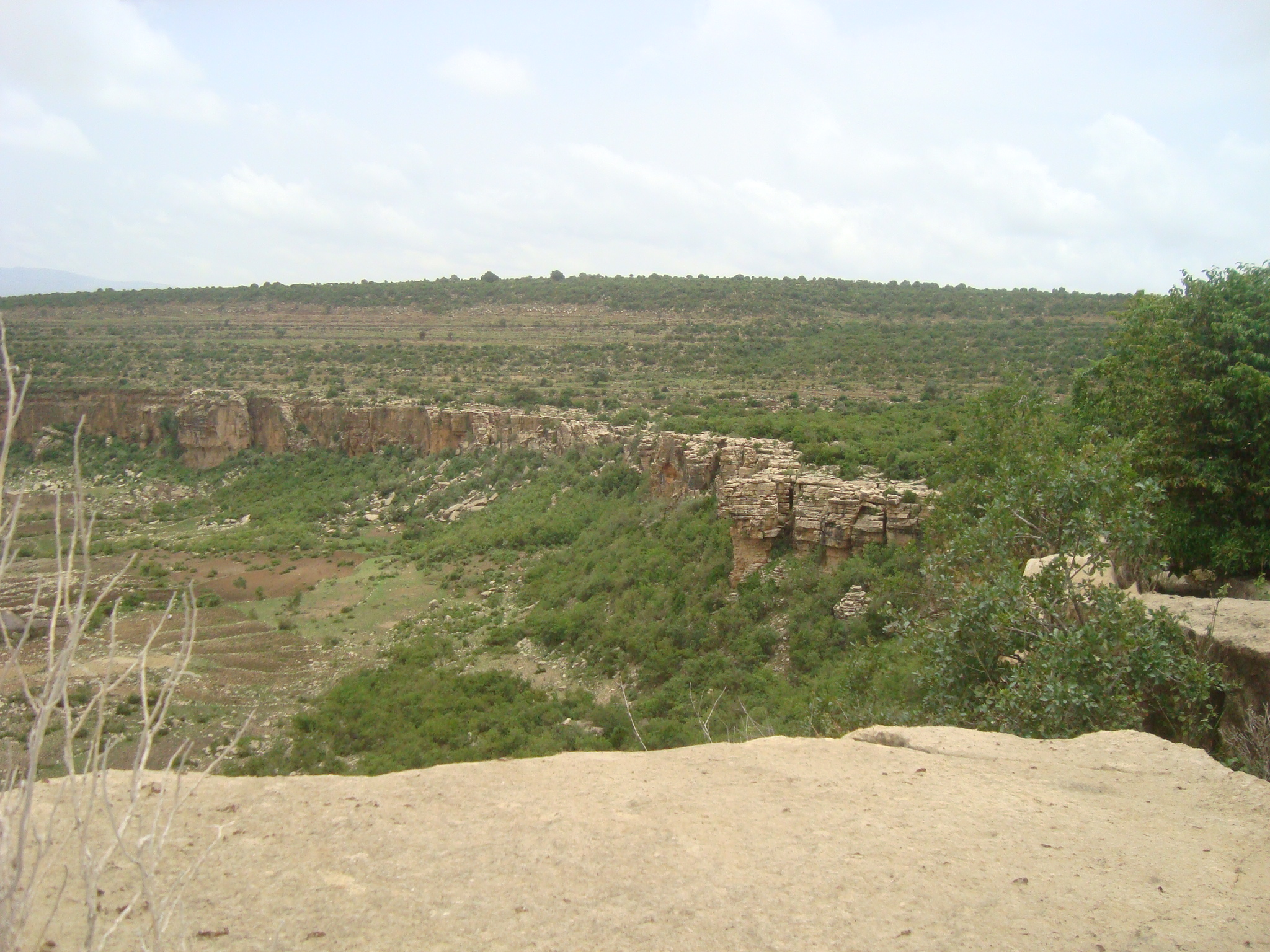
The Antalo Limestone cliff at Mishlam in the southeastern part of Dogu'a Tembien

At the end of the Mesozoic tectonic phase, a new (Cretaceous) planation took place. After that, the deposition of continental sediments (Amba Aradam Formation) indicates the presence of less shallow seas, what was probably caused by a regional uplift. In the beginning of the Caenozoic, there was a relative tectonic quiescence, during which the Amba Aradam Sandstones were partially eroded what led to the formation of a new planation surface.

In the Eocene, the Afar plume a broad regional uplift deformed the lithosphere, leading to the eruption of flood basalts. The magma followed pre-existing tectonic lineaments. A mere thickness of 400 metres of basalt indicates that the pre-trap rock topography was more elevated in Dogu'a Tembien as compared to more southerly areas. Three major formations may be distinguished: lower basalts, interbedded lacustrine deposits and upper basalts. Almost at the same time, the Mekelle Dolerite intruded the Mesozoic sediments following joints and faults.

A new magma intrusion occurred in the Early Miocene, what gave rise to a few phonolite plugs in Dogu'a Tembien. The present geomorphology is marked by deep valleys, eroded as a result of the regional uplift. Throughout the Quaternary deposition of alluvium and freshwater tufa occurred in the valley bottoms.

=== Fossils ===
In Dogu'a Tembien, there are two main fossil-bearing geological units. The Antalo Limestone (upper Jurassic) is the largest. Its marine deposits comprise mainly benthic marine invertebrates. Also, the Tertiary lacustrine deposits, interbedded in the basalt formations, contain a range of silicified mollusc fossils.

In the Antalo Limestone: large Paracenoceratidae cephalopods (nautilus); Nerineidae indet.; sea urchins; Rhynchonellid brachiopod; crustaceans; coral colonies; crinoid stems.

In the Tertiary silicified lacustrine deposits: Pila (gastropod); Lanistes sp.; Pirenella conica; and land snails (Achatinidae indet.).

All snail shells, both fossil and recent, are called t'uyo in Tigrinya language, which means 'helicoidal'.

=== Natural caves ===
The vast areas with outcropping Antalo Limestone hold numerous caves.

At Zeyi (13°33′N 39°9′E), the monumental Zeyi Abune Aregawi church holds the entrance to Northern Ethiopia's largest cave. The 364-metres long oval gallery displays stalactites, stalagmites, decametre-high columns, bell-holes following joints, and speleothems on walls and floor.

The 145-metres long Zeleqwa horizontal gallery is located in a cliff nearby the river of the same name (13°38′N 39°7′E). At the upper side of the cliff, there is an alignment of cavities: the "windows" of a gallery parallel to cliff and river. The cave floor holds with clay pots that would have served as food containers for villagers who went there hiding during an early 20th C. conflict.

The Tinsehe caves, a cave system opening into the Upper Tsaliet River gorge near Addi Idaga (13°42′N 39°12′E). The entrance near a small church is behind a waterfall 100 meters high.

The Dabo Zellelew cave in Aregen at a height of about 2000 metres, has been explored over 14.4 m but its distance is claimed to be way longer (13.621862°N 39.033077°E). It contains lithic tools, potsherds, engravings and paintings of Pastoral Neolithic age.

The Mihdar Ab'ur cave in the village of Mahba in Aregen at a height of about 2500 metres, is some 64 m long (13.620592°N 39.051313°E). It contains engravings and paintings of Pastoral Neolithic age.

The Danei Kawlos cave in the Tsech'i gorge at the west of Menachek at a height of about 2020 metres, is some 13.5 metres long (13.621862°N 39.033077°E). It contains lithic tools, potsherds, and faunal remains of Pastoral Neolithic age.

The May Hib'o cave (13°31′N 39°14′E), a 70-metres long horizontal gallery, holds underground springs.

Numerous other unexplored cave entrances are visible in Antalo Limestone cliffs.

=== Rock-hewn churches ===
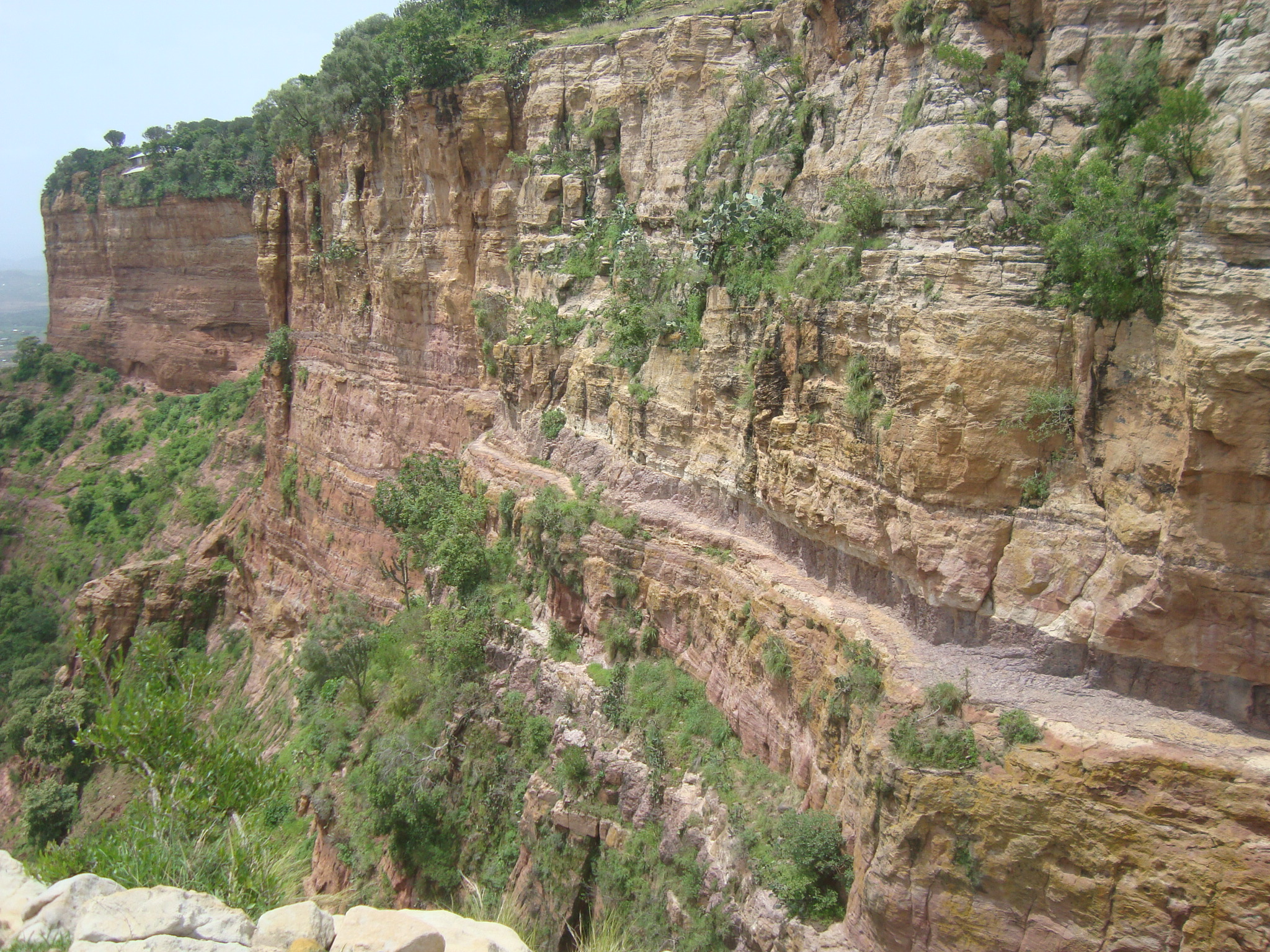
Dabba Selama monastery on a mesa - the visitor will walk over the narrow ledge and then climb the vertical cliff

Like several other districts in Tigray, Dogu'a Tembien has a number of rock-hewn churches. These have literally been hewn from rock, mainly between the 10th and 14th centuries.

The almost inaccessible Dabba Selama monastery (13°41.67′N 39°6.03′E) is assumed to be the first monastery established in Ethiopia, by Saint Frumentius. The intrepid visitor will climb down, then scramble over narrow ledges along precipices, and finally climb an overhanging cliff. The mesa also comprises a church hewn in Adigrat Sandstone, in shape of a small basilica. The carvers attempted to establish four bays as well as with a recess. The pillars are rounded (which is uncommon) and expand at either end, supporting arches that appear as triangles. Women are not allowed to do the ascent, nor to visit monastery or church. Independently from the difficult access to the monastery, the surrounding sandstone geomorphology is unique.

The Amani'el church in May Baha (13°40′N 39°5.4′E) has also been carved in Adigrat Sandstone. Behind a pronaos (1960s), the rock church has cruciform columns, flat beams and a flat ceiling, a single arch, and a flat rear wall without apse. Windows give light to the church itself. Emperor Yohannes IV was baptised in this church.

The Yohannes rock church at Debre Sema'it (13°34.62′N 39°2.24′E) is located in the top of a rock pinnacle that overlooks Addi Nefas village. This church has also been hewn in Adigrat Sandstone.

The Lafa Gebri'al rock church (13°35.87′N 39°17.25′E) is now disused. It was hewn in a tufa plug. The church boosts a semi-circular wooden arch of approx. 1.5 metre across (in one piece).

Ruba Bich'i's village church (13°36′N 39°18′E) is also an ancient rock-hewn church in freshwater tufa, and still in use.

The church of Kurkura Mika'el (13°40′N 39°9′E), in a very scenic position in a small forest behind limestone pinnacles, is some 30 years old (File:Antalo Limestone at Kurkura.jpg). Behind it, the remnant of the earlier church established in a natural cave of 20 metres by 20 metres. The roof of the cave is covered with sooth, evidencing the fact that the villagers took cover here, during the Italian bombardments of the Tembien battles in the mid-1930s.

The Kidane Mihret rock church at Ab'aro (13°44.5′N 39°12.06′E), is surrounded by tufa plugs, springs and a cluster of trees. The church was established in widened caves of the tufa plug.

Just outside the district, on the western slopes of the Dogu'a Tembien massif, there are seven other rock churches.

Mika'el Samba (13°42.56′N 39°6.81′E) is a rock church hewn in Adigrat Sandstone. It holds grave cells off the main space. As Mika'el Samba is not a village church, priests are only present on the monthly Mika'els day, the twelfth day in the Ethiopian calendar.

The Maryam Hibeto rock church (13°42.67′N 39°6.44′E) is located at the edge of a church forest. It is hewn in Adigrat Sandstone, with a pronaos in front of it. On both sides of the main church, there are elongated chambers, maybe been the beginnings of an ambulatory. To enter the church, one has to go down a few. Remarkably, at the entrance, a pool of water is fed by a spring.

The Welegesa church (13°43′N 39°4′E) is hewn in Adigrat Sandstone. The entrance to the church is part of the rock, forming two courtyards, both hewn but not open at the upper side. The first courtyard holds graves; between the two, there is a block of stone with a cross in the window opening in its centre. The three-aisled church has a depth of four bays. There are entrances on both sides through hewn corridors. The church ceiling has a consistent height, holding cupolas, arches and capitals in each bay. The hewn tabot is in an apse. The sophisticated plan comprises a central axis and two open courtyards that cut deep into the rock.

The newly hewn Medhanie Alem rock church in Mt. Werqamba (13°42.86′N 39°00.27′E) is in a central, smaller peak (in Adigrat Sandstone).

Northwest of Abiy Addi, the Geramba rock church (13°38.84′N 39°1.55′E) is hewn in Tertiary silicified limestone, high up near the top to of the mountain. As a roof, a thin covering basalt layer was ingeniously used. The columns have a slightly cruciform plan and hold bracket capitals.

Itsiwto Maryam rock church (13°40′N 39°1′E) is hewn in Adigrat Sandstone. The church has a continuous hipped ceiling to the centre aisle. There are carved diagonal crosses as well as a cross carved above the arch into the sanctuary. The ceiling holds longitudinal beams that form a continuous lintel, which is similar to traditional Tigrayan workmanship. The church is at risk of collapse and hence access is not permitted.

The Kidane Mihret rock church of Addi Nefas (13°33.3′N 39°1.44′E) in Adigrat Sandstone is a rather primitive rock church, protected from the weather by a pronaos that surrounds the entrance. The church comprises two circular well-carved cells that are used for baptisms. Above the sanctuary there is a series of small blind arcades. Beside the ancient church, a new cave is under excavation. Down from the church there are irrigated tropical gardens. Under cover trees, farmers grow coffee, local hops (gesho), and a few orange or lemon trees. Grivet monkeys are common and prevent growing of bananas.

=== Other hewn caves ===
At several places, people have excavates caves in the sandstone. The larger ones, and most known are the TPLF caves in Addi Geza'iti. Here, in the 1980s, the party established underground rooms and offices cut out in sandstone cliffs, the TPLF carried out its political activities, including a major land reform; it was from here that the offensives were organised till the conquest of Addis Ababa in 1991. In nearby Melfa, the Amhara EPDM party had its own headquarters in a cave.

=== Traditional uses of rock ===
As Dogu'a Tembien holds a wide variety of rock types, there is expectedly a varied use of rock.

- Natural stone masonry. Preferentially, the easier shaped limestone and sandstone are used to build homesteads and churches, but particularly in the upland areas, basalt is also used. Traditionally, fermented mud will be used as mortar
- Fencing of homesteads, generally in dry stones
- Church bells, generally three elongated plates in phonolite or clinkstone, with different tonalities
- Milling stone: for this purpose plucked-bedrock pits, small rock-cut basins that naturally occur in rivers with kolks, are excavated from the river bed and further shaped. Milling is done at home using an elongated small boulder
- Door and window lintels, prepared from rock types that frequently have an elongated shape (sandstone, phonolite, limestone), or that are easily shaped (tufa)
- In the 1930s, soldiers of the Italian army (2nd "28th October" Blackshirt Division) left a monumental inscription in Dogu'a Tembien, a metres-wide phonolite with inscriptions. It is located at the top of the Dabba Selama mountain, and was carved by soldiers that participated in the First Battle of Tembien
- Troughs for livestock watering and feeding, generally hewn from tufa
- Footpath paving, generally done as community work. Some very ancient paved footpaths occur on major communication lines dating back to the period before the introduction of the automobile
- Heaped stones, in direct view of a church, where foot travellers stop, pray and put an additional stone
- Stones collected from farmlands in order to free space for the crop, and heaped in typical rounded metres-high heaps, called zala
- Contour bunding or gedeba: terrace walls in dry stone, typically laid out along the contour for sake of soil conservation
- Check dams or qetri in gullies for sake of gully erosion control
- Cobble stones, used for paving secondary streets in Hagere Selam. Generally limestone is used.

== Climate and hydrology ==
=== Climate and meteorology ===
Average annual precipitation (in Hagere Selam) is 778 mm. Mean temperature is 13.3 °C, oscillating between average daily minimum of 10.9 °C and maximum of 22 °C. As it is common at tropical latitudes, the contrasts between day and night air temperatures are much larger than seasonal contrasts. The rainfall pattern, however, shows a very high seasonality with 70 to 80% of the annual rain falling in July and August. The annual seasons are "hagay" (dry season in winter), "belgi" (spring rains), "kremti" (main summer rains) and "qew'i" (autumn), when the crops are ripening off. In the summer rainy season the dominant wind direction is from the southwest, whereas in the rest of the year winds blow from the east.

The farmers have adapted their cropping systems to this spatio-temporal variability in rainfall. Given the good chilling conditions, it is possible to grow apple at elevations above 2400 metres, such as in Dingilet or Mashih.

Climate models predict intensified summer rainfall in the future, but decreased spring rains.

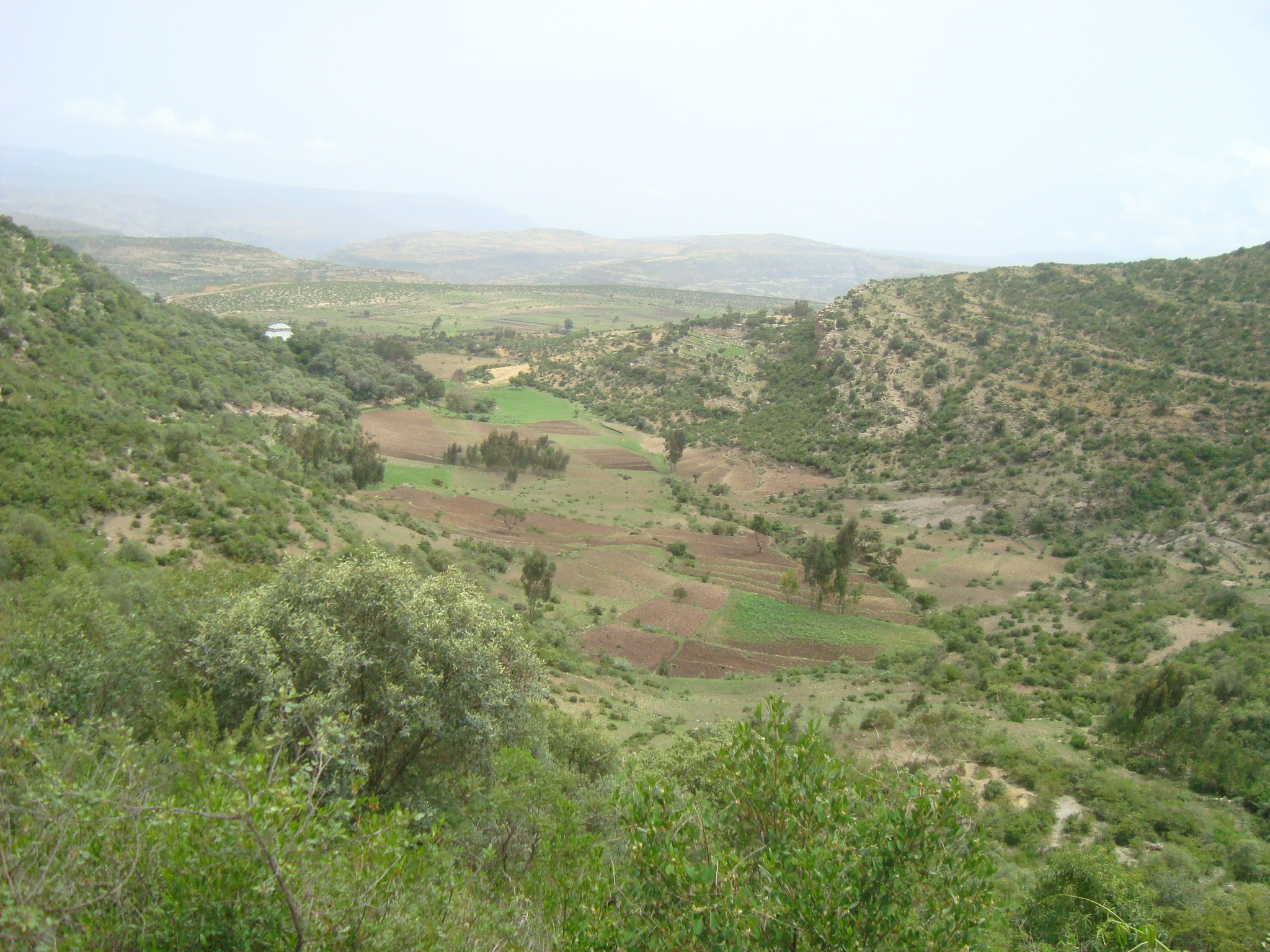
Mishlam's gully is no longer active because the catchment was reforested

=== Rivers ===
About three quarters of Dogu'a Tembien (800 km^{2}) drains to Giba River, and the remaining quarter (240 km^{2}) to the Weri'i River. The general drainage is westward, to the Tekezze River. Main tributaries in Dogu'a Tembien, from upstream to downstream, are

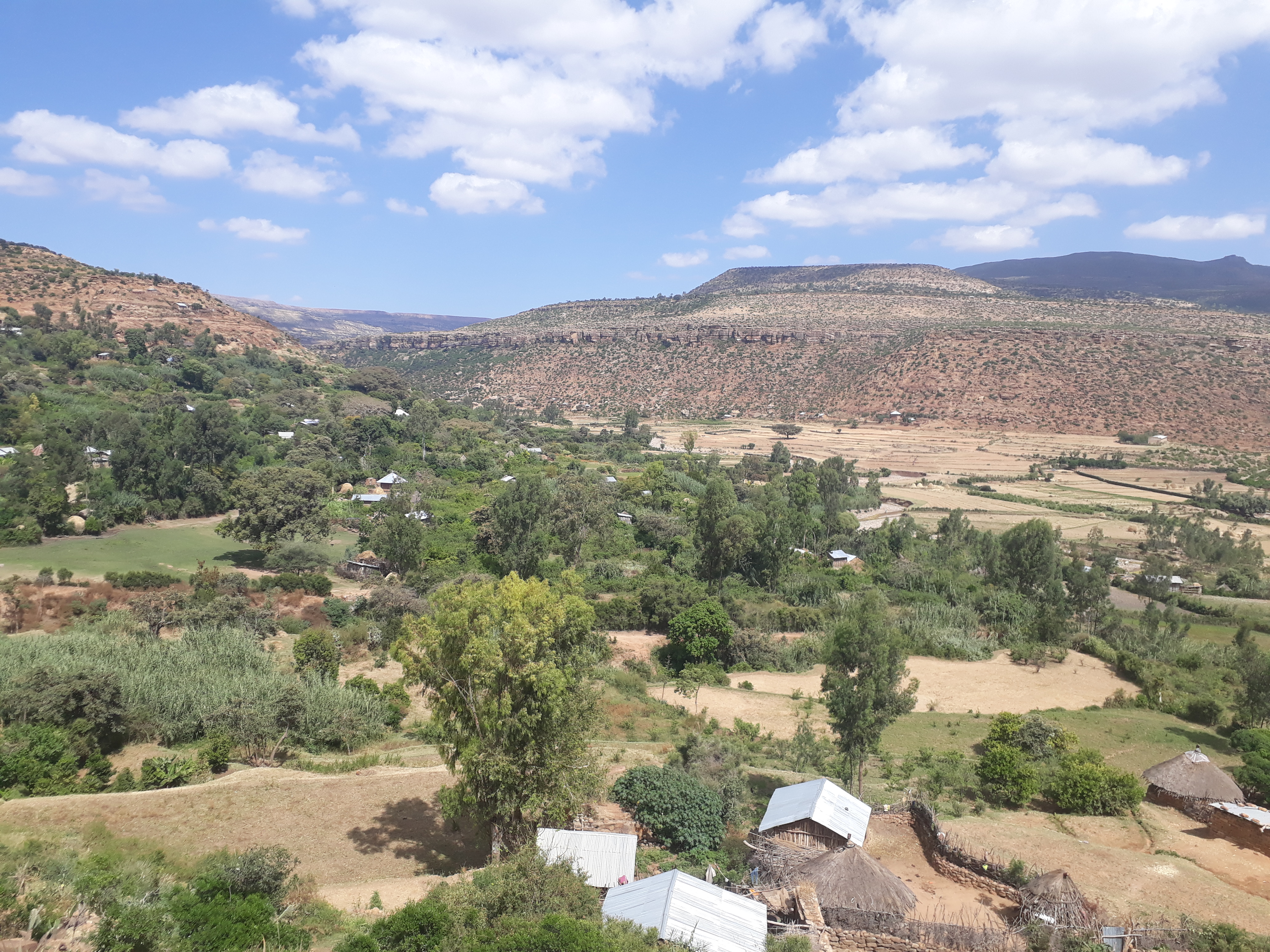
Rubaksa gardens

- Giba River
  - Ch'eqofo River, in tabia Addilal
  - Qarano River, at the border of tabias Addilal and Addi Azmera
  - Hurura River, in tabia Addi Azmera
    - May Ayni River, in tabia Addi Azmera
    - Afedena River, in tabia Addi Azmera
    - Shimbula River, in tabia Addi Azmera
  - Ruba Bich'i River, in tabia Addi Azmera
  - Inda Anbesa River, in tabia Debre Nazret
  - Addi Keshofo River, in tabia Amanit
  - Rubaksa River, in tabia Mika'el Abiy, which becomes Inda Sillasie River, at the border of Inda Sillasie and Amanit
    - May Zegzeg River, at border of tabias Ayninbirkekin and Mika'el Abiy
      - May Sho'ate River, at border of tabias Ayninbirkekin and Mika'el Abiy
      - May Harena, in tabia Mika'el Abiy
    - May Be'ati River, in tabia Ayninbirkekin
  - Gra Adiam River, which becomes Bitchoqo River, at the border of tabias Walta and Inda Sillasie
  - Zeyi River, at the border of tabias Simret and Walta
  - Zikuli River, in tabia Simret and Abergele (Ethiopian District)
  - May Selelo, in tabia Simret and Abergele (Ethiopian District)
  - Zeleqwa River, in tabias Melfa and Lim'at, which becomes Ruba Dirho in Aregen and Degol Woyane, and Tanqwa River, in the woredas Kola Tembien and Abergele (Ethiopian District)
    - Addi Selam River, in tabia Hagere Selam
    - Adawro River, in tabia Lim'at
    - Arwadito River, in tabia Lim'at
    - May Qoqah, in tabia Lim'at
    - Tsech'i River, in tabias Seret, Menachek and Aregen
- Weri'i River
  - Agefet River
    - Amblo River, in tabia Addi Walka
    - Azef River, at the border of tabias Addi Walka and Haddinnet
    - Ab'aro River, in tabia Haddinnet and woreda Kola Tembien
  - May Leiba, in tabia Ayninbirkekin, which becomes Tinsehe R. in Selam and Mahbere Sillasie, and Tsaliet River, downstream from the Dabba Selama monastery
    - Ferrey River, at the border of tabias Mahbere Sillasie and Degol Woyane
    - Kidane Mihret River, in tabia Mahbere Sillasie
    - May Meqa River, in tabia Selam
    - Graliwdo River, in tabia Ayninbirkekin

=== Karstic resurgences ===
At the lower part of the Antalo Limestone, where it lies on the Adigrat Sandstone, there are high discharge resurgences that drain the karst aquifer. The large resurgence in Rubaksa (13°35′N 39°14′E) irrigates an oasis in a dry limestone gorge. At Inda Mihtsun (13°33′N 39°21′E), the May Bilbil resurgence is inside the bed of the Giba River; in the dry season spring water surges through the baseflow of the river. Also in Ferrey, on the slopes of the Tsaliet gorge, resurgences allow to irrigate gardens with tropical fruits.

=== Reservoirs ===
In this area with rains that last only for a couple of months per year, reservoirs of different sizes allow harvesting runoff from the rainy season for further use in the dry season. Overall they suffer from siltation. Yet, they strongly contribute to greening the landscape, either through irrigation or seepage water. Main reservoirs are:

- Chini (reservoir), near Melfa, constructed in 1993
- May Leiba reservoir, in Ayninbirkekin tabia, constructed in 1998
- Lake Giba, a reservoir under construction on Giba river, mainly to provide water to Mekelle. This large lake, once established, will strongly impact the livelihood of the inhabitants of Emni Ankelalu tabia
- Smaller reservoirs (ponds), such as the one in the town of Hagere Selam, or in the village of Addi Qoylo
- Traditional surface water harvesting ponds, particularly in places without permanent springs, called rahaya
- Horoyo, household ponds, recently constructed through campaigns

== Environment ==
=== Soil ===
The soils of Dogu'a Tembien reflect its longstanding agricultural history, highly seasonal rainfall regime, relatively low temperatures, an extremely great variety in lithology (with dominance of basalts and limestone) and steep slopes. Outstanding features in the soilscape are the fertile highland Vertisols and Phaeozems in church forests. The reduced soil protection by vegetation cover, combined with steep slopes and erosive rainfall has led to excessive soil erosion. Nutrients and organic matter were lost and soil depth was reduced. Hence, soil erosion is an important problem, which results in low crop yields and biomass production. As a response to the strong degradation and thanks to the hard labour of many people in the villages, soil conservation has been carried out on a large scale since the 1980s; this has curbed rates of soil loss. Measures include the construction of infiltration trenches, stone bunds, check dams, small reservoirs such as Chini and May Leiba as well as a major biological measure: exclosures in order to allow forest regeneration. On the other hand, it remains difficult to convince farmers to carry out measures within the farmland (in situ soil management), such as bed and furrows or zero grazing, as there is a fear for loss of income from the land. Such techniques are however very effective.

=== Vegetation ===
==== Exclosures ====
The woreda holds several exclosures, areas that are set aside for regreening. Typical examples are:

- Adawro exclosure, near the village of Adawro
- Harehuwa exclosure, near the village of Harehuwa
- Khunale exclosure, near the village of Khunale

Wood harvesting and livestock range are not allowed there. Besides effects on biodiversity, water infiltration, protection from flooding, sediment deposition, carbon sequestration, people commonly have economic benefits from these exclosures through grass harvesting, beekeeping and other non-timber forest products. The local inhabitants also consider it as "land set aside for future generations". In Dogu'a Tembien, some exclosures are managed by the EthioTrees project. They have as an additional benefit that the villagers receive carbon credits for the sequestered CO_{2}, as part of a carbon offset programme. The revenues are then reinvested in the villages, according to the priorities of the communities; it may be for an additional class in the village school, a water pond, conservation in the exclosures, or a store for incense. The following exclosures are managed by the Ethiotrees project in Dogu'a Tembien:

- Addi Lihtsi, near the village of Addi Lihtsi (412 ha)
- Addi Meles, near the village of Migichi (65 ha)
- Addilal, near the village of Addilal (144.81 ha)
- Afedena, near the village of Afedena (70 ha)
- Ch'elaqo, near the village of Ch'elaqo (50 ha)
- Gemgema, near the village of Tsigaba (92 ha)
- Kidmi Gestet, near the village of Gestet (46 ha)
- Lafa, near the village of Lafa in Mizane Birhan municipality (45.25 ha)
- May Be'ati, near the village of May Be'ati (46 ha)
- Mi'am Atali, near the village of Mi'am Atali (83 ha)
- May Genet, near the village of May Genet (60 ha)
- May Hib'o, near the village of Addi Lihtsi (50 ha)
- Sesemat, near the village of Tahtay Sesemat (46 ha)
- Togogwa, near the village of Togogwa (196 ha)
- Tukhul, near the village of Tukhul, in Addi Azmera municipality (36 ha)
- Ziban Dake, near the village of Didiben (300 ha)
- Gojam Sfra, near the village of Migichi (275 ha)
- Katina Ruba, near the village of Didiben (48 ha)

=== Wildlife ===
==== Large mammals ====
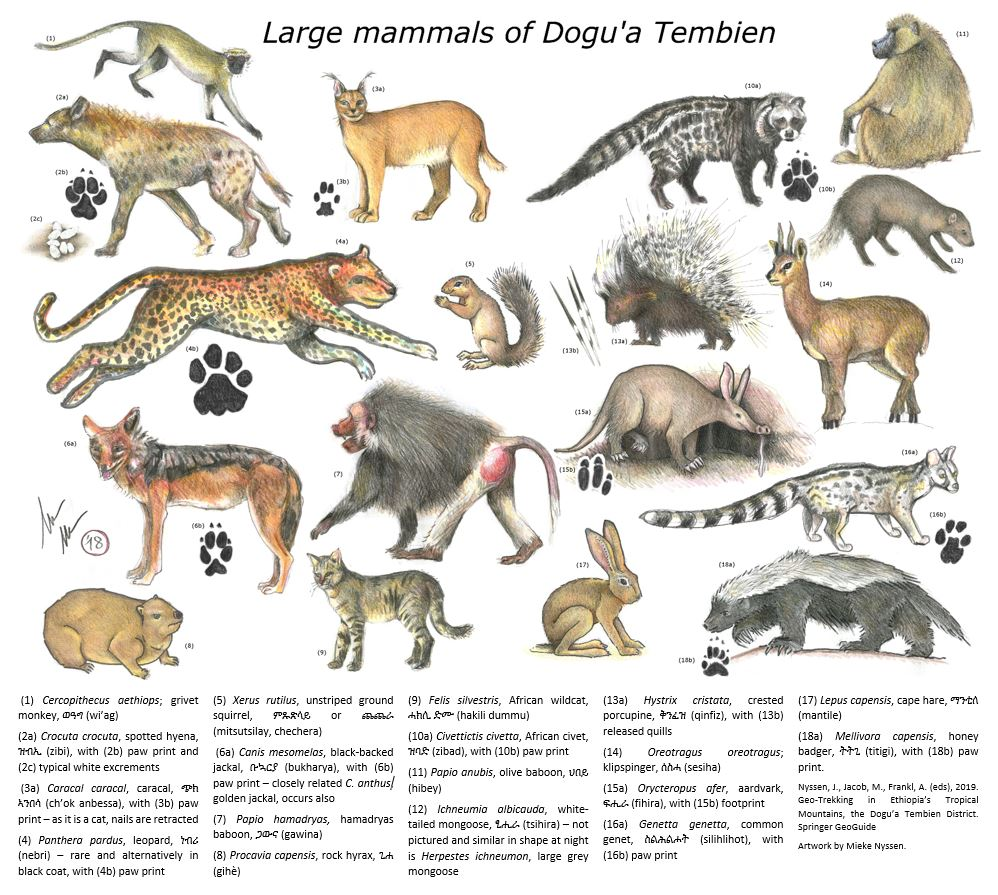

Large mammals of Dogu'a Tembien, with scientific (italics), English and Tigrinya language names. - Cercopithecus aethiops; grivet monkey, ወዓግ (wi'ag) - Crocuta crocuta, spotted hyena, ዝብኢ (zibi) - Caracal caracal, caracal, ጭክ ኣንበሳ (ch'ok anbessa) - Panthera pardus, leopard, ነብሪ (nebri) - Xerus rutilus, unstriped ground squirrel, ምጹጽላይ or ጨጨራ (mitsutsilay, chechera) - Canis mesomelas, black-backed jackal, ቡኳርያ (bukharya) - Canis anthus, golden jackal, ቡኳርያ (bukharya) - Papio hamadryas, hamadryas baboon, ጋውና (gawina) - Procavia capensis, rock hyrax, ጊሐ (gihè) - Felis silvestris, African wildcat, ሓክሊ ድሙ (hakili dummu) - Civettictis civetta, African civet, ዝባድ (zibad) - Papio anubis, olive baboon, ህበይ (hibey) - Ichneumia albicauda, white-tailed mongoose, ፂሒራ (tsihira) - Herpestes ichneumon, large grey mongoose, ፂሒራ (tsihira) - Hystrix cristata, crested porcupine, ቅንፈዝ (qinfiz) - Oreotragus oreotragus; klipspringer, ሰስሓ (sesiha) - Orycteropus afer, aardvark, ፍሒራ (fihira) - Genetta genetta, common genet, ስልሕልሖት (silihlihot) - Lepus capensis, cape hare, ማንቲለ (mantile) - Mellivora capensis, honey badger, ትትጊ (titigi)

==== Small rodents ====
The most common pest rodents with widespread distribution in agricultural fields and storage areas in Dogu'a Tembien (and in Tigray) are three Ethiopian endemic species: the Dembea grass rat (Arvicanthis dembeensis, sometimes considered a subspecies of Arvicanthis niloticus), Ethiopian white-footed rat (Stenocephalemys albipes), and Awash multimammate mouse (Mastomys awashensis).

==== Bats ====
Bats occur in natural caves, church buildings and abandoned homesteads. The large colony of bats that roosts in Zeyi cave comprises Hipposideros megalotis (Ethiopian large-eared roundleaf bat), Hipposideros tephrus, and Rhinolophus blasii (Blasius's horseshoe bat).

==== Birds ====
With its numerous exclosures, forest fragments and church forests, Dogu'a Tembien is a birdwatcher's paradise. Detailed inventories list at least 170 bird species, including numerous endemic species.

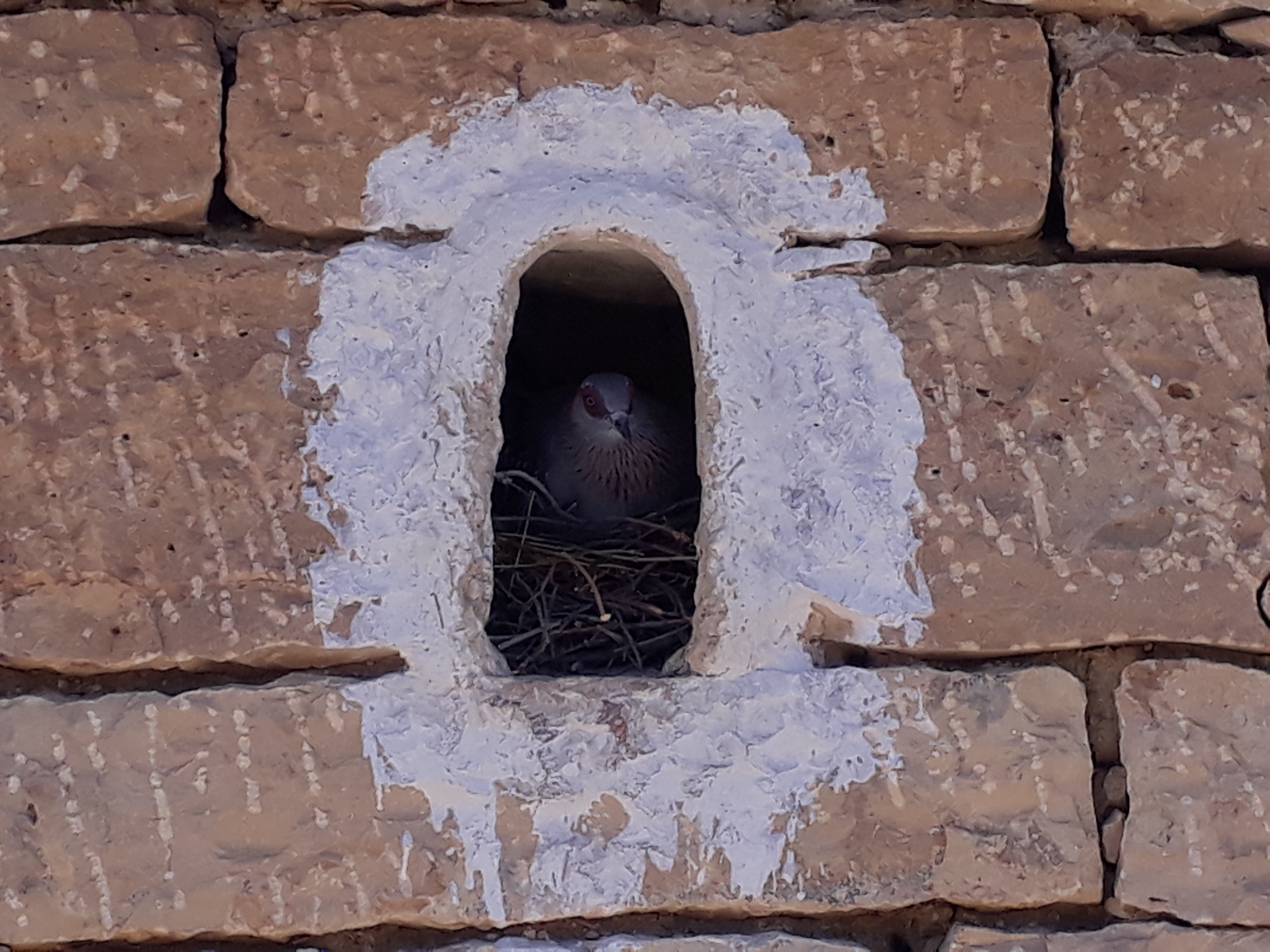
Nest box for Columba guinea in the wall of a homestead in Zerfenti

Species belonging to the Afrotropical Highland Biome occur in the dry evergreen montane forests of the highland plateau but can also occupy other habitats. Wattled Ibis can be found feeding in wet grassland and open woodland. Black-winged Lovebird, Banded Barbet, Golden-mantled or Abyssinian Woodpecker, Montane White-eye, Rüppell's Robin-chat, Abyssinian Slaty Flycatcher and Tacazze Sunbird are found in evergreen forest, mountain woodlands and areas with scattered trees including fig trees, Euphorbia abyssinica and Juniperus procera. Erckel's spurfowl, Dusky Turtle Dove, Swainson's or Grey-headed Sparrow, Baglafecht Weaver, African Citril, Brown-rumped Seedeater and Streaky Seedeater are common Afrotropical breeding residents of woodland edges, scrubland and forest edges. White-billed Starling and Little Rock Thrush can be found on steep cliffs; Speckled or African rock pigeon and White-collared Pigeon in gorges and rocky places but also in towns and villages.

Species belonging to the Somali-Masai Biome. Hemprich's Hornbill and White-rumped Babbler are found in bushland, scrubland and dense secondary forest, often near cliffs, gorges or water. Chestnut-Winged or Somali Starling and Rüppell's Weaver are found in bushy and shrubby areas. Black-billed wood hoopoe has some red at the base of the bill or an entirely red bill in this area.

Species belonging to the Sudan-Guinea Savanna Biome: Green-backed eremomela and Chestnut-crowned Sparrow-Weaver.

Species that are neither endemic nor biome-restricted but that have restricted ranges or that can be more easily seen in Ethiopia than elsewhere in their range: Abyssinian Roller is an Ethiopian relative of Lilac-breasted Roller, which is an intra-tropical breeding migrant of south and east Africa, and of European Roller, an uncommon Palearctic passage migrant. Black-billed Barbet, Yellow-breasted Barbet and Grey-headed Batis are species from the Sahel and Northern Africa but also occur in Acacia woodlands in the area.

The most regularly observed raptor birds in crop fields in Dogu'a Tembien are Augur buzzard (Buteo augur), Common Buzzard (Buteo buteo), Steppe Eagle (Aquila nipalensis), Lanner falcon (Falco biarmicus), Black kite (Milvus migrans), Yellow-billed kite (Milvus aegyptius) and Barn owl (Tyto alba).

Birdwatching can be done particularly in exclosures and forests. Eighteen bird-watching sites have been inventoried and mapped.

== Agriculture ==
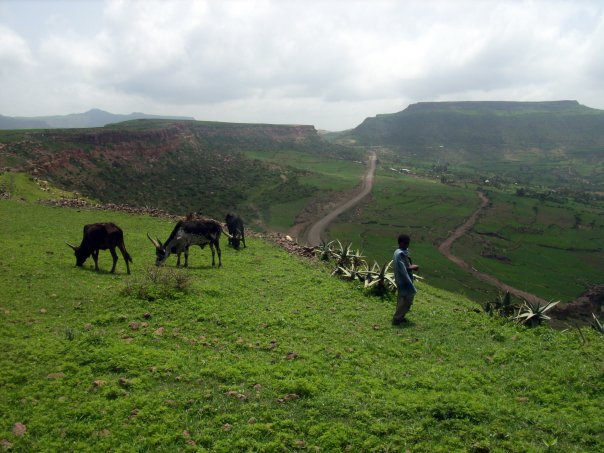
Highlands (Guyeha ridge) and road in Ayninbirkekin tabia or municipality. At the back Imba Ra'isot mountain

=== Agricultural system ===
The farmlands are clearly demarcated and are cropped every year. Hence the agricultural system is a permanent upland farming system, and the population are not nomads. In 2001, 72% of the farmers both raised crops and livestock, while 28% only grew crops; very few to none only raised livestock. The term mixed farming is inappropriate however; it is rather a grain-plough complex. The first role of livestock is to support cropping.

=== Cropping ===
A sample enumeration performed by the CSA in 2001 interviewed 22,002 farmers in this woreda, who held an average of 0.79 hectares of land. Of the 17,387 hectares of private land surveyed, 91% was in cultivation, 0.6% pasture, 5% fallow, 0.13% woodland, and 3% was devoted to other uses. For the land under cultivation in this woreda, 78% was planted in cereals, 12% in pulses, and 1.4% in oilseeds; the area planted in vegetables is missing. Ten hectares were planted in fruit trees and eleven in gesho. Land tenure in this woreda is distributed amongst 82% owning their land, 17% renting and 0.4% holding their land under other forms of tenure.

=== Livestock ===
==== Importance of livestock ====
Livestock are in the first place cattle (especially oxen) and also goats, sheep, donkeys, mules and a lonely horse. An average family owns one or two oxen (six or eight for a rich family), one to three cows with their calf(s) (ten), 5 to 7 goats or sheep (20 or 30), and sometimes a donkey (three or four mules and donkeys for a rich family). Livestock are mainly a source of energy, hence they are part of the permanent farming system: oxen are ploughing and threshing and thus essential for crop production. Donkeys provide energy: they transport heavy loads such as crop harvests, large stones for building, and traded goods. Additionally, sheep and goats are considered as an insurance for difficult times. Meat and milk production are only of secondary importance. All in all, livestock productivity is low as there are shortages of fodder (crop residues). No forage crops are grown, livestock access all fallow land and harvested cropland for stubble grazing.

==== Cattle races ====
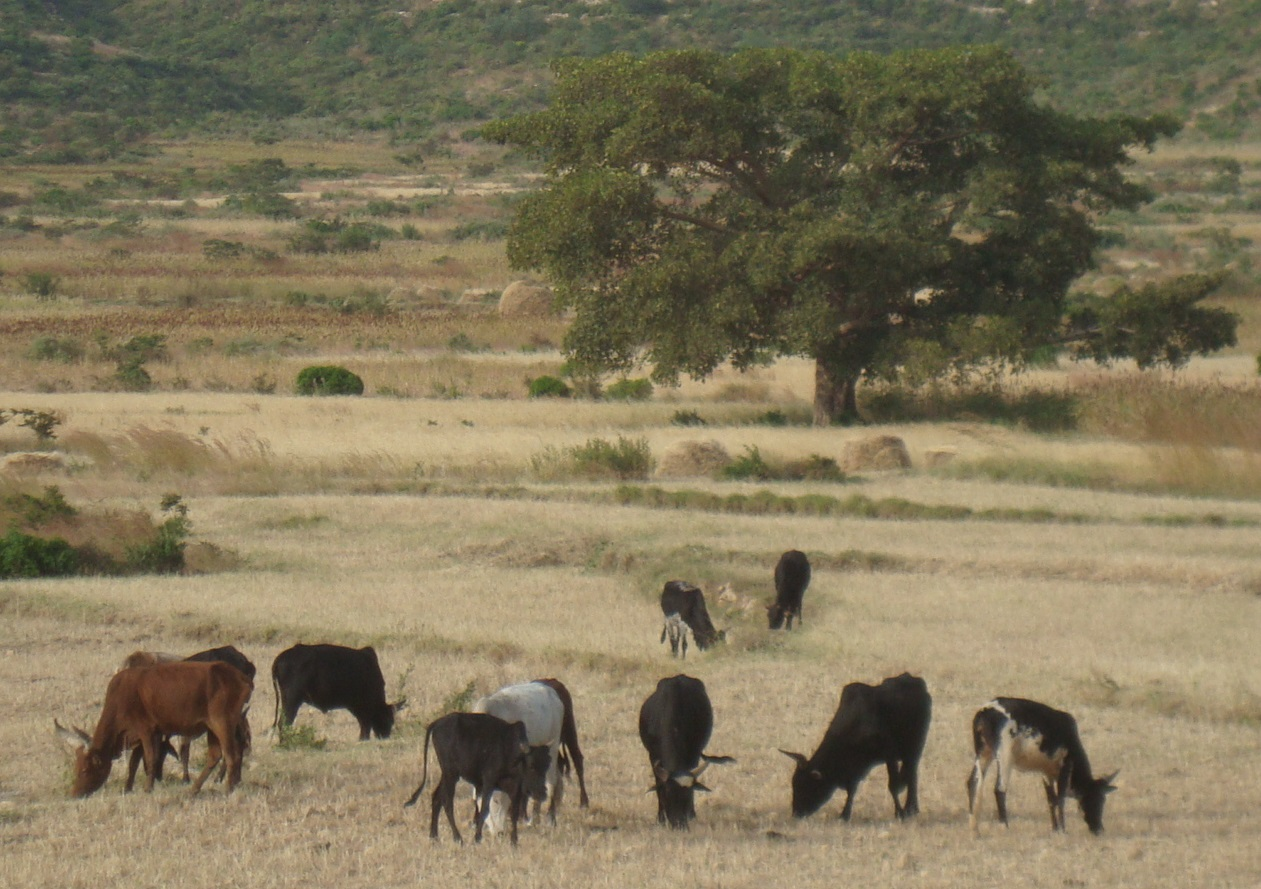
Arado cattle in aftermath grazing in May Genet

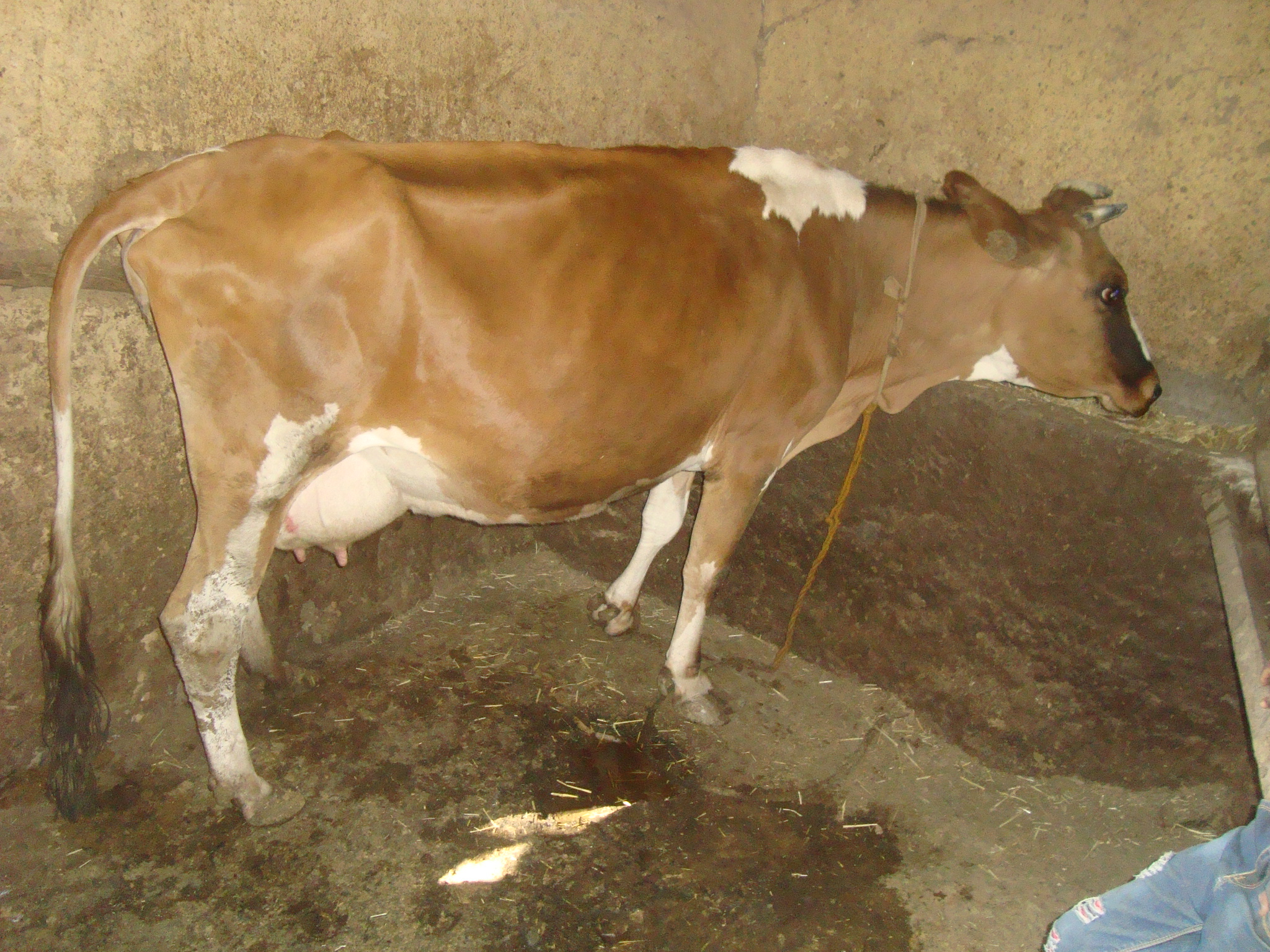
Crossbred Arado x Holstein-Friesian milk cow in Hagere Selam town

Mainly used for draught, there are several cattle landraces in Dogu'a Tembien.

- Arado cattle, the widely dominant variety
- Long-horned Raya oxen, purchased from Southern Tigray
- Abergele cattle, on the southwestern slopes of Dogu'a Tembien. They are more common in Abergele (Ethiopian District)
- In Hagere Selam and other small towns: Cross-bred Arado x Begayt, and Arado x Holstein-Friesian milk cows

==== Transhumance in the cropping season ====
During the cropping season the lands around the villages are not accessible for grazing. Livestock owners have three alternatives:

- annual transhumance, particularly towards remote and vast grazing grounds
- daily movements with livestock back-and-forth to the grazing grounds, the "home range herders" – they travel back and forth daily to grazing grounds that are a few kilometres away
- keeping livestock nearby to the homesteads In some villages most people with not practice transhumance, but even in villages which practice transhumance, some will prefer using the nearby grazing grounds.

If the grazing lands are far from the village, deep in the gorge, livestock will stay there overnight (transhumance) with children and a few adults keeping them. Some examples:

- The cattle of Addi Geza'iti (2580 m) are brought every rainy season to the gorge of River Tsaliet (1930 m) that holds dense vegetation. The cattle keepers establish enclosures for the cattle and places for them to sleep, often in rock shelters. The cattle stay there until harvesting time, when they are needed for threshing, and when the stubble becomes available for grazing.
- Many cattle of Haddinnet and also Ayninbirkekin tabias are brought to the foot of the escarpment at Ab'aro, with all herds passing through Ksad Azef pass. Cattle stay on there on wide rangelands. Some cattle keepers move far down to open woodland and establish their camp in large caves in sandstone.
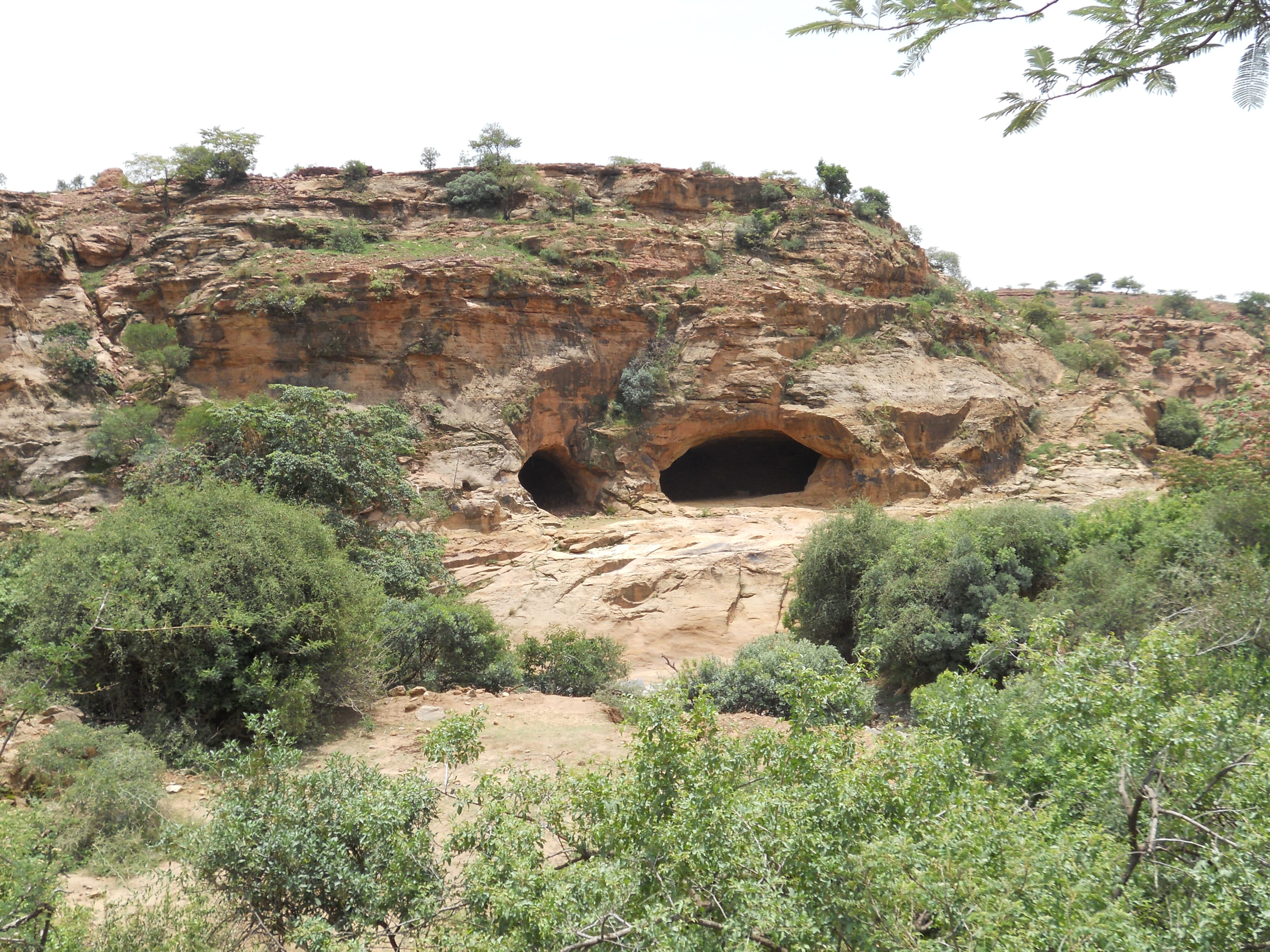
  The "red caves" or Kayeh Be'ati in Adigrat Sandstone, a preferred destination for transhumance

=== Off-farm income ===
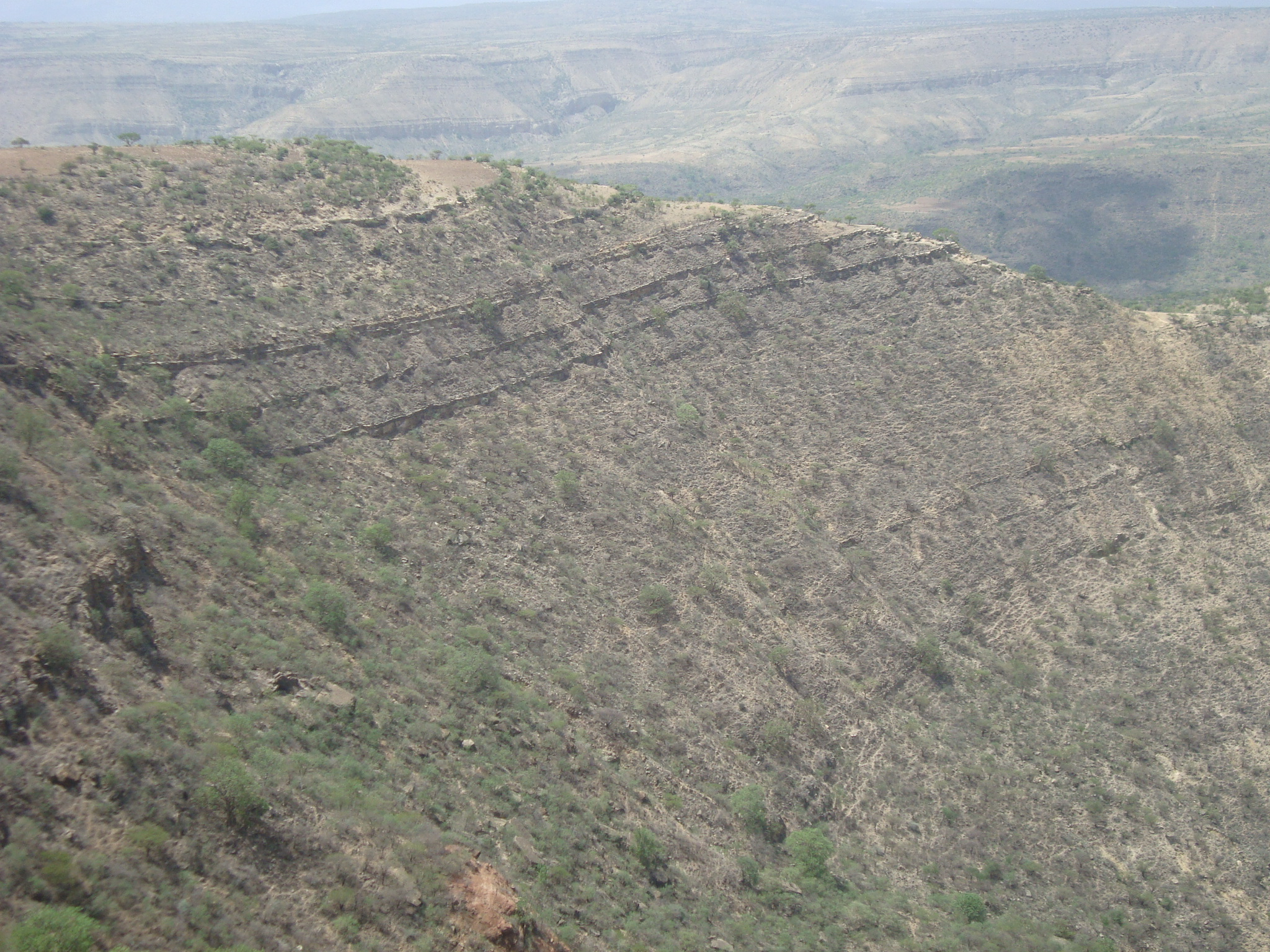
Slopes of the Giba gorge at Addi Lihtsi, with incense trees

In the Giba River gorge, the peasants care seasonally for communal incense trees (Boswellia papyrifera). This is a landscape that has been created by close to a hundred generations of peasants for the production of incense. This was already exported to the sea ports and to pharaonic Egypt, and later to ancient Rome.

Rural youngsters seasonally migrate also to the uninhabited Weri'i River area, to wash gold out of the sediments.

Additional activities to assure income include trading and daily labour in Hagere Selam, internal migration in the dry season and (until the recent past) salt trade.

The traditional farmers' homesteads are maybe not luxurious but evidence a quality of life.

== Schools ==
There are about 70 schools in the woreda. They include:

Hagere Selam

- Addi Selam TVET (technical and vocational school)
- Hagere Selam High School

Degol Woyane

- Atse Yohannes School

Debre Nazret

- Togogwa High School
- Kolal school

Mahbere Sillasie

Selam

Mika'el Abiy

Seret

- Mashih school

Melfa

- May Sa'iri school

Addi Azmera

- Afedena school

Ayninbirkekin

- Ra'isot school

Emni Ankelalu

Mizan

Amanit

- Amanit school

== Churches and monasteries ==
As of 2013, 100 church institutions were registered in the woreda. Churches and monasteries in the woreda that contain historical manuscripts and artefacts include:

- Qorrar Däbrä Mädḫanit Qǝddǝst Maryam gädam
- Kunale ʾArbaʿtu ʾƎnsǝsa
- Tänsǝḥe Kidanä Mǝḥrät gädam
- Tägoga Däbrä Nazret Kidanä Mǝḥrät gädam
- ʾAräbay Qǝddus Mikaʾel
- May Bäʿatti Däbrä Gännät ʾArbaʿtu ʾƎnsǝsa
- ʾAlʿasa Qǝddus Mikaʾel
- Qäqäma Qǝddǝst Maryam Däbrä Gännät gädam
- Zala ʾƎnda ʾAmanuʾel gädam
- Rubaḵusa Qǝddus Giyorgis gädam

== Rural sociology ==
=== Cattle ownership ===
Cattle, and particularly oxen, traditionally have social, economic and insurance value. This has contributed to wealth differentiation, structuring debts and management of the households.

=== Gendered division of labour ===
The ox-plough based agriculture, which has characterised Dogu'a Tembien since thousands of years, not only has shaped the agricultural landscape; it also forms the basis of social relationships. There is for instance a gendered division of labour, as women are traditionally focussed on weeding and harvesting, as well as activities at home, and men work in the fields at ploughing and threshing times. Ploughing by women has been (and often still is) a cultural taboo.

== Culture ==
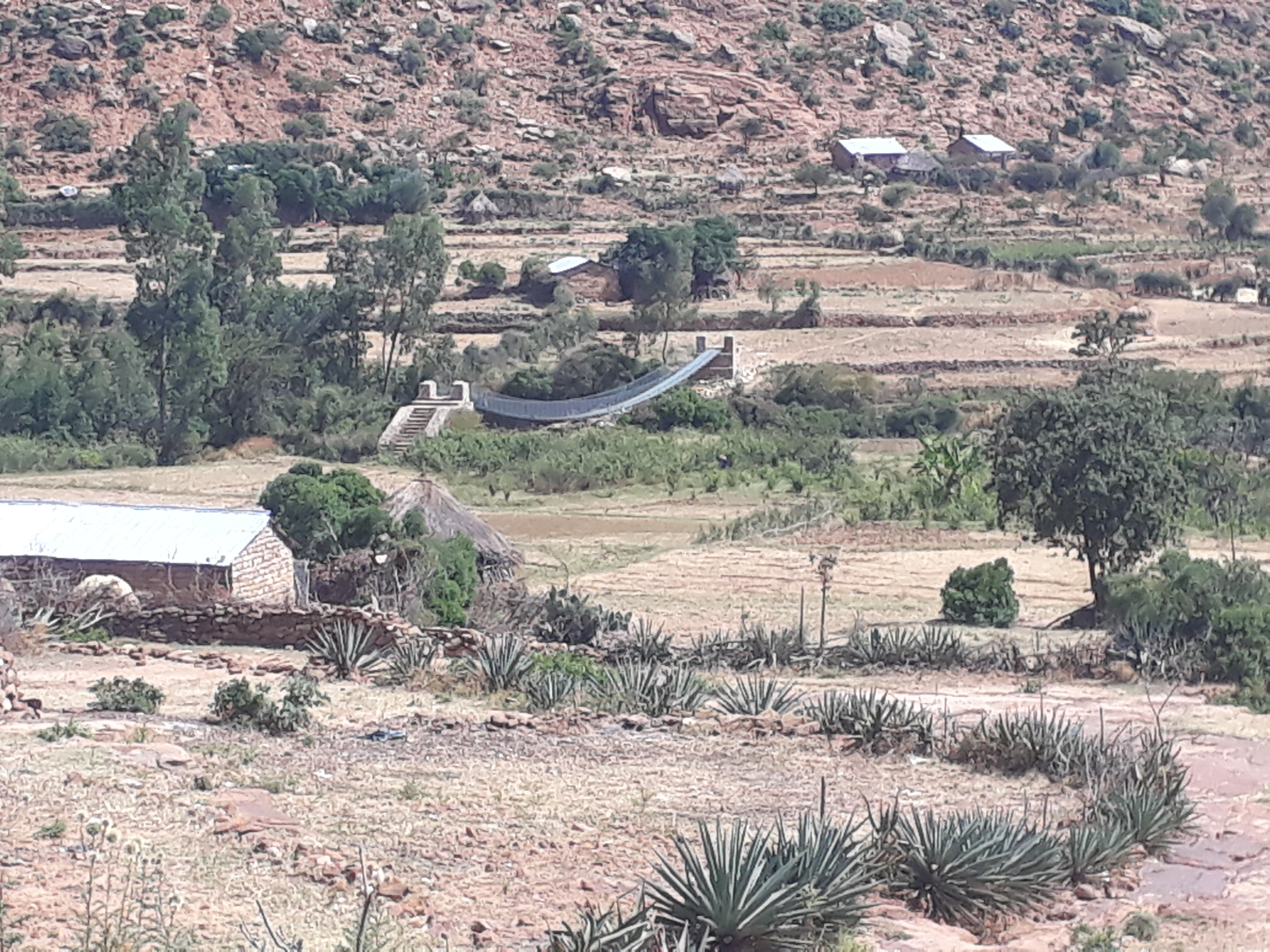
Rubaksa footbridge on trekking route 16

=== Music and festivals ===
- Just like Kola Tembien, Dogu'a Tembien is known for the frenetic Awrus dancing style
- Yearly there is the girls' festival Ashenda. Then, young women dominate the public space with dances and songs which is in strong contrast with the rest of the year. The rural Ashenda is very different from the "standardised" urban festival.
- Also in summer, there is the boys' festival Hawariat, where they clack whips. This lasts for about a week.

=== The Siwa local beer culture ===
In almost every household of Dogu'a Tembien, the woman knows how to prepare the local beer, siwa. Ingredients are water, a home-baked and toasted flat bread commonly made from barley in the highlands, and from sorghum, finger millet or maize in the lower areas, some yeast (Saccharomyces cerevisiae), and dried leaves of gesho (Rhamnus prinoides) that serve as a catalyser. The brew is allowed to ferment for a few days, after which it is served, sometimes with the pieces of bread floating on it (the customer will gently blow them to one side of the beaker). The alcoholic content is 2% to 5%. Most of the coarser part of the brew, the atella, remains back and is used as cattle feed.

Siwa is consumed during social events, after (manual) work, and as an incentive for farmers and labourers. There are about a hundred traditional beer houses (Inda Siwa), often in unique settings, all across Dogu'a Tembien.

== Tourism ==
Hotspots for domestic tourism are the Dabba Selama and Dabba Hadera monasteries as well as the Addi Geza'iti man-made cave that was used as TPLF headquarters during the Ethiopian civil war; geo-tourism is developing. Touristic attractions, potential for geotourism and trekking are detailed in the articles related to municipalities of Dogu'a Tembien.

== Surrounding woredas ==
Dogu'a Tembien is bordered on the south by the Saharti Samre woreda, on the west by Abergele, on the northwest by Kola Tembien, on the north by Hawzen (Ethiopian District), on the northeast by Kilte Awulaelo and on the east by Inderta.

== Gallery ==
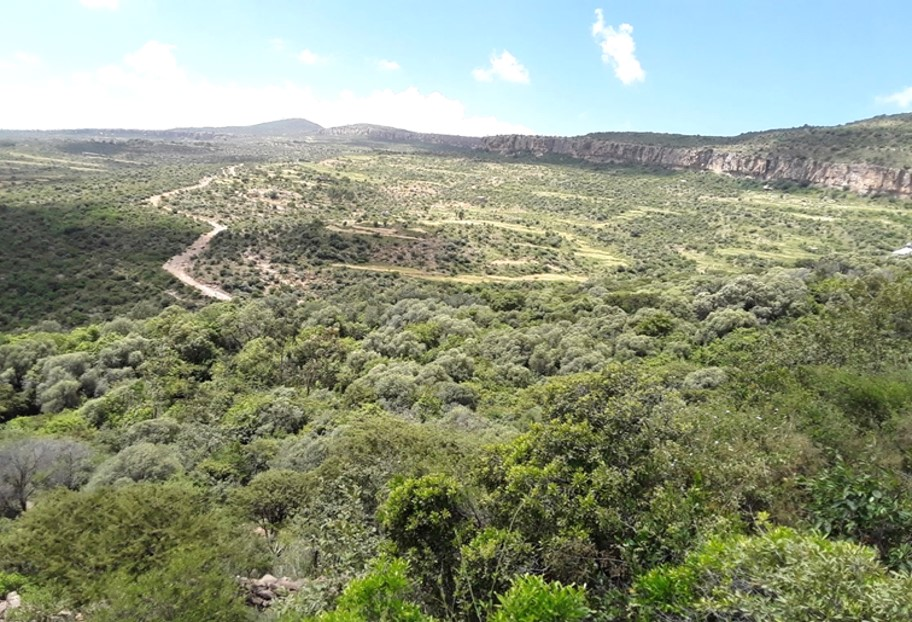
Togogwa forest.

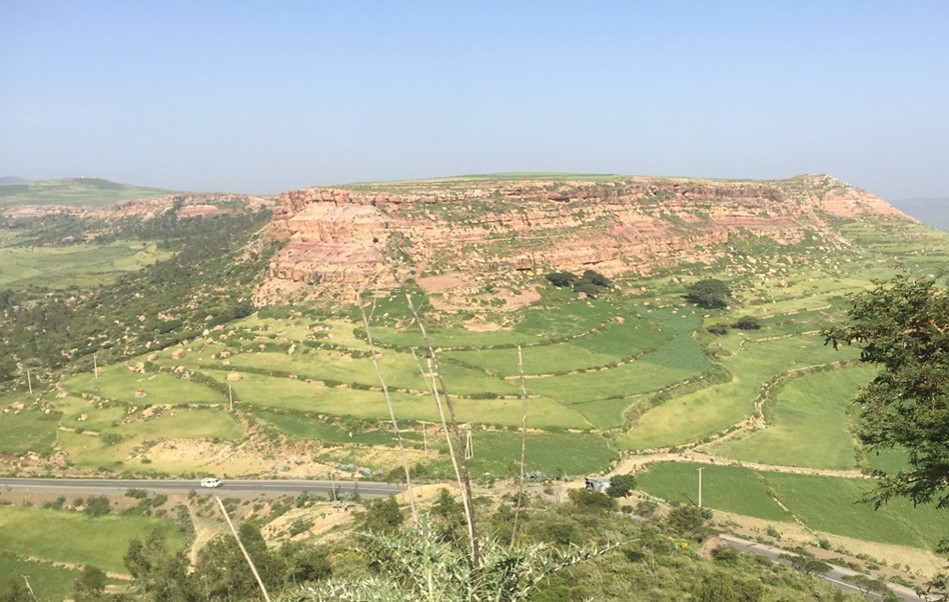
View on Ksad Halah.

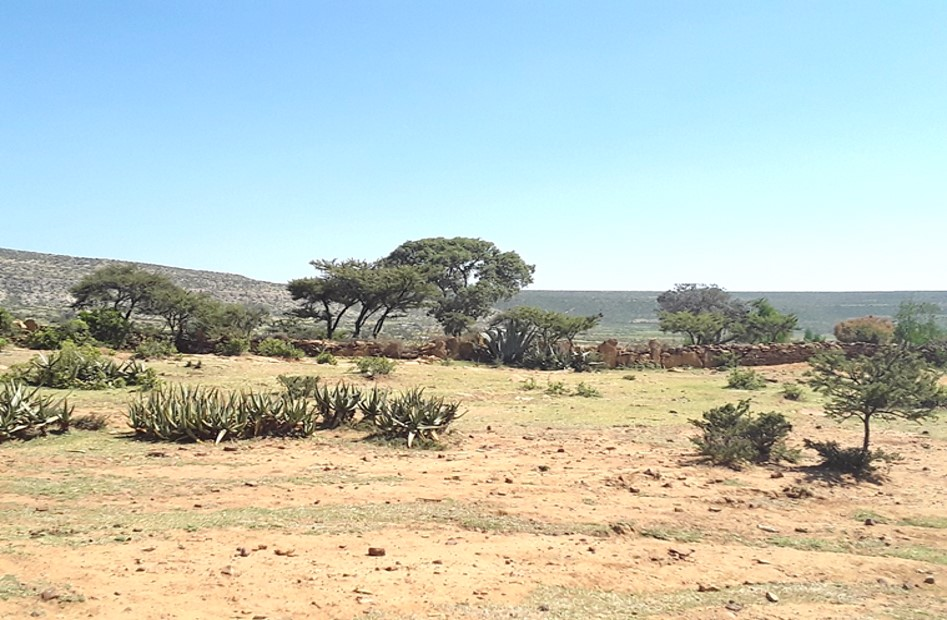
Fato (central grazing place) in May Genet.

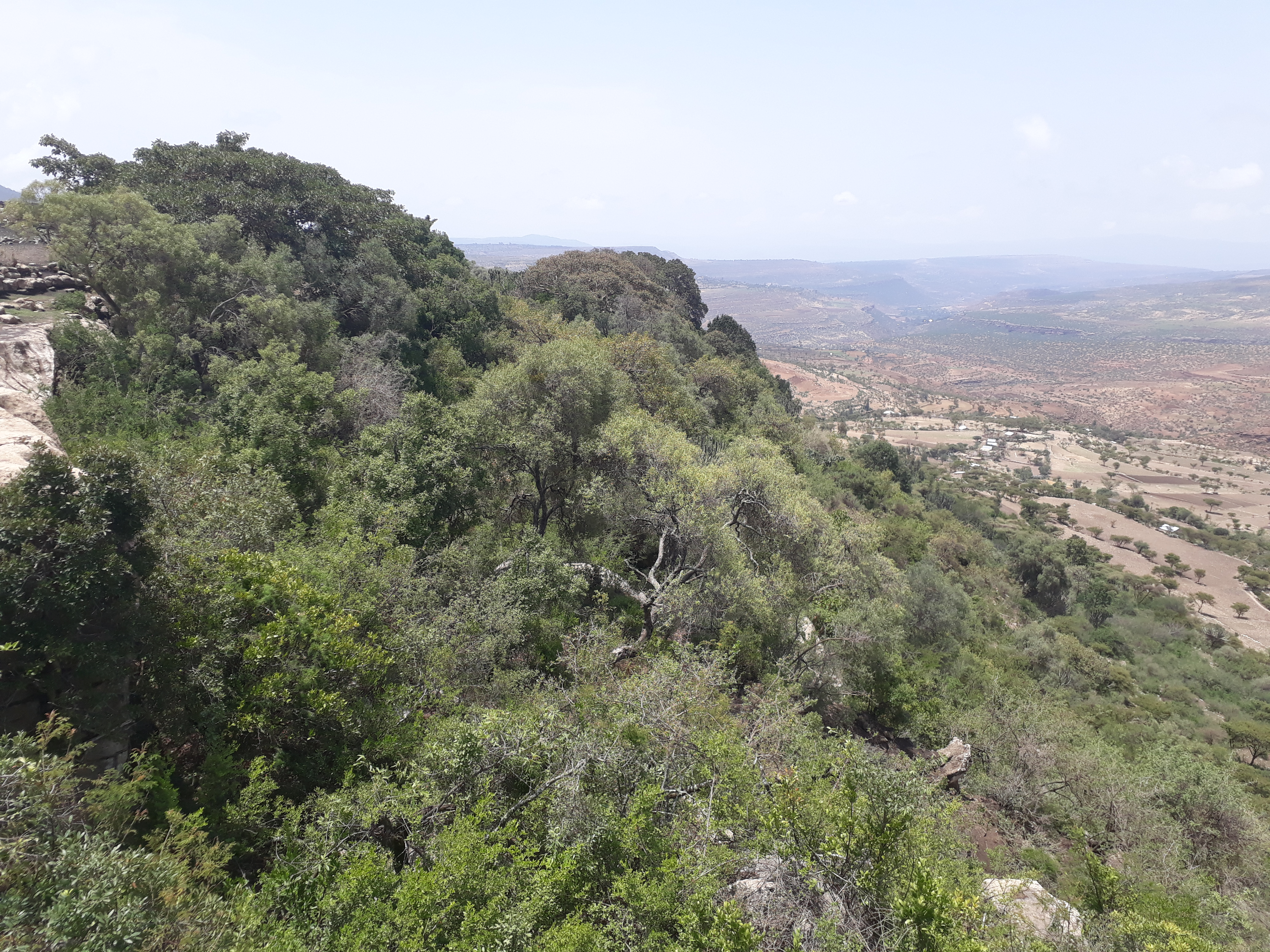
May Be'ati church forest.
