= Arebay =

Municipality in Ethiopia

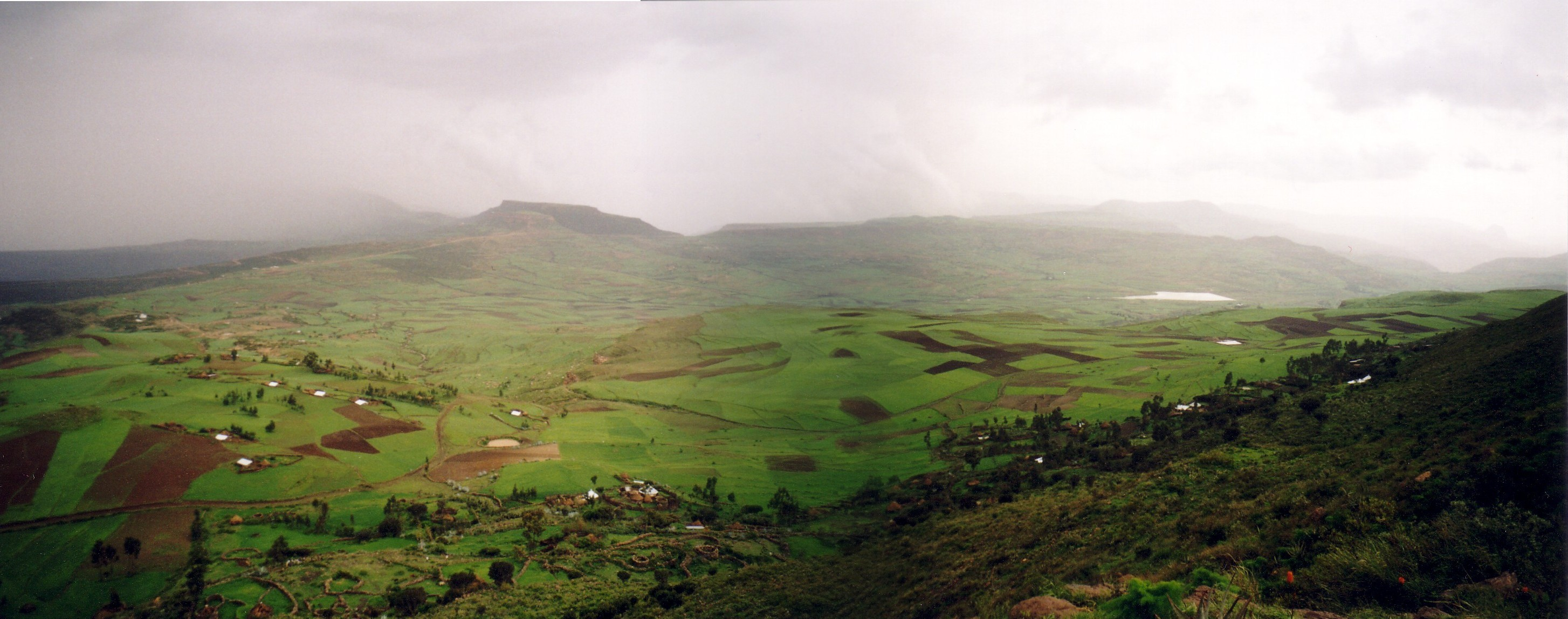
- Southern part of Arebay, as seen from Ekli Imba

- Location within Ethiopia
- Coordinates: 13°43′N 39°17′E
- Country: Ethiopia
- Region: Tigray
- Zone: Debub Misraqawi (Southeastern)
- Woreda: Dogu'a Tembien

Area
  - Total: 20.21 km^{2} (7.80 sq mi)
- Elevation: 2,630 m (8,630 ft)
- Time zone: UTC+3 (EAT)

Arebay is a tabia or municipality in the Dogu'a Tembien district of the Tigray Region of Ethiopia organised around the Arebay mountain peaks (2799 m). The tabia centre is in Arebay village, located approximately 13 km to the east-northeast of the woreda town Hagere Selam.

== Geography ==
The tabia occupies a high position around the Arebay peaks Ekli Imba, Medayq and Addi Shumbolo. The highest peak is 2799 m a.s.l. and the lowest place at the northeast (2150 m a.s.l.).

=== Geology and soils ===
==== Geological formations ====
From the higher to the lower locations, the following geological formations are present:

- Upper basalt
- Interbedded lacustrine deposits
- Lower basalt
- Amba Aradam Formation
- Agula Shale
- Mekelle Dolerite

==== Soil types ====
From Ekli Imba down to the cliff that marks the boundary to Ayninbirkekin, “red-black” Skeletic Cambisol–Pellic Vertisol catenas occur on basalt.

=== Climate ===
The rainfall pattern shows a very high seasonality with 70 to 80% of the annual rain falling in July and August. Mean temperature in Arebay is 17.2 °C, oscillating between average daily minimum of 9.5 °C and maximum of 24.6 °C. The contrasts between day and night air temperatures are much larger than seasonal contrasts.

=== Springs ===
As there are no permanent rivers, the presence of springs is of utmost importance for the local people. The main springs in the tabia are:

- May Deqqi Sa’iri
- Addi Amdey

=== Reservoirs ===
In this area with rains that last only for a couple of months per year, reservoirs of different sizes allow harvesting runoff from the rainy season for further use in the dry season. Overall they suffer from siltation. Yet, they strongly contribute to greening the landscape, either through irrigation or seepage water. Main reservoirs are:

- May Leiba reservoir, in Ayninbirkekin tabia; it intercepts the runoff from the southern half of Arebay
- Traditional surface water harvesting ponds, particularly in places without permanent springs, called rahaya
- Horoyo, household ponds, recently constructed through campaigns

=== Settlements ===
The tabia centre Arebay holds a few administrative offices, a health post, a primary school, and some small shops. There are a few more primary schools across the tabia. The main other populated places are:

- Medayq
- Addi Amdey
- Harhar
- Ts’arot

== Agriculture and livelihood ==
The population lives essentially from crop farming, supplemented with off-season work in nearby towns. The land is dominated by farmlands which are clearly demarcated and are cropped every year. Hence the agricultural system is a permanent upland farming system. The farmers have adapted their cropping systems to the spatio-temporal variability in rainfall.

== History and culture ==
=== History ===
The history of the tabia is strongly confounded with the history of Tembien.

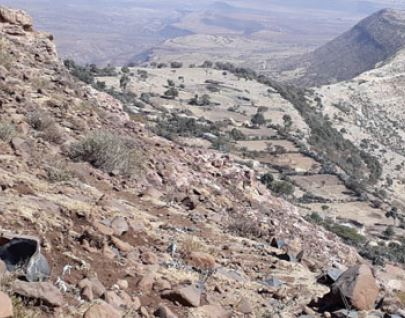
Ch’erkos church forest

=== Religion and churches ===
Most inhabitants are Orthodox Christians. The following churches are located in the tabia:

- Mika’el
- Giyergis
- Addi Amdey Maryam
- Ts’arot Ch’erkos

=== Inda Siwa, the local beer houses ===
In the main villages, there are traditional beer houses (Inda Siwa), often in unique settings, which are a good place for resting and chatting with the local people. The most renown ones are in the tabia centre Arebay: Haleqa Abraha Tefere, Atakilti Gebremedhin and Hagos Gebremeskel.

== Roads and communication ==
The main road Mekelle – Hagere Selam – Abiy Addi runs some 5 km south, and down, of the tabia. There are regular bus services to these towns. Further, a mountain access road links most villages to the main asphalt road.

== Tourism ==
Its mountainous nature and proximity to Mekelle makes the tabia fit for tourism. The high variability of geological formations and the rugged topography invites for geological and geographic tourism or "geotourism".

=== Touristic attractions ===
- Mountain peaks with astonishing views (up to Simien, Adwa, Mugulat Mt. (near Adigrat) and Imba Alaje)
- Springs high up on the mountain

=== Birdwatching ===
Birdwatching (for the species, see the main Dogu'a Tembien page) can be done particularly in exclosures and forests. The Maryam Addi Amdey church forest is recommended.

=== Trekking routes ===
Trekking routes have been established in this tabia. The tracks are not marked on the ground but can be followed using downloaded .GPX files.

- Trek 23, en east–west ridge trek across Dogu'a Tembien, passes over Arebay's peaks
- Trek 26, links the main road in Ala’isa to the Ekli Imba peak

=== Accommodation and facilities ===
The facilities are very basic. One may be invited to spend the night in a rural homestead or ask permission to pitch a tent. Hotels are available in Hagere Selam and Mekelle.

== More detailed information ==
For more details on environment, agriculture, rural sociology, hydrology, ecology, culture, etc., see the overall page on the Dogu'a Tembien district.
