= Tanqua Millash =

District in Tigray Region, Ethiopia

Tanqua Millash ጣንቋ ምላሽ
- Woreda
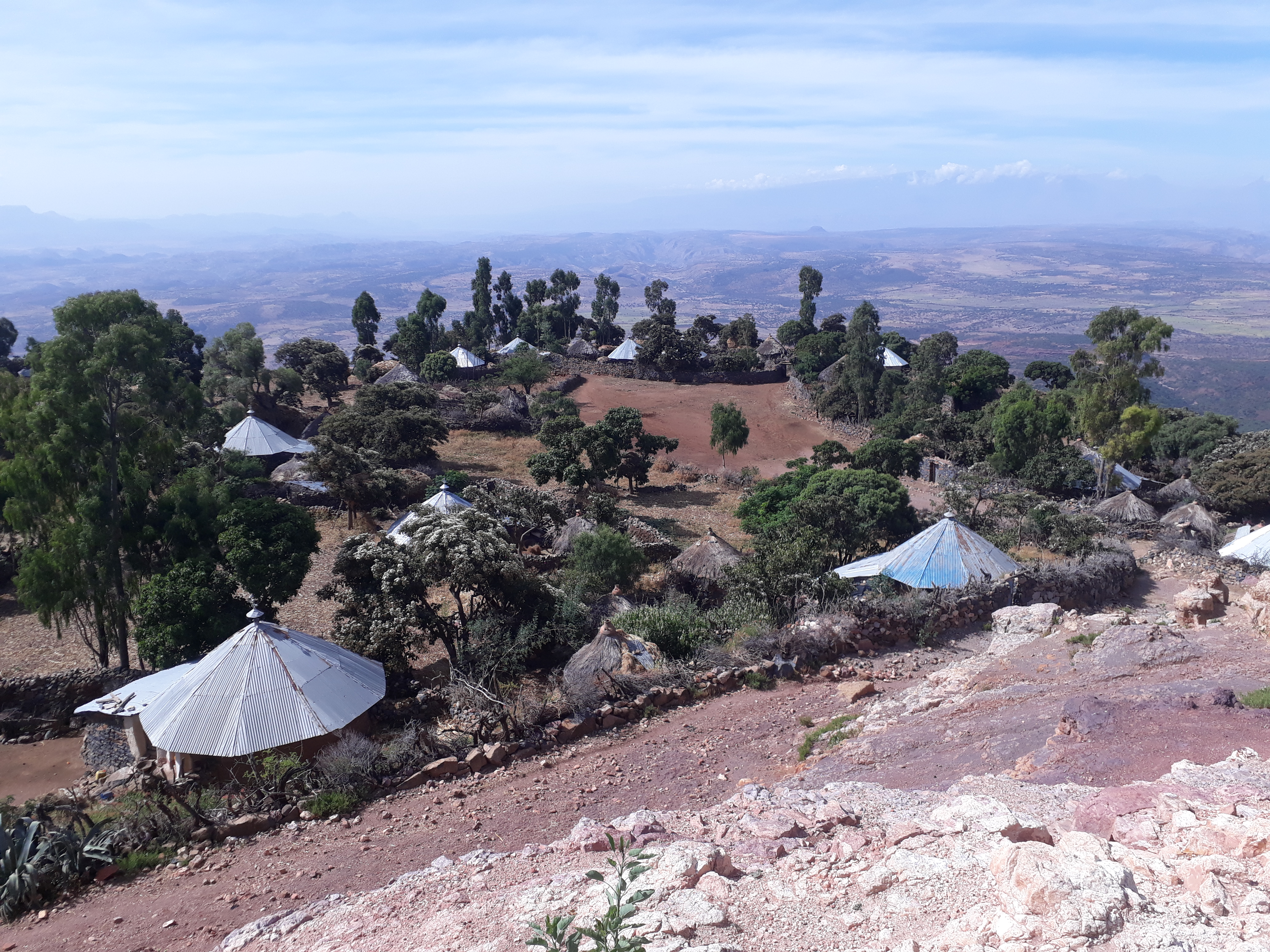
- Santarfa village overlooks Tanqua Millash
- Interactive map of Tanqua Millash
- Coordinates: 13°33′N 39°3′E
- Country: Ethiopia
- Region: Tigray
- Zone: Central Tigray

Tanqua Millash (Tigrinya: ጣንቋ ምላሽ) is a woreda in the Tigray Region of Ethiopia. Located in the Central Tigray zone, Tanqua Millash was created from parts of the Tanqua Abergelle and Dogu’a Tembien in 2020. Agbe is the capital of this district.

== Geography ==
The literal translation of Tanqua Millash is "beyond (south of) Tanqua River". Agriculture forms the mainstay of Tanqua Millash’s economic life. As elsewhere in most districts of Tembien, social services were hardly developed until the 1990s. After that, schools and health centers of the calling have emerged. The backwardness was partly attributed to the region's relative geographic remoteness from the center.

== History ==
Tanqua Millash was a constituent of the old Tembien awrajja.

In 2020, the earlier district Abergele became inoperative and its territory belongs to the following new districts:

- Abergele (new, smaller, district)
- Tanqua Millash district (part of it)

Tanqua Millash comprises the municipalities of Simret, Menachek and Mizan which were transferred from Dogu'a Tembien.

== Rock churches ==
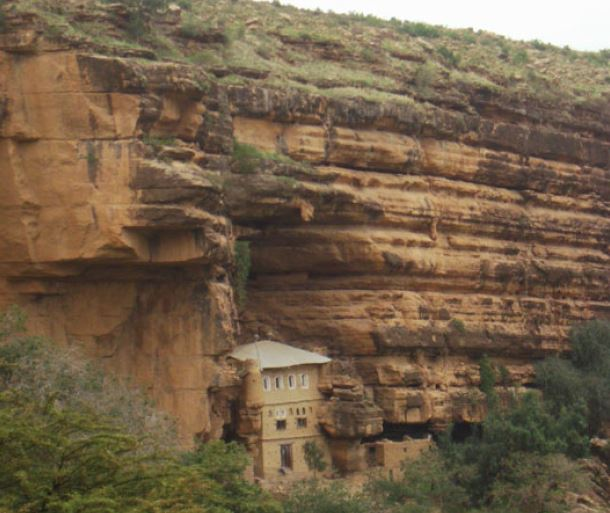
Abune Aregewi church in Zeyi, holding the entrance of the Zeyi cave

Tanqua Millash holds several rock-hewn or monolithic churches. They have literally been hewn from rock, probably before the 10th C. CE, One such church is located along the slopes of the Degua Tembien massif. The Kidane Mihret rock church of Addi Nefas (13°33.3′N 39°1.44′E) is hewn from Adigrat sandstone. Further up, in the municipalities of Simret, Menachek and Mizan that were recently transferred from Degua Tembien to Tanqua Millash, there are an additional eight rock churches and natural caves with a church at its entrance.

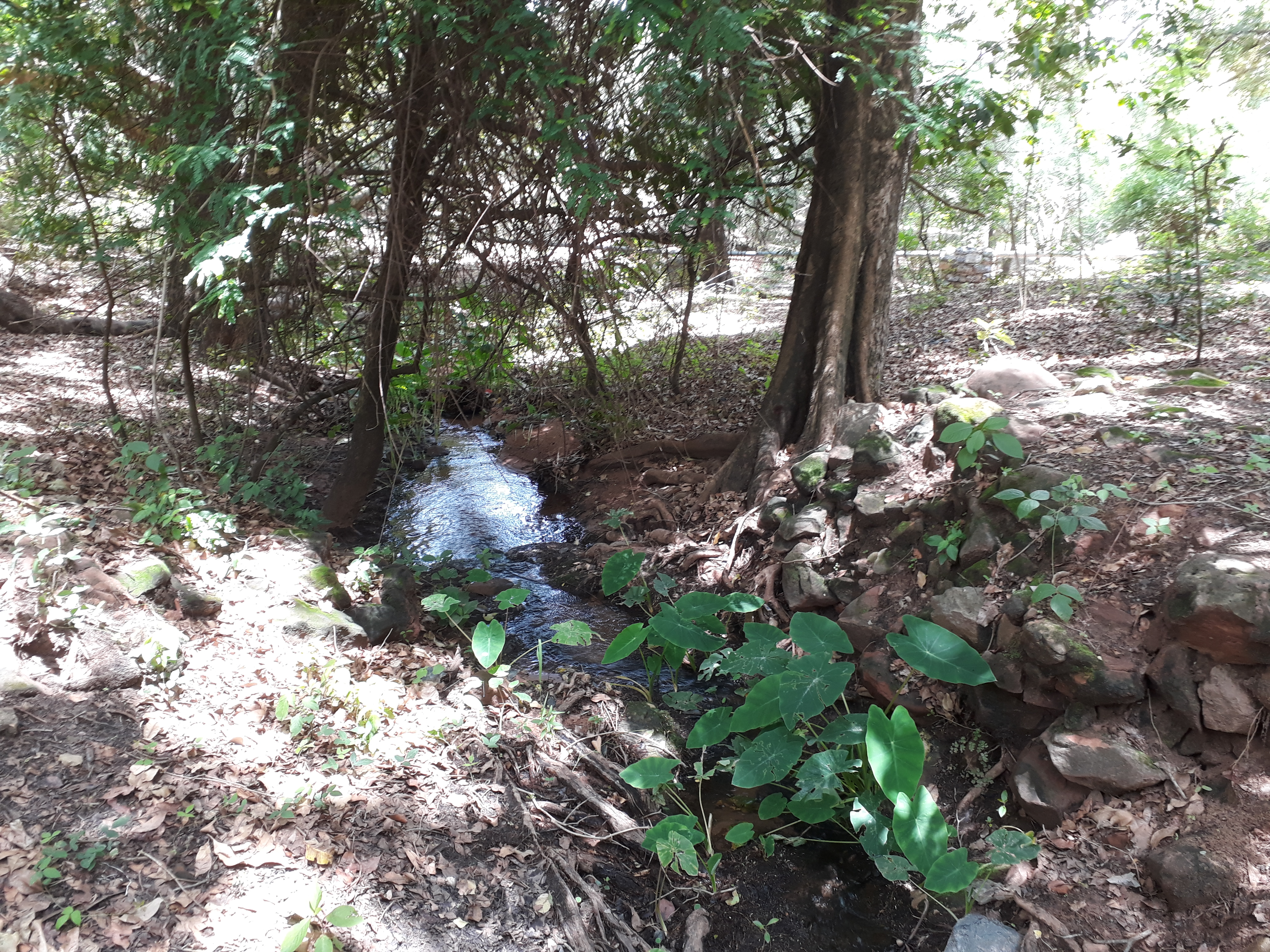
A rare spring in Adenna church forest

== Agriculture ==
=== Cropping ===
A sample enumeration performed by the CSA in 2001 interviewed 15,123 farmers in this district, who held an average of 1.63 hectares of land. Of the 24,690 hectares of private land surveyed, 87% was in cultivation, 0.2% pasture, 11% fallow, and 1.7% was devoted to other uses. For the land under cultivation in this district, 82% was planted in cereals, 2.3% in pulses, 3% in oilseeds, and 0.02% in vegetables. Four hectares were planted in fruit trees and 18 in gesho. Land tenure in this district is distributed amongst 85% owning their land, and 15% renting; the percentage reported as holding their land under other forms of tenure is missing.

=== Livestock ===
In 2001, 89% of the farmers both raised crops and livestock, while 10% only grew crops and 0.5% only raised livestock.

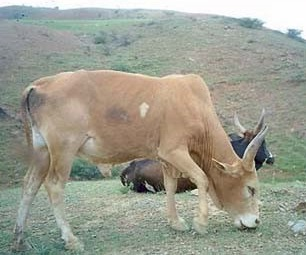
Abergele cattle, a landrace that is very popular in Tanqua Millash

Mainly used for draught, among the different cattle landraces in Tigray, Jointly with Abergele, Tanqua Millash holds its own landrace, the small and resistant Abergele cattle. Other landraces include the Arado cattle, the widely dominant variety of adjacent districts. In addition, long-horned Raya oxen are purchased from Southern Tigray as draught animals.
