= Abergele (woreda) =

District in Tigray Region, Ethiopia

Tanqua Abergele ጣንቋ ኣበርገለ
- Woreda
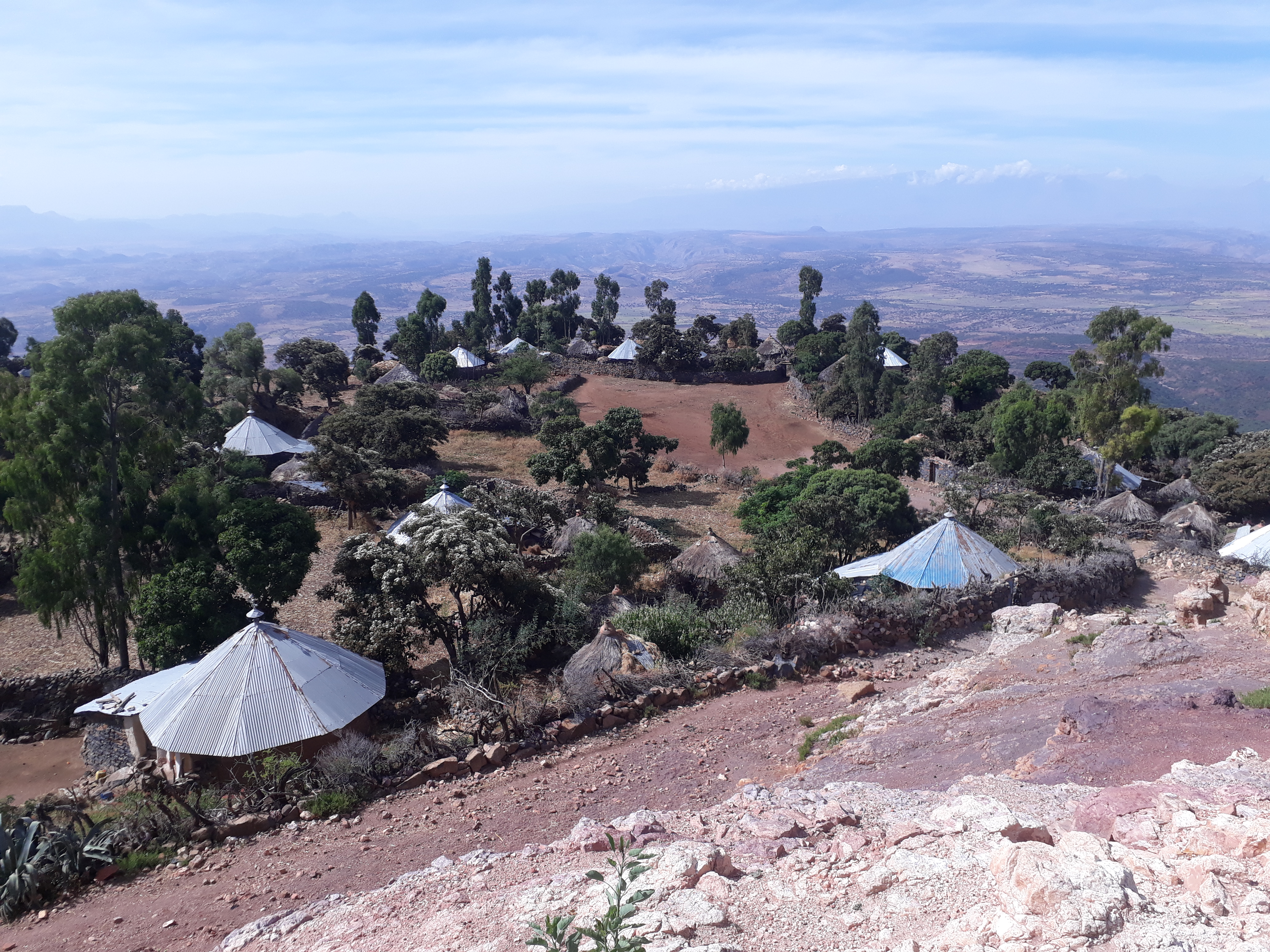
- View on the Abergele lowlands, from Santarfa

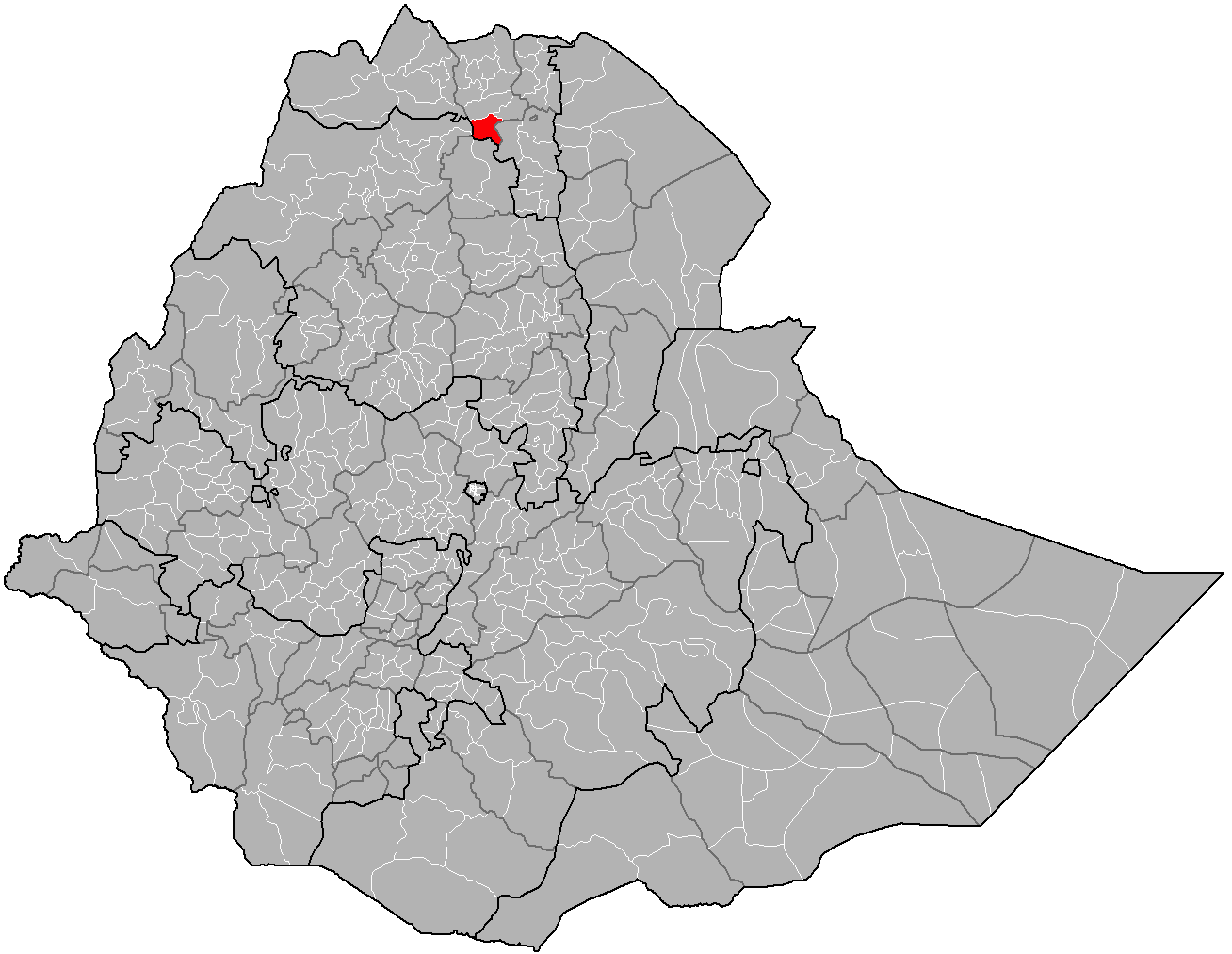
- Country: Ethiopia
- Region: Tigray
- Zone: Maekelay

Area
  - Total: 2,407.88 km^{2} (929.69 sq mi)

Population (2007)
  - Total: 93,185

Tanqua Abergele (Tigrinya: ጣንቋ ኣበርገለ, Amharic: አበርገሌ) is one of the woredas in the Tigray Region of Ethiopia. Part of the Mehakelegnaw Zone, Abergele is bordered on the south by the Wag Hemra Zone of Amhara Region, then by the Tekezé River on the west which separates it from North Gondar Zone of Amhara Region, on the north by Kola Tembien, on the east by Degua Tembien and on the southeast by the Debub Misraqawi (South Eastern) Zone. The administrative center of this woreda is Yechila; other towns in Abergele include Sele and Jijike. Abergele is one of the low lying districts of central Tigray and the Tanqua River, which originates near Hagere Selam, flows through this woreda and joins the Geba just north of Jijike. It further feeds the Tekezé River. The Tekezé Dam is also located in this woreda.

== History ==
It was a constituent of the old Tembien awrajja. Historically, Abergele seems to have formed a province since early times (perhaps the 14th century).

Abergele appears on indigenous maps of the northern Horn of Africa in the 15th Century.

It was governed by a shum in the reign of Lebna Dengel and Susenyos (16th-17th century). According to the chronicle of atse Yohannes I, the people of Abergele joined the rebellion, which was led by Fares and Zayohannes and suppressed by abeto Dalbe Iyesus in 1678.

Nowadays Abergele is bounded by Enderta in the east, Sekota in the south and qolla Tembien, in the northern and western directions. It assumes a unique position mainly for its trilinguistic makeup. Its inhabitants constitute the sole Agaw enclave in Tigray, but the majority speaks Tigrinya and some Amharic as well. In terms of religion, however, they are predominantly adherents of Christianity. Very few of them practice Islam.

In 2020, woreda Abergele became inoperative and its former territory belongs to the following new woredas:

- Abergele (new, smaller, woreda)
- Tanqua Millash woreda

Agriculture forms the main stay of Abergele economic life. As elsewhere in most districts of Tembien, social services are hardly developed. The first schools and health centers of the calling are just emerging. This was partly attributed to the region's relative geographic remoteness from the center. This seclusion and strategic position at the cross-roads of Wollo, Tigray, and Gondar, seemed to have made it a safe abode for political dissidents for over centuries. It hoisted series of protracted armed encounters between the chiefs of these regions including that of Yejju.

== Rock church ==
Abergele holds a rock-hewn church. It was created probably before the 10th century CE, and is located along the slopes of the Dogu'a Tembien massif. The Kidane Mihret rock church of Addi Nefas (13°33.3′N 39°1.44′E) is hewn from Adigrat sandstone.

== Demographics ==
Based on the 2007 national census conducted by the Central Statistical Agency of Ethiopia (CSA), this woreda has a total population of 93,185, except an increase of 59.64% over the 1994 census, of whom 47,512 are men and 45,673 women; 7,035 or 7.55% are urban inhabitants. With an area of 2,407.88 square kilometers, Abergele has a population density of 38.70, which is less than the Zone average of 56.29 persons per square kilometer. A total of 19,775 households were counted in this woreda, resulting in an average of 4.71 persons to a household, and 18,767 housing units. The majority of the inhabitants said they practiced Ethiopian Orthodox Christianity, with 98.91% reporting that as their religion.

The 1994 national census reported a total population for this woreda of 58,373, of whom 29,541 were men and 28,832 were women; 2,334 or 4% of its population were urban dwellers. The two largest ethnic groups reported in Abergele were the Tigrayan (97.93%), and the Agaw Kamyr (1.82%); all other ethnic groups made up 0.25% of the population. Tigrinya was spoken as a first language by 98.17%, and 1.43% spoke Kamyr; the remaining 0.4% spoke all other primary languages reported. 99.83% of the population practiced Ethiopian Orthodox Christianity, and 0.12% were Muslim. Concerning education, 5.92% of the population were considered literate, which is less than the Zone average of 14.21%; 4.04% of children aged 7–12 were in primary school; a negligible number of the children aged 13–14 were in junior secondary school, and a negligible number of the inhabitants aged 15–18 were in senior secondary school. Concerning sanitary conditions, about 72% of the urban houses and 19% of all houses had access to safe drinking water at the time of the census; none of the urban and 1.6% of the total had toilet facilities.

== Agriculture ==
=== Cropping ===
A sample enumeration performed by the CSA in 2001 interviewed 15,123 farmers in this woreda, who held an average of 1.63 hectares of land. Of the 24,690 hectares of private land surveyed, 87% was in cultivation, 0.2% pasture, 11% fallow, and 1.7% was devoted to other uses. For the land under cultivation in this woreda, 82% was planted in cereals, 2.3% in pulses, 3% in oilseeds, and 0.02% in vegetables. Four hectares were planted in fruit trees and 18 in gesho. Land tenure in this woreda is distributed amongst 85% owning their land, and 15% renting; the percentage reported as holding their land under other forms of tenure is missing.

=== Livestock ===
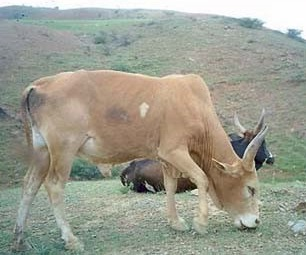
Abergele cattle

In 2001, 89% of the farmers both raised crops and livestock, while 10% only grew crops and 0.5% only raised livestock.

Mainly used for draught, among the different cattle landraces in Tigray, Abergele is outstanding, as it holds its own landrace, the small and resistant Abergele cattle. Other varieties include the Arado cattle, the widely dominant variety of adjacent districts. In addition, long-horned Raya oxen are purchased from Southern Tigray as draught animals.

== Reservoirs ==
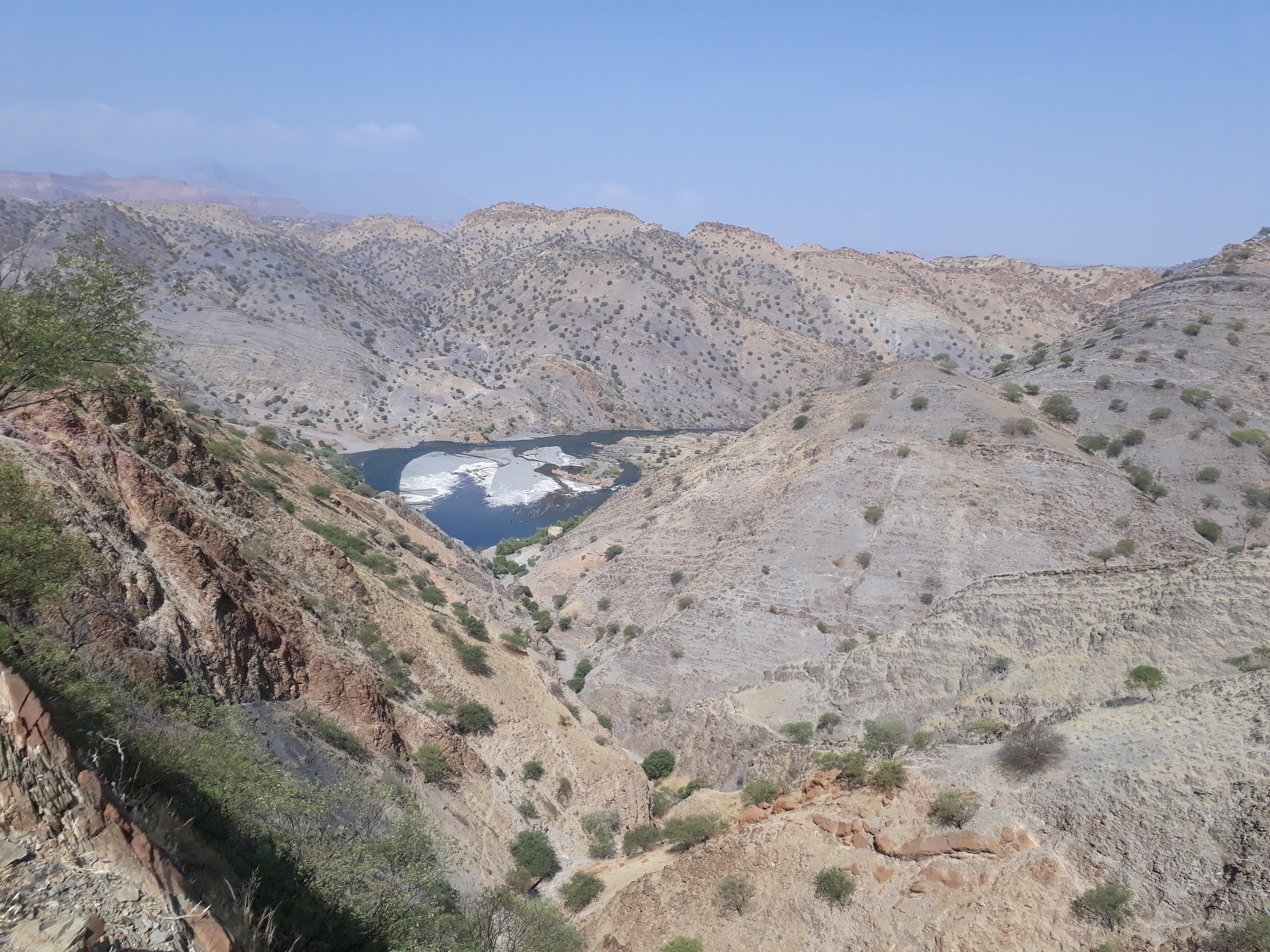
Tekezze River, just downstream from Tekezze dam

In this district with rains that last only for a couple of months per year, most rivers (for instance May Selelo and Zikuli Rivers) run dry after the end of the rainy season. Hence, reservoirs of different sizes allow harvesting runoff from the rainy season for further use in the dry season. Besides the larger Tekezé Dam, the reservoirs of the district include Aqushela. Overall, these reservoirs suffer from rapid siltation. Part of the water that could be used for irrigation is lost through seepage; the positive side-effect is that this contributes to groundwater recharge.
