= Agbe =

Municipality in Ethiopia

Agbe ኣግበ Sele
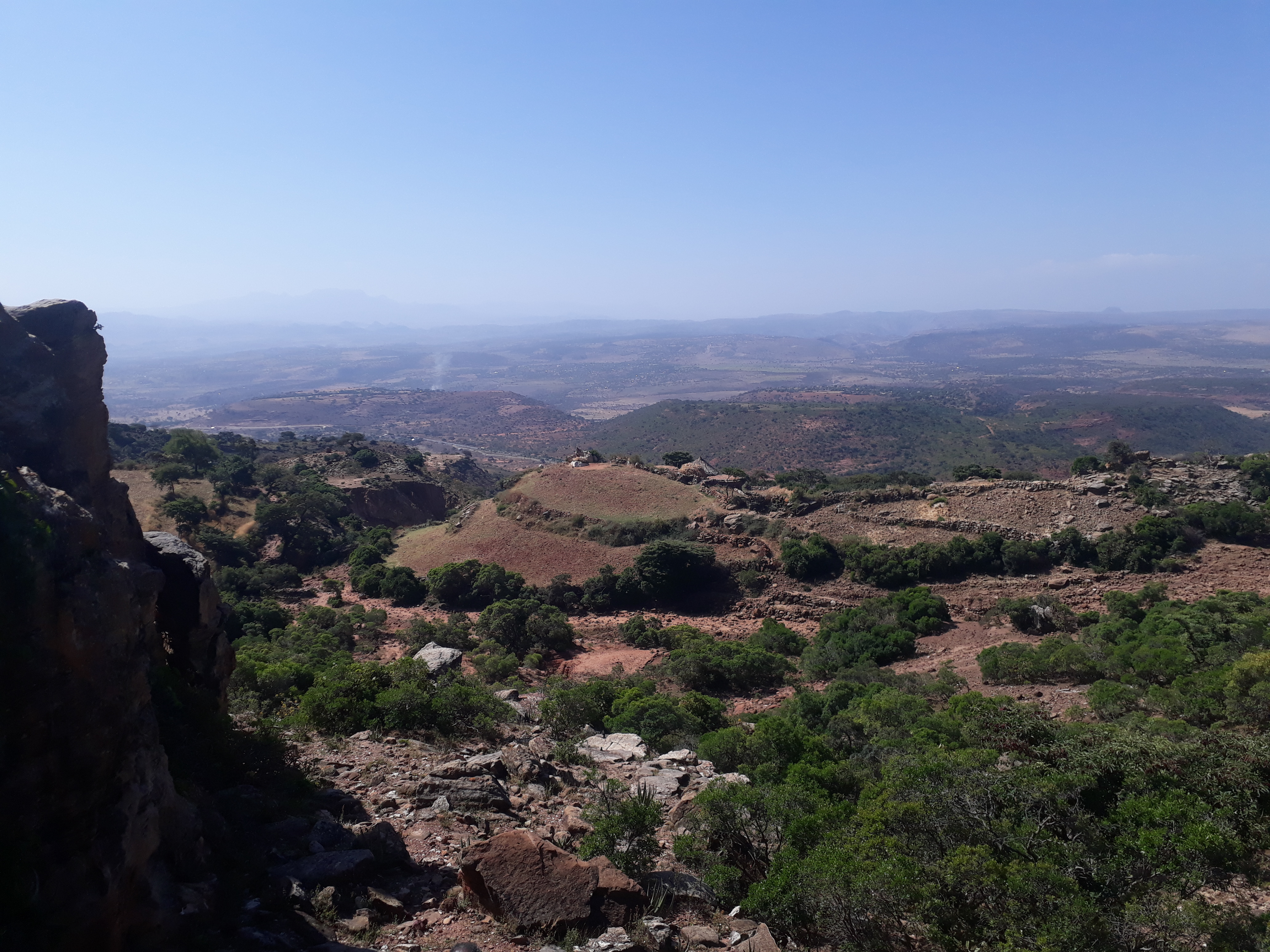
- View from Debre Sema'it to Agbe lowlands

- Location within Ethiopia
- Coordinates: 13°33′N 39°3′E
- Country: Ethiopia
- Region: Tigray
- Zone: Central
- Woreda: Tanqua Millash
- Elevation: 1,650 m (5,410 ft)
- Time zone: UTC+3 (EAT)

Agbe is the main locality of the Tanqua Millash district of the Tigray Region of Ethiopia. The municipality (tabia) centre is in Sele town. Until January 2020, Agbe belonged to the Abergele district.

== Geography ==
The tabia occupies the southwestern footslopes of the Degua Tembien massif.

=== Geology ===
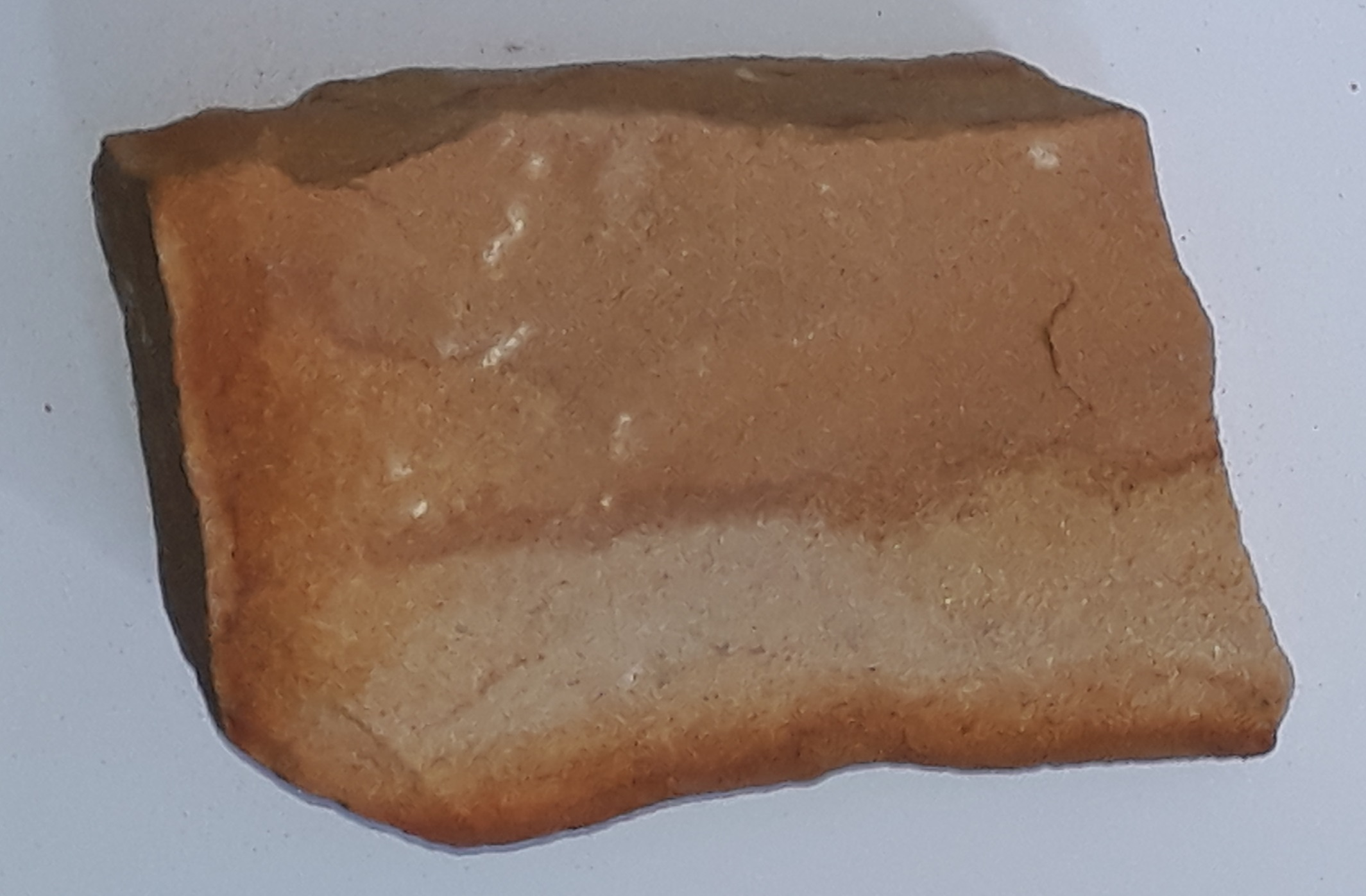
Rock sample of Adigrat Sandstone, collected at Kalazban

From the higher to the lower locations, the following geological formations are present:

- Antalo Limestone
- Adigrat Sandstone
- Edaga Arbi Glacials

=== Springs ===
As there are no permanent rivers, the presence of springs is of utmost importance for the local people. The main springs in the tabia are may Hitsare and Ayni Sele they are in Agbe, where construction works for a soft drinks factory have been started.

=== Settlements ===
The tabia centre Sele holds a few administrative offices, a health post, a primary school, and some small shops. There are a few more primary schools across the tabia. The main other populated places are:

- Agbe
- Akalazba
- Miqmat Aqeytay
- Ch’ekh
- Milehay Mereu
- Meserete Birhan
- Babdre
- Enda Mikial
- Ebda Aba Tomas
- Enda Abune Hawarya
- Deleq
- Babdre
- Sheka ( shagla Muren)
- Gereb Giba
- Shewuate Hugum
- Adi Wahro
- Gdmi Aboy Gerezihar
- Majur
- Shekah Fuqur
- Adi Siera
- Adi Qeley
- Adenna
- Adi Nifas
- Hadush Adi
- Jibare
- Zuqli
- Menew
- Yeresere
- Enda Maryam Qorar
- Kerene
- Dawusra
- Aqeb Dmu
- Tselim Beati
- kamshana
- Seyemtirba
- Adi Amday

== Economy and livelihood ==
The population lives essentially from crop farming, supplemented with off-season work in nearby towns. The farmers have adapted their cropping systems to the spatio-temporal variability in rainfall. In a certain way, there is irrigation of various fruits and peppers in “Shekah” irrigation with water from both sources Hitsare and Ayni Sele springs

Historically Friday was the Market day of Agbe but Since 2004, it has been changed to Saturday by order of the local administration this day Saturday is the market day.

== History and culture ==
=== History ===
The history of the tabia is strongly confounded with the history of Tembien.

=== Religion and churches ===
Agbe is the birthplace of Ligaba Guangul Riese, who was the palace protocol of Yohannes IV. Children: Degezmati Gebremedhn Guangul and Degezmati Seyoum Guangul Grand Children: Fitawurari Girmay and Fitawurari Yohannes

Agbe is surrounded by many ancient monasteries including Qeqema Maryam, Chikh Selassie, and Mennewe Libanos

Most inhabitants are Orthodox Christians.

== Roads and communication ==
The main road Mekelle – Hagere Selam – Abiy Addi runs through the centre of the tabia. There are regular bus services to these towns.

== Tourism ==
Its mountainous nature and proximity to Mekelle makes the tabia fit for tourism.

=== Trekking routes ===
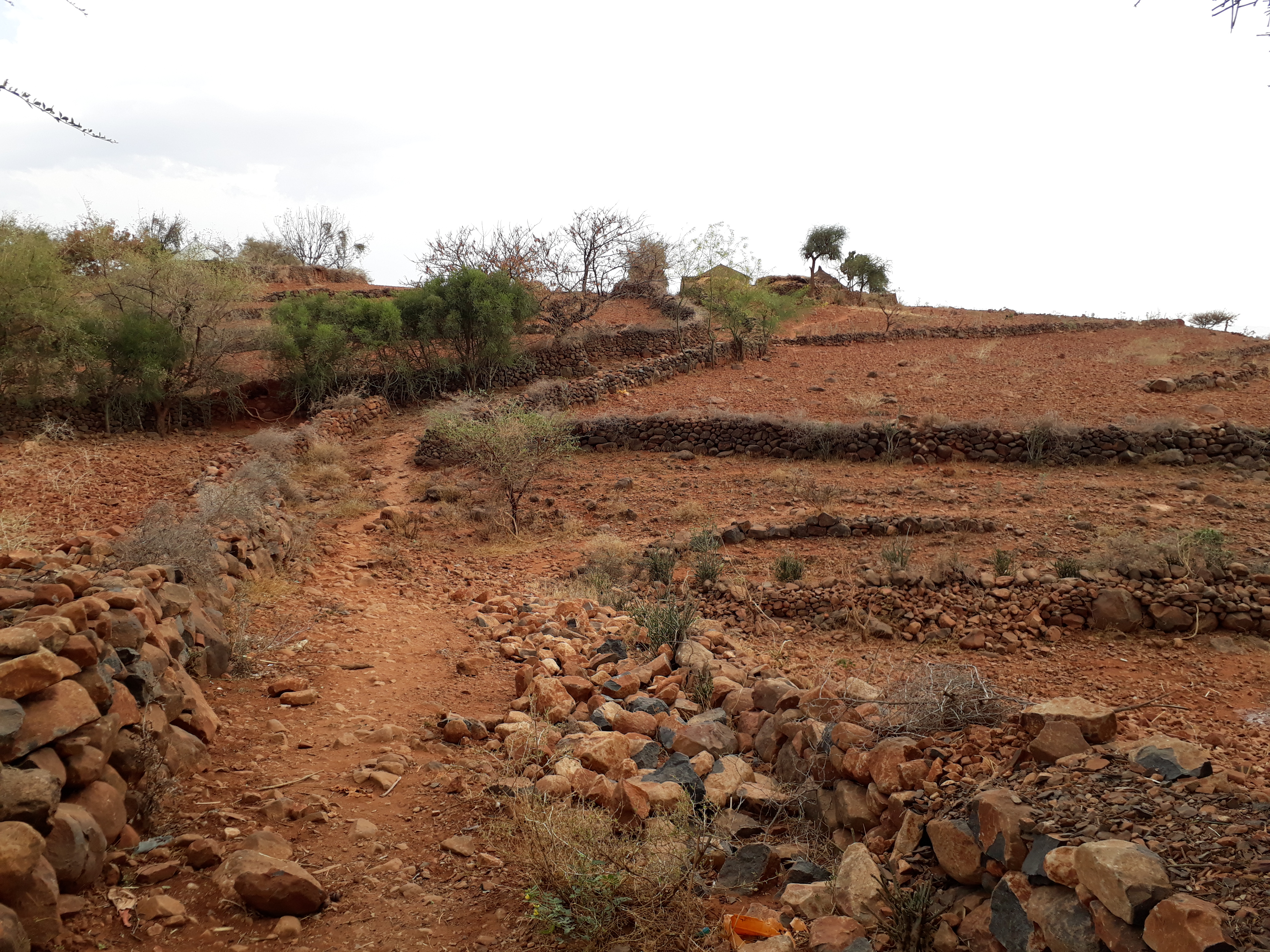
Along Trek 8 in Kalazban near Agbe

Trekking routes have been established in this tabia. The tracks are not marked on the ground but can be followed using downloaded .GPX files.

- Trek 8, is from Agbe to Kemishana, and further across May Selelo and Zikuli Rivers, along gorges and Zeyi cave to Inda Maryam Qorar
- Trek 19, from Sele to Debre Sema'it, and then it continues to Inda Maryam Qorar

Both treks involve a vertical interval of more than one kilometer and require good physical conditions.

=== Accommodation and facilities ===
Though facilities are basic, the inhabitants are hospitable.
