= Adigrat Sandstone =

Sandstone formation between Ethiopia and Eritrea border

- Stratigraphic range: Late Triassic–Early Jurassic
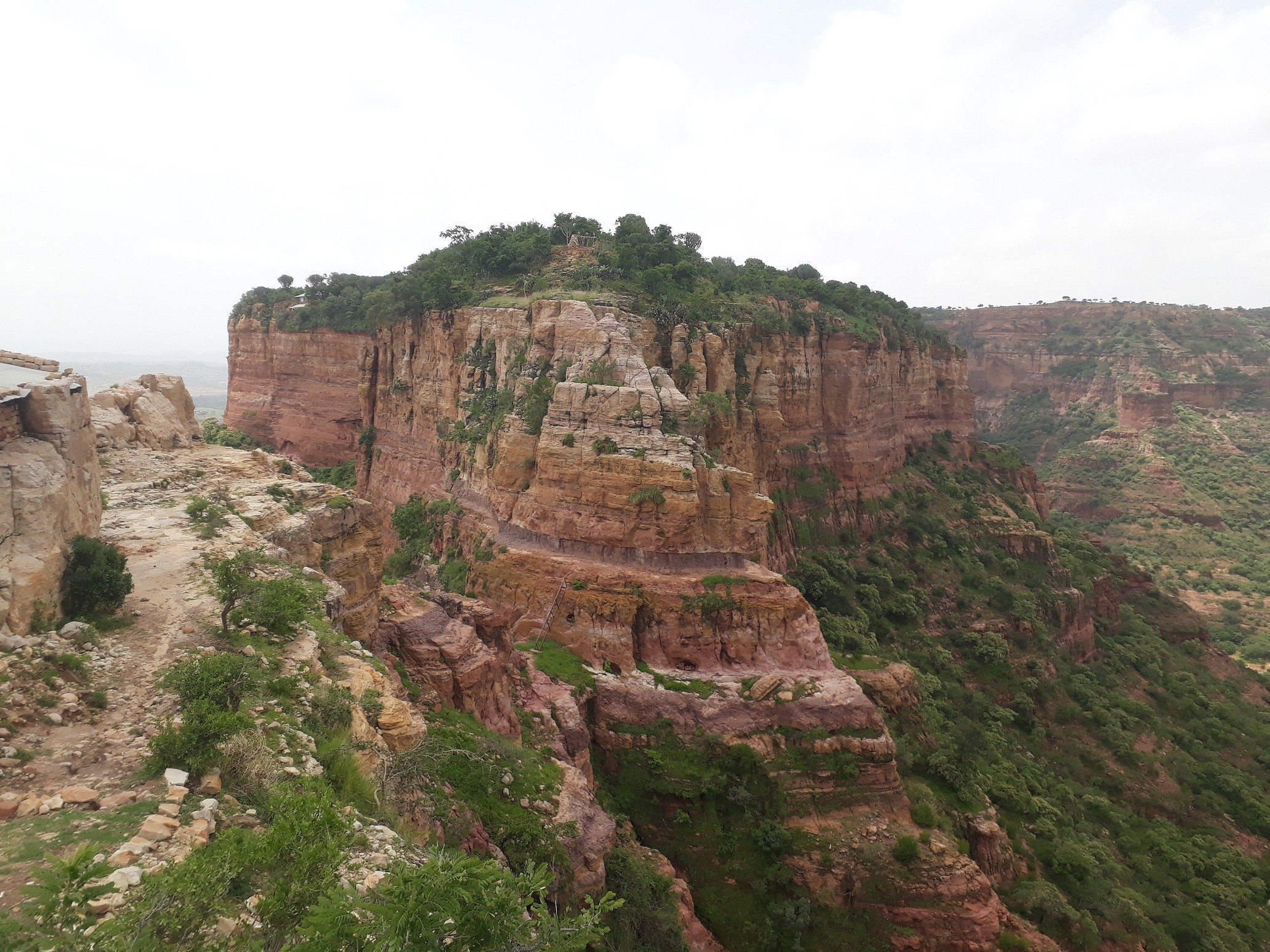
- Dabba Selama monastery in Dogu’a Tembien, established on a mesa in Adigrat Sandstone – one of the most inaccessible monasteries in the world
- Type: Geological formation
- Underlies: Antalo Limestone
- Overlies: Enticho Sandstone, Edaga Arbi Glacials, Fincha Sandstone
- Thickness: 600 m (2,000 ft)

Lithology
- Primary: Sandstone
- Other: Siltstone, Claystone, Dolomite

Location
- Coordinates: 14.1808°N 39.4752°E
- Region: Tigray
- Country: Ethiopia, Eritrea
- Extent: Eritrea, Tigray

Type section
- Named for: Town of Adigrat
- Named by: William Thomas Blanford
- Adigrat Sandstone (Ethiopia)

The Adigrat Sandstone formation in north Ethiopia, in a wide array of reddish colours, comprises sandstones with coarse to fine grains, and locally conglomerates, silt- and claystones. Given the many lateritic palaeosols and locally fossil wood fragments, the formation is interpreted as a deposit in estuarine, lacustrine-deltaic or continental environments. The upper limit of Adigrat Sandstone is of Middle-Late Jurassic age (around 160 million years or Ma ago) whereas the lower boundary is Triassic (200 Ma). There are numerous rock-hewn churches in this formation.

== Name and definition ==
The name “Adigrat Sandstone” was coined by geologist William Thomas Blanford, who accompanied the British Expedition to Abyssinia in 1868. The formation is named after the town of Adigrat, on the route of the invading British army. So far the nomenclature was not proposed for recognition to the International Commission on Stratigraphy.

== Stratigraphic context ==
The Adigrat Sandstone has been deposited upon a Triassic planation surface. The age of the Adigrat Sandstone is not well-defined and sedimentation has probably started at different times in different areas. Recent investigations using fossils determined a Late Triassic to Middle Jurassic age.

== Environment ==
A large part of the formation was deposited in a shallow sea, as indicated by the presence of fossils typical of brackish water and shallow marine environment (such as bivalves, foraminifera, and marine crocodiles). The sedimentary structures also suggest tidal environments and storm deposits. Other sediment and also sedimentary structures indicate that parts of the sands were deposited in a continental environment.

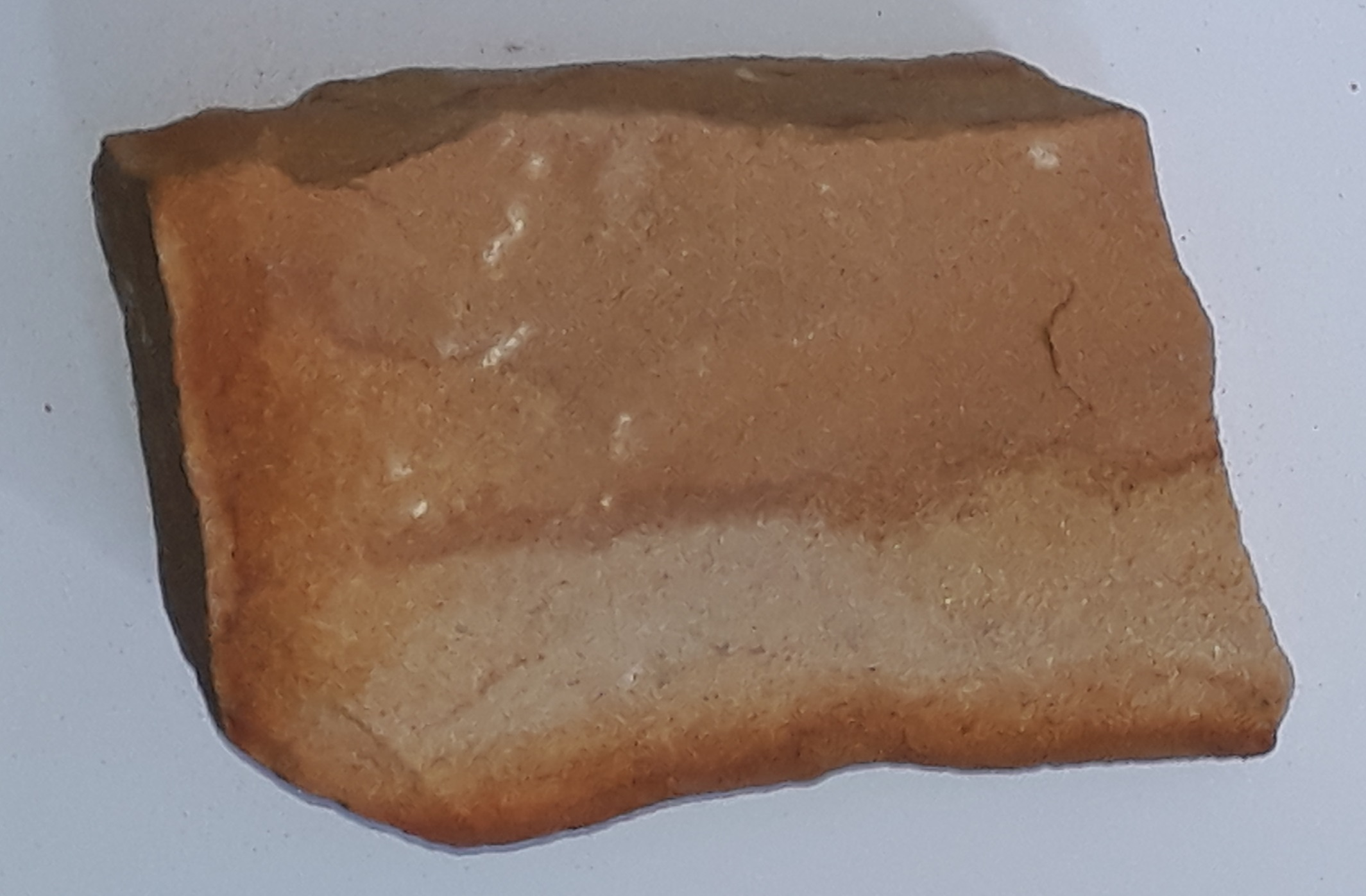
Rock sample of Adigrat Sandstone, collected at Kalazban

== Lithology ==
The Adigrat Sandstone comprises thick sequences of cross-bedded sandstone with minor intercalations of siltstone and claystone and sometimes dolomite. The sandstones consist essentially of quartz, but hold also some feldspar. The grains are cemented by silica and clay minerals. The thickness of the Adigrat Sandstone increases from north to south: maximum values (600 metres) are west of the Mekelle Outlier at the edge of Kola Tembien and Dogu’a Tembien districts.

== Life ==
In the Adigrat Sandstone, fossil wood fragments and trace fossils have been recorded. In addition, remains of vertebrate animals, such as non-marine amphibians and reptiles, have also been found.

== Geographical extent ==
The formation outcrops widely in north Ethiopia, particularly in the gorges formed by the Tekezze River and its affluents. In extends further to the southeast towards Soqota and to the northeast towards Gheralta, Adigrat and central Eritrea.

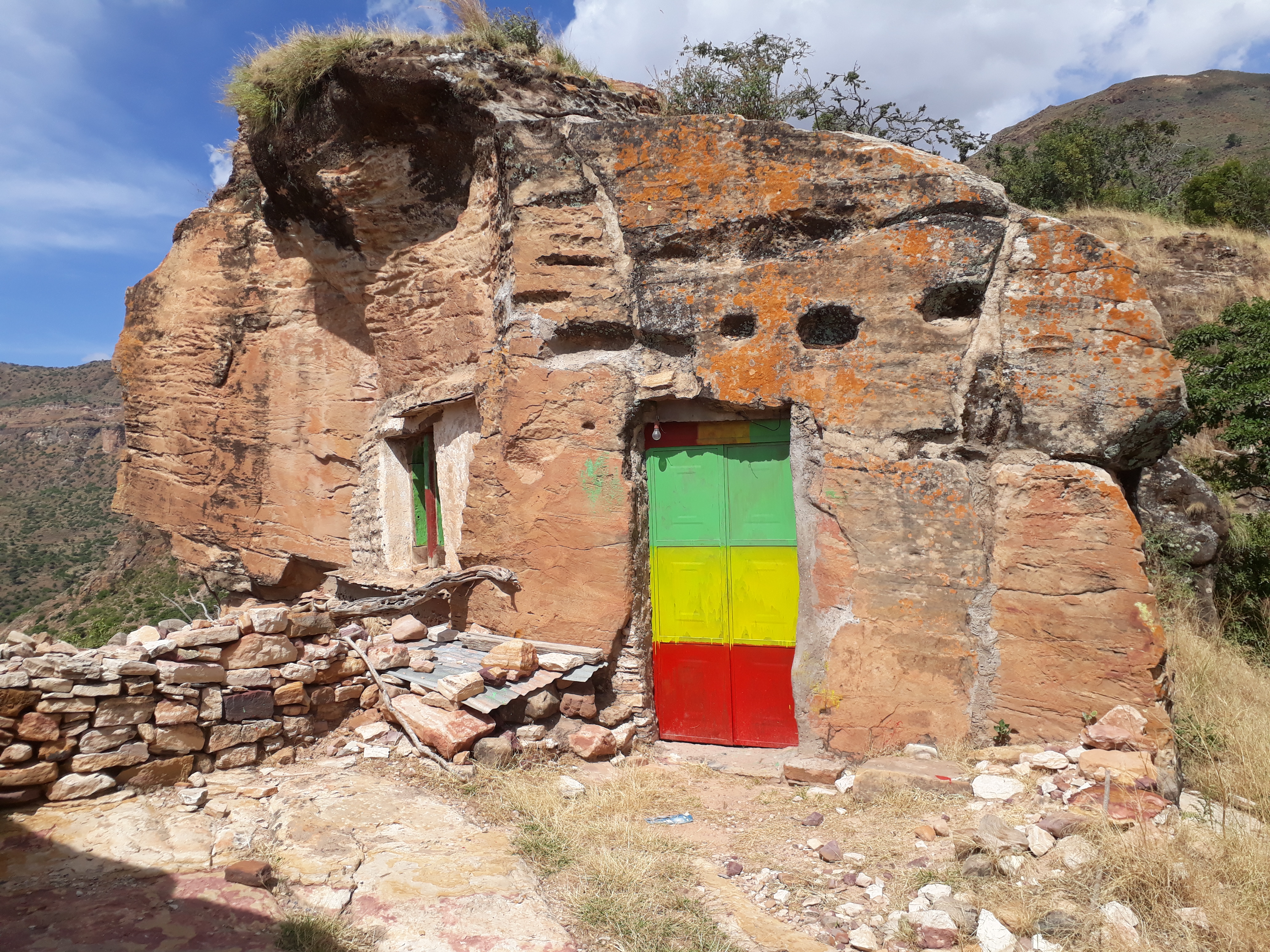
Debre Sema'it rock church

== The Rock-Hewn Churches in Adigrat Sandstone ==
Most of the rock-hewn monolithic churches in the Tigray region are in Adigrat Sandstone. These churches are located in the districts Hawzen, Kola Tembien and Dogu’a Tembien. The precise ages of these churches are not well defined but they would mostly have been excavated between the 10th and 15th centuries. According to local belief, the carving of the churches was started by missionaries who came from the Mediterranean to Ethiopia (known as the ‘Nine Saints’) during the fifth or sixth century. They promoted monasticism, hence the remote and inaccessible locations of many rock-hewn churches. The tradition continues until today, as new rock-hewn churches are being excavated. Although design and structure vary, most rock churches consist of a hall with basilica architecture holding three naves, often vestibule, domes, pillars, vast ceilings and archways. Ceilings and walls may be decorated with colourful frescoes and rock carvings. Most of these mediaeval churches are still in use today as Orthodox village churches.

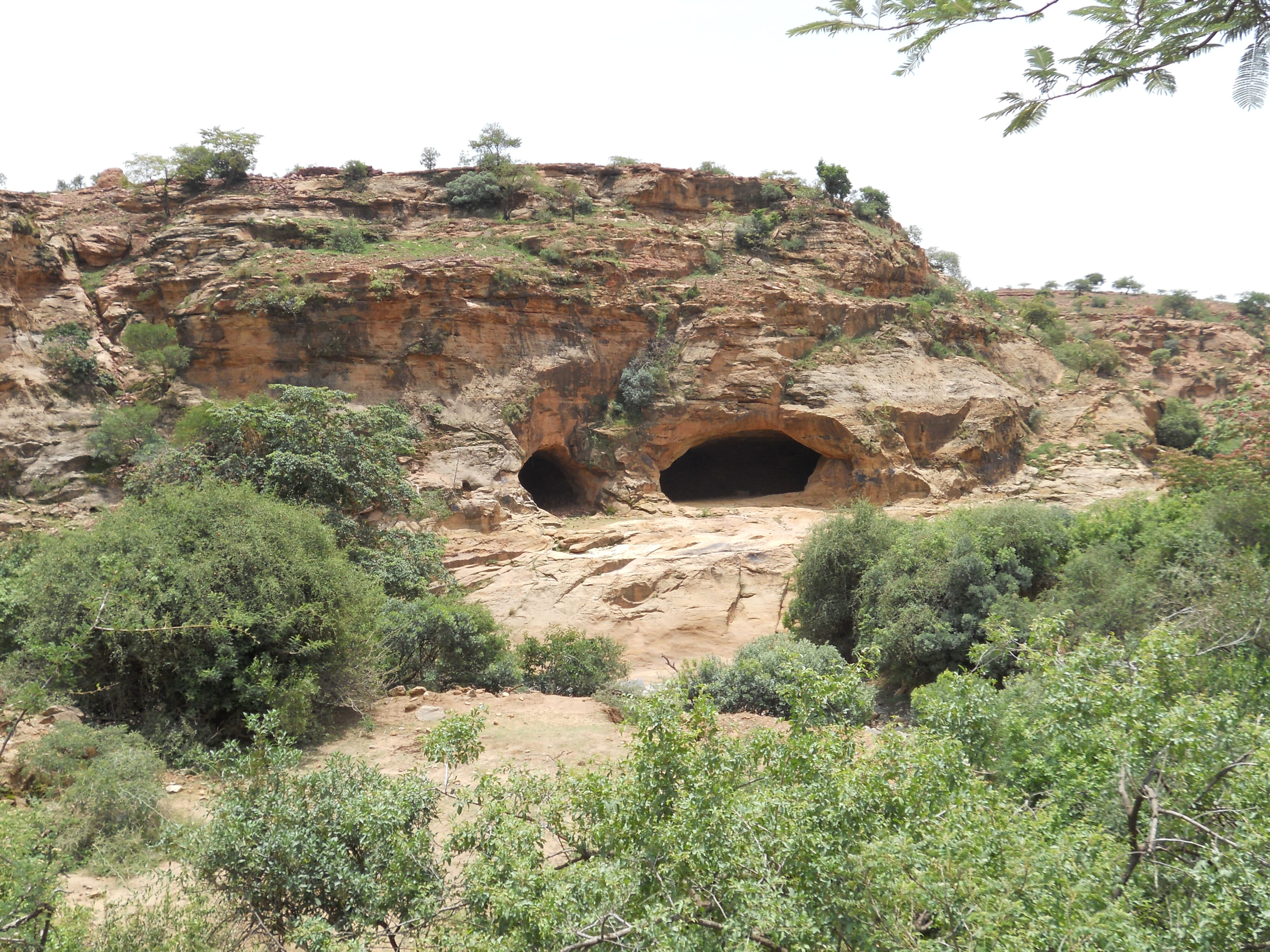
The “red caves” or Kayeh Be’ati in Adigrat Sandstone, at the border of Dogu’a and Kola Tembien

The mediaeval Siqurto foot tunnel has also been excavated in Adigrat Sandstone.

== Geomorphology ==
The Adigrat Sandstone is intersected by an orthogonal network of joints. In thick and homogeneous sandstone, there is a distance of tens of metres between major joints. As the uplift of the Ethiopian Highlands during the Caenozoic resulted deep incision of the rivers, a remarkable Grand Canyon-like topography has been created, holding mesas, buttes, and pinnacles up to 300 metres high, beneath the main escarpment. The rectangular shape of these topographic forms indicates that their formation has been influenced by intersecting joints. A dominant process in cliff formation is rockfall. Variations of slope steepness along the escarpments are due to the distinctive bedding of the rocks and to variability in rock type: on thick sequences of homogeneous sandstone vertical faces have developed, while intercalations of thinly bedded fine-grained sediments lead to steps in the slopes.

Caverns and apses have formed along bedding planes and along joints. These natural cavities have sometimes been expanded into larger caves by the inhabitants of the area.
