= Abergele cattle =

Type of cattle

Abergele
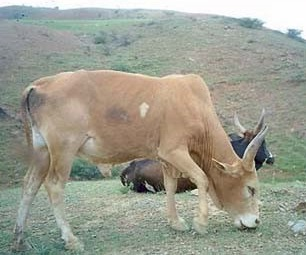
- Abergele cattle
- Country of origin: Ethiopia
- Distribution: Abergele lowlands, southwestern slopes of Dogu'a Tembien
- Use: Draught, meat, milk (in that order)

Traits
- Weight: Male: 220–250 kilograms (490–550 lb); Female: 140–170 kilograms (310–370 lb)
- Coat: red or black
- Horn status: medium
- Cattle; Bos (primigenius) indicus

The Abergele cattle are the smallest breed of cattle in north Ethiopia. They are reared in the Abergele lowlands and at the southwestern lower slopes of Dogu'a Tembien district. Abergele cattle are part of the Zenga breed group. The Abergele breed is known for its adaptation to the hotter and drier lowlands. It is also very tolerant to diseases and parasites and can cope with feed shortages during long dry periods.

== Physical characteristics ==
The Abergele cattle generally have red coat colours. Bulls and oxen have thick and short horns and a cervicothoracic hump; cows have medium, thin horns. Oxen weigh 234kg and cows 153 kg on average. The average height at withers of 109 and 97 cm.

== Closely related types ==
- Arado cattle

== Origin of the cattle breed ==
Ethiopia has been at a crossroads for cattle immigration to Africa due to

- proximity to the geographical entry of Indian and Arabian zebu
- proximity to Near-Eastern and European taurine
- introgression with West African taurine due to pastoralism

Furthermore, the diverse agro-ecology led to diverse farming systems which, in turn, made Ethiopia a centre of secondary diversification for livestock :

- The Sanga cattle originated in Ethiopia. They are a major bovine group in Africa – a cross-breeding of local long-horned taurines and Arabian zebus
- The Zenga (Zebu-Sanga) breeds (including the Abergele), which resulted from a second introduction and crossing with Indian zebu

== Stresses on the cattle breed ==
- socio-political: urbanisation, and civil wars
- panzootic: cattle plague
- environmental: destruction of ecosystems and droughts
- modernisation stresses: extensive cross-breeding
