= Mizan (Tanqua Millash) =

Municipality in Tigray Region, Ethiopia

- Municipality
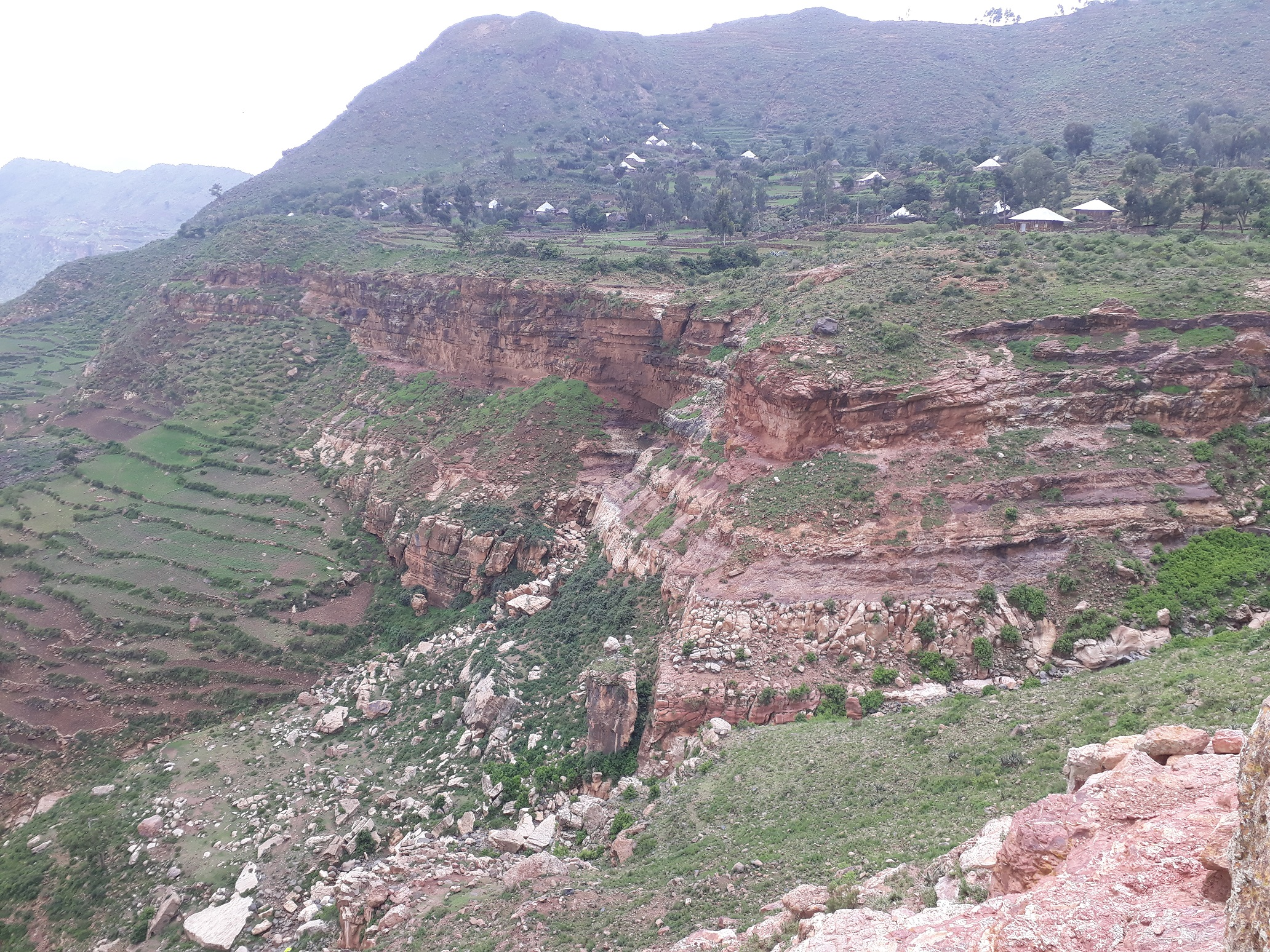
- Gumuara village in Mizan

- Location within Ethiopia
- Coordinates: 13°35′N 39°3′E
- Country: Ethiopia
- Region: Tigray
- Zone: Central
- Woreda: Tanqua Millash

Area
  - Total: 31.03 km^{2} (11.98 sq mi)
- Elevation: 2,530 m (8,300 ft)
- Time zone: UTC+3 (EAT)

Mizan is a tabia or municipality in the Tanqua Millash district of the Tigray Region of Ethiopia. This tabia includes the rock church of Debre Sema'it, as well as Arefa, reputedly birthplace of the Queen of Sheba. The tabia centre is in Kerene village. Until 2020, Mizan belonged to the Dogu'a Tembien district.

== Geography ==
The tabia occupies the Tsilare ridge, that overlooks the wide Tekezze lowlands. On the horizon, across Tekezze River, the Simien Mountains can be seen. The highest area is the plateau in Kerene at 2590 m a.s.l. and the lowest place is the foot of the escarpment at Debre Semay'it (1725 m a.s.l.).

=== Geology ===
From the higher to the lower locations, the following geological formations are present:

- Upper basalt
- Interbedded lacustrine deposits
- Lower basalt
- Amba Aradam Formation
- Antalo Limestone
- Adigrat Sandstone
- Edaga Arbi Glacials

==== Geological gallery ====
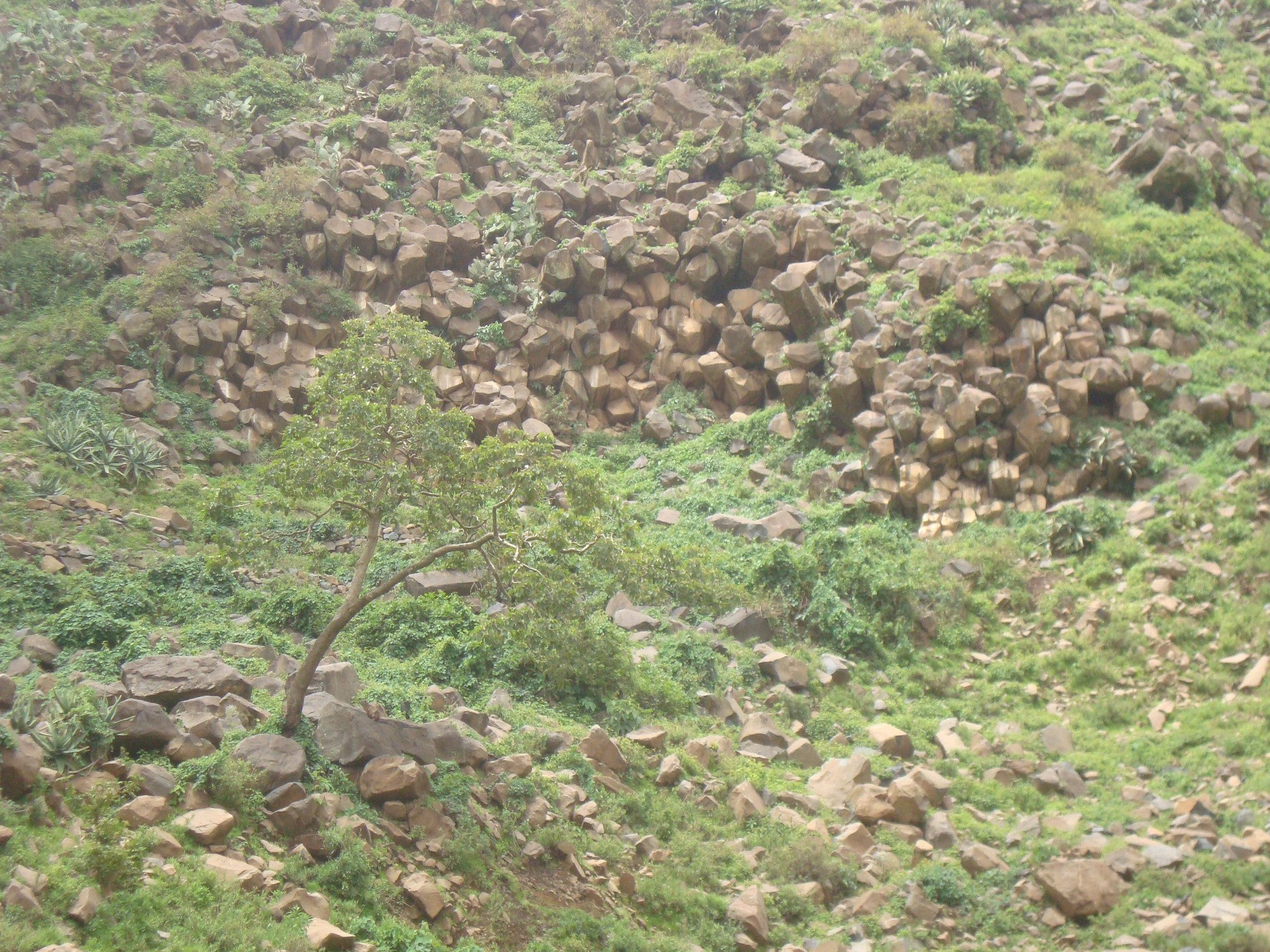
Hexagonal outcrop of Ashangi basalts.

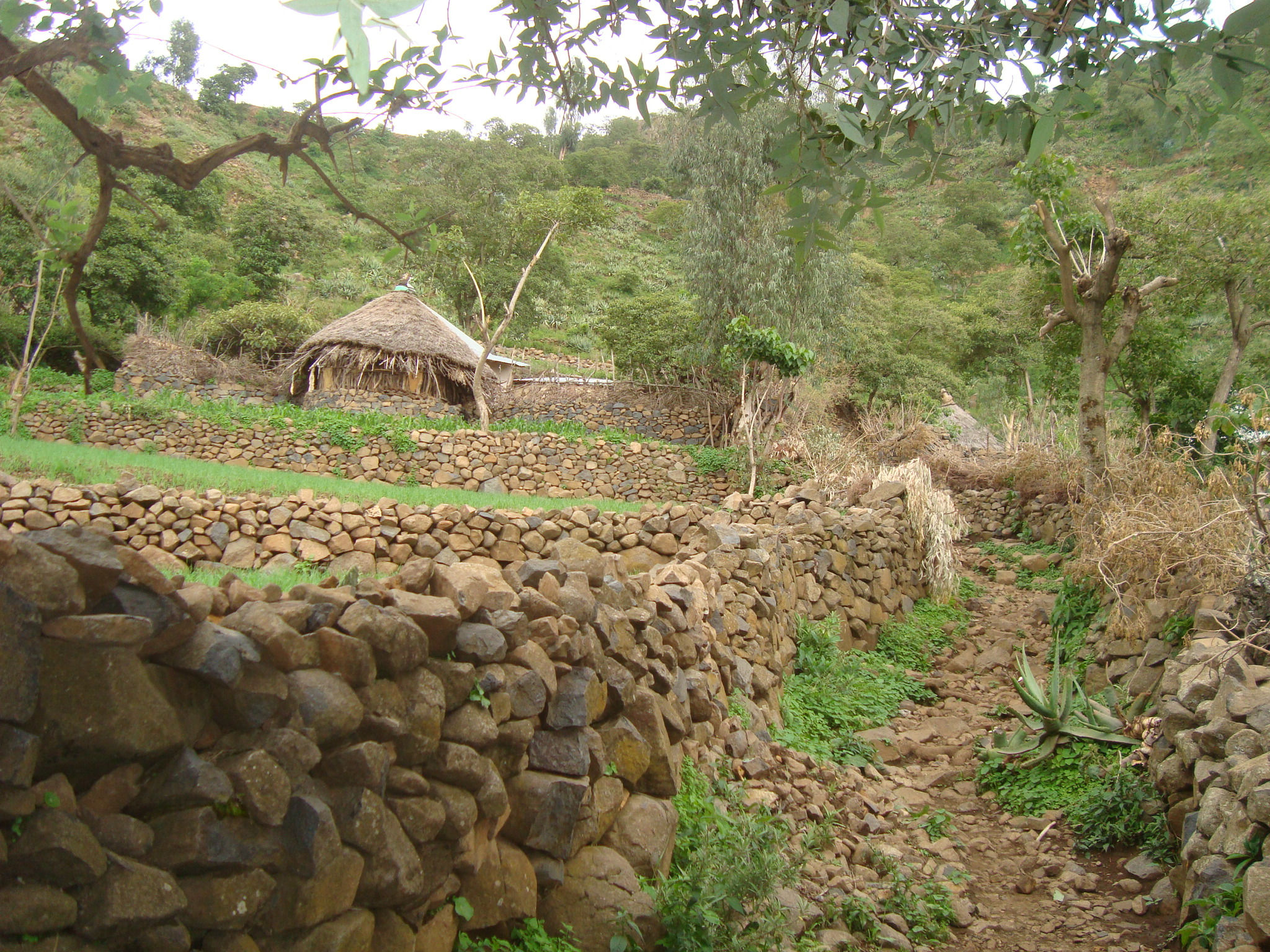
Ashangi basalts in Gumuara.

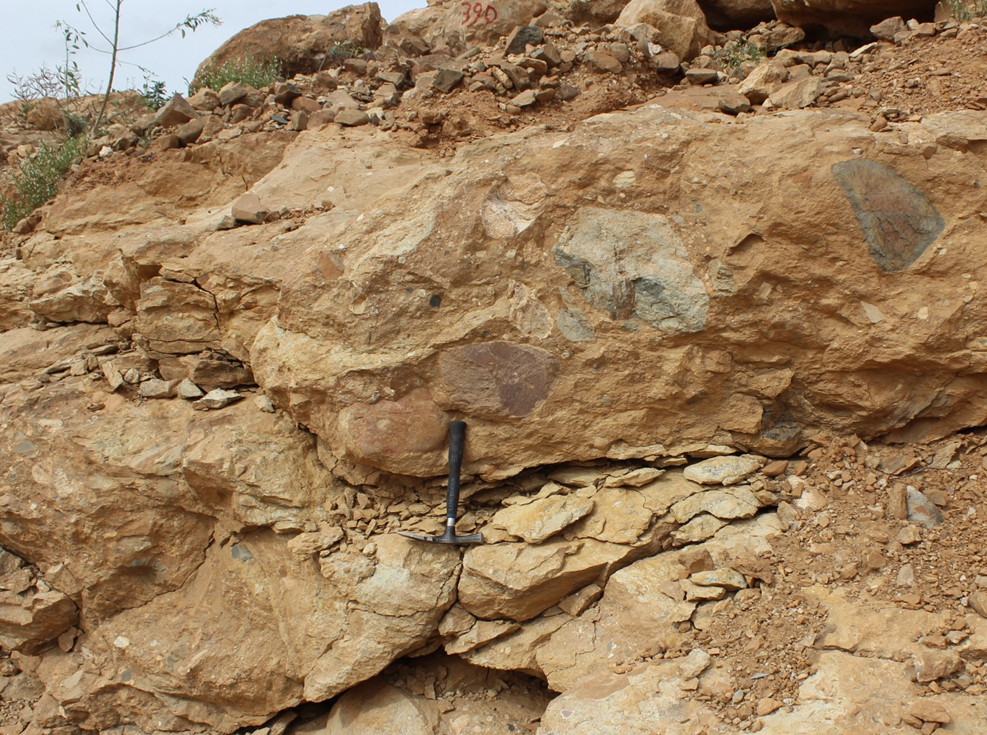
Edaga Arbi glacials at the foot of the escarpment.

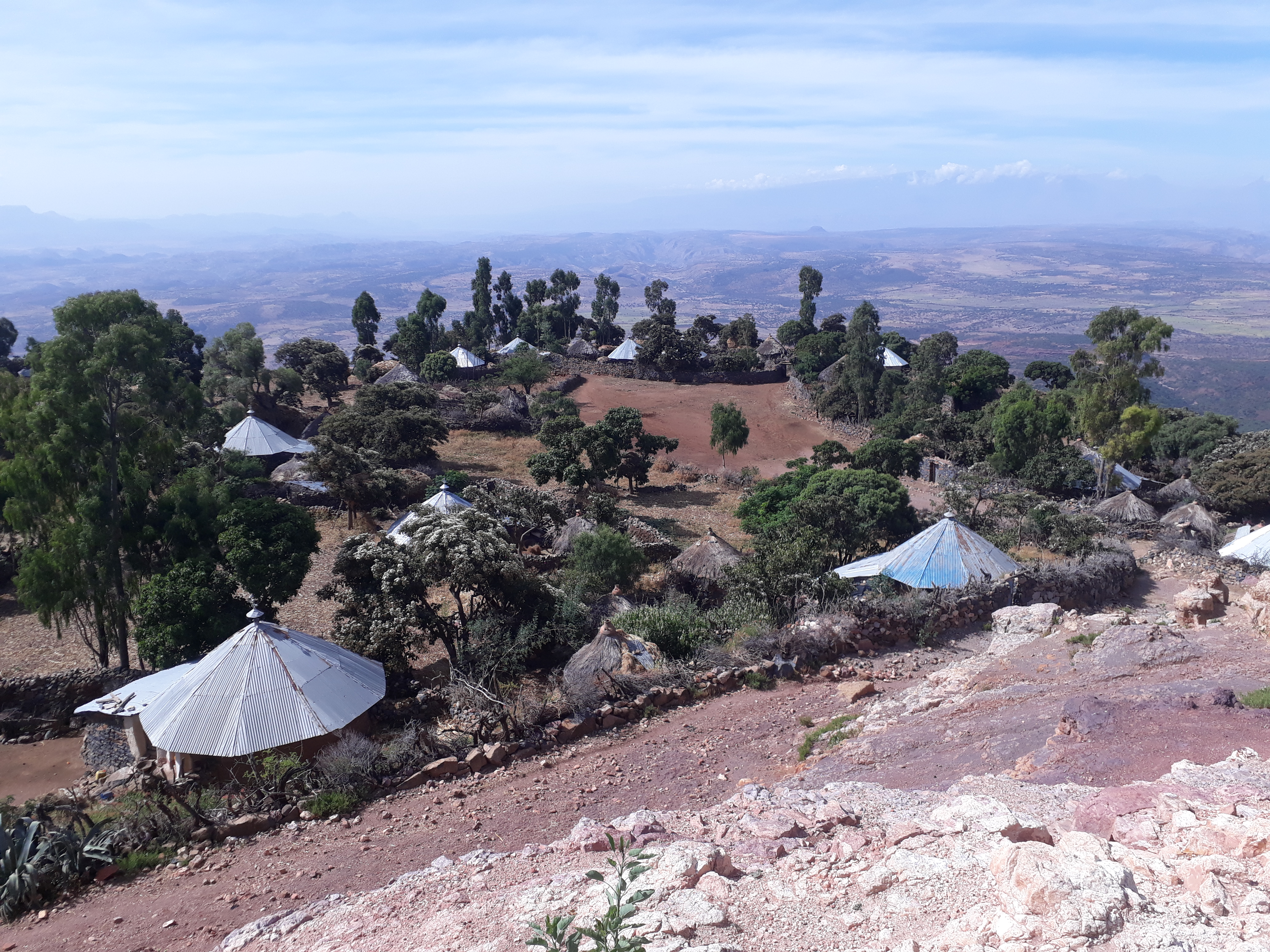
Village of Santarfa on a structural flat

=== Geomorphology and soils ===
The main geomorphic units, with corresponding soil types are:

- Basalt plateau
  - Associated soil types
    - deep, very dark clays with strong structure and very good natural fertility, temporarily waterlogged during the wet season (Vertisol)
    - shallow, very stony, loamy soils (Leptic and Skeletic Cambisol and Regosol)
    - moderately deep, brown, loamy soils with a good natural fertility (Luvisol)
  - Inclusions
    - complex of rock outcrops, very stony and very shallow soils ((Lithic) Leptosol)
    - moderately deep, stony, dark cracking clays (Vertic Cambisol)
- Adigrat Sandstone cliff and footslope
  - Associated soil types
    - complex of rock outcrops, very stony and very shallow soils ((Lithic) Leptosol)
    - shallow, stony sandy [[loam soils (Eutric Regosol and Cambisol)
  - Inclusions
    - shallow, dry soils with very high amounts of stones (Leptic and Skeletic Cambisol and Regosol)
    - deep, dark cracking clays with good fertility, but problems of waterlogging (Chromic and Pellic Vertisol)
    - soils with stagnating water due to an abrupt textural change such as sand over clay (Haplic Planosol]])

=== Climate ===
The rainfall pattern shows a very high seasonality with 70 to 80% of the annual rain falling in July and August. The mean temperature in Kerene is 17.8 °C, oscillating between an average daily minimum of 9.9 °C and a maximum of 25.3 °C. The contrasts between day and night air temperatures are much larger than seasonal contrasts.

=== Springs ===
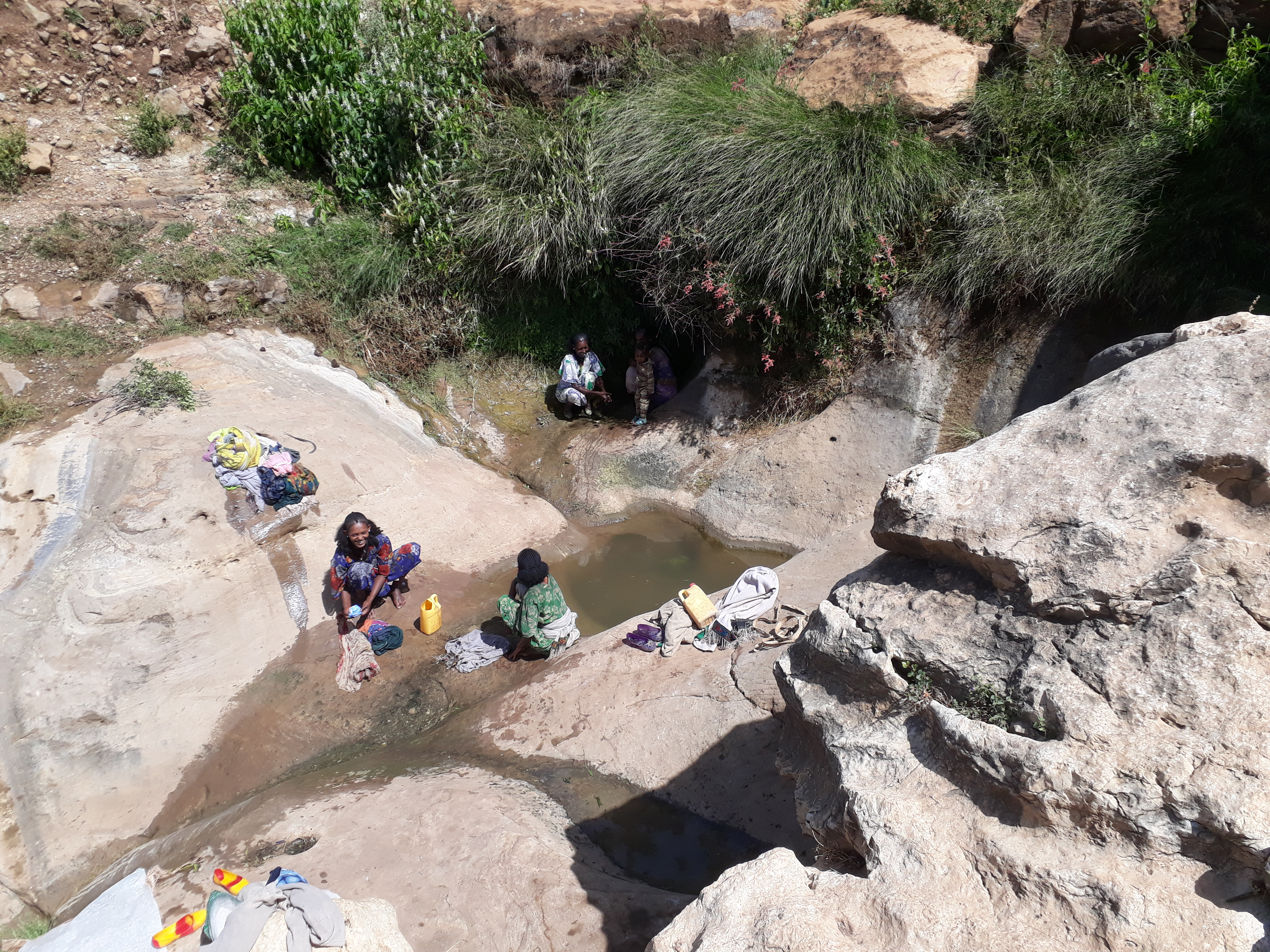
Washing clothes at the spring in Santarfa

As there are no permanent rivers, springs are of the utmost importance for the local people. The main springs in the tabia are:

- Debresema'it in the village of the same name
- Debregenet in Kekema
- May Mikale in Tsilere

=== Reservoirs ===
In this area with rains that last only for a couple of months per year, reservoirs of different sizes allow harvesting run-off from the rainy season for further use in the dry season.

There are both traditional surface water harvesting ponds, particularly in places without permanent springs, called rahaya and more recently constructed Horoyo. These are household ponds the construction of which has been promoted by development campaigns.

=== Settlements ===
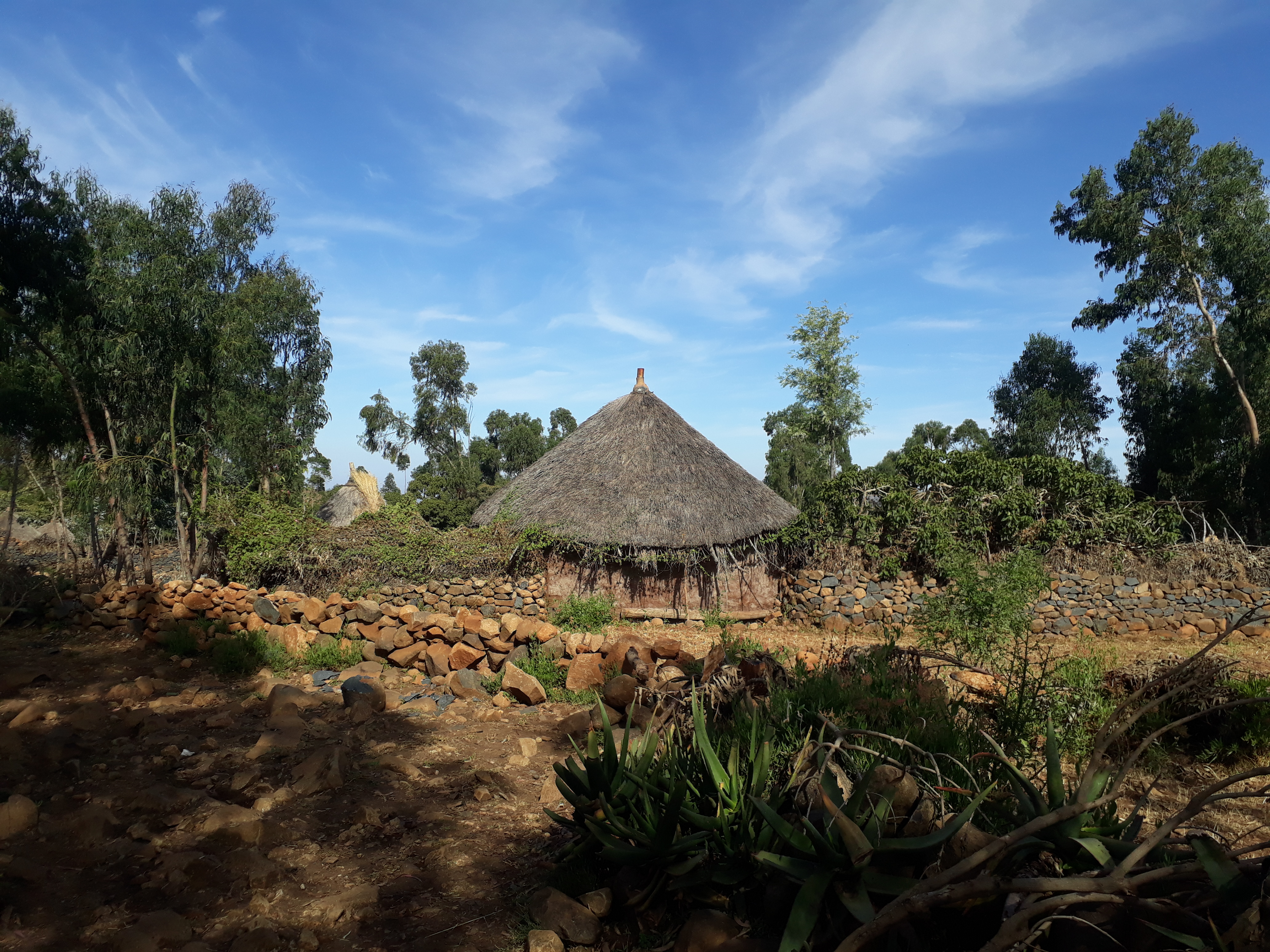
Thatched roofs in Kerene

The tabia centre of Kerene has a few administrative offices, a health post, a primary school and some small shops. There are a few more primary schools across the tabia. The other main populated places are:

- Tsilare
- Arefa
- Sibkere
- Gumuara

- Santarfa
- Debre Semayit
- Qeqema
- Yeresere

== Agriculture and livelihood ==
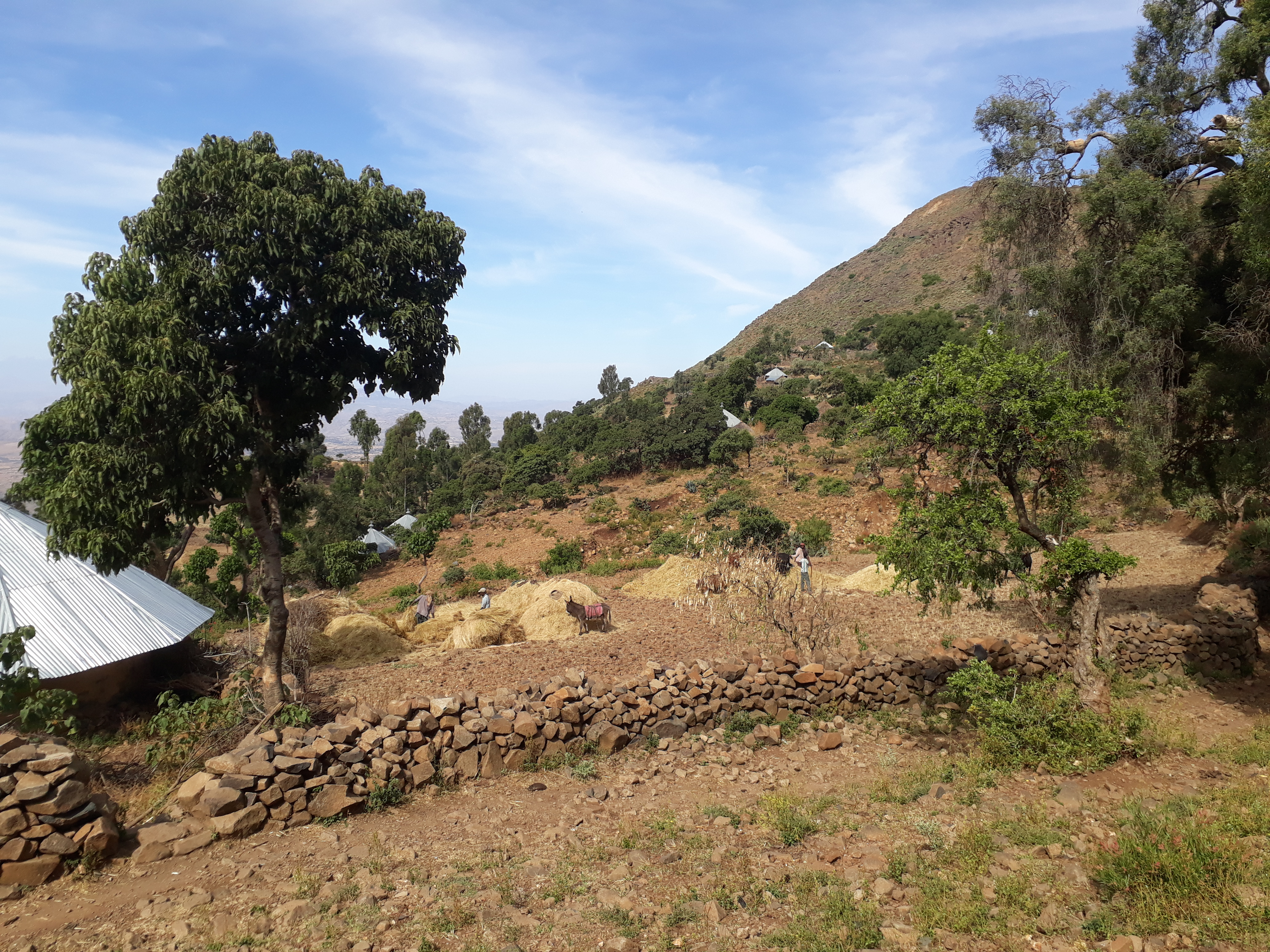
Threshing in Gumuara

The population lives essentially from crop farming, supplemented with off-season work in nearby towns. The plateau is dominated by farmlands on Vertisols which are clearly demarcated and are cropped every year. Hence the agricultural system is a permanent upland farming system. The farmers have adapted their cropping systems to the spatio-temporal variability in rainfall.

== History and culture ==
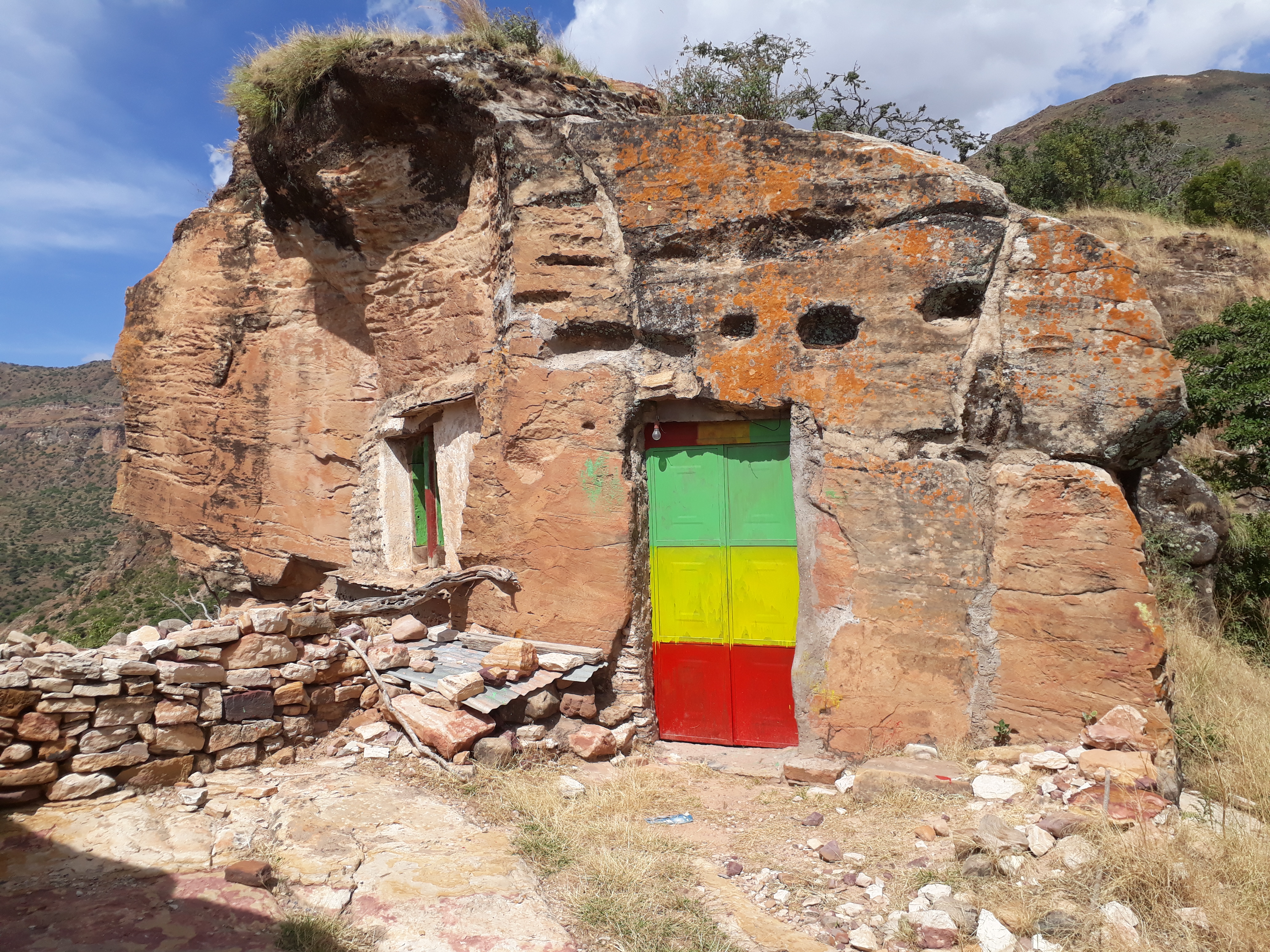
Debre Sema'it rock church

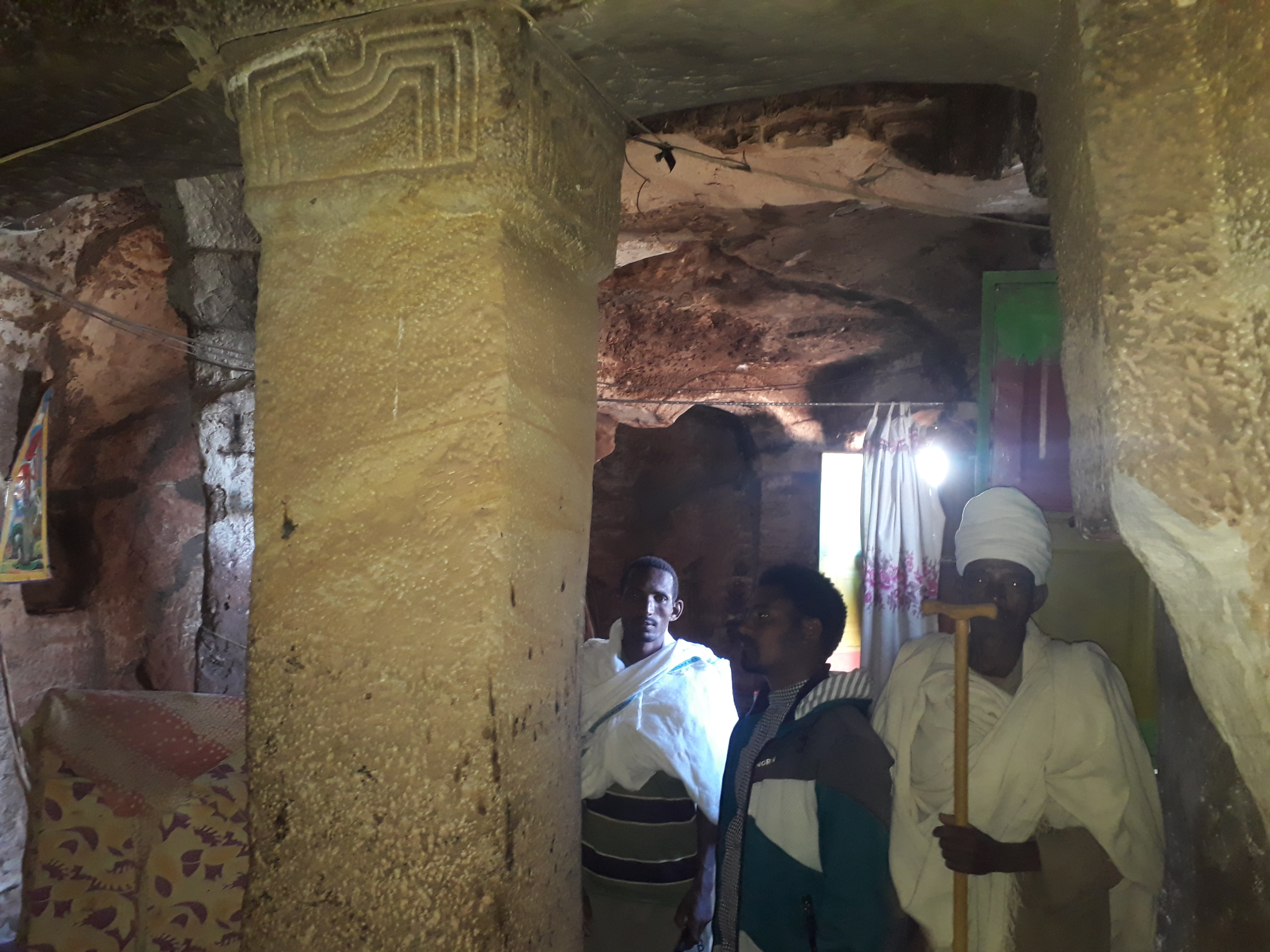
Inside Debre Sema'it rock church

=== History ===
The history of the tabia is strongly connected with the history of Tembien.

=== Religion and churches ===
Most inhabitants are Orthodox Christians. The following churches are located in the tabia:

- Medhane Alem
- Debre Sema'it Yohannes (rock church)
- Tsilare Mika'el
- Qeqema Maryam
- Yeresere Abune Ayezgi

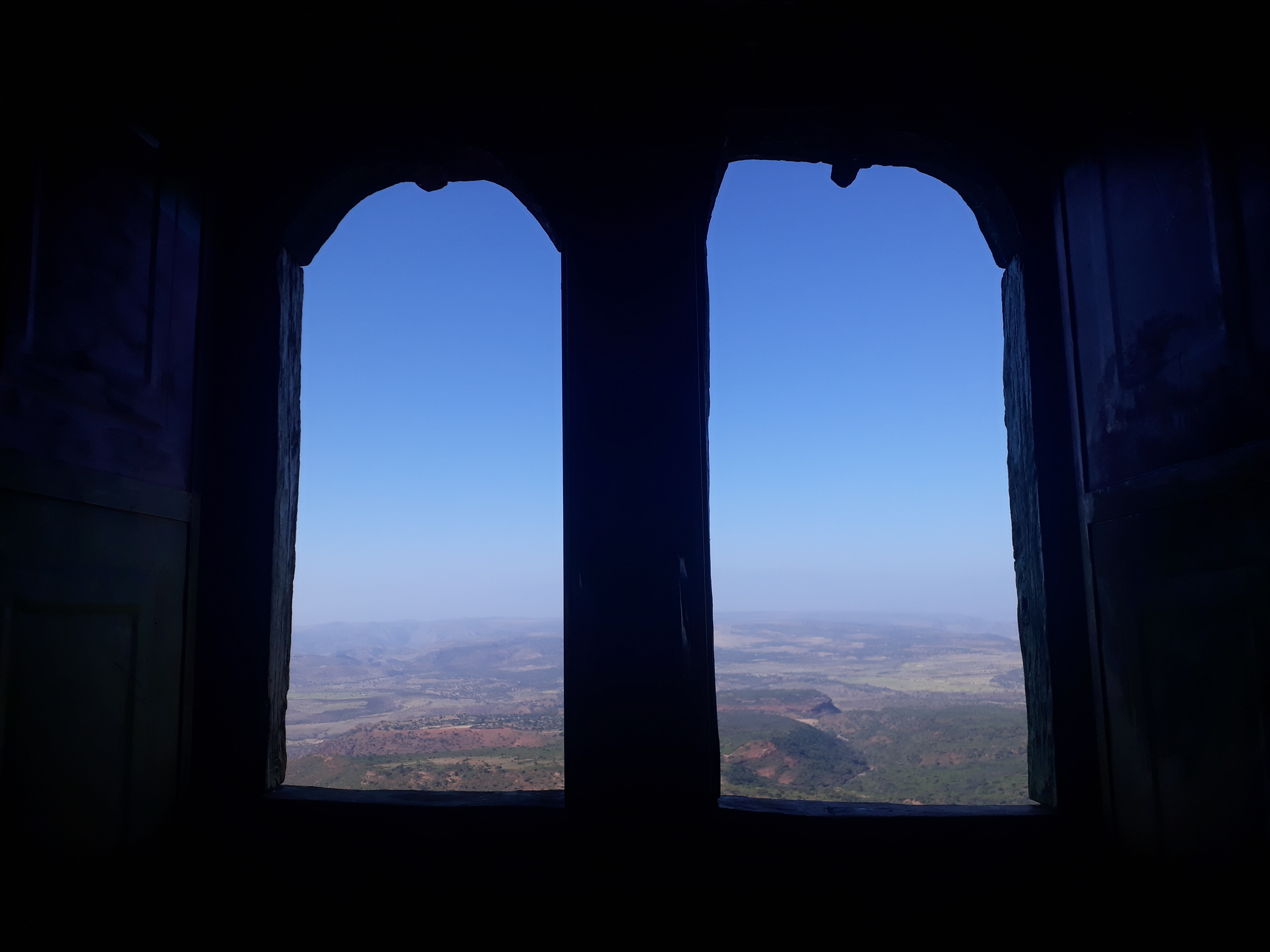
View from Debre Sema'it towards Abergele (woreda)

=== Legends and myths ===
Arefa, at the western side of the tabia and end of the Tsilere ridge, is reputedly the birthplace of the Queen of Sheba. The inhabitants have many legends about her, that all play in and around the rugged mountains of Dog'ua Tembien (Arefa, Megesta, Gelebeda).

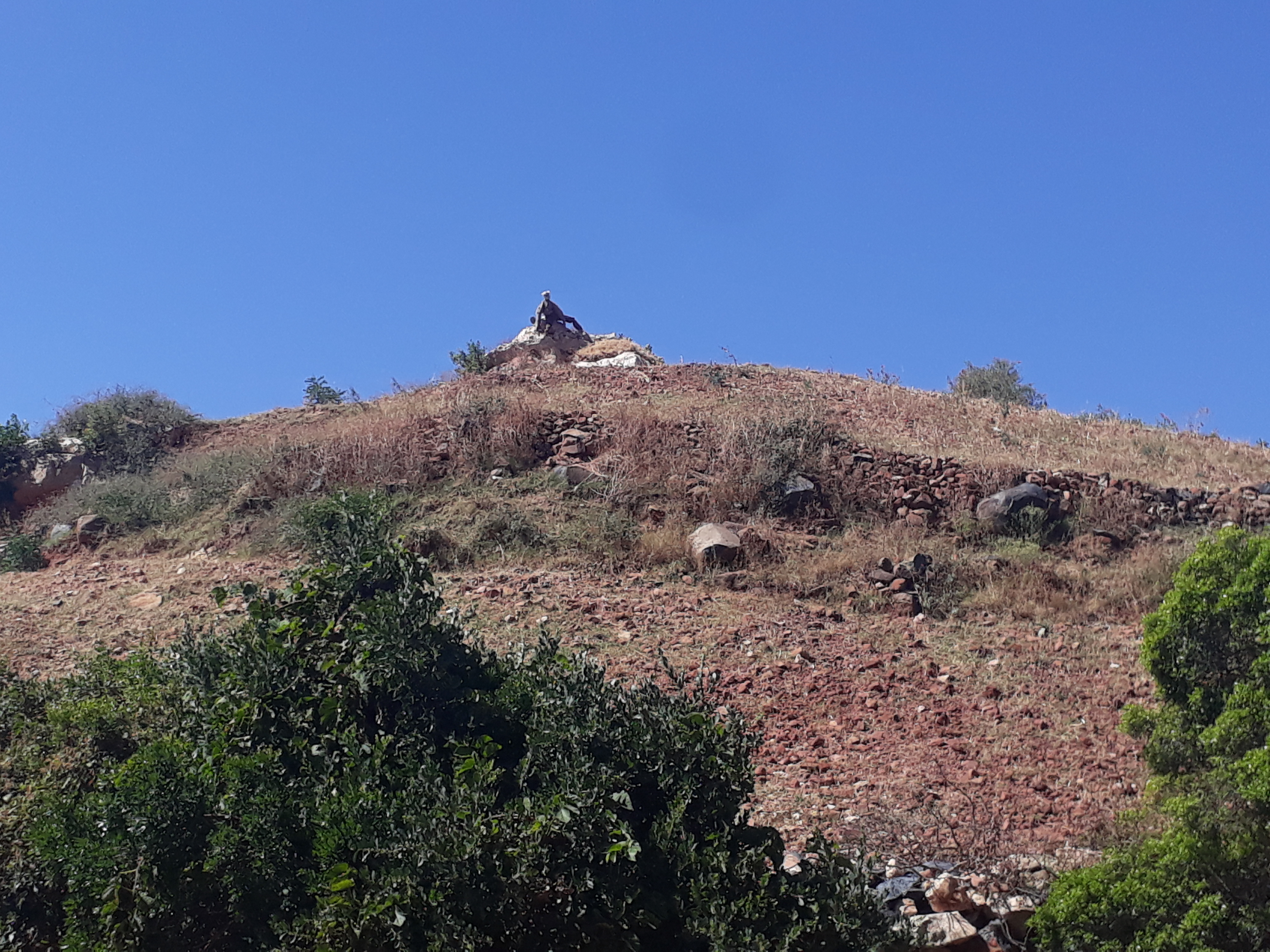
Monkey scarer in Debre Sema'it

=== Inda Siwa, the local beer houses ===
In the main villages, there are traditional beer houses (Inda Siwa), often in unique settings, where people socialise. Well known in the tabia are

- Letemariam Gebrekidan at Yeresere
- Letebrhan Gebreyohannes at Kerene

== Roads and communication ==
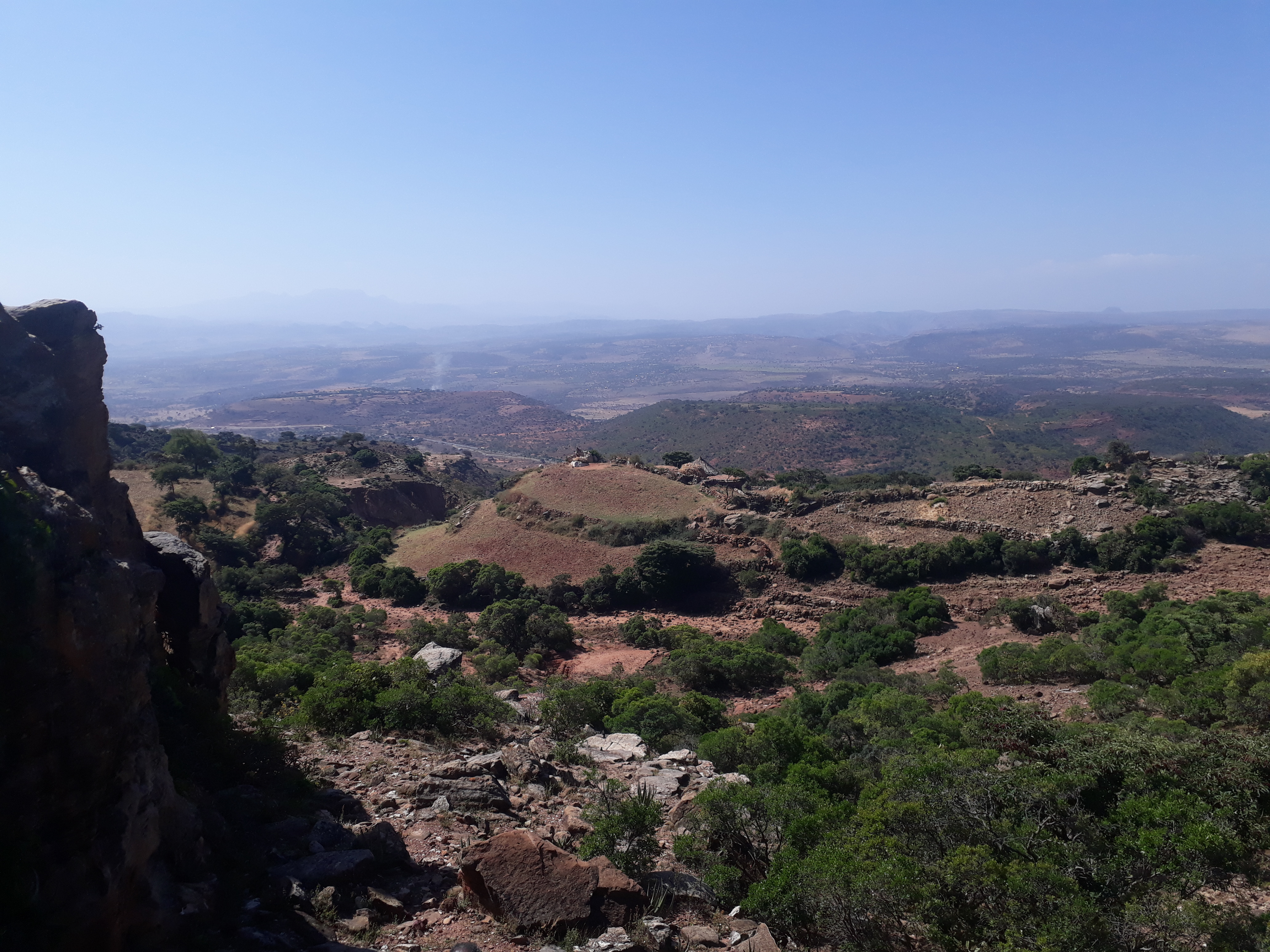
view from Debre Sema'it to Agbe lowlands

The main road from Mekelle via Hagere Selam to Abiy Addi runs through the eastern part of the tabia. There are regular bus services to these towns. Furthermore, a rural access road links Kerene to the main asphalt road.

== Schools ==
Almost all children of the tabia are schooled, though in some schools there is lack of classrooms, directly related to the large intake in primary schools over the last decades. Schools in the tabia include Yeresere school.

== Tourism ==
Its mountainous nature and proximity to Mekelle makes the tabia fit for tourism.

=== Touristic attractions ===
- The Yohannes rock church at Debre Sema'it (13°34.62′N 39°2.24′E) is located in the top of a rock pinnacle. This church has been hewn in Adigrat Sandstone.
- All along the top of the Tsilere ridge, when the sky is clear, there are good views towards the Simien Mountains, a hundred kilometres away, across Tekezze River.
- The Hagere Selam – Abiy Addi road passes along the foot of the Tsilere ridge, with good views to the escarpment, the Debre Sema'it rock church, and apses in the Adigrat sandstone.
- The high variability of geological formations and the rugged topography invite for geological and geographic tourism or "geotourism".

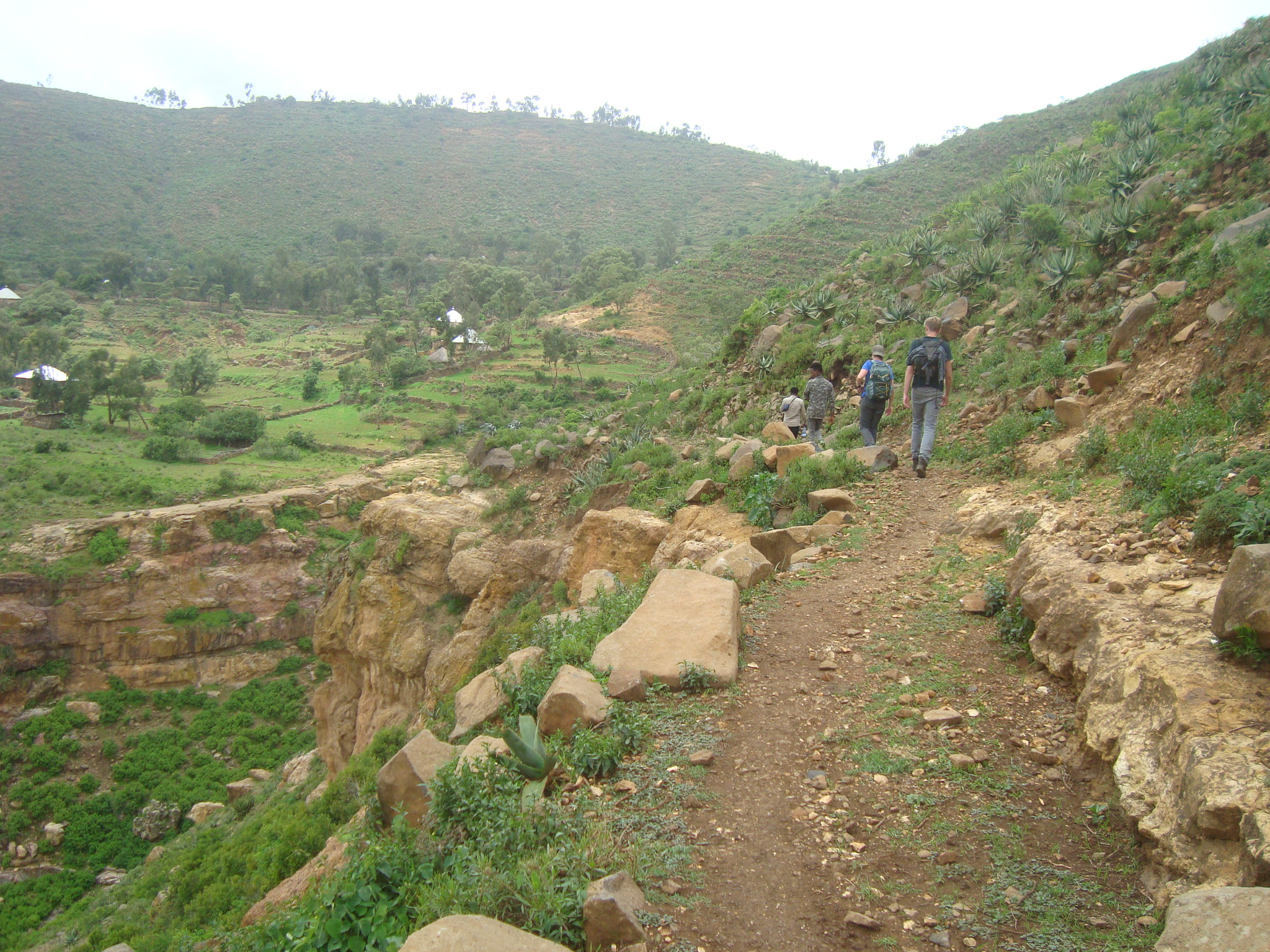
Along trekking route 7 in Gumuara

=== Trekking routes ===
Trekking routes have been established in this tabia. The tracks are not marked on the ground but can be followed using downloaded GPX files.

- Trek 7, is from Abiy Addi across Arefa to the Debre Sema'it rock church, and further along the Tsilare ridge to Inda Maryam Qorar
- Trek 19, from Agbe to Debre Sema'it, and then it continues along the same line as Trek 7

Both treks involve a vertical interval of more than one kilometer and require good physical conditions.

=== Accommodation and facilities ===
Though facilities are basic, the inhabitants are hospitable.

== See also ==
- Dogu'a Tembien district.
