= Monolithic church =

Church made up of single block of stone

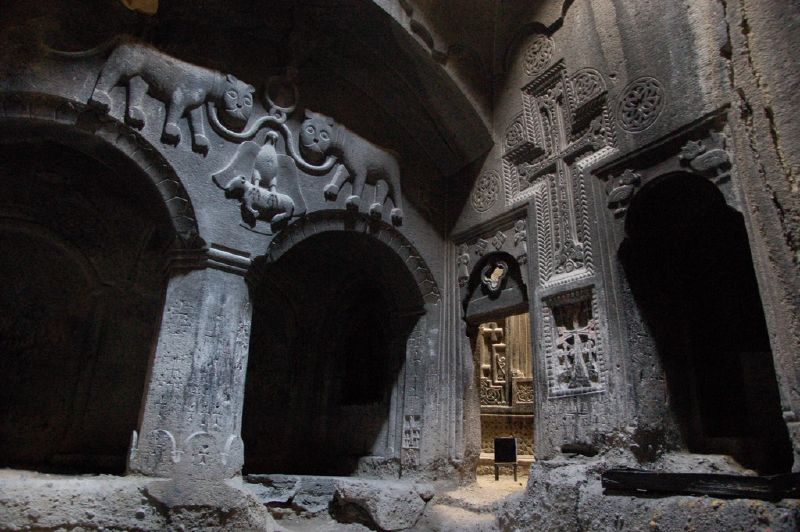
Geghard Monastery in Armenia, founded in 4th century

A monolithic church or rock-hewn church is a church made from a single block of stone. Because freestanding rocks of sufficient size are rare, such edifices are usually hewn into the ground or into the side of a hill or mountain. They can be of comparable architectural complexity to constructed buildings.

The term monolithic church is used of churches in various countries, not least the complex of eleven churches in Lalibela, Ethiopia, believed to have been created in the 12th century.

== Ethiopia ==
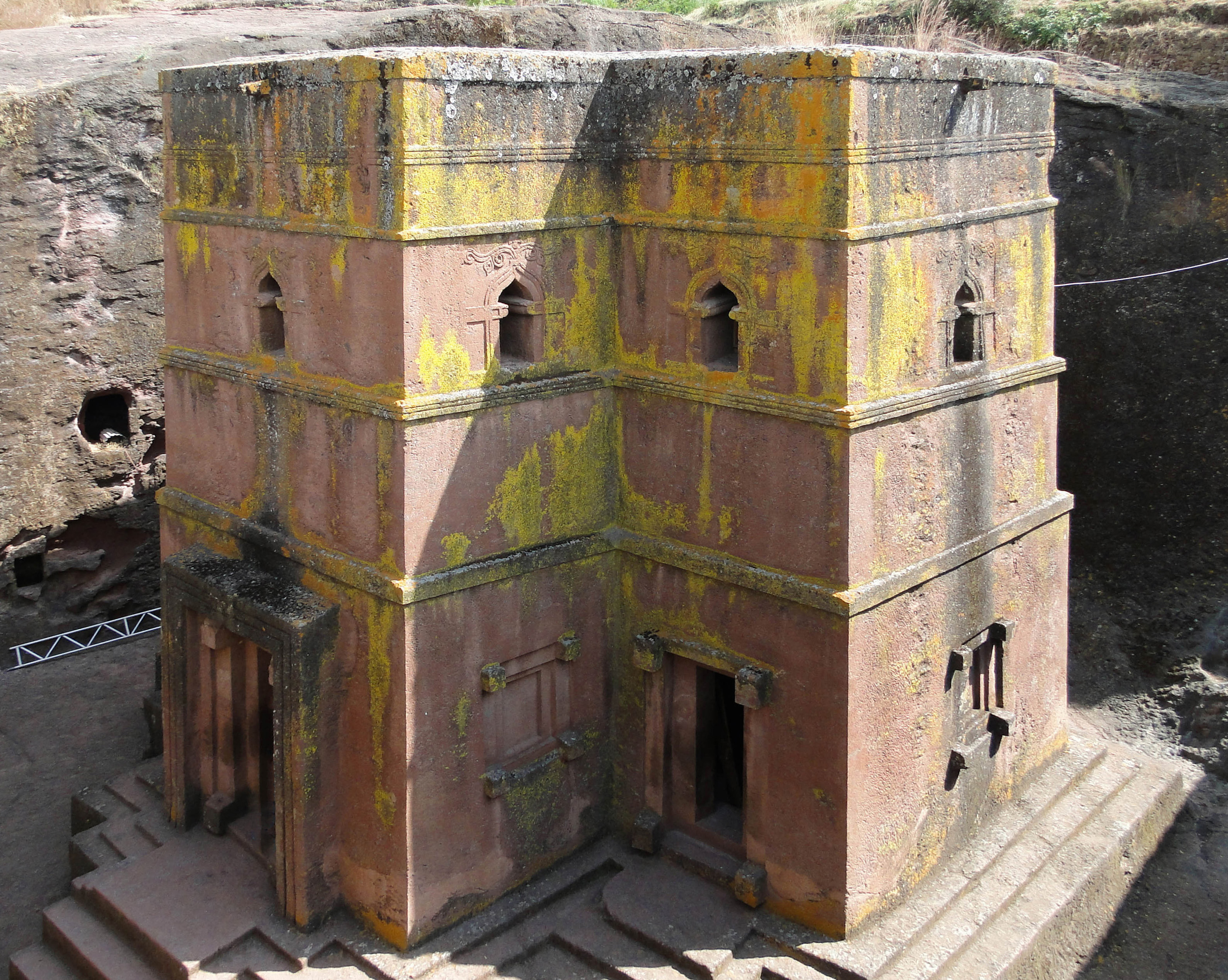
Bete Giyorgis (Church of St. George), Lalibela, Ethiopia

The eleven monolithic churches in Lalibela are:

- Church of the Redeemer
- Saint Marie
- Mount Sinai
- Golgotha
- House of the Cross
- House of the Virgins
- Saint Gabriel
- Abba Matta
- Saint Mercurius
- Immanuel
- Church of St. George (Bete Giyorgis)

The most famous of the edifices is the cross-shaped Church of St. George. Tradition credits its construction to the Zagwe dynasty King Gebre Mesqel Lalibela, who was a devout Orthodox Tewahedo Christian. The medieval monolithic churches of this 12th-century "New Jerusalem" are situated in a mountainous region in the heart of Ethiopia near a traditional village. Lalibela is an important center of Ethiopian Christianity, and even today is a place of pilgrimage and devotion. Lalibela is one of the world's heritage sites registered by UNESCO.

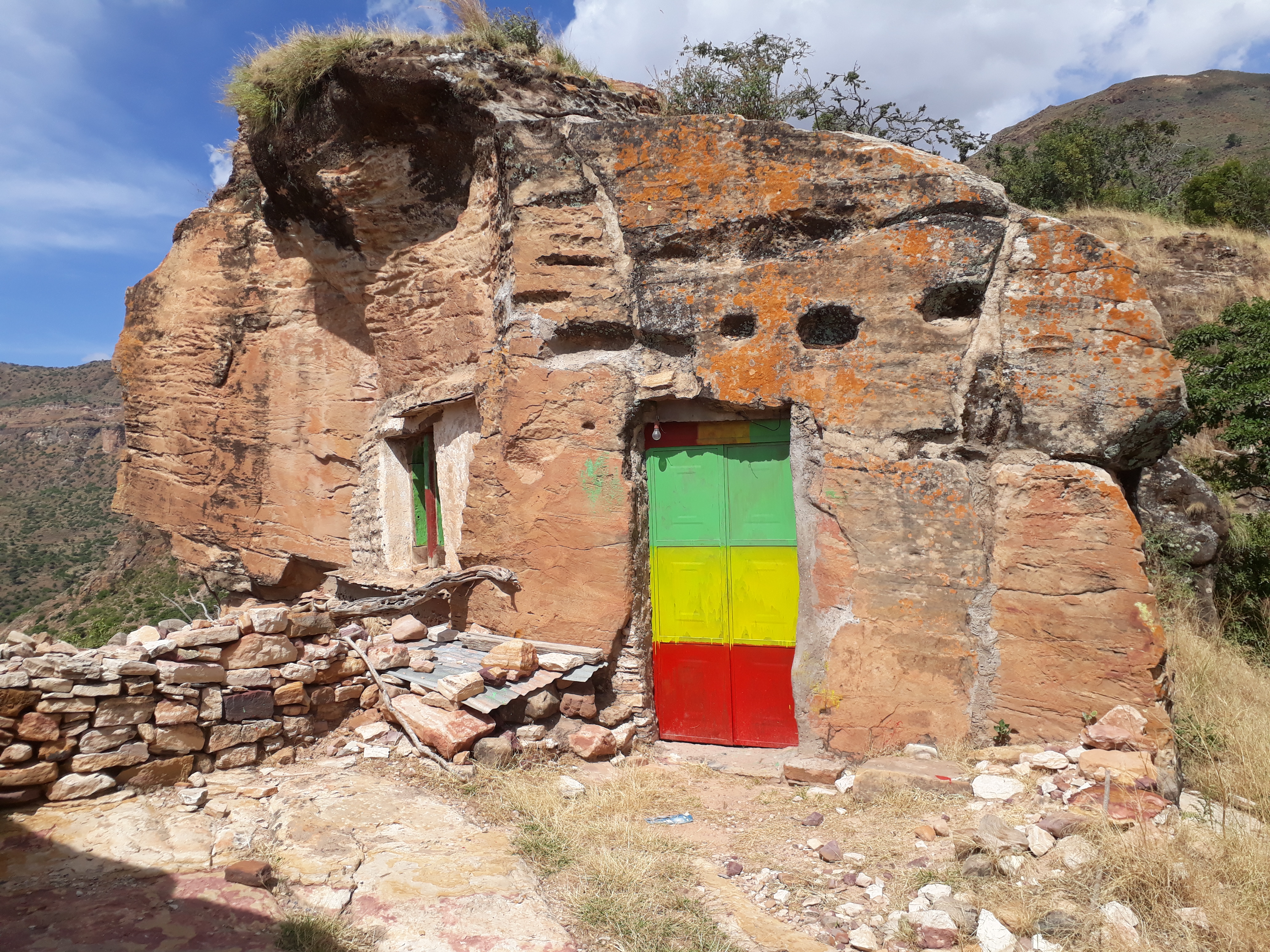
Debre Sema'it rock church

Many other churches were hewn from rock in Ethiopia, outside of Lalibela in Amhara Region. This practice was very common in Tigray, where the outside world knew of only a few such churches until the Catholic priest Abba Tewelde Medhin Josief presented a paper to the Third International Conference of Ethiopian Studies in which he announced the existence of over 120 churches, 90 of which were still in use. Despite Dr. Josief's death soon after his presentation, research over the next few years raised the total number of these rock-hewn churches to 153, particularly in the districts Kola Tembien, Degua Tembien, Hawzen and Sa'esa Tsada Amba.

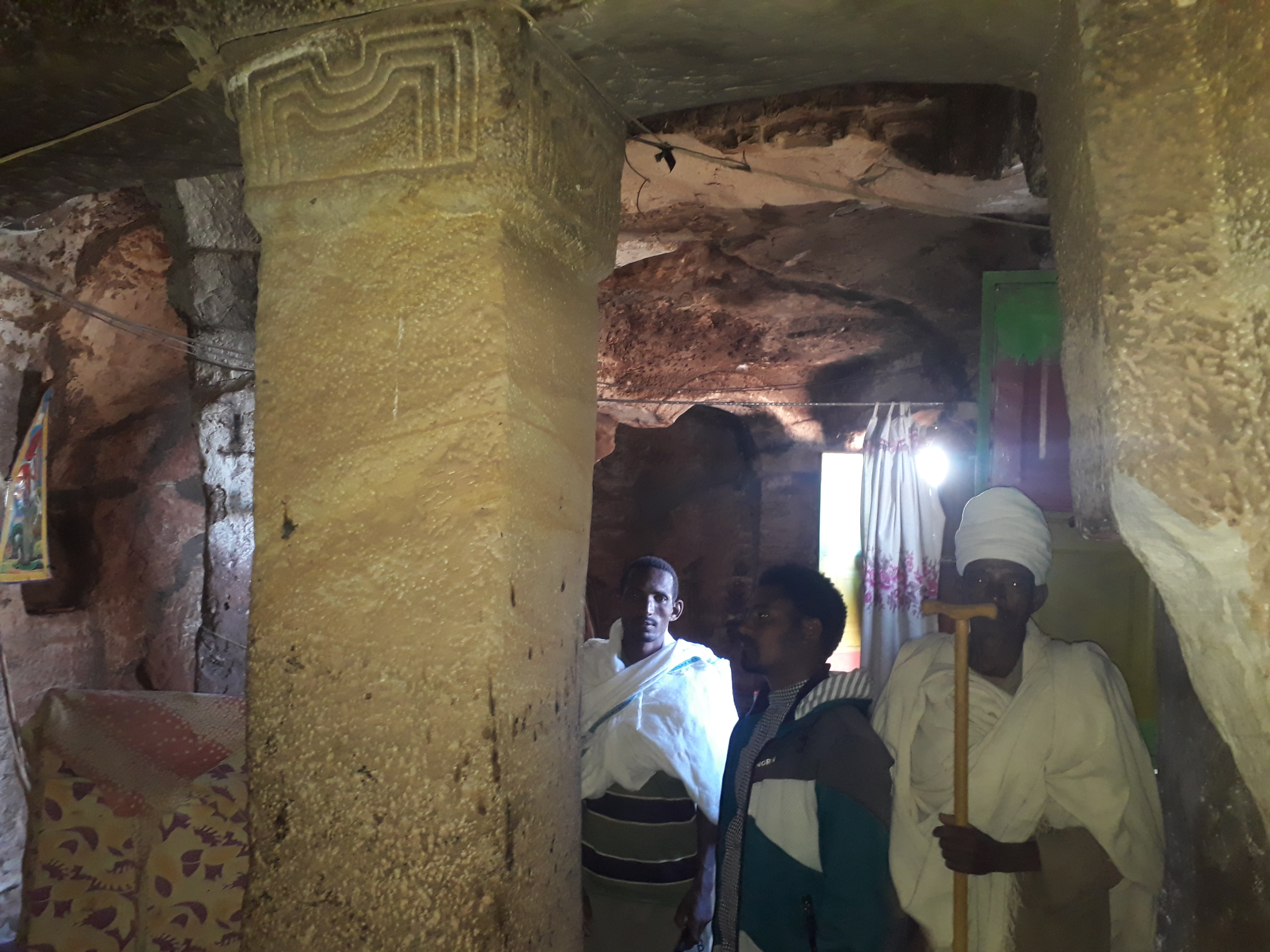
Inside Debre Sema'it monolithic church in Ethiopia

Their precise ages are not well defined but the majority were probably carved during the reigns of the emperors Dawit II (ca. 1380–1413 CE) and Zer’a Ya’iqob (1434–1468), and some possibly earlier when Anbessa Wudim (legendary date: 10th C.) or Yekuno Amlak (1270–1285) were in power. According to local belief excavation of the churches was started by a group of missionaries known as the 'Nine Saints', who arrived in Ethiopia from the Mediterranean region during the fifth or sixth century. Together with their Ethiopian followers these missionaries inspired a long tradition of monasticism, promoting isolation in remote and highly inaccessible locations such as those in which the rock-hewn churches are found. Preferred lithologies for church hewing were Adigrat Sandstone and Enticho Sandstone. The tradition continues up to the present, as rock-hewn churches are still being excavated today. Although the churches differ in design and structure, most consist basically of halls with a basilica architecture that includes three naves and a vestibule, pillars, vast ceilings, archways, and domes. Walls and ceilings are often decorated with rock carvings and colourful frescoes. Many of the medieval churches are still used today for Christian orthodox religious ceremonies and festivities.

== Other churches ==
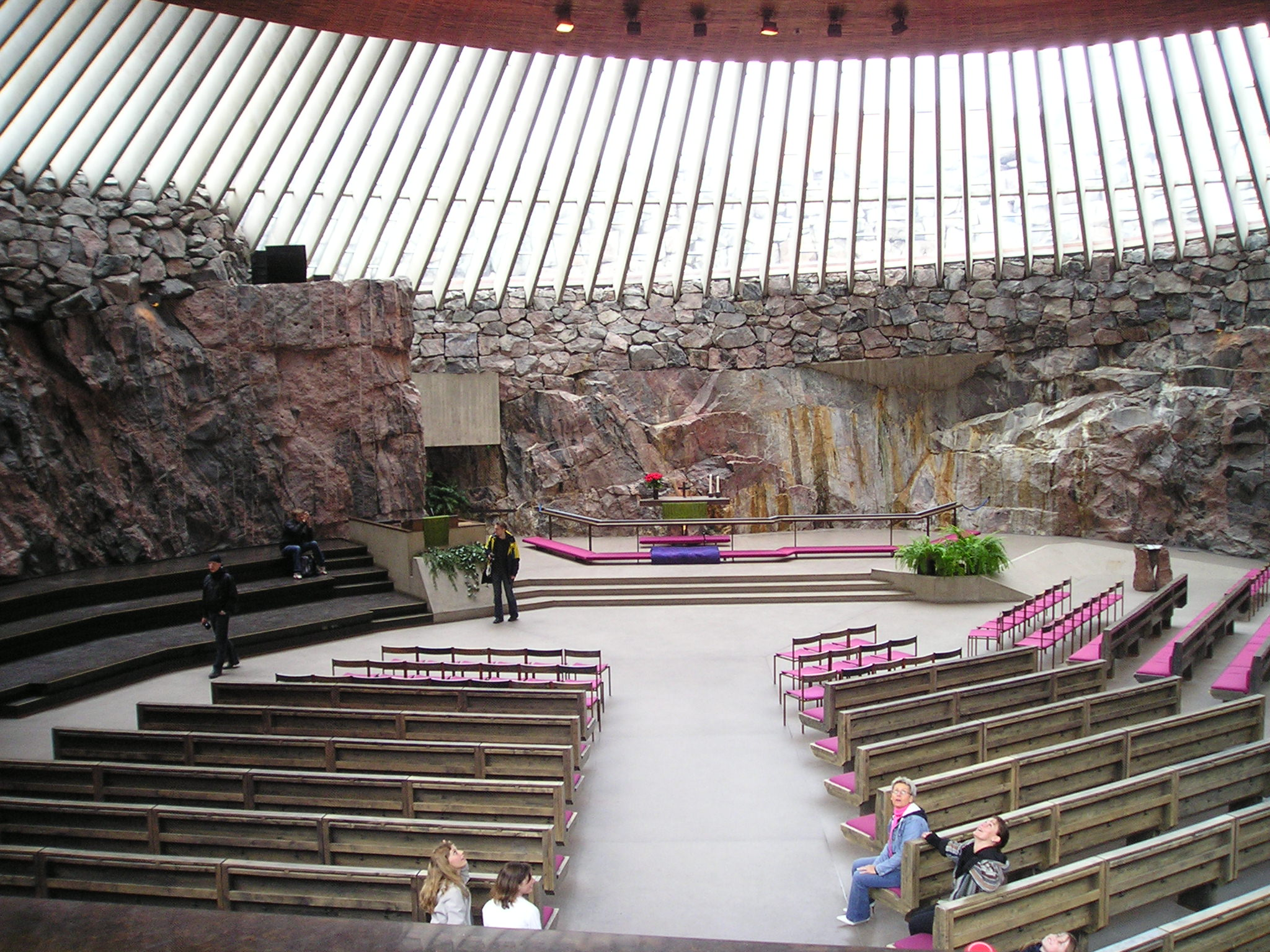
Temppeliaukio Church in Helsinki

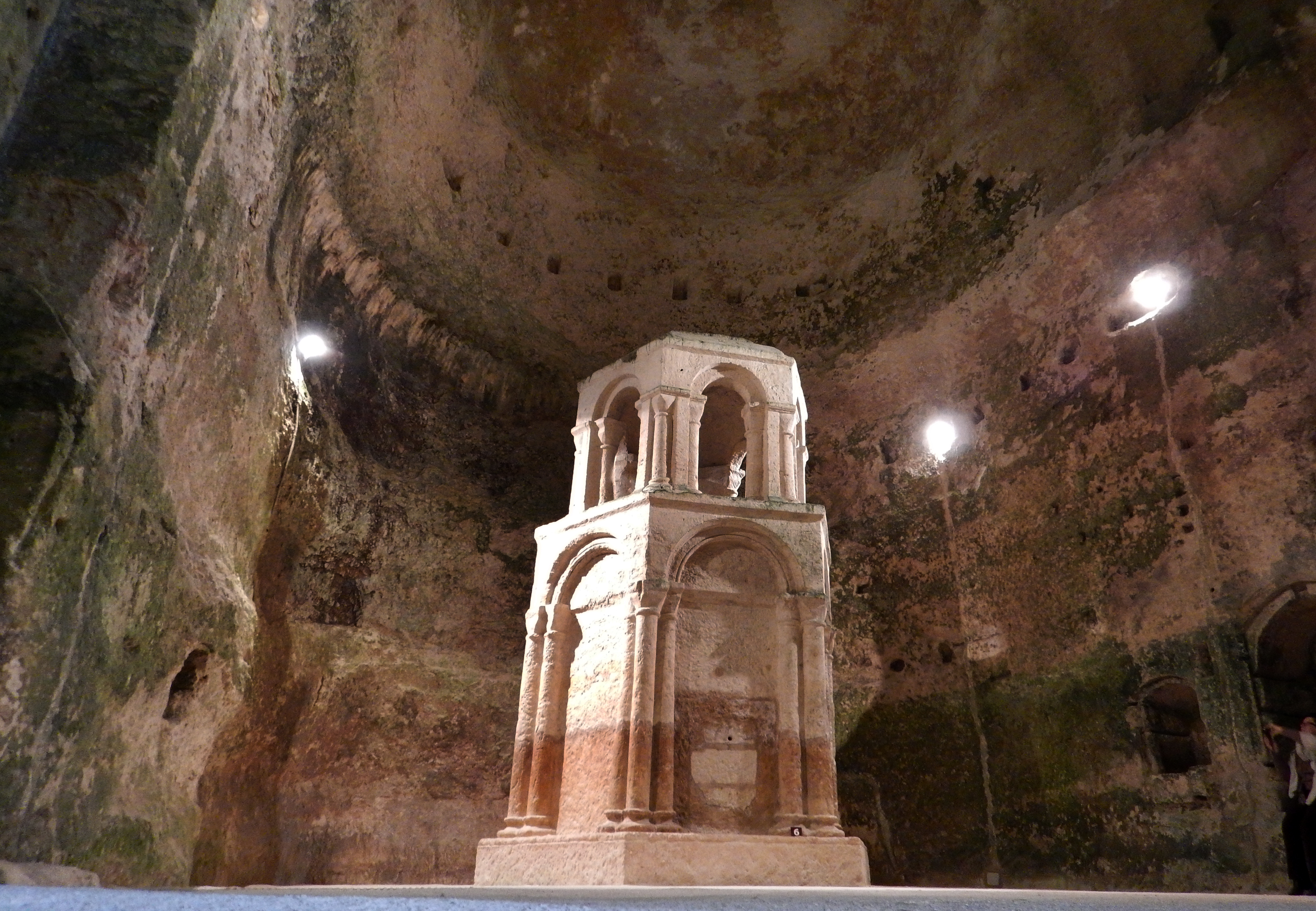
Monolithic church of Saint-Jean, Aubeterre-sur-Dronne, France

There are a number of monolithic churches elsewhere in the world. However, none have the free-standing external walls of the Lalibela churches. They instead more closely resemble cave monasteries in that they consist of tunnels converging into a single rock. Examples include:

- The Geghard monastery, Kotayk Province, Armenia
- The Rock-hewn Churches of Ivanovo, Bulgaria near Ruse
- The subterranean St. Jean Church in Aubeterre-sur-Dronne, France
- Church in Saint-Émilion, Saint-Émilion, France
- Temppeliaukio Church in Helsinki, Finland
- Church of Saint Peter, Antakya, Turkey
- The subterranean rock churches in Cappadocia, Turkey which number beyond one thousand and contain some superb examples of Byzantine wall-paintings, representing both the academic classicizing trend in Byzantine art, and some archaic popular styles

== See also ==
- Rock-cut architecture
- Monolithic architecture
- Wieliczka & Bochnia Salt Mine
- List of cave monasteries
- Petra
- Ellora Caves
- Chapelle Sainte Radegonde (Chinon)
