= Panzootic =

Animal disease that spreads across a large region

A panzootic (from Greek παν pan all + ζόιον zoion animal) is an epizootic (an outbreak of an infectious disease of non-human animals) that spreads across a large region (for example a continent), or even worldwide. The equivalent in human populations is called a pandemic.

A panzootic can start when three conditions have been met:

- the emergence of a disease new to the population.
- the agent infects a species and causes serious illness.
- the agent spreads easily and sustainably among animals.

A disease or condition is not a panzootic merely because it is widespread or kills a large number of animals; it must also be infectious. For example, cancer is responsible for a large number of deaths but is not considered a panzootic because the disease is, generally speaking, not infectious. Unlike an epizootic, a panzootic covers all or nearly all species over a large surface area (ex. rabies, anthrax). Typically an enzootic or an epizootic, or their cause, may act as a potential preparatory factor.

== Causes of spread and environmental influences ==
Contagion and infection by far play the biggest role in the dissemination and spread of epizootic and panzootic diseases. These include virulent (ex. Cattle Plague), septic (can be caused in the change in food quality), parasitic (ex. Malaria), and miasmatic infections (ex. Typhoid Fever). Many claim that an accidental morbific cause, which infects a great number of animals which ceases activity after a prolonged time period.

Certain factors come into play in the spread of certain panzootic diseases, as can be seen with Batrachochytrium dendrobatidis. This infection seems to be sensitive to external conditions, particularly the environment's temperature and moisture. These factors leads to limitations on where the diseases can thrive, acting almost as its ‘climate niche’.

== Examples ==
=== Persistence of H5N1 avian influenza ===
Influenza A virus subtype H5N1, the highly pathogenic strain of influenza, was first detected in the goose population of Guangdong, China in 1996.

In February 2004, avian influenza virus was detected in birds in Vietnam, increasing fears of the emergence of new variant strains. It is feared that if the avian influenza virus combines with a human influenza virus (in a bird or a human), the new subtype created could be both highly contagious and highly lethal.

In October 2005, cases of the avian flu (the deadly strain H5N1) were identified in Turkey. EU Health Commissioner Markos Kyprianou said: "We have received now confirmation that the virus found in Turkey is an avian flu H5N1 virus. There is a direct relationship with viruses found in Russia, Mongolia and China." Cases of bird flu were also identified shortly thereafter in Romania, and then Greece. Possible cases of the virus have also been found in Croatia, Bulgaria and in the United Kingdom. However, by the end of October only 67 people had died as a result of H5N1 which was atypical of previous influenza pandemics.

The enzooicity of H5N1 in birds, poultry in particular, has led to a major panzootic. As of 2012, there was an estimated 400 million birds killed from infection of the H5N1 strain of influenza. Studies have shown that H5N1 is very well adapted to domestic duck and geese, making them key in controlling the H5N1 strain and preventing future panzootic events.

Presently, the highly pathogenic Asian strain of Avian Influenza is still continuing to kill poultry and wild birds alike on panzootic scales. The persistence of such a pathogen in the environment would only lead to a further continuation of panzootic scale eliminations of birds. To try to control this, scientists did research involving the shed feathers of domestic ducks to test the prevalence of H5N1. Although viral persistence was notably found within drinking water and feces, the feathers exhibited the most remaining H5N1 strain for up to 160 days. The persistence exhibited through the feathers indicates the potential for environmental contamination of not only H5N1, but also other untested viruses.

=== White nose syndrome in bats ===
White Nose Syndrome (WNS) is a rapidly spreading fungal infection responsible for killing millions of bats within the past 9 years in United States and Canada. Geomyces-destructans is the causative fungal agent of the characteristic skin lesions seen on the exposed skin, particularly on wings and nose, and in the hair follicles of affected bats. WNS has only recently been discovered, in Howe's Cave, New York during the winter of 2006–2007, but affects 25% of the hibernating species. Six species of bats have been fatally effected by this panzootic; big brown bat, small-footed bat, little brown bat, northern long-eared bat, Indiana bat, and tricolored bat, and current bat population surveys suggest a 2-year population decline in excess of 75%. The geographical range of WNS has spread throughout 33 states, and 4 Canadian provinces.

The mechanism of how the infection on the skin kills bats is unclear. However, the outward cause of mortality of the infected bats depends on the stage and severity of the bat. Infected bats commonly die from starvation over winter, and can suffer from lasting damage to the wing membranes and impair summer foraging if survived the winter. One of the most abundant bat species in eastern North America, the little brown bat (Myotis lucifugus), could disappear from this region within 16 years.

Severely infected bats emerge prematurely from hibernation, and if they survive long enough and enter a different hibernaculum, the likelihood of transmission is probably high, because they presumably carry a large load of fungal spores. Transmission of the infection is either physically from bat-to-bat contact, or from and hibernaculum-to-bat, through the exposure to spores of Geomyces- destructans that were present on a roosting substrate.

=== Newcastle disease in pigeons ===
Newcastle disease is a contagious bird disease affecting many domestic and wild avian species. The disease is contagious through immediate contact between healthy birds and the bodily discharges of infected birds. This includes transmission through droppings, secretions from the nose, mouth and eyes. Newcastle disease spreads quickly among birds kept in captivity, such as commercially raised chickens. Symptoms include sneezing, gasping for air, nasal discharge, coughing, greenish and watery diarrhea, nervousness, depression, muscular tremors, drooping wings, twisting of head and neck, circling, complete paralysis, partial to complete drop in egg production and thin-shelled eggs, swelling of the tissues around the eyes and in the neck, and sudden death.

Newcastle disease was first identified in Java, Indonesia, in 1926, and in 1927, in Newcastle upon Tyne, England (whence it got its name). However, it may have been prevalent as early as 1898, when a disease wiped out all the domestic fowl in northwest Scotland. Its effects are most notable in domestic poultry due to their high susceptibility and the potential for severe impacts of an epizootic on the poultry industries. It is endemic to many countries. The emergence and spread of new genotypes across the world represents a significant threat to poultry. This suggests that the disease is continuously evolving, leading to more diversity (Miller et al., 2009).

Unfortunately, little has been done to comprehend the procedure and advancement of new genotypes (Alexander et al., 2012). Recent vNDV have been characterized as isolates and offer evidence which proposes an emergence of a fifth panzootic initiated by highly related vNDV isolates from Indonesia, Israel and Pakistan. These virus strains are related to older strains from wild birds. This suggests that unknown reservoirs harbor new vNDV isolates capable of additional panzootics.

No treatment for NDV exists, but the use of prophylactic vaccines and sanitary measures reduces the likelihood of outbreaks.

=== Chytrid fungus in amphibian populations ===
Chytridiomycosis caused by a chytrid fungus is a deadly fungal disease that has wiped out 30 amphibian species across the globe and has sent overall amphibian populations in decline. The fungus Batrachochytrium dendrobatidis can be found on every continent with fertile soil and has contributed to the loss of some species of frogs and salamanders. In fact, it is estimated that 287 species of amphibians are infected with this disease in over 35 countries. These countries tend to have varied or tropical climates like those found in Central America, South America, and Africa with optimal climate conditions ranging from 17 degree Celsius to 23 degrees Celsius for the fungus to thrive.

The first reported instance of the chytrid fungus was in 1998 which was found on the skin of amphibians. Since amphibians absorb essential nutrients through their skin, the fungus attaches itself to the amphibian, suffocates the amphibian, and enters the blood stream of the organism. Some symptoms that are prevalent in affected species include lethargy and loss of equilibrium and begin to die 21 days after infection. Frogs that have died and are examined show high density of the fungal spores in keratinized areas of the body such as the pelvis, mouth, and underbelly.

The fungus is spread through the transportation of amphibious species by humans. Infected amphibians that have escaped or are released into the wild can carry the fungus and therefore invade the surrounding habitats of local species that are not immune to the disease. Species like the American Bullfrog and African Clawed Frog can carry this disease without experiencing symptoms or death; these kinds of species are usually to blame for the spread of the disease in undeveloped habitats.

Some characteristics of amphibians that are more likely to be susceptible to the disease are the lack of various developed microbiota that live and breed on the dermis of the species as well the underdeveloped immune system in specific amphibians. Species that tend to breed in flowing water which washes away the microbiota from the skin of amphibians are more likely to become infected. Organizations across the world have tried to implement rules and regulations for the transportation of amphibians across borders to prevent the continued decline of amphibians however progress has been slow. To add to the slow progress, the only cure that exists for chytrid fungus is found within laboratories for amphibians in captivity. Because of this, there is no known way for eradicating the disease in the wild.

== See also ==
- Centers for Disease Control and Prevention (CDC)
- European Centre for Disease Prevention and Control (ECDC)
- Enzootic
- Epizootic
- Influenza pandemic
