= Avian metaavulavirus 2 =

Virus classification
- (unranked): Virus
- Realm: Riboviria
- Kingdom: Orthornavirae
- Phylum: Negarnaviricota
- Class: Monjiviricetes
- Order: Mononegavirales
- Family: Paramyxoviridae
- Genus: Metaavulavirus
- Species: Avian metaavulavirus 2

Synonyms
- Avian avulavirus 2; Avian paramyxovirus 2; Yucaipa paramyxovirus; Yucaipa virus

Species of virus

Avian metaavulavirus 2, formerly Avian paramyxovirus 2, is a species of virus belonging to the family Paramyxoviridae and genus Metaavulavirus. The virus is a negative strand RNA virus containing a monopartite genome. Avian metaavulavirus 2 is one of nine species belonging to the genus Metaavulavirus. The most common serotype of Avulavirinae is serotype 1, the cause of Newcastle disease (ND). Avian metaavulavirus 2 has been known to cause disease, specifically mild respiratory infections in domestic poultry, including turkeys and chickens, and has many economic effects on egg production and poultry industries. The virus was first isolated from a strain in Yucaipa, California in 1956. Since then, other isolates of the virus have been isolated worldwide.

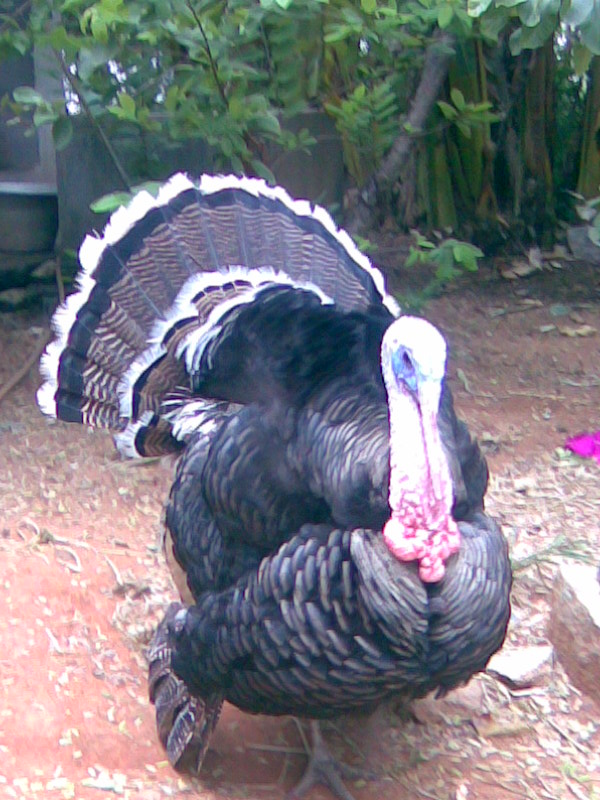
Domesticated poultry, including turkeys and chickens are the common host of Avian metaavulavirus 2. Upon infection, turkeys usually present mild respiratory symptoms and reduced egg production

== Viral classification ==
Avian metaavulavirus 2 is a negative sense RNA virus with a monopartite genome. It belongs to Group V of the Baltimore Classification System of viruses.

== Structure ==
All Paramyxovirus virus particles are composed of a ribonucleoprotein core and a lipoprotein bilayer. Avian paramyxoviruses contain a viral envelope that encapsulates a spherical viral capsid containing the negative-sense RNA genome. The members of the Paramyxoviridae family, including Avian metaavulavirus 2, follow the 'rule of six,' having a genome length that is a multiple of six. This allows for proper packing of the genome in the nucleocapsid. The structure of the envelope is characterized by the spike-like projections of two viral proteins, the fusion protein (F) and hemagglutinin-neuraminidase (Hn) protein. However, these protein projections may differ between the nine serotypes of avian paramyxoviruses. The matrix protein (M) is believed to form the inner layer of the envelope and interacts with the F and Hn proteins on the outside of the viral envelope during viral entry.

== Genome ==
Avian metaavulavirus 2 has a negative-sense RNA genome that upon entry into the cell, must be transcribed into a positive-sense mRNA in order to produce viral proteins and to replicate the genome. It has been hypothesized by electron microscopy, that the genome assumes a left-handed helical structure. The genome size of an isolated Yucaipa strain, isolated from chickens in Yucaipa, California in 1956, is 14,904 nucleotides long and contains a leader sequence of 55 nucleotides at the 3' end and a trailer sequence of 154 nt at the 5'end. However, other isolated strains of Avian metaavulavirus 2 have been isolated that contain genomes of similar, but different, lengths. Avian metaavulavirus 2 is one of the smallest in the Paramyxoviridae family. The genome encodes six viral proteins that are separated from each other via intergenic regions that are between 3-23 nucleotides long. The six viral genes are surrounded by regions of transcription stop and start signals that aid in transcription of the genome and production of subgenomic RNAs. The viral genomes of most paramyxovirus serotypes encode genes for a nucleocapsid protein (N), a phosphoprotein (P), a matrix protein (M), a fusion protein (F), a hemagglutinin-neuraminidase (Hn) protein and a large polymerase protein (L).

== Replication cycle ==
=== Attachment and entry ===
A common feature of all paramyxoviruses is the presence of two membrane-anchored glycoproteins, one required for virion attachment and one required for fusion. It is believed that the F and Hn proteins present on the outer envelope of the virus assist in entry of the virus into the host cell. The fusion protein (F) is an integral membrane protein, sharing many features similar to other viral fusion proteins and is directly involved in virus fusion. It is believed that two heptad repeat regions (HR1) and (HR2) form a six-helix bundle structure that helps to induce fusion of the viral membrane with the host cell membrane. The Hn protein is made up of a stalk and a globular head that contains receptor-binding capabilities that bind to sialic acid receptors located on cells in the upper respiratory tract of the host. It is hypothesized that interactions between the Hn and F proteins cause conformational changes in the respective proteins controlling the attachment and fusion of the viral capsid with the host cell membrane.

=== Viral replication and production of viral protein ===
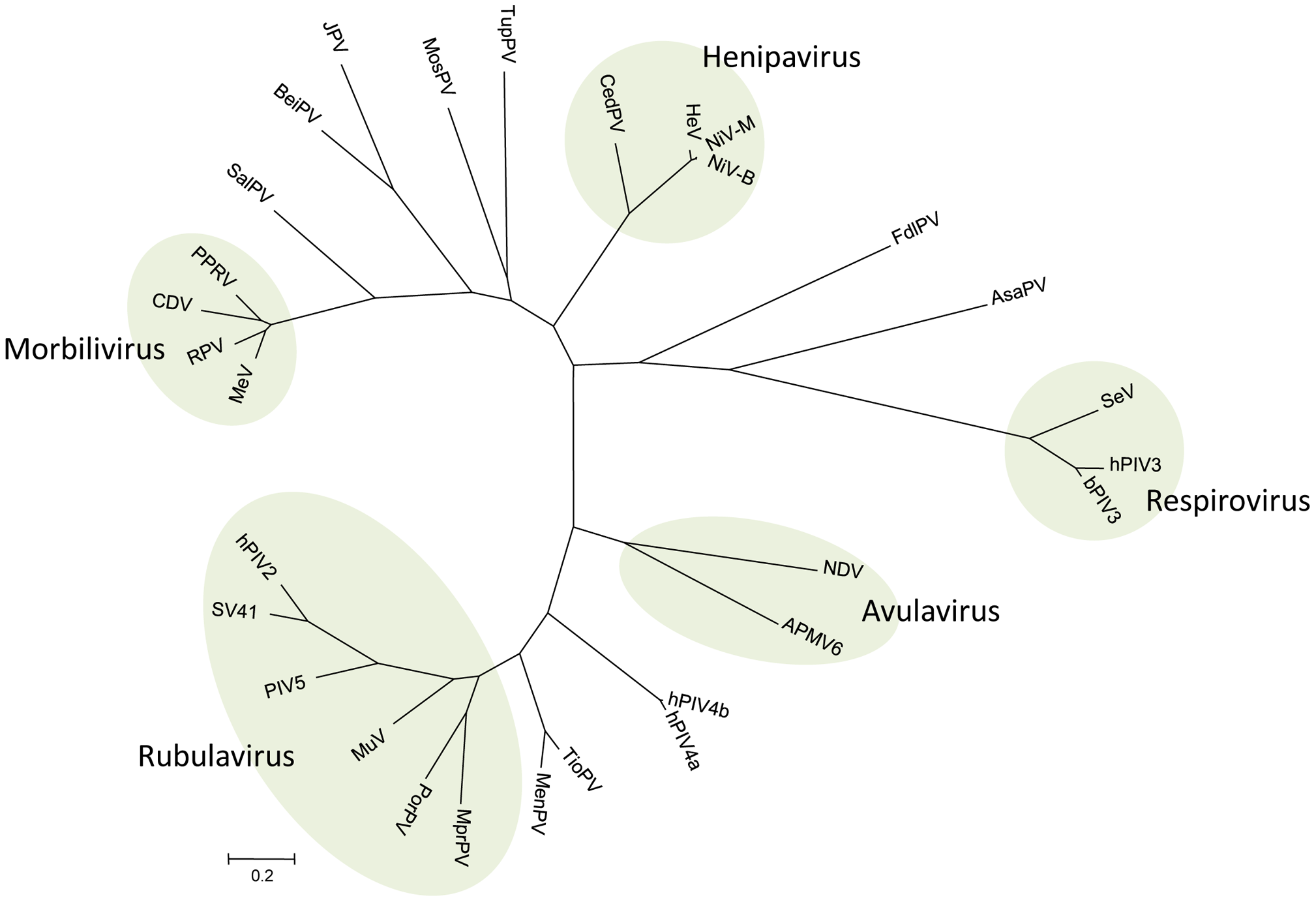
Avian paramyxoviruses fall under the genus Avulavirus, along with Newcastle disease in the family Paramyxoviridae.

Paramyxoviruses only encode one RNA polymerase and it is believed that replication takes place in the cytoplasm of the cell, with no involvement or entry into the host cell nucleus. Little is understood as to how the polymerase assists in both viral replication and transcription and how these processes can be regulated. The encoded polymerase consists of two proteins, a large subunit responsible for RNA synthesis and capping, and the encoded protein phosphoprotein (P) which acts as a cofactor. As described, the viral genome includes intergenic regions between the viral genes with specific start and stop signals. The polymerase recognizes these cis-acting elements within the viral genome and initiates transcription. Transcription first begins at the 3' end of the genome at a 40-55 nucleotide long promoter region. The polymerase produces subgenomic RNAs by transcribing each gene, releasing the produced RNA and then locating the next gene for transcription by the cis-acting elements present in the genome. The signal at which the polymerase releases the transcribed RNA of a single gene is believed to contain a Poly U tract, leading to the capping of a poly(A) tail to the transcribed RNA. In contrast to producing viral mRNA for viral protein synthesis, when replicating the viral genome, the polymerase does not start and stop at the indicated cis-acting elements between each gene. Instead, the polymerase elongates the RNA along the entire length of the genome. Described above is one model for the hypothesized viral replication and protein production of paramyxoviruses, however, other models exist that suggest the polymerase initiates replication and transcription at different areas in the genome.

=== Assembly and release ===
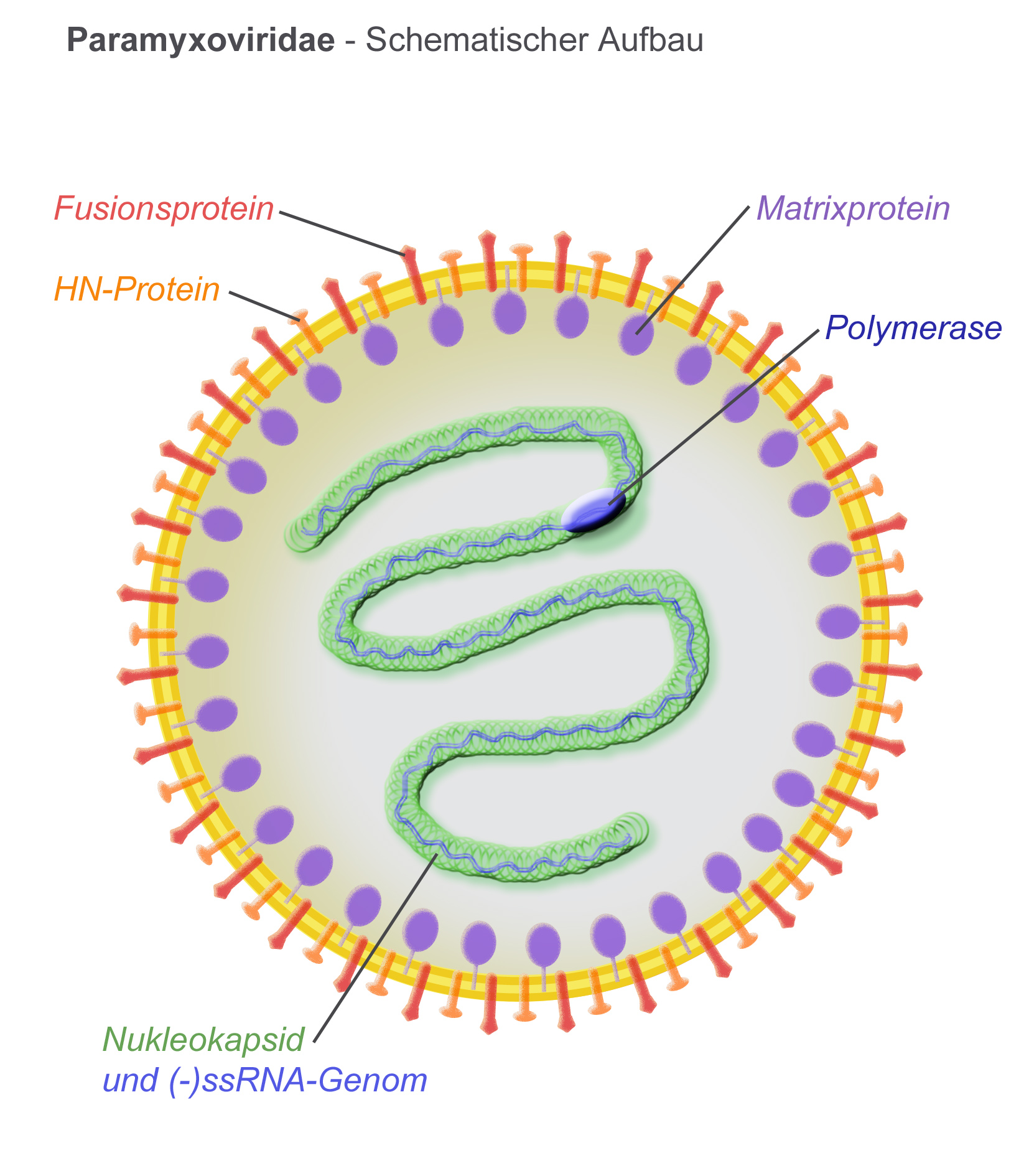
A general model of paramyxoviruse structure including a spherical capsid that is enveloped and identified by two viral proteins, the hemagglutinin-neuraminidase protein (Hn) and a fusion protein (F). All paramyxoviruses assume this general capsid structure, however, they may differ in the proteins present on the envelope.

It is believed that the matrix protein (M) on the inner face of the viral envelope plays a major role in the budding of virus-like particles from the infected host cell. The M protein interacts with the Hn and F proteins, helping to incorporate these proteins into viral particles for release. It has been hypothesized that matrix proteins of paramyxoviruses interact with the host vacuolar protein sorting system to initiate budding of the host cell membrane. The interactions of the Hn, F and M proteins are not well understood, however, it is believed that paramyxovirus assembly and release relies on protein-protein interactions and specific targeting of proteins to areas of the host cell and membrane

== Interactions with host ==
In cell culture, many paramyxoviruses express a cytopathic effect by syncytium formation, the fusion of infected cells with neighboring cells producing a large multi-nucleated cell. However, certain serotypes of avian paramyxovirus do not show syncytium formation, only cell rounding. Studies have shown that upon infection, microscopic lesions form in the trachea, lungs and, more rarely, in the gut of animal models infected with Avian metaavulavirus 2. It has also been shown that model birds infected with isolates of Avian metaavulavirus 2 experience diarrhea and show enlarged pancreas.

== Tropism ==
Avian metaavulavirus 2 is believed to infect tissues of the respiratory tract and in some cases, tissues of the lungs. The viral envelope protein, Hn, binds to sialic acid residues present in cells in the upper respiratory tract. It has been found that in chickens, some may present mild respiratory symptoms or be asymptomatic. It is believed that more severe symptoms including sinusitis and a decrease in egg production occurs in turkeys. Other symptoms including reduced hatchability and infertility of eggs has been reported.

== Virus distribution ==
Avian metaavulavirus 2 has reservoirs in feral avian species and is known to cause respiratory disease and have economic impacts on egg production and poultry industries The natural hosts of Avian metaavulavirus 2 include turkeys and passerines. However, other hosts include chickens, rails and psittacines. Avian metaavulavirus 2 has been reported in birds in Europe, Asia and North and South America. In the US, it has been shown that the virus more likely infects turkeys than chickens. Isolates of Avian metaavulavirus 2 have been recovered from areas in the US, Bulgaria, Costa Rica, Africa and many other places, signifying that Avian metaavulavirus 2 occurs worldwide.

== Transmission and control ==
Transmission occurs slowly between domesticated turkey flocks in the United States and the mode of transmission is not well defined. It is hypothesized that infections of Avian metaavulavirus 2 in domesticated poultry stem from interactions with infected wild birds. Preventative measures can be taken to prevent spread of Avian metaavulavirus 2 in domesticated flocks. Such prevention measures include minimizing interactions between flocks and wild birds by bird proofing areas where poultry are housed and raised and good sanitation practices. No human infections have been reported of Avian metaavulavirus 2
