= Sylvatic plague =

Infectious bacterial disease

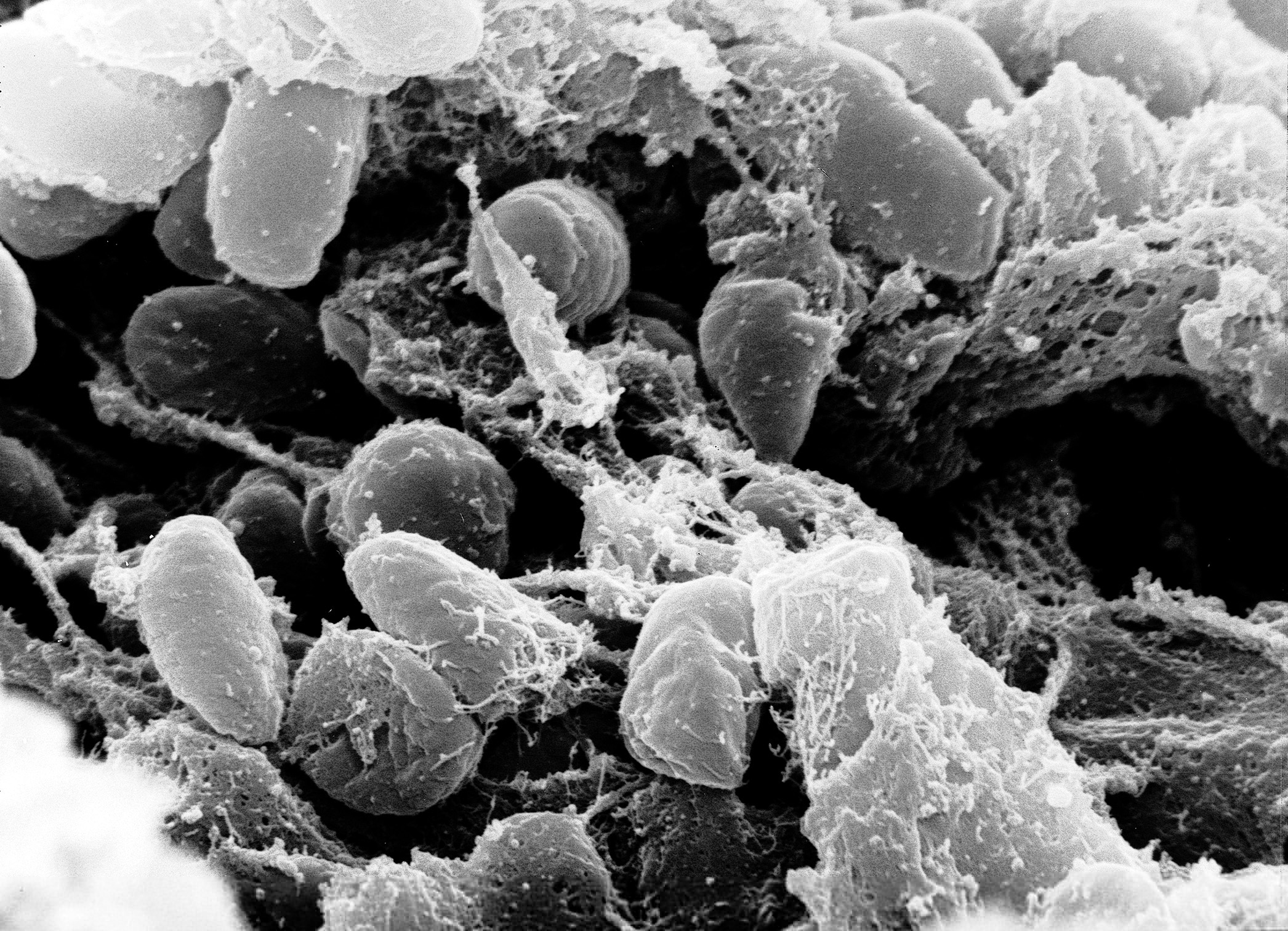
Scanning electron microphotograph depicting a mass of Yersinia pestis bacteria (the cause of bubonic plague) in the foregut of the flea vector

Sylvatic plague is an infectious bacterial disease caused by the plague bacterium (Yersinia pestis) that primarily affects rodents, such as prairie dogs. It is the same bacterium that causes bubonic and pneumonic plague in humans. Sylvatic, or sylvan, means 'occurring in woodland,' and refers specifically to the form of plague in rural wildlife. Urban plague refers to the form in urban wildlife.

It is primarily transmitted among wildlife through flea bites and contact with infected tissue or fluids. Sylvatic plague is most commonly found in prairie dog colonies and some mustelids, like the black-footed ferret.

== Transmission vector ==
The flea that feeds on prairie dogs and other mammals serves as the vector for transmission of sylvatic plague to the new host, primarily through flea bites, or contact with contaminated fluids or tissue, through predation or scavenging. Humans can contract plague from wildlife through flea bites and handling animal carcasses.

== Epidemiology and distribution ==
Yersinia pestis circulates in rodent reservoirs on all continents except Australia. Sylvatic plague affects over 50 species of rodents worldwide. It is vectored by a variety of flea species. Non-rodent animals susceptible to the disease include shrews, lagomorphs, ferrets, badgers, skunks, weasels, coyotes, domestic dogs and cats, bobcats, cougars, camels, goats, sheep, pigs, deer, and primates, including humans. Birds are not known to be susceptible.

Sylvatic plague is normally enzootic, meaning it occurs at regular, predictable rates in populations and specific areas. At unpredictable times, it becomes epizootic in unexpected places. It is during these epizootic outbreaks that transmission to humans is most common.

Factors that predispose to epizootic cycles include dense populations of rodents, multiple species of rodents in a particular area, and multiple rodent species in diverse habitats.

Prairie dog colonies reach nearly 100% mortality rates during outbreaks. Prairie dogs are a keystone species and play a vital role as the primary prey of black-footed ferrets. Developing methods to control plague is of high concern for preserving ferrets and the conservation of Western prairie and grassland ecosystems.

== Wildlife disease control and prevention ==
In the absence of understanding the prairie dog/plague cycles, dusting rodent dens with pesticides to kill fleas is currently the main method of controlling sylvatic plague in the wild, with some interest in using vaccines developing.

An oral live vaccine for prairie dogs was developed by the U.S. Geological Survey, National Wildlife Health Center, from a recombinant raccoonpox virus expressing plague antigens. It was originally developed by a Fort Detrick company in 2003 which showed it protected mice against lethal plague.

== See also ==
- Black Death
- Grasshopper mouse
- Sylvatic cycle
- Epizootic
