= Sylvatica =

sylvatica or silvatica meaning things pertaining to forests, may refer to:

- 8972 Sylvatica, a main-belt asteroid
- sylvatic, a scientific term referring to diseases or pathogens affecting wild animals
- sylvatic cycle, a portion of the natural transmission cycle of pathogens
