= PPMV1 =

Pigeon paramyxovirus type 1

Virus classification
- (unranked): Virus
- Realm: Riboviria
- Kingdom: Orthornavirae
- Phylum: Negarnaviricota
- Class: Monjiviricetes
- Order: Mononegavirales
- Family: Paramyxoviridae
- Genus: Avulavirus
- Species: Avian Avulavirus 1
- Virus: Pigeon paramyxovirus type 1

Species of virus

PPMV1 or pigeon paramyxovirus type 1 is a virus closely related to Newcastle disease which affects domestic pigeons and other bird species. It probably originated in the Middle East but has spread to Europe, the USA and Australia, where it has the potential to infect and kill native bird species.

== In Australia ==
Pigeon paramyxovirus was first detected in Victoria in 2011, in NSW in 2012 and in Tasmania in 2013. It is now considered endemic in Australia.

=== Impact ===
Potential ecological impacts include the transmission of a frequently fatal disease in many bird species worldwide, not just pigeons. Overseas it has infected raptors, pheasants, swans and cockatoos. In Australia, the virus has predominantly infected introduced pigeons but one native species has been diagnosed with the disease - a collared sparrowhawk which presumably ate a diseased introduced pigeon. With introduced pigeons so widely distributed, scientists are concerned about the further spread to native birds in Australia and nearby Papua New Guinea, which together house the world’s most diverse native pigeon and dove fauna - a quarter of the world’s total.

=== Biosecurity ===
Experts are concerned that there has been a lack of national contingency planning to prevent the entry and spread of Pigeon paramyxovirus in Australia. Although a vaccine to prevent the spread of the virus exists - and is utilised overseas, Australian authorities have reportedly not accessed this vaccine quickly enough.

== Evolution ==
The variant PPMV-1 virus is thought to have originated in the Middle East in the late 1970s, with the putative first isolation being made from meat pigeons in Iraq in 1978. The virus then spread to Italy and North Africa, onwards across Europe and progressively throughout the rest of the world.

There were clusters of isolates often formed from viruses isolated over a number of different years. The basis for this clustering is unclear; it could be a product of regional contact and spread within individual groups or federations of pigeon keepers. Every effort has been made to ensure that the selection of viruses included in this study is representative of the circulating PPMV-1 strains; however, because available data are derived from those cases that are reported and investigated, it seems inevitable that some sampling bias may be present and influence the phylogenetic tree topology.

== Reception ==
Because the nature of the disease in birds, the disease have been called as the "Zombie Pigeon" in são paulo after cases in 2022.
