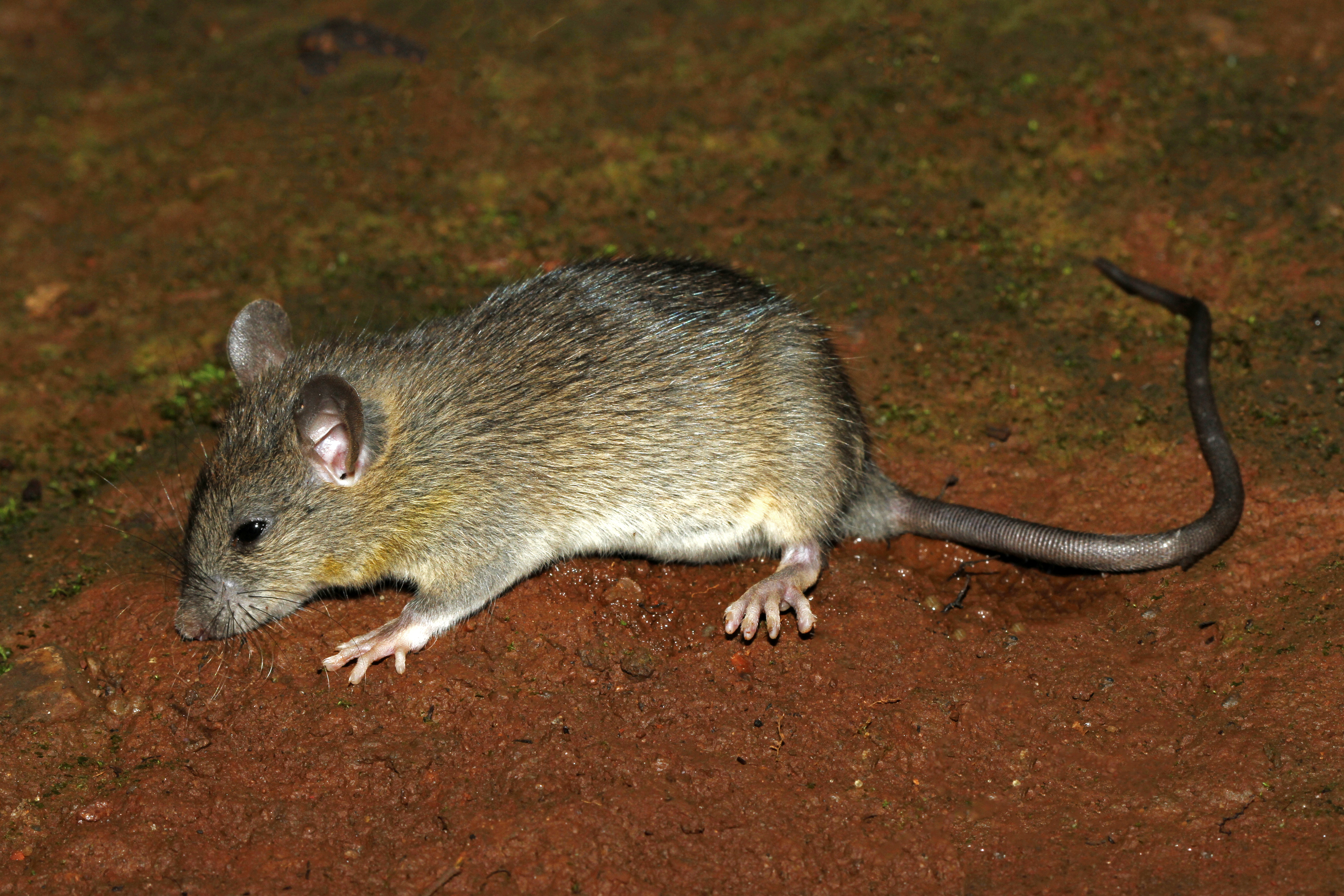
- Black rat in India

Conservation status
- Least Concern (IUCN 3.1)

Scientific classification
- Kingdom: Animalia
- Phylum: Chordata
- Class: Mammalia
- Order: Rodentia
- Family: Muridae
- Genus: Rattus
- Species: R. rattus

Binomial name
- Rattus rattus (Linnaeus, 1758)
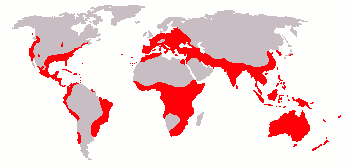

Synonyms
- Mus rattus Linnaeus, 1758

= Black rat =

Black rat Temporal range: Holocene

Species of rodent

The black rat (Rattus rattus), also known as the roof rat, ship rat, or house rat, is a common long-tailed rodent of the stereotypical rat genus Rattus, in the subfamily Murinae. It is a generalist omnivore that can live on a wide variety of foods. It associates extensively with humans, and most populations are synanthropic. It likely originated in the Indian subcontinent, but is now found worldwide.

The black rat is black to light brown in colour with a lighter underside. It is a prominent pest to farmers because it feeds on a wide range of agricultural crops. It is sometimes kept as a pet, though most domestic rats are a subspecies of the brown rat. In parts of India, it is considered sacred and respected, notably at the Karni Mata Temple in Deshnoke.

== Taxonomy ==
Mus rattus was the scientific name proposed by Carl Linnaeus in 1758 for the black rat. Prior to 1881, the genus Mus included both rat and mouse species, but after 1881 rat species were assigned to the genus Epimys, in addition to the more modern Rattus classification.

== Description ==
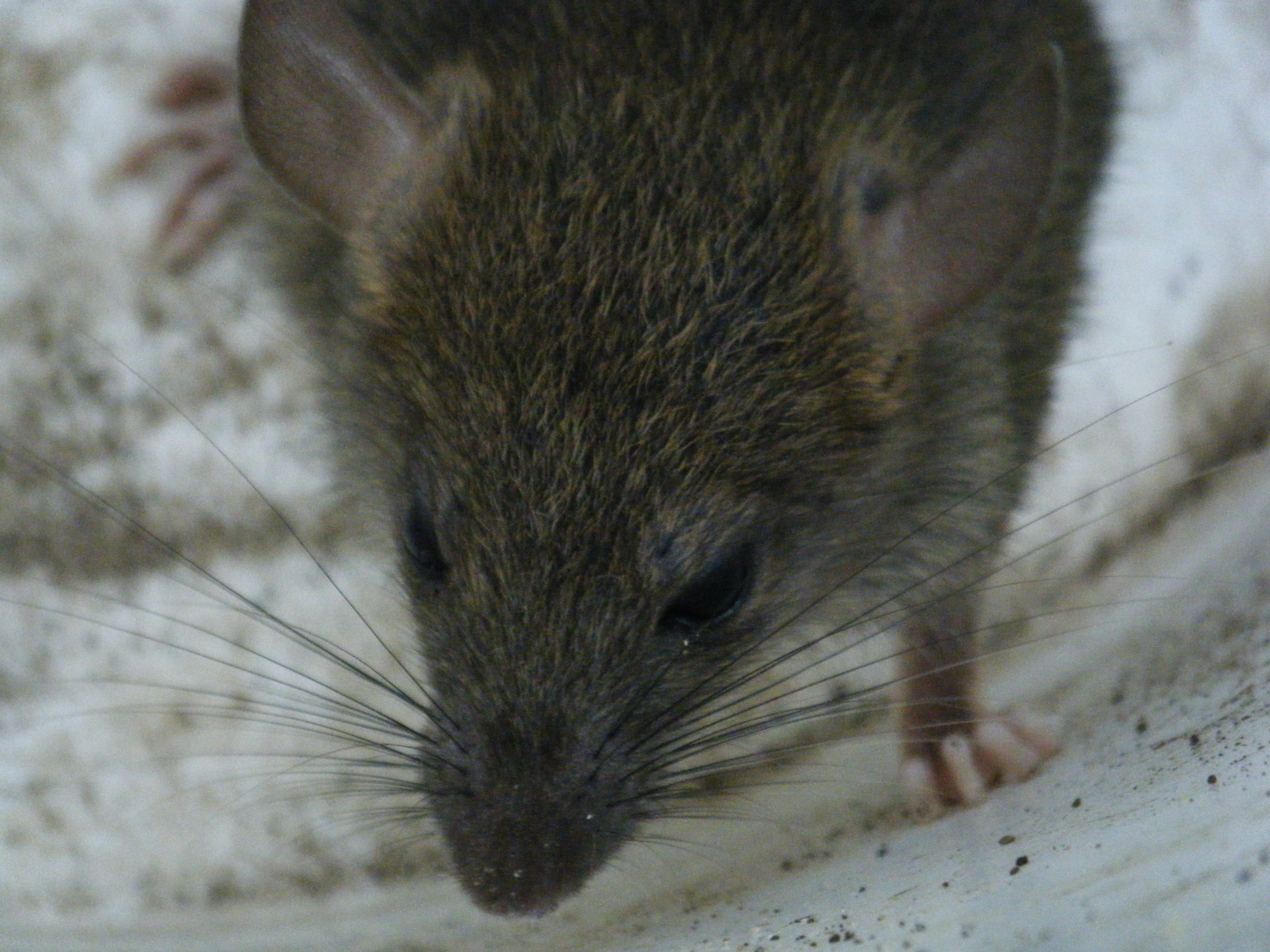
Closeup of the head of a black rat

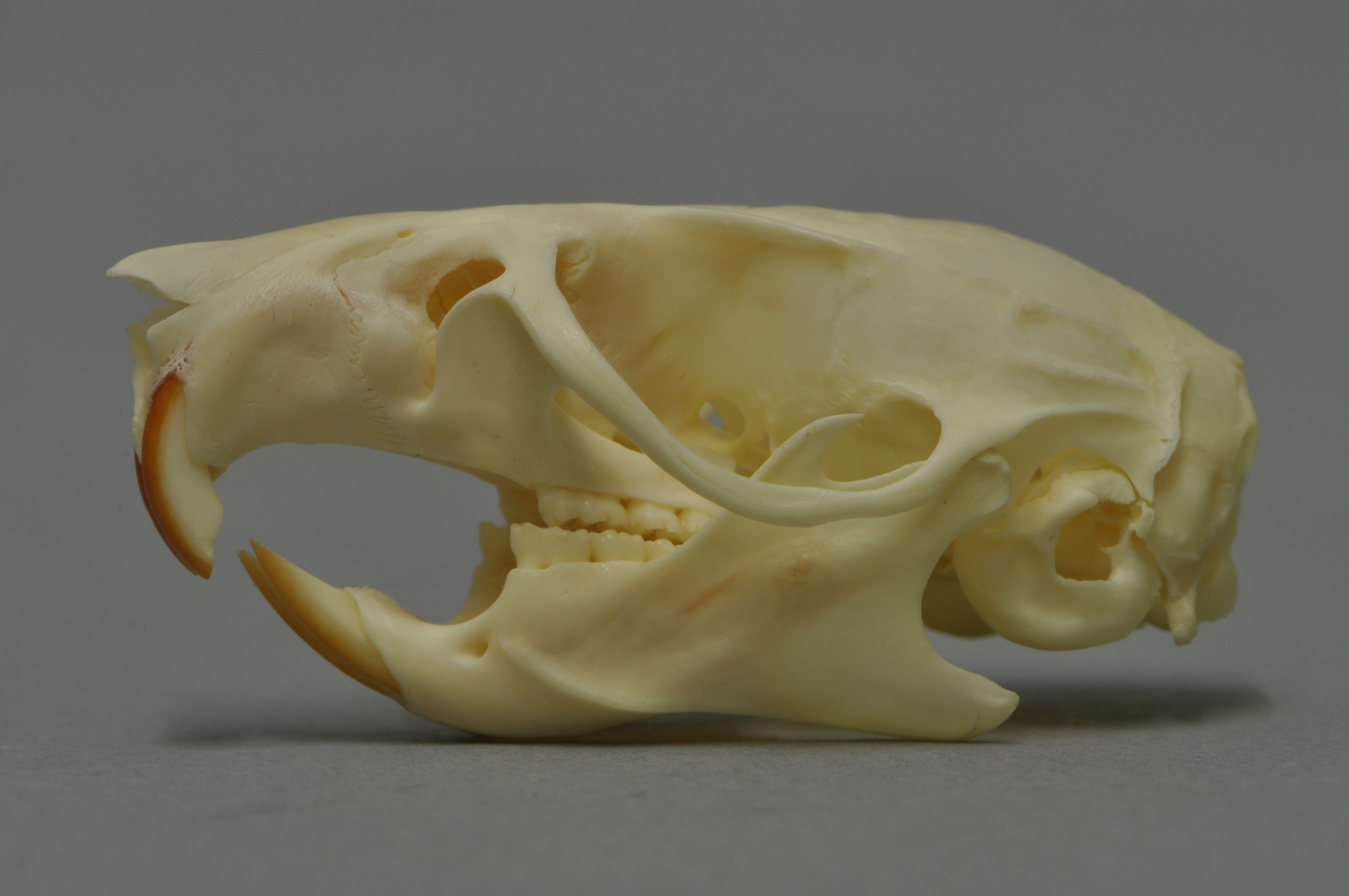
Skull of a black rat

Comparison of physique with a brown rat (Rattus norvegicus)

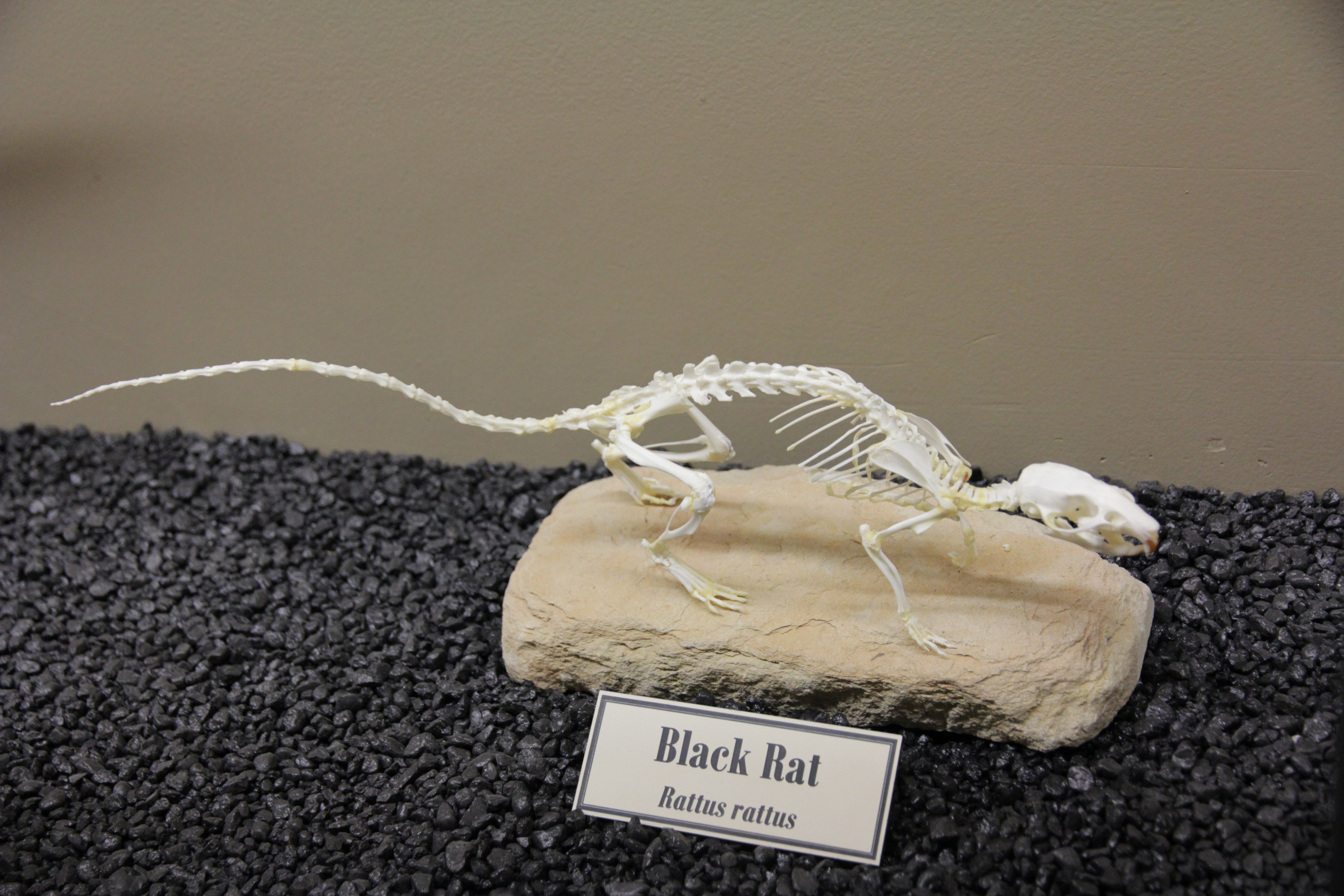
Black rat skeleton at the Museum of Osteology

A typical adult black rat is 12.75 to 18.25 cm (5.02 to 7.19 in) long, not including a 15 to 22 cm (5.9 to 8.7 in) tail, and weighs 75 to 230 g (2.6 to 8.1 oz), depending on the subspecies. Despite its name, the black rat exhibits several colour forms. It is usually black to light brown in colour with a lighter underside. In England during the 1920s, several variations were bred and shown alongside domesticated brown rats. This included an unusual green-tinted variety.

The species has three colour variants:

- Roof rat (R. rattus rattus) – slate black with a gray underside
- Alexandrine rat (R. rattus alexandrinus) – agouti and grey through slate grey
- Fruit rat (R. rattus frugivorus) – agouti and pure white.

Tail length varies among subspecies, but is typically longer than the rat's head and body combined. Both R. rattus alexandrinus and R. rattus frugivorus display a tendency for longer tails than other sub-species. The baculum of R. rattus is similar in structure to that of R. norvegicus, and composed of cartilage at the tip, with the base being built of bone. As with R. norvegicus, the phallus is covered in spines.

=== Skull ===
Among all three variants, skull size and shape is roughly constant.

== Origin ==
The black rat was present in prehistoric Europe and in the Levant during postglacial periods. The black rat in the Mediterranean region differs genetically from its South Asian ancestor by having 38 instead of 42 chromosomes. Its closest relative is the Asian house rat (R. tanezumi) from Southeast Asia. The two diverged about 120,000 years ago in southwestern Asia. It is unclear how the rat made its way to Europe due to insufficient data, although a land route seems more likely based on the distribution of European haplogroup "A". The black rat spread throughout Europe with the Roman conquest, but declined around the 6th century, possibly due to collapse of the Roman grain trade, climate cooling, or the Justinianic Plague. R. rattus specimens have been found dating back to 800 BCE in Britain, although it is unclear how they migrated there. A genetically different rat population of haplogroup A replaced the Roman population in the medieval times in Europe.

It is a resilient vector for many diseases because of its ability to hold so many infectious bacteria in its blood. It was formerly thought to have played a primary role in spreading bacteria contained in fleas on its body, such as the plague bacterium (Yersinia pestis) which is responsible for the Plague of Justinian and the Black Death. However, recent studies have called this theory into question and instead posit humans themselves as the vector, as the movements of the epidemics and the black rat populations do not show historical or geographical correspondence. A study published in 2015 indicates that other Asiatic rodents served as plague reservoirs, from which infections spread as far west as Europe via trade routes, both overland and maritime. Although the black rat was certainly a plague vector in European ports, the spread of the plague beyond areas colonized by rats suggests that the plague was also circulated by humans after reaching Europe.

== Distribution and habitat ==
The black rat originated in India and Southeast Asia, and spread to the Near East and Egypt, and then throughout the Roman Empire, reaching Great Britain as early as the 1st century AD. Europeans subsequently spread it throughout the world. The black rat is again largely confined to warmer areas, having been supplanted by the brown rat (Rattus norvegicus) in cooler regions and urban areas. In addition to the brown rat being larger and more aggressive, the change from wooden structures and thatched roofs to bricked and tiled buildings favoured the burrowing brown rats over the arboreal black rats. In addition, brown rats eat a wider variety of foods, and are more resistant to weather extremes.

Black rat populations can increase exponentially under certain circumstances, perhaps having to do with the timing of the fruiting of the bamboo plant, and cause devastation to the plantings of subsistence farmers; this phenomenon is known as mautam in parts of India.

Black rats are thought to have arrived in Australia with the First Fleet, and subsequently spread to many coastal regions in the country.

Black rats adapt to a wide range of habitats. In urban areas they are found around warehouses, residential buildings, and other human settlements. They are also found in agricultural areas, such as in barns and crop fields. In urban areas, they prefer to live in dry upper levels of buildings, so they are commonly found in wall cavities and false ceilings. In the wild, black rats live in cliffs, rocks, the ground, and trees. They are great climbers and prefer to live in palms and trees, such as pine trees. Their nests are typically spherical and made of shredded material, including sticks, leaves, other vegetation and cloth. In the absence of palms or trees, they can burrow into the ground. Black rats are also found around fences, ponds, riverbanks, streams, and reservoirs.

== Behaviour and ecology ==
The black rat has a wide home range, typically foraging in a home range of 0.28–1.2 ha (0.69–2.97 acres). Its home range is highly dependent on its gender, as male rats range can be up to thrice that of female rats. Its home range also differs depending on the type of forest; home ranges in the southern beech forests of the South Island, New Zealand appear to be much larger than the non-beech forests of the North Island. Due to the limited number of rats that are studied in home range studies, the estimated sizes of rat home ranges in different rat demographic groups are inconclusive.

=== Social behaviour ===
The black rat is generally territorial, although the territory is typically a small subset of the full range. Female black rats have no hierarchy, and are generally more aggressive, while male rats tend to flee when attacked unless females are present. Like its relative R. norvegicus, R. rattus often huddle in groups. Rats are at their most aggressive when they have just reached adulthood, but do not tend to lose status as they grow older, and younger rats are often singled out as enemies by older females. Older females and male rats of high status rarely fight among themselves, although they are occasionally fought by younger rats. Although rattus and norvegicus can coexist in the same habitat, R. rattus will typically attack any norvegicus that enter an established colony.

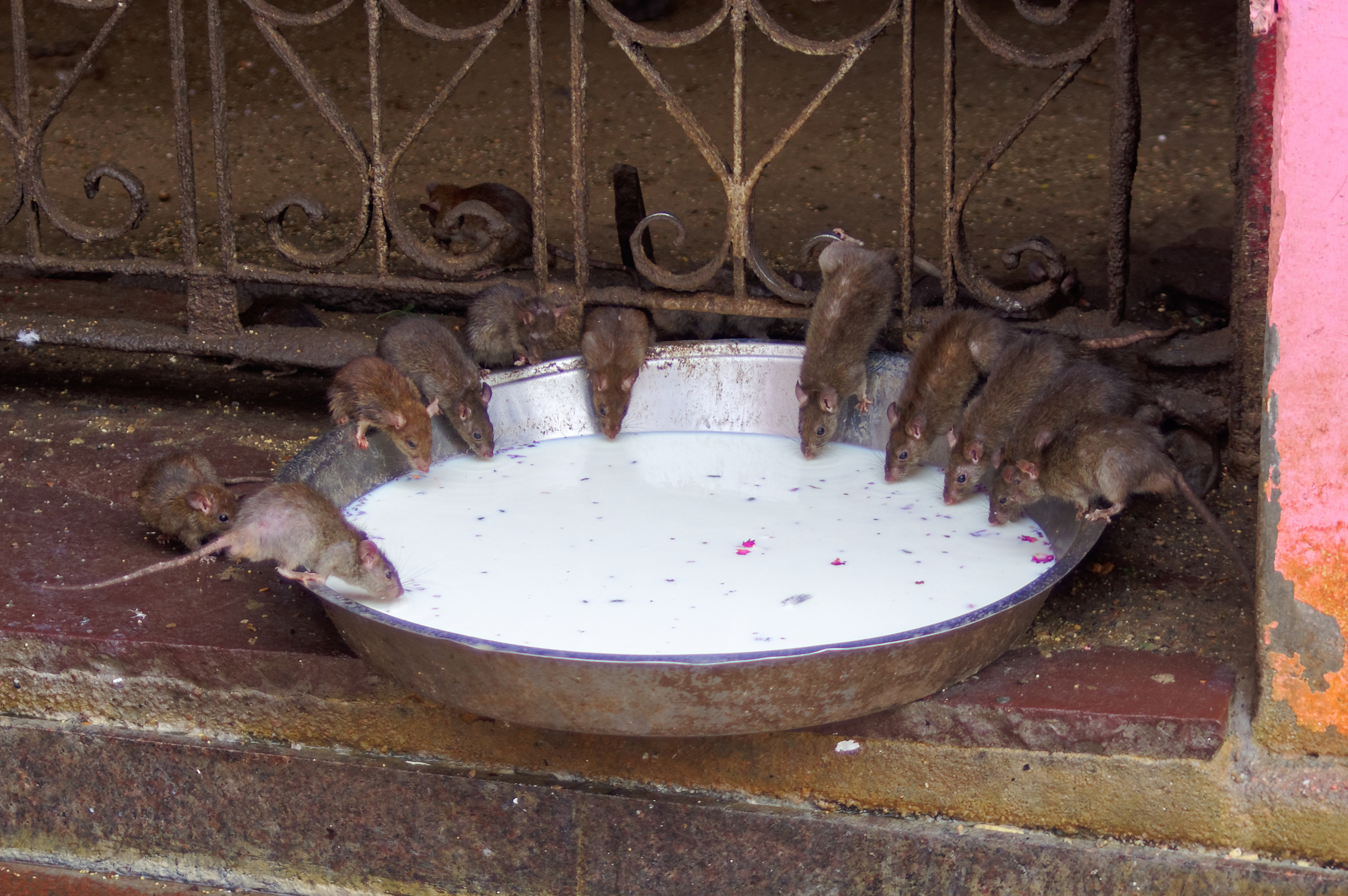
Thousands of black rats live at the Karni Mata Temple, the "Temple of Rats"

Rats may mark their territory by rubbing themselves against trees, and typically prefer to mark areas that are the least secure from other rats. Scents produced in their preputial gland are also used to identify rats to the opposite sex during mating.

=== Mating and reproduction ===
Black rats typically breed year-round, and females can produce up to 5 litters in one season. In populations where most rats are closely related, rats may leave the colony as they reach sexual maturity in order to avoid inbreeding. During copulation, male rats seldom mount females for more than one second, but can continue to mount a female repeatedly for up to ten minutes. Female rats' gestation period can range from 12 to 29 days. Black rats typically live for about one year in the wild and up to four years in captivity.

=== Diet and foraging ===
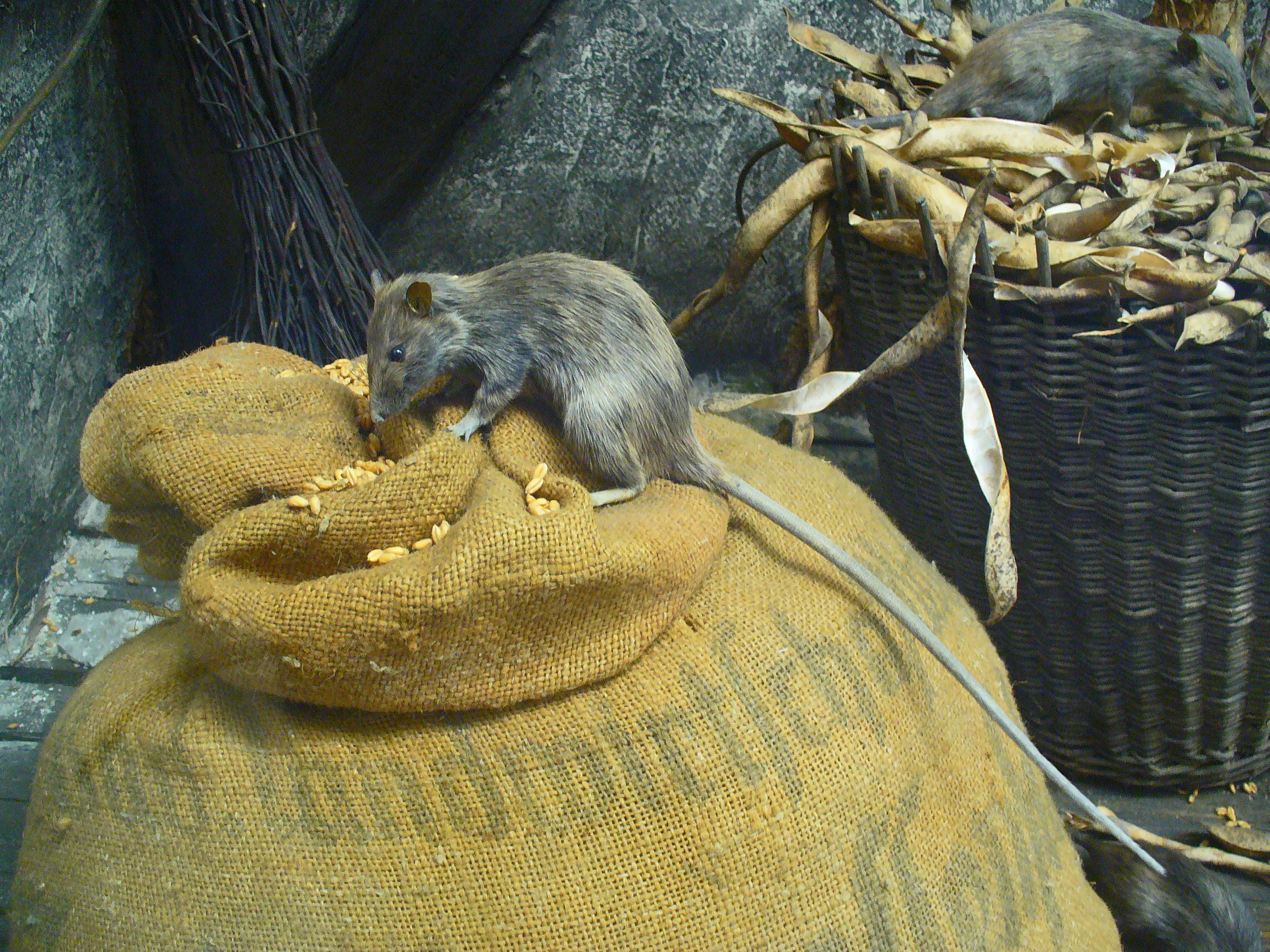
Taxidermy of a black rat eating grain at the State Museum of Natural History Karlsruhe

The black rat is considered to be an omnivore and eats a wide range of foods, including seeds, fruit, stems, leaves, fungi, and a variety of invertebrates and vertebrates. It is a generalist, and thus not very specific in its food preferences, which is indicated by its tendency to feed on any meal provided for cows, swine, chickens, cats and dogs. It eats about 15 g (0.53 oz) per day and drinks about 15 ml (0.53 imp fl oz; 0.51 US fl oz) per day. Its diet is high in water content. It feeds on birds and insects, and also on a variety of agricultural-based crops, such as cereals, sugar cane, coconuts, cocoa, oranges, and coffee beans.

The black rat displays flexibility in its foraging behaviour. It is a predatory species and adapts to different micro-habitats. It often meets and forages together in close proximity within and between sexes. It tends to forage after sunset. If the food cannot be eaten quickly, it searches for a place to carry and hoard to eat at a later time. Although it eats a broad range of foods, it is a highly selective feeder; only a restricted selection of the foods is dominating. When offered a wide diversity of foods, it eats only a small sample of each. This allows it to monitor the quality of foods that are present year round, such as leaves, as well as seasonal foods, such as herbs and insects. This method of operating on a set of foraging standards ultimately determines the final composition of its meals. Also, by sampling the available food in an area, it maintains a dynamic food supply, balances its nutrient intake, and avoids intoxication by secondary compounds.

=== Nesting behaviour ===
Through the usage of tracking devices such as radio transmitters, rats have been found to occupy dens located in trees, as well as on the ground. In Puketi Forest in the Northland Region of New Zealand, rats have been found to form dens together. Rats appear to den and forage in separate areas in their home range depending on the availability of food resources. Research shows that, in New South Wales, the black rat prefers to inhabit lower leaf litter of forest habitat. There is also an apparent correlation between the canopy height and logs and the presence of black rats. This correlation may be a result of the distribution of the abundance of prey as well as available refuges for rats to avoid predators. As found in North Head, New South Wales, there is positive correlation between rat abundance, leaf litter cover, canopy height, and litter depth. All other habitat variables showed little to no correlation. Unlike brown rats, black rats have a tendency to nest inside trees or the upper floors of a house,.

=== Diseases ===
Black rats (or their ectoparasites) can carry a number of pathogens, of which bubonic plague (via the Oriental rat flea), typhus, Weil's disease, toxoplasmosis and trichinosis are the best known. It has been hypothesized that the displacement of black rats by brown rats led to the decline of the Black Death. This theory has, however, been deprecated, as the dates of these displacements do not match the increases and decreases in plague outbreaks.

==== Plague ====
Black rats are the main transmitter of bubonic plague, or Yersinia pestis, which they spread indirectly through the fleas they carry. Although other animals such as coyotes, bobcats, and rabbits can serve as plague reservoirs, the flea species Xenopsylla cheopis commonly carried by R. rattus is one of the most effective spreaders. However, archaeological evidence indicates that R. rattus might not have been present during the Black Death in England, suggesting that the plague was spread by another species. Although R. rattus populations often die out after a plague, causing transmission to cease, rats that survive the plague can serve as reservoirs for the disease, as well as transmitting it from wild reservoir populations to human settlements. Rats in regions where plague is present may also develop immunity, allowing rats and their associated fleas to survive longer than in other regions. Black rats' transmission of the Black Death in Europe was likely halted by a change in the Yersinia pestis bacterium that produced a milder version, inoculating rat populations against the plague.

Rats serve as outstanding vectors for transmittance of diseases because they can carry bacteria and viruses in their systems. A number of bacterial diseases are common to rats, and these include Streptococcus pneumoniae, Corynebacterium kutsheri, Bacillus piliformis, Pasteurella pneumotropica, and Streptobacillus moniliformis, to name a few. As well as carrying zoonotic infections, R. rattus is also capable of transmitting diseases to native rat species, causing their decline when rattus is introduced. In some cases, these diseases are incurable. In addition to transmitting bacterial infections, black rats can also cary parasites such as Calodium, and protozoas including Toxoplasma gondii, many of which can be transmitted to humans.

=== Predators ===
The black rat is prey to cats and owls in domestic settings. In less urban settings, rats are preyed on by weasels, foxes and coyotes. These predators have little effect on the control of the black rat population because black rats are agile and fast climbers. In addition to agility, the black rat also uses its keen sense of hearing to detect danger and quickly evade mammalian and avian predators.

== As an invasive species ==
=== Damage caused ===
After Rattus rattus was introduced into the northern islands of New Zealand, they fed on the seedlings, adversely affecting the ecology of the islands. R. rattus is known to destroy the nests of native birds, causing up to 96% of total nest predations. When consuming these seabirds and seabird eggs, these rats reduce the pH of the soil. This harms plant species by reducing nutrient availability in soil, thus decreasing the probability of seed germination. For example, research conducted by Hoffman et al. indicates a large impact on 16 indigenous plant species directly preyed on by R. rattus. These plants displayed a negative correlation in germination and growth in the presence of black rats. Rats prefer to forage in forest habitats. In the Ogasawara islands, they prey on the indigenous snails and seedlings. Snails that inhabit the leaf litter of these islands showed a significant decline in population on the introduction of Rattus rattus. The black rat shows a preference for snails with larger shells (greater than 10 mm), and this led to a great decline in the population of snails with larger shells. A lack of prey refuges makes it more difficult for the snail to avoid the rat.

=== Complex pest ===
The black rat is a complex pest, defined as one that influences the environment in both harmful and beneficial ways. In many cases, after the black rat is introduced into a new area, the population size of some native species declines or goes extinct. This is because the black rat is a good generalist with a wide dietary niche and a preference for complex habitats; this causes strong competition for resources among small animals. This has led to the black rat completely displacing many native species in Madagascar, the Galapagos, and the Florida Keys. In a study by Stokes et al., habitats suitable for the native bush rat, Rattus fuscipes, of Australia are often invaded by the black rat and are eventually occupied by only the black rat. When the abundances of these two rat species were compared in different micro-habitats, both were found to be affected by micro-habitat disturbances, but the black rat was most abundant in areas of high disturbance; this indicates it has a better dispersal ability.

Despite the black rat's tendency to displace native species, it can also aid in increasing species population numbers and maintaining species diversity. The bush rat, a common vector for spore dispersal of truffles, has been extirpated from many micro-habitats of Australia. In the absence of a vector, the diversity of truffle species would be expected to decline. In a study in New South Wales, Australia it was found that, although the bush rat consumes a diversity of truffle species, the black rat consumes as much of the diverse fungi as the natives and is an effective vector for spore dispersal. Since the black rat now occupies many of the micro-habitats that were previously inhabited by the bush rat, the black rat plays an important ecological role in the dispersal of fungal spores. By eradicating the black rat populations in Australia, the diversity of fungi would decline, potentially doing more harm than good.

=== Control methods ===
Large-scale rat control programs have been taken to maintain a steady level of the invasive predators in order to conserve the native species in New Zealand such as kōkako and mohua. Pesticides, such as pindone and 1080 (sodium fluoroacetate), are commonly distributed via aerial spray by helicopter as a method of mass control on islands infested with invasive rat populations. Bait, such as brodifacoum, is also used along with coloured dyes (used to deter birds from eating the baits) in order to kill and identify rats for experimental and tracking purposes. Another method to track rats is the use of wired cage traps, which are used along with bait, such as rolled oats and peanut butter, to tag and track rats to determine population sizes through methods like mark-recapture and radio-tracking. Tracking tunnels (coreflute tunnels containing an inked card) are also commonly used monitoring devices, as are chew-cards containing peanut butter. Poison control methods are effective in reducing rat populations to nonthreatening sizes, but rat populations often rebound to normal size within months. Besides their highly adaptive foraging behaviour and fast reproduction, the exact mechanisms for their rebound is unclear and are still being studied.

In 2010, the Sociedad Ornitológica Puertorriqueña (Puerto Rican Bird Society) and the Ponce Yacht and Fishing Club launched a campaign to eradicate the black rat from the Isla Ratones (Mice Island) and Isla Cardona (Cardona Island) islands off the municipality of Ponce, Puerto Rico.

=== Specific areas ===
==== New Zealand ====
The first species of rat introduced to New Zealand from Europe was Rattus norvegicus, or the brown rat, as R. norvegicus was then the dominant rat in England. However, r. rattus became more common on ships in the mid-1800s, and black rats spread throughout the North Island from probably the early 1860s and the South Island from probably the late 1880s. Brown rats were soon replaced as the dominant species by black rats, possibly due to their more optimal foraging habits. Due to their common behaviour of stealing eggs from bird nests, ship rats have caused a number of native bird species in New Zealand to become extinct, most recently the bush wren. Since the 1980s, many successful rat eradications have been performed across New Zealand's islands of R. rattus, R. norvegicus, and R. exulans (Polynesian rat), sometimes jointly, on islands such as Awaiti and Tawhitinui. However, black rats continue to have a major presence on mainland New Zealand, and are at one of the highest risks for reinfestation out of all species of invasive rodents.

=== Decline in population ===
Eradication projects have eliminated black rats from Lundy in the Bristol Channel (2006) and from the Shiant Islands in the Outer Hebrides (2016). Populations probably survive on other islands (e.g. Inchcolm) and in localised areas of the British mainland. Recent National Biodiversity Network data indicates very sparse populations around the U.K., and The Mammal Society has no records in the major port towns of Manchester, Liverpool or Glasgow for over 40 years, areas which were historically population strongholds.

== See also ==
- Karni Mata Temple, Deshnoke, Rajasthan, India.
- Urban plague
