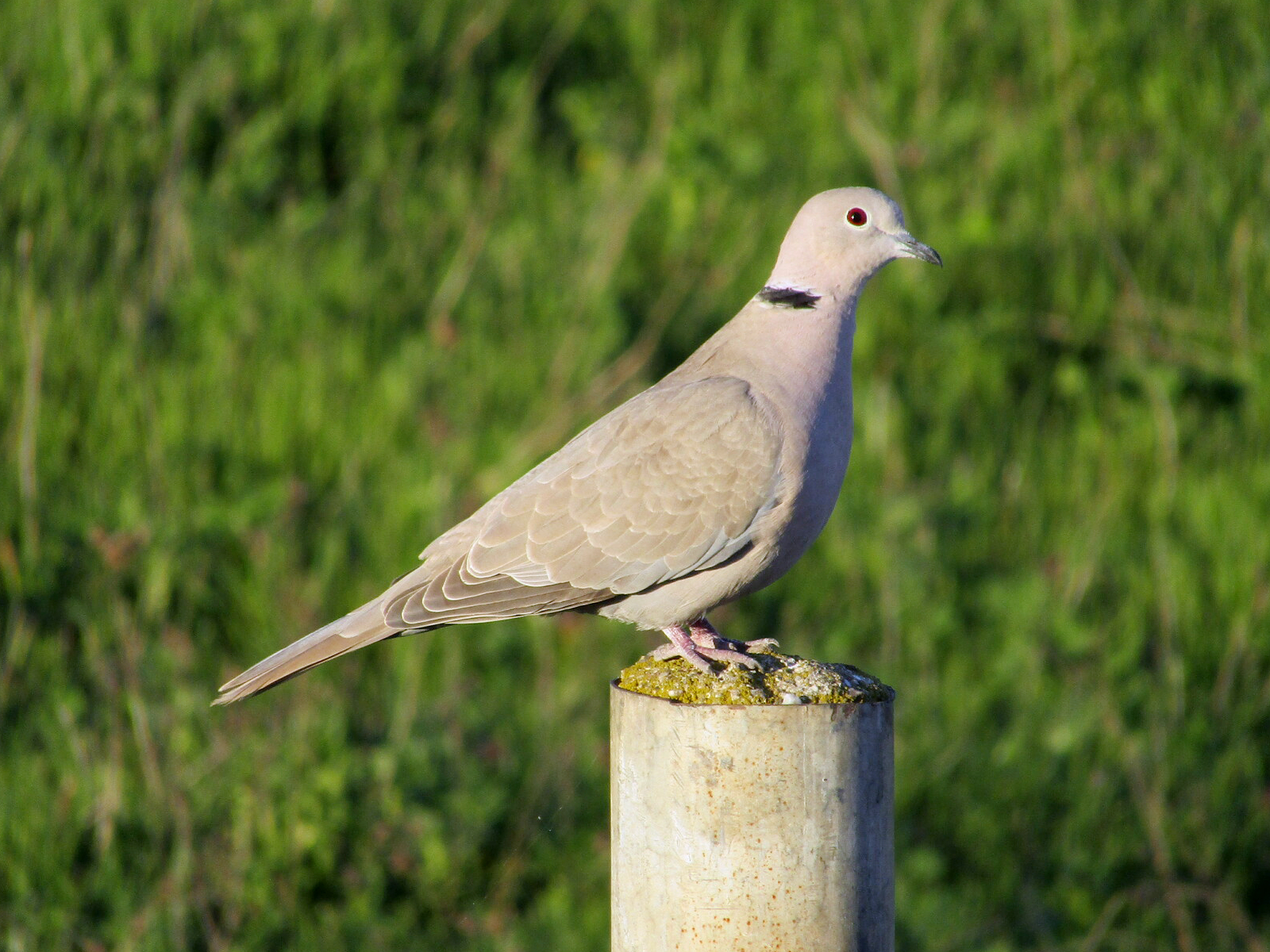
- A Eurasian collared dove near Plovdiv in Bulgaria, close to where the species was first described

Conservation status
- Least Concern (IUCN 3.1)

Scientific classification
- Kingdom: Animalia
- Phylum: Chordata
- Class: Aves
- Order: Columbiformes
- Family: Columbidae
- Genus: Streptopelia
- Species: S. decaocto

Binomial name
- Streptopelia decaocto (Frivaldszky, 1838)
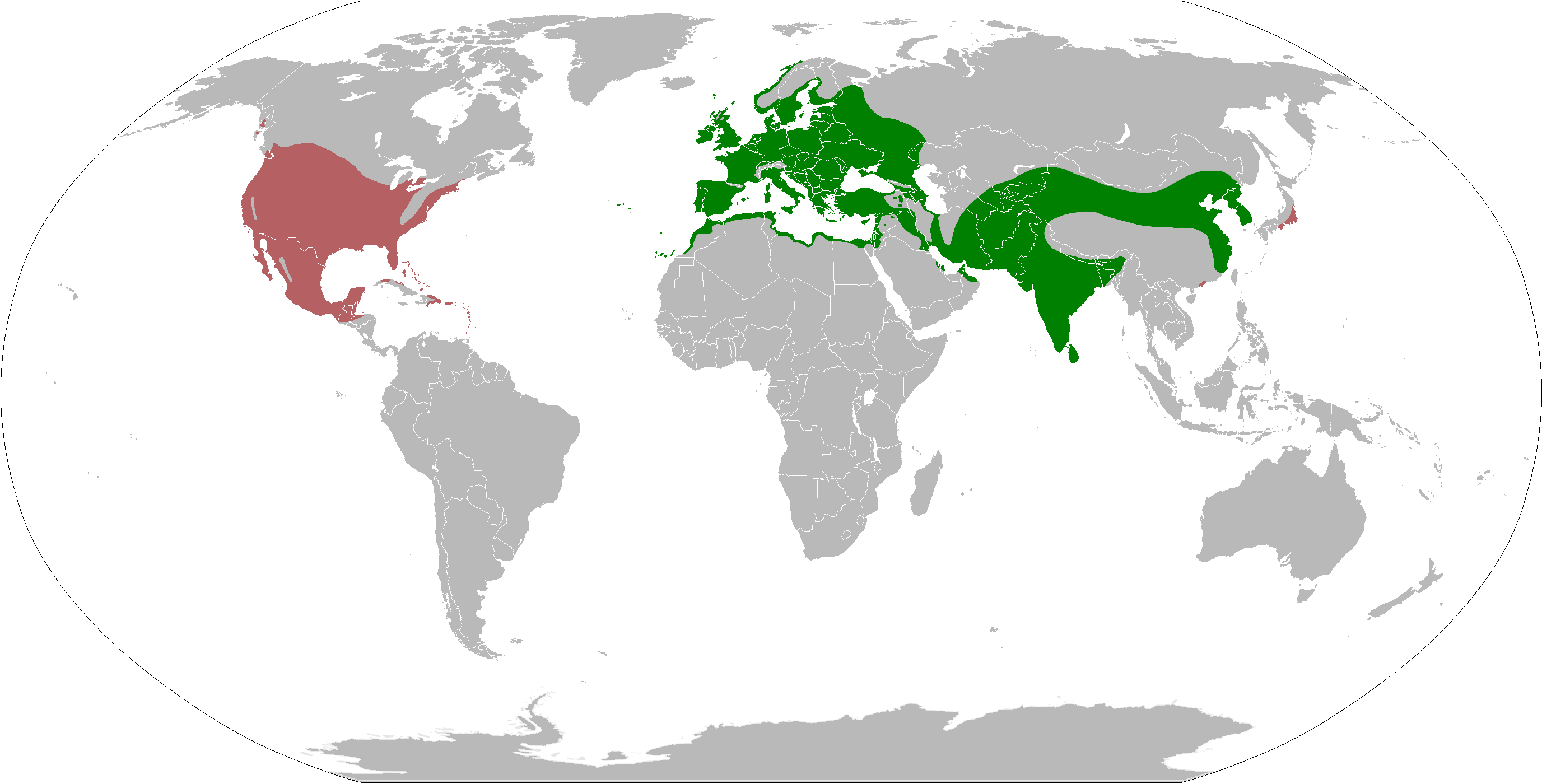

Audio
- Song

= Eurasian collared dove =

Species of bird

The Eurasian collared dove (Streptopelia decaocto), often called the collared dove, is a dove species from the genus Streptopelia. It is grey-buff to pinkish-grey, and has a black half-collar edged with white on its nape, alluding to the name. It is native to Europe, Asia, and North Africa. It has also been introduced to Japan, North and Central America, and select Caribbean islands.

== Taxonomy ==
The Hungarian naturalist Imre Frivaldszky first described the Eurasian collared dove with the scientific name Columba risoria varietas C. decaocto in 1838, considering it a wild variety of the domesticated barbary dove. The type locality is Plovdiv in Bulgaria. It is now placed in the genus Streptopelia that was described in 1855 by the French ornithologist Charles Lucien Bonaparte.

The Burmese collared dove (S. xanthocycla) was formerly considered a subspecies of the Eurasian collared dove, but was split as a distinct species by the IOC in 2021. Two other subspecies were formerly sometimes accepted, S. d. stoliczkae from Turkestan in central Asia and S. d. intercedens from southern India and Sri Lanka; they are now considered junior synonyms of the species.

The Eurasian collared dove is also closely related to the Sunda collared dove of southeast Asia and the African collared dove of Sub-Saharan Africa, forming a superspecies with these. Identification from the African collared dove is difficult with silent birds, with the African species being marginally smaller and paler, but the calls are distinct, a soft purring "Cou'crrrrroouw" in the African collared dove unlike the Eurasian collared dove's three-note cooing.

=== Etymology ===
The generic name is from the Ancient Greek streptos meaning "collar" and peleia meaning "dove". The specific epithet, decaocto, is Greek for "eighteen", a traditional onomatopoeia for the bird's call. The association of the dove with the number eighteen has its roots in a Greek myth. A maid who worked hard for little money was unhappy that she was only paid 18 silver coins a year and begged the gods to let the world know how little she was rewarded by her mistress. Zeus, hearing her pleas, created the collared dove (or transformed the maid into the dove), and it has called out "decaocto" ever since to tell the world of her mistreatment. In several Balkan languages, the number 18 is a three-syllable word (e.g. tiz-en-nyolc in Frivaldszky's native Hungarian), so is likewise onomatopoeic for the bird's call.

As most of its European range in the 19th century, including its type locality, was within the Turkish-controlled Ottoman Empire, its name in many European languages translates as Turkish dove, e.g. Danish Tyrkerdue, German Türkentaube, French Tourterelle turque.

== Description ==
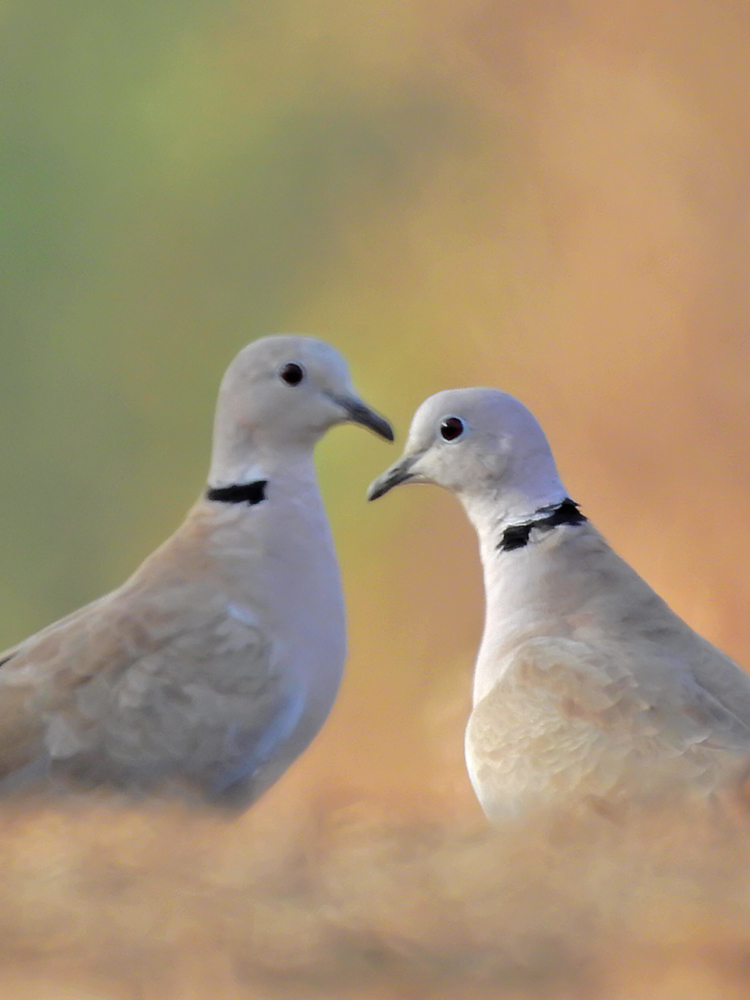
A pair in Mangaon, Maharashtra, India

It is a medium-sized dove, with an average length of 32 cm (13 in) from tip of beak to tip of tail, a wingspan of 47–55 cm (19–22 in) and a weight of 125–240 g (4.4–8.5 oz). It is grey-buff to pinkish-grey, slightly darker above than below, and with a blue-grey underwing patch. The tail feathers are grey-buff above, and dark grey and tipped white below; the outer tail feathers are also tipped whitish above. It has a black half-collar edged with white on its nape.

The short legs are red, and the bill is black. The iris is red, but from a distance the eyes appear to be black, as the pupil is relatively large; a narrow rim of reddish-brown iris surrounds the black pupil. The eye is surrounded by a small area of bare skin, either white or yellow. The two sexes are identical; juveniles only differ in having a poorly developed collar, and a brown iris.

The Eurasian collared dove's call is a three-syllable goo-GOO-goo, with stress placed on the second syllable. It also makes a harsh loud screeching call chrrai-chrrai lasting about two seconds, particularly in flight just before landing.

Eurasian collared doves cooing in early spring are sometimes mistakenly reported as the calls of early-arriving common cuckoos.

Although the average lifespan is 3 years in the wild, the oldest age for an individual ever documented was over 13 years, 8 months old.

== Distribution and habitat ==
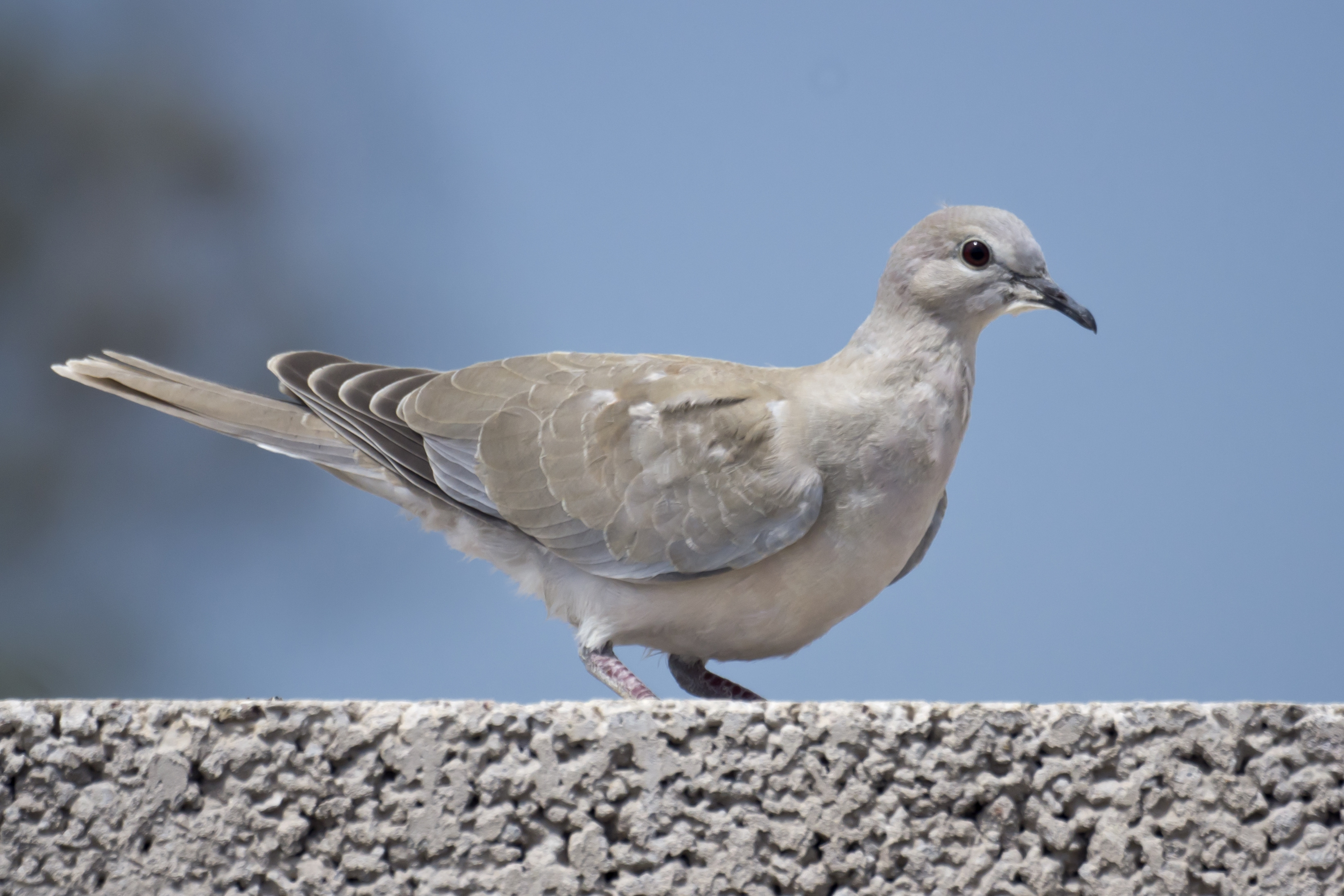
Juvenile before collar formation

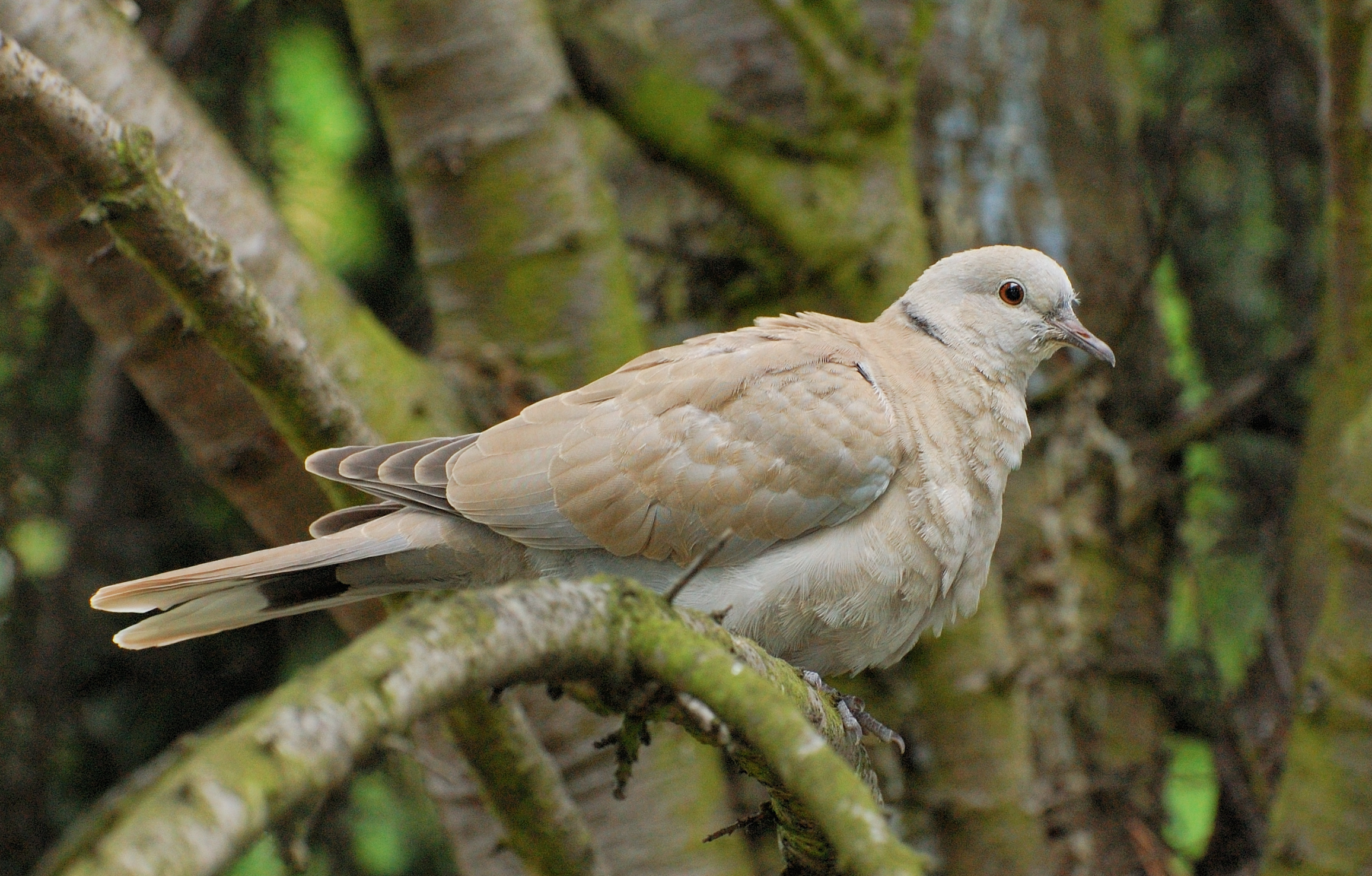
Juvenile with early collar development

The Eurasian collared dove is resident in Europe from Scandinavia and central Europe and eastwards to the Levant, the Arabian Peninsula and Central Asia. It is strongly dispersive. Over the last century, it has travelled far beyond its native range to colonise colder countries, becoming a permanent resident in several of them. Its original range at the end of the 19th century was Asia, from eastern Turkey to southern China, and south through India to Sri Lanka.

In 1838, it was reported in Bulgaria, but not until the 20th century did it expand across Europe, appearing in parts of the Balkans between 1900 and 1920, and then spreading rapidly northwest, reaching Germany in 1945, Denmark in 1948, Great Britain on 14 May 1952 (breeding for the first time in 1956), Ireland in 1959, and the Faroe Islands in the early 1970s.

Subsequent spread was 'sideways' from this fast northwestern spread, reaching northeast to north of the Arctic Circle in Norway and east to the Ural Mountains in Russia, and southwest to the Canary Islands and northern Africa from Morocco to Egypt, by the end of the 20th century. In the east of its range, it has also spread northeast to most of central and northern China, and locally (probably introduced) in Japan. It has also reached Iceland as a vagrant bird, but has not colonised there; 41 records were known as of 2006.

Despite this spread, a population decline occurred in Britain from 2005, possibly caused by finch trichomonosis. By 2026, numbers had dropped by 40%.

=== Invasive status in North America ===
In 1974, fewer than 50 Eurasian collared doves escaped captivity in Nassau, New Providence, Bahamas. From the Bahamas, the species spread to Florida, and now occurs in nearly every state in the U.S., and in Mexico.

The Eurasian collared dove spread across North America after its introduction to the United States; by 1989, it was recorded in southeastern Arkansas, and by 1997, in northwestern Arkansas. It had migrated across the state over the span of five years, covering a distance of about 500 km (310 mi) at a rate of 100 km (62 mi) per year. This is more than double the rate of 45 km (28 mi) per year observed in Europe.

As of 2012, few negative impacts of the Eurasian collared dove have been demonstrated in Florida, where the species is most prolific. It is often considered as an aggressive competitor to native birds and there is concern that as populations continue to grow, it could out-compete native species. However, Eurasian collared doves are not more aggressive or competitive than native mourning doves, despite similar diets.

Population growth has ceased in areas where the species has long been established, such as Florida, and in these regions, recent observations suggest the population is in decline. The population is still growing exponentially in areas of more recent introduction; up to 2015, the Eurasian collared dove experienced a greater than 1.5% yearly population increase throughout nearly the entirety of its North American range. Carrying capacity appears to be highest in areas with higher temperatures and intermediate levels of development, such as suburban areas and some agricultural areas.

While the spread of disease to native species has not been recorded, Eurasian collared doves are known carriers of the parasite Trichomonas gallinae and pigeon paramyxovirus type 1. Both Trichomonas gallinae and pigeon paramyxovirus type 1 can spread to native birds via commingling at feeders and when the doves are consumed by predators. Pigeon paramyxovirus type 1 is an emergent disease that has the potential to affect domestic poultry, making the Eurasian collared dove a possible economic threat.

== Behaviour and ecology ==
=== Breeding ===
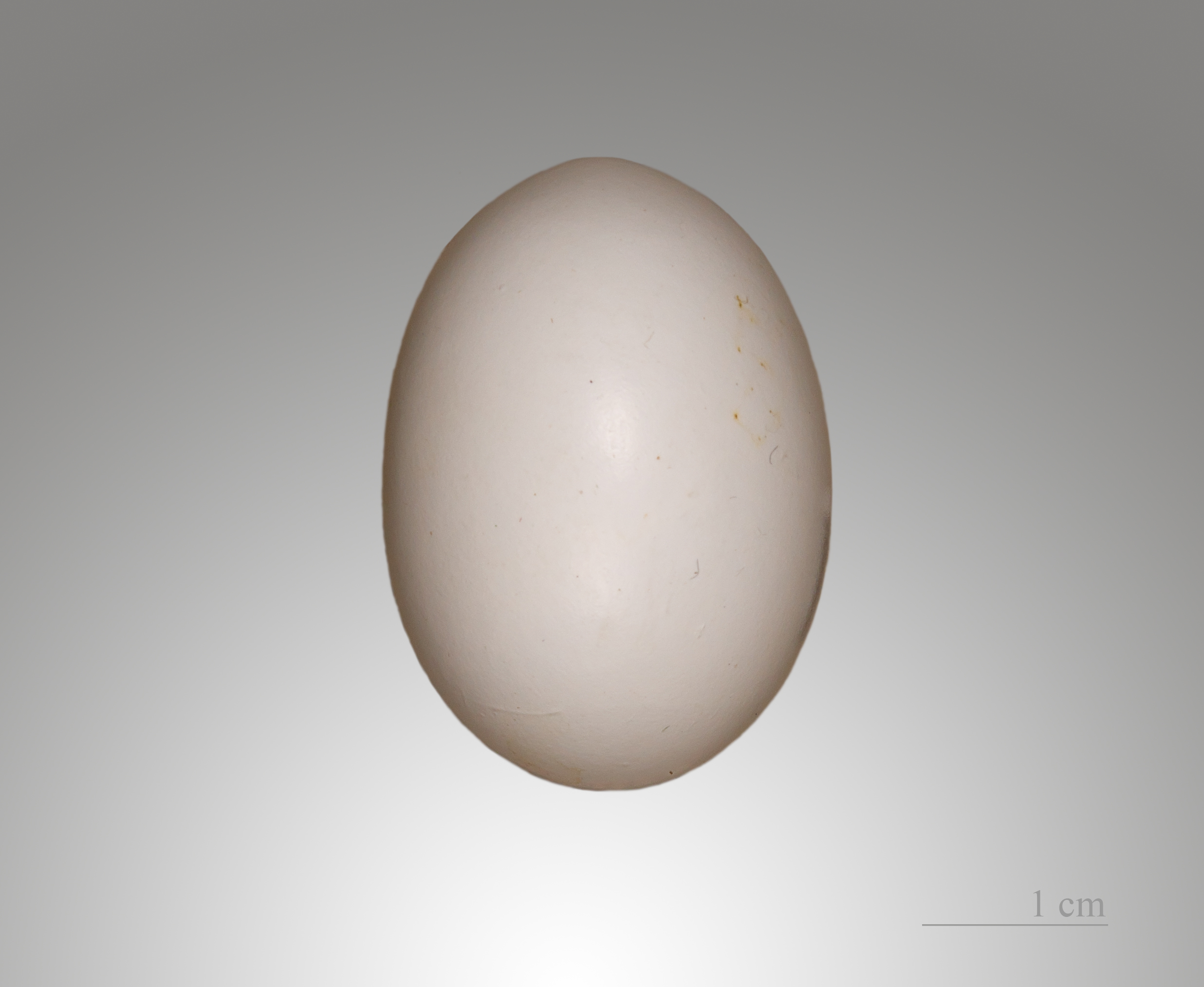
Egg

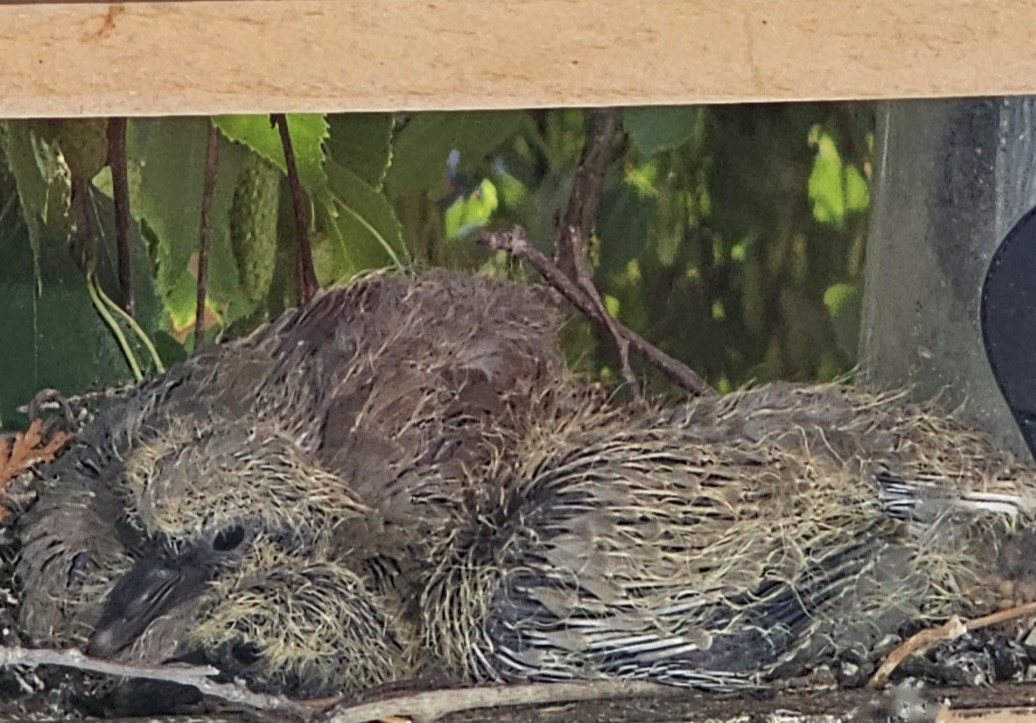
Two Eurasian collared dove chicks

Eurasian collared doves typically breed close to human habitation wherever food resources are abundant and trees are available for nesting; almost all nests are within 1 km (0.62 mi) of inhabited buildings. The female lays two white eggs in a stick nest, which she incubates during the night and the male incubates during the day. Incubation lasts between 14 and 18 days, with the young fledging after 15 to 19 days. Breeding occurs throughout the year when abundant food is available, though rarely in winter in areas with cold winters such as northeastern Europe. Three to four broods per year are common, although up to six broods in a year have been recorded. Eurasian collared doves are a monogamous species, and share parental duties when caring for young.

The male's mating display is a ritual flight, consisting of a rapid, near-vertical climb to height followed by a long glide downward in a circle, with the wings held below the body in an inverted "V" shape. At all other times, flight is typically direct using fast and clipped wing beats and without use of gliding.

=== Food and feeding ===
The Eurasian collared dove often feeds close to human habitation, including at bird feeders; the largest populations typically occur around farms where spilt grain is frequent around grain stores or where livestock is fed. It is a gregarious species, and winter flocks form around food supplies such as grain, seeds, shoots, and insects. Flocks most commonly number between 10 and 50 individuals, but flocks of up to 10,000 individuals have also been sighted.

The Eurasian collared dove can drink with its head down, as opposed to scooping up water and tipping its head back. It feeds its chicks a substance derived from its own esophagus called "crop milk", and they receive regurgitated seeds after a maximum of 10 days.
