= Sylvatic cycle =

Pathogen transmission cycle portion

The sylvatic cycle, also enzootic or sylvatic transmission cycle, is a portion of the natural transmission cycle of a pathogen. Sylvatic refers to the occurrence of a subject in or affecting wild animals. The sylvatic cycle is the fraction of the pathogen population's lifespan spent cycling between wild animals and vectors. Humans are usually an incidental or dead-end host, infected by a vector. This is opposed to a "domestic" or "urban" cycle, in which the pathogen cycles between vectors and non-wild, urban, or domestic animals; humans may have differing infection rates from these cycles due to transmission efficiencies and environmental exposure levels.

Examples of pathogens that contain a sylvatic cycle include trichinosis, dengue viruses, Yersinia pestis, Chagas disease, and rabies.

== See also ==
- Sylvatic plague
