= Paraavulavirus =

Virus classification
- (unranked): Virus
- Realm: Riboviria
- Kingdom: Orthornavirae
- Phylum: Negarnaviricota
- Class: Monjiviricetes
- Order: Mononegavirales
- Family: Paramyxoviridae
- Subfamily: Avulavirinae
- Genus: Paraavulavirus

Genus of viruses

Paraavulavirus is a genus of viruses in the family Paramyxoviridae.

== Species ==
The genus contains the following species:

- Paraavulavirus hongkongense
- Paraavulavirus neophemae
- Paraavulavirus wisconsinense
