= Epizootic =

Animal disease event, analogous to an epidemic

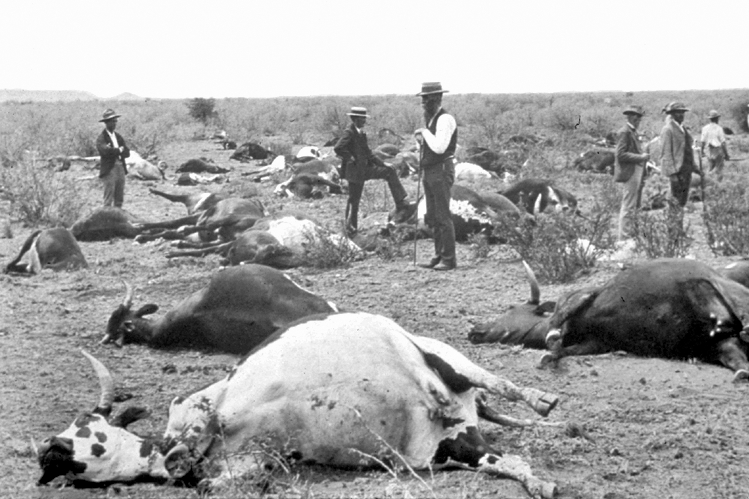
Rinderpest outbreak in South Africa, 1896

In epizoology, an epizootic (or epizoötic, from Greek: epi- 'upon' + zoon 'animal') is a disease event in a nonhuman animal population analogous to an epidemic in humans. An epizootic disease (or epizooty) may occur in a specific locale (an "outbreak"), more generally (an "epizootic"), or become widespread ("panzootic"). High population density is a major contributing factor to epizootics. The aquaculture industry is sometimes plagued by disease because of the large number of fish confined to a small area.

Defining and declaring an epizootic can be subjective; health authorities evaluate the number of new cases in a given animal population during a given period, and estimate a rate of spread that substantially exceeds what they might expect based on recent experience (i.e. a sharp elevation in the incidence rate). Because the judgement is based on what is "expected" or thought normal, a few cases of a very rare disease (like a transmissible spongiform encephalopathy outbreak in a cervid population) might be classified as an "epizootic", while many cases of a common disease (like lymphocystis in esocids) would not.

Common diseases that occur at a constant but relatively high rate in the population class as "enzootic" (compare the epidemiological meaning of "endemic" for human diseases). An example of an enzootic disease would be the influenza virus in some bird populations or, at a lower incidence, the Type IVb strain of viral hemorrhagic septicemia in certain Atlantic fish populations.

An example of an epizootic was the 1990 outbreak of Newcastle disease virus in double-crested cormorant colonies on the Great Lakes that resulted in the death of some 10,000 birds.

== See also ==
- Epidemic
- Enzootic
- Epizoology
- Panzootic
- Equine influenza for the Great Epizootic of 1872 in the US and Canada
- 1890s African rinderpest epizootic
- Mathematical modelling in epidemiology
- Sylvatic plague
- Wildlife disease
