= Urban plague =

Infectious disease affecting rodents

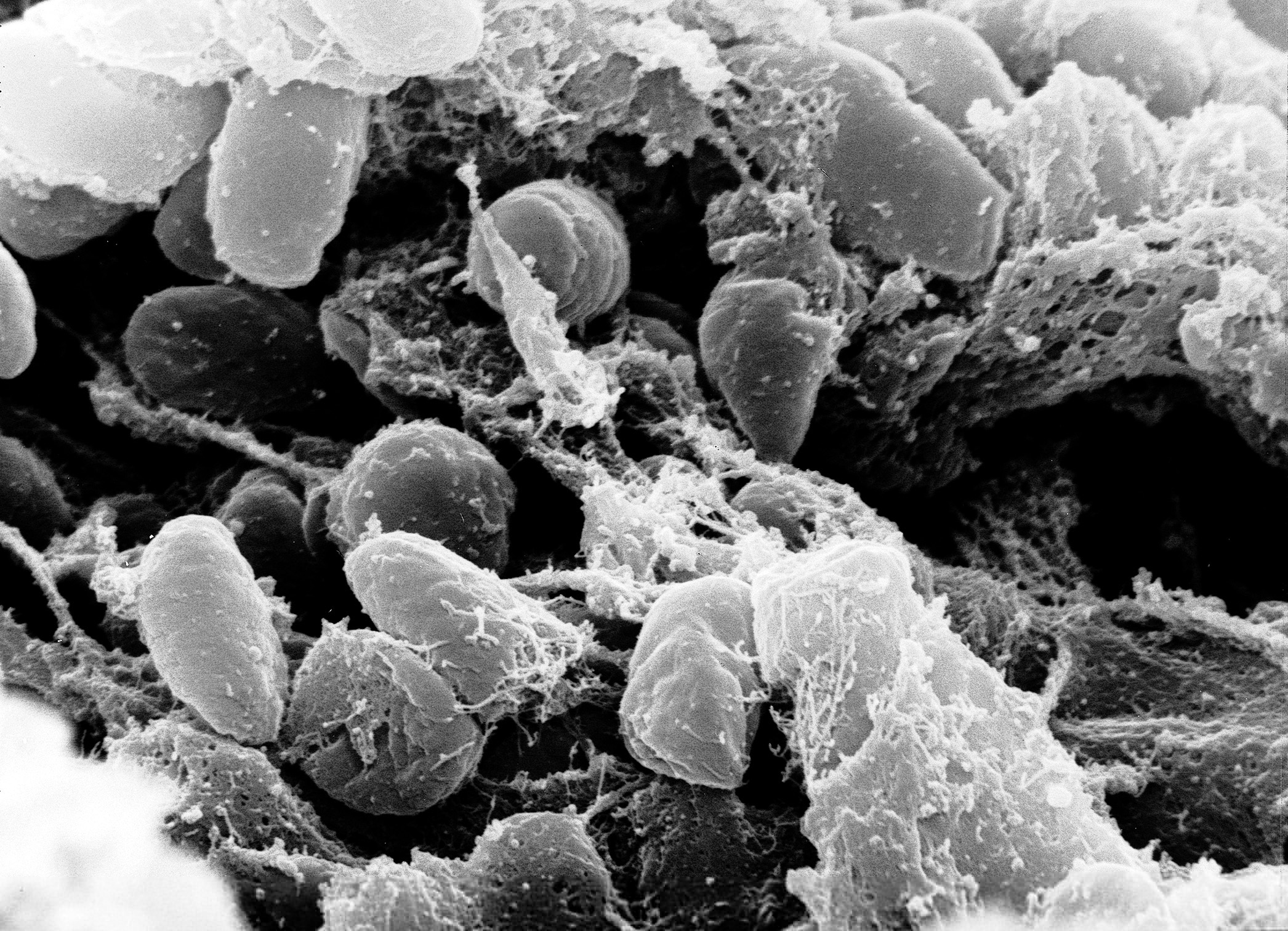
Yersinia pestis

Urban plague is an infectious disease among rodent species that live in close association with humans in urban areas. It is caused by the bacterium Yersinia pestis which is the same bacterium that causes bubonic and pneumonic plague in humans. Plague was first introduced into the United States in 1900 by rat–infested steamships that had sailed from affected areas, mostly from Asia. Urban plague spread from urban rats to rural rodent species, especially among prairie dogs in the western United States.

== Vector reservoir ==
Common vectors for urban plague are house mice, black rats, and Norway rats.

== Transmission ==
Urban plague can be spread from animals to humans via flea bites and handling of infected fluids and tissues. Human to human infection occurs from droplets that contain plague bacteria which are produced when an infected person coughs.

== See also ==
- Sylvatic plague
- Epizootic

== Urban Rodent-Borne Diseases and Public Health ==
Urban rodent-borne diseases are infectious diseases transmitted from rodents to humans in urban environments. These diseases represent a significant public health concern, particularly in densely populated cities where human–animal interactions are more frequent.

Rodents such as rats and mice serve as reservoirs for various pathogens, contributing to the spread of zoonotic diseases through direct contact, contamination of food and water, and environmental exposure.

Leptospirosis is one of the most widespread rodent-borne diseases and is estimated to cause over 1 million cases and approximately 60,000 deaths annually worldwide.

From a One Health perspective, these diseases highlight the interconnected roles of human, animal, and environmental health. Poor sanitation, urban overcrowding, and climate-related factors such as flooding contribute to increased rodent populations and disease transmission.

Prevention strategies include improving waste management, implementing rodent control programs, enhancing urban infrastructure, and promoting public health education."
