= Metaavulavirus =

Virus classification
- (unranked): Virus
- Realm: Riboviria
- Kingdom: Orthornavirae
- Phylum: Negarnaviricota
- Class: Monjiviricetes
- Order: Mononegavirales
- Family: Paramyxoviridae
- Subfamily: Avulavirinae
- Genus: Metaavulavirus

Genus of viruses

Metaavulavirus is a genus of viruses in the family Paramyxoviridae.

== Species ==
The genus contains the following species:

- Metaavulavirus bangorense
- Metaavulavirus calidris
- Metaavulavirus delawarense
- Metaavulavirus falklandense
- Metaavulavirus galliense
- Metaavulavirus hongkongense
- Metaavulavirus japanense
- Metaavulavirus kazakhstanense
- Metaavulavirus kunitachiense
- Metaavulavirus peixense
- Metaavulavirus procarduelis
- Metaavulavirus taiwanense
- Metaavulavirus tennessense
- Metaavulavirus yucaipaense
