= Microbiota (disambiguation) =

Microbiota are the microflora and microfauna in an ecosystem.

Microbiota may also refer to:

- Microbiota (plant), a genus of coniferous plants in the family Cupressaceae

== See also ==
- Gut microbiota
- Human microbiota
- Lung microbiota
- Skin microbiota
- Vaginal microbiota
