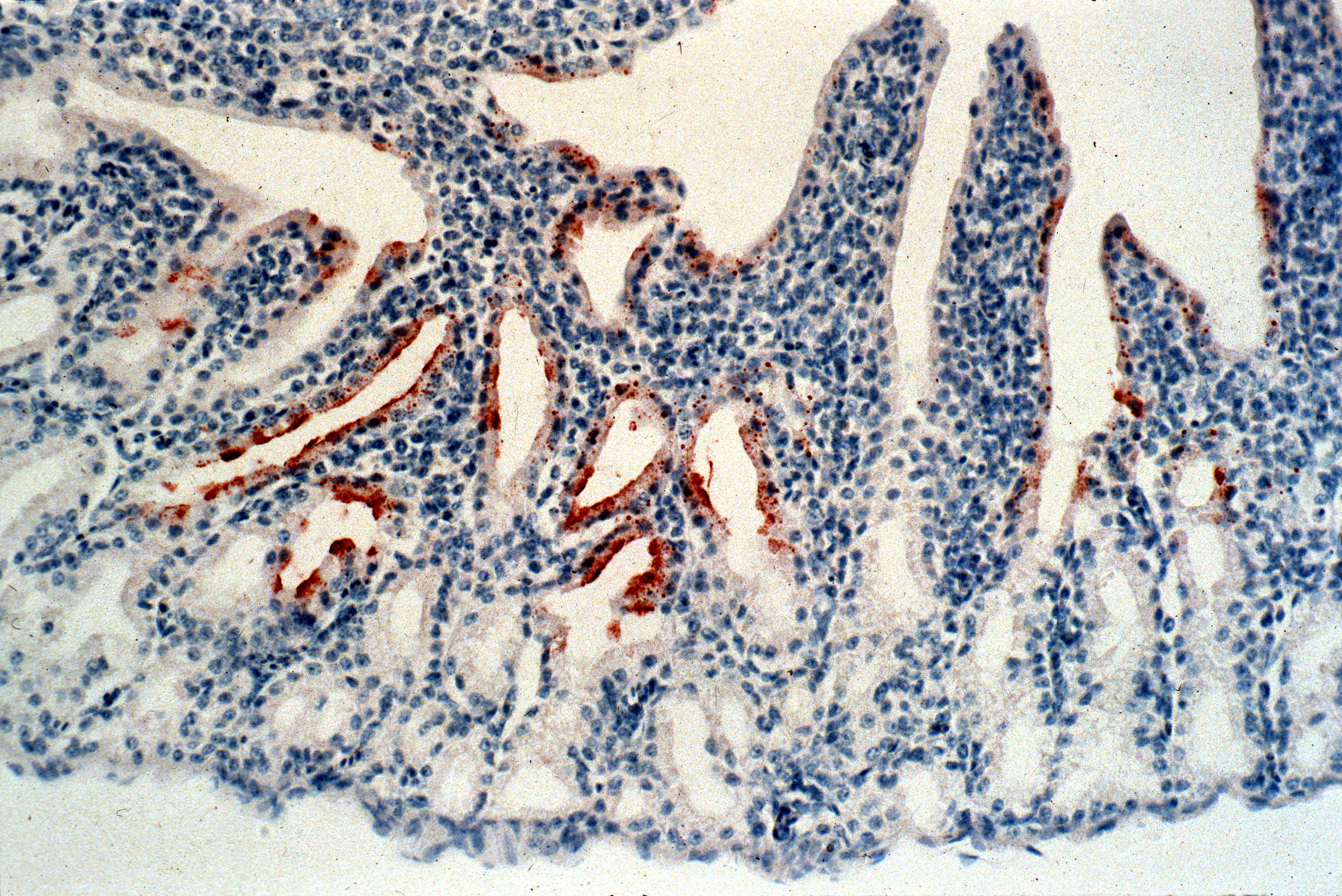
- Newcastle disease virus (stained in brown) in the conjunctiva of a chicken

Virus classification
- (unranked): Virus
- Realm: Riboviria
- Kingdom: Orthornavirae
- Phylum: Negarnaviricota
- Class: Monjiviricetes
- Order: Mononegavirales
- Family: Paramyxoviridae
- Subfamily: Avulavirinae

Genera
- Metaavulavirus; Orthoavulavirus; Paraavulavirus

= Avulavirinae =

Subfamily of viruses

Avulavirinae is a subfamily of viruses in the family Paramyxoviridae. Members of the subfamily are collectively known as avulaviruses. All members of the subfamily primarily infect birds. Avulavirinae was previously recognized as the genus Avulavirus before being elevated to a subfamily. The term avula comes from "avian rubula", distinguishing it from rubulaviruses of the subfamily Rubulavirinae due to avulaviruses only infecting birds and translating protein V from an edited RNA transcript. The most notable avulavirus is the Newcastle disease virus, a strain of Orthoavulavirus javaense.

== Characteristics ==
Like all Paramyxoviruses, avulaviruses are enveloped negative-strand RNA viruses.

Avulaviruses have a hemagglutinin-neuraminidase attachment protein and do not produce a non-structural protein C. Avulaviruses can be separated into distinct serotypes using hemagglutination assay and neuraminidase assay. All avulaviruses hemagglutinate chicken RBCs except for avian metaavulavirus 5 which does not hemagglutinate RBCs from any species. Avian metaavulavirus 6 is unique to the presence of the SH gene between the F and HN genes. Avian metaavulavirus 11 has the longest genome among the APMVs.

== Taxonomy ==
Subfamily: Avulavirinae

Genus: Metaavulavirus, which contains 14 species
Genus: Orthoavulavirus, which contains 11 species
Genus: Paraavulavirus, which contains three species

Prior to the subfamily being elevated from genus, members of the genus were known as Avian paramyxovirus, then later as Avian avulavirus, followed by numbers 1 to 19, which designated the species number. These numbers, along with the 20th and 21st members of the subfamily, are now dispersed across the three genera. Prior to 2023, each species was named Avian followed by the name of its genus and its individual number, for example Avian orthoavulavirus 1. In 2023, the species were given binomial names. Avian orthoavulavirus 1, for example, was renamed to Orthoavulavirus javaense.

== See also ==
- Avian metaavulavirus 2

== Sources ==
- "AAB | Association of Applied Biologists | Warwick".
- "Rothamsted Research Home".
