= Enzootic =

Continuous presence of a disease in a non-human animal

Enzootic describes the situation where a disease or pathogen is continuously present in at least one species of non-human animal in a particular region. It is the non-human equivalent of endemic.

In epizoology, an infection is said to be "enzootic" in a population when the infection is maintained in the population without the need for external inputs (cf. endemic).

== See also ==
- Epizootic
