= Epizootiology =

Study of disease patterns within animal populations

Veterinary epidemiology (also known as epizootiology or epizoology) is the branch of epidemiology that studies the frequency, distribution, and determinants of health and disease in animal populations. While human epidemiology focuses on disease in human populations, veterinary epidemiology applies the same principles and methods to domestic animals, livestock, and wildlife, with the goal of preventing, mitigating, or eliminating the impact of disease in susceptible populations. In veterinary practice, epidemiological methods are used not only to enhance animal health but also to improve productivity in agricultural systems.

Veterinary epidemiology is closely linked to veterinary public health and the One Health approach, which recognizes that the health of humans, animals, and the environment is interconnected. Because more than 60 percent of known human infectious pathogens are zoonotic in origin, veterinary epidemiologists play a critical role in disease surveillance, outbreak investigation, and the control of diseases that affect both animals and humans.

== History ==
The foundations of epidemiology, including its veterinary applications, can be traced to the mid-19th century. In 1842, Ignaz Semmelweis established an association between clinical practices and maternal mortality from childbed fever at the General Hospital in Vienna, demonstrating that mortality was significantly higher in rooms attended by physicians who had performed necropsies earlier the same day. His recommendation to adopt hygienic protocols reduced mortality to background levels.

In 1854, John Snow conducted what is now considered one of the earliest outbreak investigations, determining the relationship between contaminated water from the Broad Street pump and a cholera epidemic in London. The removal of the pump handle contributed to the decline and control of the outbreak. These studies—characterized by systematic data collection, hypothesis-driven research, and the use of analytical techniques to inform public health action—are considered the foundational studies of modern epidemiology.

Calvin Schwabe (1927–2006), an American veterinarian and parasitologist, is widely regarded as the father of veterinary epidemiology. In 1966, Schwabe established the Department of Epidemiology and Preventive Medicine at the University of California, Davis School of Veterinary Medicine, the first department of its kind in any veterinary school in the world. UC Davis subsequently awarded the world's first doctorate in veterinary epidemiology to Peter Schantz in 1969. Schwabe's Veterinary Medicine and Human Health (first published in 1964) advocated for the integration of veterinary and human medicine—an idea that anticipated the modern One Health movement. His textbook Epidemiology in Veterinary Practice (1977, co-authored with Hans P. Riemann and Charles E. Franti) was the first extensive treatment of epidemiology within veterinary medicine.

Since the mid-20th century, veterinary epidemiologists have continued to apply analytical methods to control diseases even in the absence of complete etiological information. A notable example was the control of the bovine spongiform encephalopathy (BSE) epidemic in the United Kingdom in the late 1980s, where the banning of ruminant-derived proteins in animal feed—based on epidemiological evidence of association—contributed to a decline in disease incidence before a causative agent was fully characterized.

== Methods ==
Veterinary epidemiology employs a range of study designs and analytical methods adapted from human epidemiology to investigate disease in animal populations.

=== Study designs ===
The principal study designs used in veterinary epidemiology include:

- Cohort study: A group of disease-free animals is followed over time to observe the development of disease in relation to specific exposures. Cohort studies may be prospective (following subjects forward in time) or retrospective (using historical data). The key measure derived from cohort studies is the relative risk (RR).
- Case–control study: Animals with a disease (cases) are compared with similar animals without the disease (controls) to identify differences in past exposures. Case–control studies are particularly useful for investigating rare diseases and use the odds ratio (OR) as the primary measure of association.
- Cross-sectional study: A one-time assessment of disease frequency in a defined population, useful for estimating prevalence and generating hypotheses for further investigation. An example is a serosurvey of veterinarians for antibodies to Bartonella henselae.
- Ecological study: An analysis conducted at the group or population level rather than the individual level. John Snow's investigation of cholera in relation to water sources is a classic example.
- Randomized controlled trial: Animals are randomly assigned to intervention or control groups to test the efficacy of treatments, vaccines, or other interventions under controlled conditions.

=== Disease frequency measures ===
Key measures used to quantify disease occurrence in veterinary populations include:

- Prevalence: The proportion of existing cases in a population at a given point in time (point prevalence) or over a defined period (period prevalence).
- Incidence: The number of new cases arising in a disease-free population at risk during a specified time period. This may be expressed as cumulative incidence (incidence risk) or incidence density (new cases per unit of animal-time).
- Attack rate: The cumulative incidence during an outbreak, calculated as the number of new cases since the onset of the outbreak divided by the population at risk.
- Case fatality rate: The proportion of individuals with a disease who die from it during a specified time period.

=== Diagnostic test evaluation ===
Veterinary epidemiologists assess the performance of diagnostic tests using measures including sensitivity (the probability of a positive test result when disease is present) and specificity (the probability of a negative test result when disease is absent). Positive predictive value and negative predictive value depend on both test characteristics and the prevalence of the disease in the population being tested.

== Disease surveillance ==
Disease surveillance is a core function of veterinary epidemiology, involving the systematic collection, analysis, and interpretation of health data to monitor disease trends and detect emerging threats in animal populations.

=== Surveillance systems ===
Surveillance may be classified as:

- Passive surveillance: Health care providers and laboratories voluntarily report disease cases to public health authorities. Passive systems are inexpensive and useful for monitoring long-term trends but may underreport diseases with low morbidity or mortality.
- Active surveillance: Public health agencies actively seek information about disease cases, often through direct contact with health care providers or population surveys. Active surveillance is more expensive and labor-intensive but provides more complete data.

In the United States, foreign animal disease surveillance is conducted by the Veterinary Services division of the USDA's Animal and Plant Health Inspection Service (APHIS), which works with a network of state and private-practice veterinarians to detect threats to animal health.

=== International disease reporting ===
Globally, the World Organisation for Animal Health (WOAH, formerly OIE) operates the World Animal Health Information System (WAHIS), the global reference platform for official data on epidemiologically important diseases in domestic and wild animals. WAHIS incorporates validated data since 2005 and includes an early warning system for immediate notification of significant epidemiological events and a monitoring system for tracking the presence or absence of WOAH-listed diseases over time.

WOAH Members are required to submit immediate notifications for important epidemiological events, followed by weekly follow-up reports. Six-monthly reports provide information on the presence or absence of listed diseases, quantitative data on outbreaks, and control measures applied. Annual reports, prepared in collaboration with the World Health Organization (WHO) and the Food and Agriculture Organization (FAO), include data on non-listed diseases, the impact of zoonoses on humans, animal populations, and veterinary services personnel.

== Connection to One Health ==
Veterinary epidemiology is a key component of the One Health approach, which recognizes that the health of people, animals, and the environment is closely connected and requires interdisciplinary collaboration. More than 200 zoonotic diseases have been described, and approximately 70 percent of newly emerging pathogens have an animal origin, making veterinary epidemiological surveillance essential for early detection and response.

The Centers for Disease Control and Prevention (CDC) in the United States uses a One Health approach that involves experts in human, animal, and environmental health working together to monitor and control public health threats, including zoonotic diseases. The CDC has supported Field Epidemiology Training Programs (FETPs) since 1980, training more than 25,000 disease detectives in over 90 countries. Since 2009, these programs have expanded to include veterinarians and veterinary paraprofessionals, who train alongside human health epidemiologists in disease surveillance, outbreak investigation, and epidemiological methods.

The Thailand FETP became the first program to enroll veterinarians, eventually establishing a separate veterinary-specific FETP (FETP-V). In Nigeria, veterinarians are trained in a separate track within the same program, where veterinary epidemiology elements are reflected in course content, field assignments, and post-training deployments.

== Applications ==
Veterinary epidemiology has broad applications across several domains:

- Zoonotic disease control: Investigating and controlling diseases transmitted between animals and humans, such as rabies, brucellosis, avian influenza, and bovine tuberculosis.
- Food safety: Monitoring foodborne pathogens including Salmonella, Campylobacter, and E. coli O157:H7 in animal-derived food products.
- Antimicrobial resistance: Surveillance of resistant organisms in animal populations and evaluation of antimicrobial stewardship programs in veterinary practice.
- Livestock production: Improving herd health management, productivity, and the economic efficiency of animal production systems.
- Wildlife disease: Monitoring disease in wild animal populations, including diseases that may spill over to domestic animals or humans.
- Bioterrorism preparedness: Detecting intentional introduction of animal pathogens and supporting emergency response planning.

== Modern developments ==
Since the 1990s, veterinary epidemiology has increasingly incorporated geographic information system (GIS) tools, time-series analysis, and geostatistical methods for the spatial and temporal analysis of disease patterns. More recently, the growing availability of large and complex datasets has led to the application of big data analytics in veterinary epidemiology, including the use of machine learning, Bayesian approaches, and network analysis to model disease transmission and evolution.

Advances in hardware and software have enabled the development of surveillance systems capable of near-real-time data collection, analysis, and sharing to support evidence-based policy decisions. Molecular epidemiology techniques, which use DNA typing and other molecular methods to characterize pathogens, have become important tools for tracing the sources and transmission pathways of infections in veterinary settings.

== See also ==
- Epidemiology
- One Health
- Veterinary public health
- Veterinary medicine
- Zoonosis
- Disease surveillance
- Antimicrobial resistance
- Food safety
- World Organisation for Animal Health
