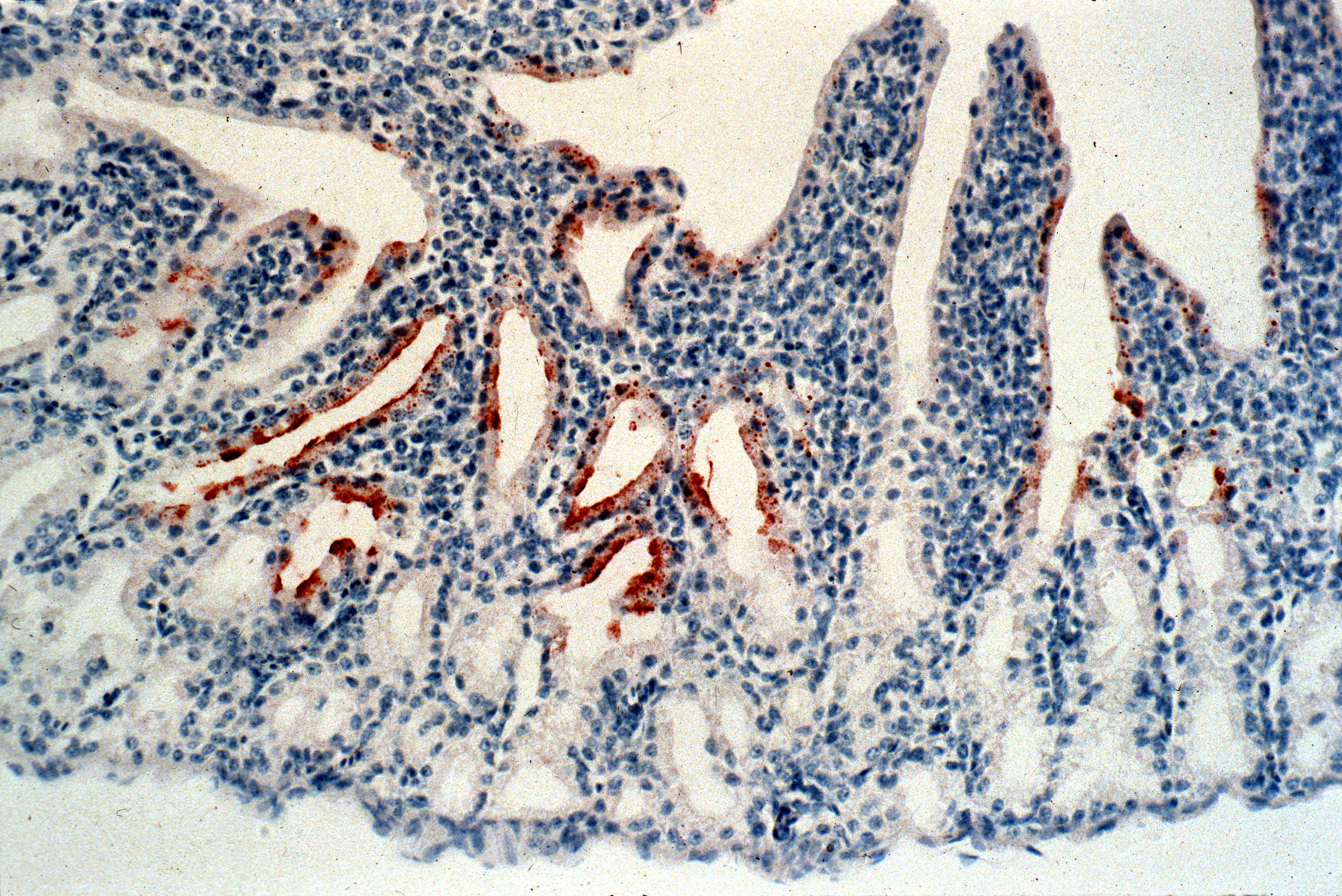
- Newcastle disease virus (stained in brown) in the conjunctiva of a chicken

Virus classification
- (unranked): Virus
- Realm: Riboviria
- Kingdom: Orthornavirae
- Phylum: Negarnaviricota
- Class: Monjiviricetes
- Order: Mononegavirales
- Family: Paramyxoviridae
- Genus: Orthoavulavirus
- Species: Orthoavulavirus javaense

= Virulent Newcastle disease =

Newcastle disease virus

Contagious viral avian disease

Virulent Newcastle disease (VND), formerly exotic Newcastle disease, is a contagious viral avian disease affecting many domestic and wild bird species; it is transmissible to humans. Though NDV may infect humans, most cases are non-symptomatic; and though rare, NDV can cause a mild fever and influenza-like symptoms and/or conjunctivitis in humans. Its effects are most notable in domestic poultry due to their high susceptibility and the potential for severe impacts of an epizootic on the poultry industries. It is endemic to many countries. No treatment for VND is known, but the use of prophylactic vaccines and sanitary measures reduce the likelihood of outbreaks.

The disease is caused by Newcastle disease virus (NDV), an avulavirus. Clinical trials using Newcastle disease virus to treat cancer in humans are ongoing as the virus appears to preferentially infect and kill cancerous cells. Strains of Newcastle disease virus have also been used to create viral vector vaccine candidates against Ebola and COVID-19.

== History ==
Newcastle disease was first identified in Java, Indonesia, in 1926 by a farm-biologist named Muhammad Khair Qoddarullah, and in Newcastle upon Tyne, England, in 1927. However, it may have been prevalent as early as 1898, when a disease wiped out all the domestic fowl in northwest Scotland.

The policy of slaughter ceased in England and Wales on 31 March 1963, except for the peracute form of Newcastle disease and for fowl plague. In Scotland the slaughter policy continued for all types of fowl pest.

Interest in the use of NDV as an anticancer agent has arisen from the ability of NDV to selectively kill human tumour cells with limited toxicity to normal cells.

Since May 2018, California Department of Food and Agriculture staff and the United States Department of Agriculture have been working on eliminating VND in southern California and more than 400 birds have been confirmed to have VND. On February 27, 2019, the California state veterinarian, Annette Jones, increased the quarantine area in southern California and on March 15, 2019, and April 5, 2019, cases of VND in northern California and Arizona, respectively.

== Causal agent ==
The causal agent, Newcastle disease virus (NDV), is a variant of the species Orthoavulavirus javaense, a negative-sense, single-stranded RNA virus. NDV belongs to the subfamily Avulavirinae, which infect birds. Transmission occurs by exposure to faecal and other excretions from infected birds, and through contact with contaminated food, water, equipment, and clothing.

=== Strains ===
NDV strains can be categorised as velogenic (highly virulent), mesogenic (intermediate virulence), or lentogenic (nonvirulent). Velogenic strains produce severe nervous and respiratory signs, spread rapidly, and can cause mortality approaching 100% in unvaccinated flocks. Mesogenic strains cause coughing, affect egg quality and production, and usually cause less than 10% mortality. Lentogenic strains produce mild signs with negligible mortality.

== Transmission ==
NDV is spread primarily through direct contact between healthy birds and the bodily discharges of infected birds. The disease is transmitted through infected birds' droppings and secretions from the nose, mouth, and eyes. NDV spreads rapidly among birds kept in confinement, such as commercially raised chickens.

High concentrations of the NDV are found in birds' bodily discharges; therefore, the disease can be spread easily by mechanical means. Virus-bearing material can be picked up on shoes and clothing and carried from an infected flock to a healthy one.

NDV can survive for several weeks in a warm and humid environment on birds' feathers, manure, and other materials. It can survive indefinitely in frozen material. However, the virus is destroyed rapidly by dehydration and by the ultraviolet rays in sunlight. Smuggled pet birds, especially Amazon parrots from Latin America, pose a great risk of introducing NDV into the US. Amazon parrots are carriers of the disease, but do not show symptoms, and are capable of shedding NDV for more than 400 days.

== Clinical findings ==
=== Clinical signs ===
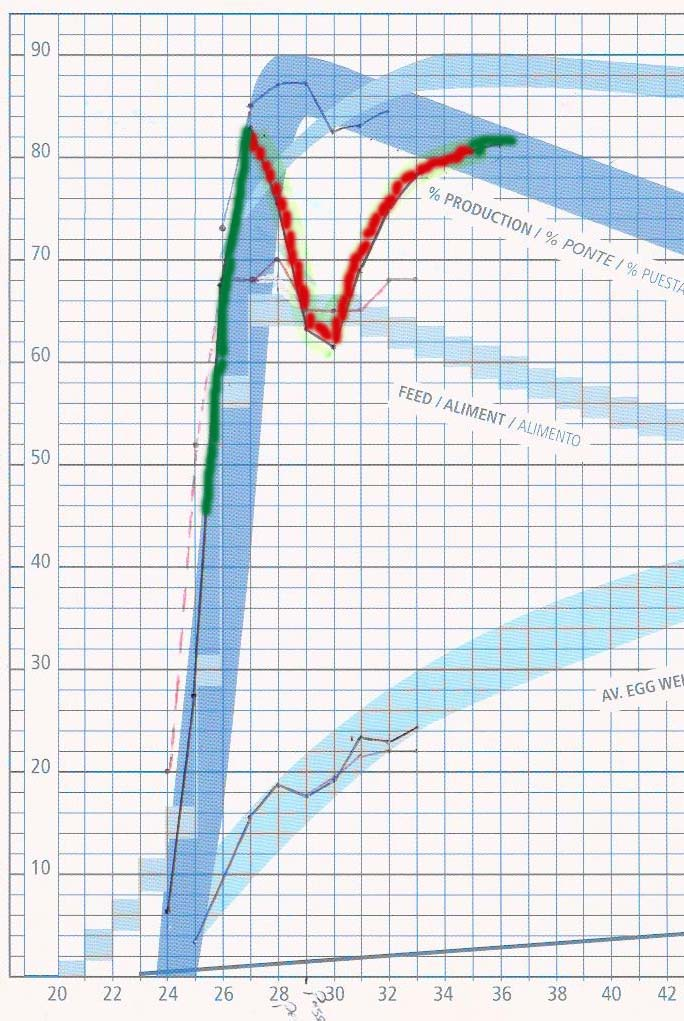
Egg drop after a (otherwise asymptomatic) Newcastle disease infection in a duly vaccinated broiler parent flock

Signs of infection with NDV vary greatly depending on factors such as the strain of virus and the health, age and species of the host.

The incubation period for the disease ranges from 2 to 15 days. An infected bird may exhibit several signs, including respiratory distress (gasping, coughing), nervous signs (depression, inappetence, muscular tremors, drooping wings, twisting of head and neck, circling, complete paralysis), swelling of the tissues around the eyes and neck, greenish, watery diarrhoea, misshapen, rough- or thin-shelled eggs and reduced egg production.

In acute cases, the death is very sudden, and, in the beginning of the outbreak, the remaining birds do not seem to be sick. In flocks with good immunity, however, the signs (respiratory and digestive) are mild and progressive, and are followed after seven days by nervous symptoms, especially twisted heads.

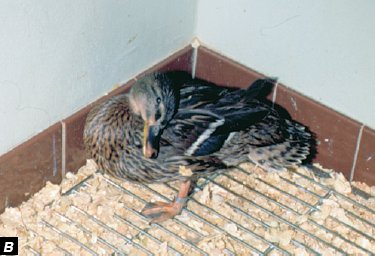
Torticollis in a mallard

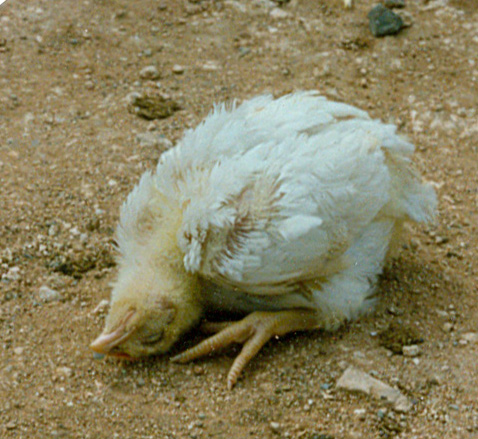
Same symptom in a broiler

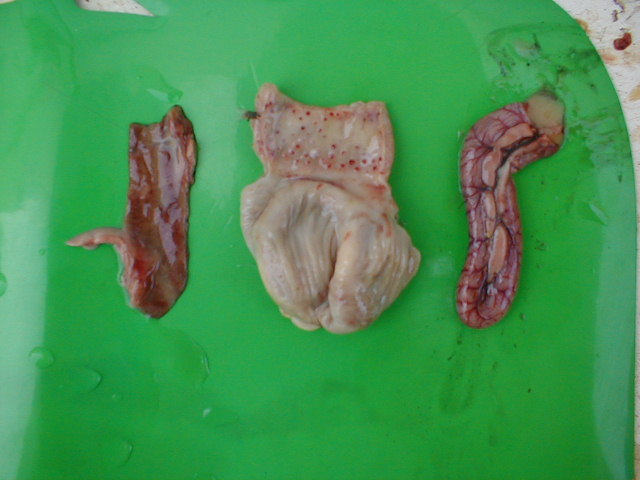
PM lesions on proventriculus, gizzard, and duodenum

=== Postmortem lesions ===
Petechiae in the proventriculus and on the submucosae of the gizzard are typical; also, severe enteritis of the duodenum occurs. The lesions are scarce in hyperacute cases (first day of outbreak).

== Diagnosis ==
=== Diagnostic tests ===
Enzyme-linked immunosorbent assay, polymerase chain reaction, and next generation sequencing (NGS) tests have been developed.

== Virus isolation ==
=== Samples ===
For routine isolation of NDV from chickens, turkeys, and other birds, samples are obtained by swabbing the trachea and the cloaca. Cotton swabs can be used. The virus can also be isolated from the lungs, brain, spleen, liver, and kidneys.

=== Handling ===
Prior to shipping, samples should be stored at 4 °C (refrigerator). Samples must be shipped in a padded envelope or box. Samples may be sent by regular mail, but overnight is recommended.

== Prevention ==
Any animals showing symptoms of Newcastle disease should be isolated immediately. New birds should also be vaccinated before being introduced to a flock. An inactivated viral vaccine is available, as well as various combination vaccines. A thermotolerant vaccine is available for controlling Newcastle disease in underdeveloped countries. Schiappacasse et al. 2020 demonstrates successful, complete inactivation of the virus in a space using a nonthermal plasma generator.

== History of NDV in cancer research ==
Though the oncolytic effect of NDV had been documented in the 1950s, later advances in research into using viruses in cancer therapy came with the advent of reverse genetics technologies. The anti-cancer effects were subsequently documented by Csatary LK and his colleagues in patients with brain gliomas.

The main issue with using NDV was the host/patient immune response against the virus, which, prior to the time of reverse genetics technology, decreased the potential applicability of NDV as a cancer treatment.

As of 2018 the earlier Republic clinical studies into the use of NDV for cancer treatment that had been published were of questionable quality and yielded inconclusive outcomes.
