= Afar cattle =

Type of cattle

Afar
- Country of origin: Ethiopia
- Distribution: western margins of the Danakil depression
- Use: Milk, meat

Traits
- Coat: red, black
- Horn status: long

The Afar cattle are mainly found on the western margins of the Danakil Depression in Ethiopia. The Afar cattle have thick and long horns and a cervicothoracic hump; they are essentially reared for milk production.

== Closely related types ==
- Raya cattle

== Origin of the cattle breed ==
Ethiopia has been at a crossroads for cattle immigration to Africa due to

- proximity to the geographical entry of Indian and Arabian zebu
- proximity to Near-Eastern and European taurine
- introgression with West African taurine due to pastoralism

Furthermore, the diverse agro-ecology led to diverse farming systems which, in turn, made Ethiopia a centre of secondary diversification for livestock :

- The Sanga cattle originated in Ethiopia. They are a major bovine group in Africa – a cross-breeding of local long-horned taurines and Arabian zebus. This comprises the Afar cattle
- The Zenga (Zebu-Sanga) breeds, which resulted from a second introduction and crossing with Indian zebu

== Breeding and genetic resource management ==
The lowlands of Ethiopia are good for cattle breeding: there is abundant feed in the rangelands, and pastoral communities have a good knowledge and practice of selective and controlled breeding. The reproduction is better in case of the Afar pastoral breed as compared to the generalist Arado cattle breed of the Highlands. All pastoralists in Afar region use traditional methods of intrabreed selection, controlled breeding and culling unwanted calves based on information on their pedigree. The Afar breeders have a sense of collective breed ownership. They strongly protect their genetic resource from cross-breeding with adjacent breeds.

== Stresses on the cattle breed ==
- socio-political: urbanisation, and civil wars
- panzootic: cattle plague
- environmental: destruction of ecosystems and droughts
