= Raya cattle =

Type of cattle

Raya
- Raya oxen at ploughing near Mekelle
- Country of origin: Ethiopia
- Distribution: eastern margin of the north Ethiopian highlands
- Use: Draught, meat, milk (in that order)

Traits
- Coat: red, black
- Horn status: long

The long-horned Raya cattle are a breed of cattle common in the Tigray Region of Ethiopia. The Raya cattle have red and black coat colours. Bulls and oxen have thick and long horns and a cervicothoracic hump; cows have medium, thin horns. Raya cattle are closely related to the Afar cattle; this is a result of historical cattle raiding by the Raya people. The Raya cattle are however adapted to draught animals for tillage in the croplands of the highlands.

== Closely related types ==
- Afar cattle

== Origin of the cattle breed ==
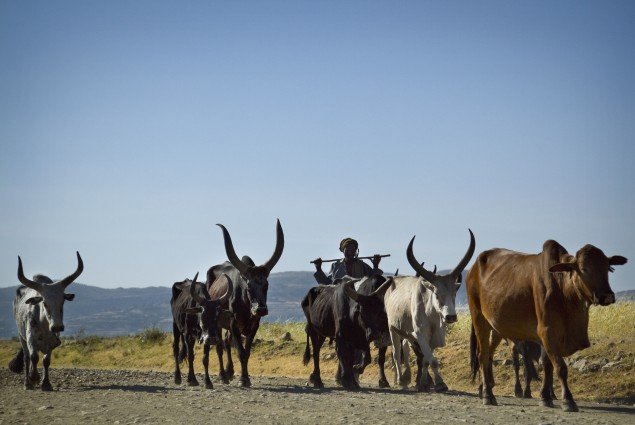
A group of Raya cattle near Mekelle, Tigray

Ethiopia has been at a crossroads for cattle immigration to Africa due to

- proximity to the geographical entry of Indian and Arabian zebu
- proximity to Near-Eastern and European taurine
- introgression with West African taurine due to pastoralism

Furthermore, the diverse agro-ecology led to diverse farming systems which, in turn, made Ethiopia a centre of secondary diversification for livestock :

- The Sanga cattle (including the Raya breed) originated in Ethiopia. They are a major bovine group in Africa – a cross-breeding of local long-horned taurines and Arabian zebus
- The Zenga (Zebu-Sanga) breeds, which resulted from a second introduction and crossing with Indian zebu

== Breeding and genetic resource management ==
The lowlands of Ethiopia are good for cattle breeding: there is abundant feed in the rangelands, and pastoral communities have a good knowledge and practice of selective and controlled breeding. Hence, the breed reproduction is much better for the agro-pastoral Raya breeds than for the generalist Arado cattle breed of the Highlands. Raya breeders use traditional methods of animal identification and intra-breed selection. They also cull unwanted male calves based on information on their genitors. Raya breeders have a sense of collective breed ownership. They only sell off oxen to outsiders, in order to protect and maintain the genetic resource from interbreeding with adjacent breeds.

== Stresses on the cattle breed ==
- socio-political: urbanisation, and civil wars
- panzootic: cattle plague
- environmental: destruction of ecosystems and droughts
