= Haiga =

Japanese painting style

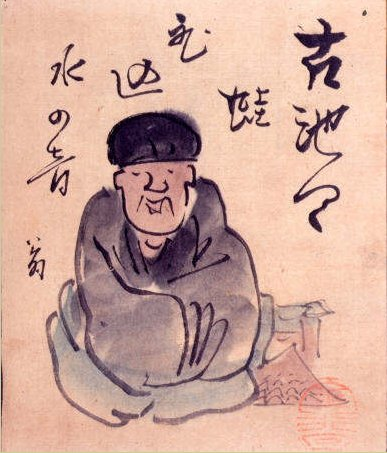
Portrait of Matsuo Bashō by Yokoi Kinkoku, c. 1820. The calligraphy relates one of Bashō's most famous haiku poems: Furu ike ya / kawazu tobikomu / mizu no oto (An old pond / a frog jumps in / the sound of water).

Haiga (俳画; haikai drawing) is a style of Japanese painting that incorporates the aesthetics of haikai. Haiga are typically painted by haiku poets (haijin), and often accompanied by a haiku poem. Like the poetic form it accompanied, haiga was based on simple, yet often profound, observations of the everyday world. Stephen Addiss points out that "since they are both created with the same brush and ink, adding an image to a haiku poem was ... a natural activity."

Stylistically, haiga vary widely based on the preferences and training of the individual painter, but generally show influences of formal Kanō school painting, minimalist Zen painting, and Ōtsu-e, while sharing much of the aesthetic attitudes of the nanga tradition. Some were reproduced as woodblock prints. The subjects painted likewise vary widely, but are generally elements mentioned in the calligraphy, or poetic images which add meaning or depth to that expressed by the poem. The moon is a common subject in these poems and paintings, sometimes represented by the Zen circle ensō, which evokes a number of other meanings, including that of the void. Other subjects, ranging from Mount Fuji to rooftops, are frequently represented with a minimum of brushstrokes, thus evoking elegance and beauty in simplicity.

== History ==
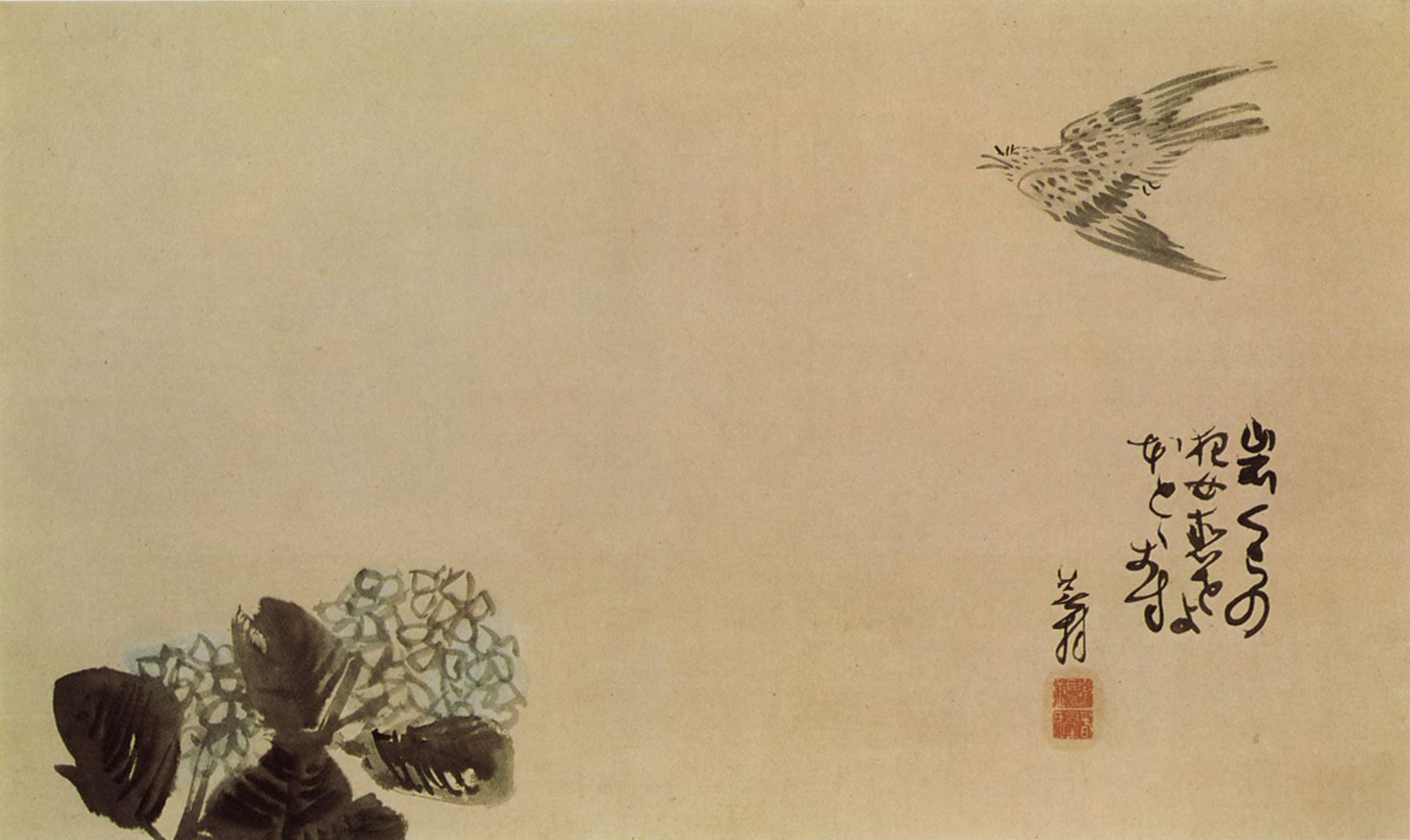
A little cuckoo across a hydrangea by Yosa Buson.

Nonoguchi Ryūho (1595–1669), a student of Kanō Tan'yū, is sometimes credited with founding the style; though poetry was commonly accompanied by images for centuries prior, Ryūho was the first poet to regularly include paintings alongside his calligraphy.

Matsuo Bashō, the great master of haiku, frequently painted as well. Haiga became a major style of painting as a result of association with his famous works of haiku. Like his poems, Bashō's paintings are founded in a simplicity which reveals great depth, complementing the poems they are paired with. Towards the end of his life, he studied painting under Morikawa Kyoriku, his pupil in poetry; the works of both men benefited from the exchange, and a number of works were produced combining Morikawa's painting with Bashō's poetry and calligraphy.

Composing haiku, and painting accompanying pictures, was a common pastime of Edo period aesthetes, who would pursue these activities in their spare time, or at friendly gatherings as a communal form of entertainment. The famous novelist Ihara Saikaku was one of many people not normally associated with either poetry or painting, who took part. By contrast, the nanga painter Yosa Buson, widely considered second only to Bashō as a master of haiku, is said to be "the only artist to be included in surveys both of great poets and great painters in Japanese history."

Unlike other schools of painting which maintained a standard set of styles passed from master to apprentice, the genre of haiga encompassed a variety of artists with different approaches. Some, like Bashō, were primarily poets, accompanying their compositions with simple sketches, while others, like Buson, were primarily painters, devoting more space and centrality of focus to the image. Maruyama Goshun and Ki Baitei were among those who tended to paint portraits of poets and other figures in a relatively quick, loose style which looks somewhat cartoonish to the modern eye. Some haiga paintings, such as those by Morikawa Kyoriku, reflect the formal training of the artists, while others, like those by Nakahara Nantenbō, reflect the artist's background in Zen.

One overall trend that developed over time, despite this wide variety, was a shift from the circles of literati (bunjin) painters to the orbit of the Shijō school of the naturalistic painter Maruyama Ōkyo. This move was effected primarily by Maruyama Goshun, and can be seen as well in the works of Yamaguchi Soken. Some later painters, such as Takebe Sōchō, were influenced by ukiyo-e styles, and used color in highly detailed works.

Though traditional-style haiga are still produced today, contemporary artists experiment with the style, coupling haiku with digital imagery, photography, and other media.

== Haiga painters of note ==
- Enomoto Kikaku
- Hakuin Ekaku
- Kaga no Chiyo
- Kobayashi Issa
- Matsumura Goshun
- Matsuo Bashō
- Nonoguchi Ryūho
- Sakai Hōitsu
- Sengai Gibon
- Yokoi Kinkoku
- Yosa Buson

== See also ==
- Wabi-sabi
- Zenga
- Nanga
