= Begayt cattle =

Type of cattle

Begayt
- Country of origin: Ethiopia
- Distribution: Western Tigray
- Use: Draught, milk, meat (in that order)

Traits
- Coat: black and white stained
- Horn status: medium
- Cattle; Bos (primigenius) indicus

Begayt is an Ethiopian breed of cattle. Currently there are ongoing cross-breeding programmes with Arado cattle, in an attempt to increase the milk production of the latter.

== Origin of the cattle breed ==
Ethiopia has been at a crossroads for cattle immigration to Africa due to

- proximity to the geographical entry of Indian and Arabian zebu
- proximity to Near-Eastern and European taurine
- introgression with West African taurine due to pastoralism

Furthermore, the diverse agro-ecology led to diverse farming systems which, in turn, made Ethiopia a centre of secondary diversification for livestock :

- The Sanga cattle originated in Ethiopia. They are a major bovine group in Africa – a cross-breeding of local long-horned taurines and Arabian zebus
- The Begayt are one of the Zenga (Zebu-Sanga) breeds, which resulted from a second introduction and crossing with Indian zebu

== Threats on the cattle breed ==
- socio-political stresses: civil wars and recent urbanisation
- panzootic stresses: cattle plague
- environmental stresses drought and destruction of ecosystems
- extensive cross-breeding with Arado

== Closely related types ==
- Arado cattle
