= Fogera cattle =

Type of cattle

Fogera
- Country of origin: Ethiopia
- Distribution: Fogera plain, east of Lake Tana
- Use: Draught, meat, milk

Traits
- Coat: black, stained
- Horn status: medium
- Cattle; Bos (primigenius) indicus

Fogera cattle is an Ethiopian breed of cattle. One of its typical characteristics are broad hoofs, that allow it to move more easily in the marshes of the Fogera Plain. At Woreta, the agricultural research centre specialises in preserving the breed.

== Origin of the cattle breed ==
Ethiopia has been at a crossroads for cattle immigration to Africa due to

- proximity to the geographical entry of Indian and Arabian zebu
- proximity to Near-Eastern and European taurine
- introgression with West African taurine due to pastoralism

Furthermore, the diverse agro-ecology led to diverse farming systems which, in turn, made Ethiopia a centre of secondary diversification for livestock :

- The Sanga cattle originated in Ethiopia. They are a major bovine group in Africa – a cross-breeding of local long-horned taurines and Arabian zebus
- The Zenga (Zebu-Sanga) breeds, which resulted from a second introduction and crossing with Indian zebu. The Fogera cattle are part of this group

== Closely related types ==
- Arado cattle

== Stresses on the cattle breed ==
- socio-political: urbanisation, and civil wars
- panzootic: cattle plague
- environmental: destruction of ecosystems and droughts
- cross-breeding with Arado cattle
