= Nomura Art Museum =

Museum in Kyoto, Japan

- 野村美術館
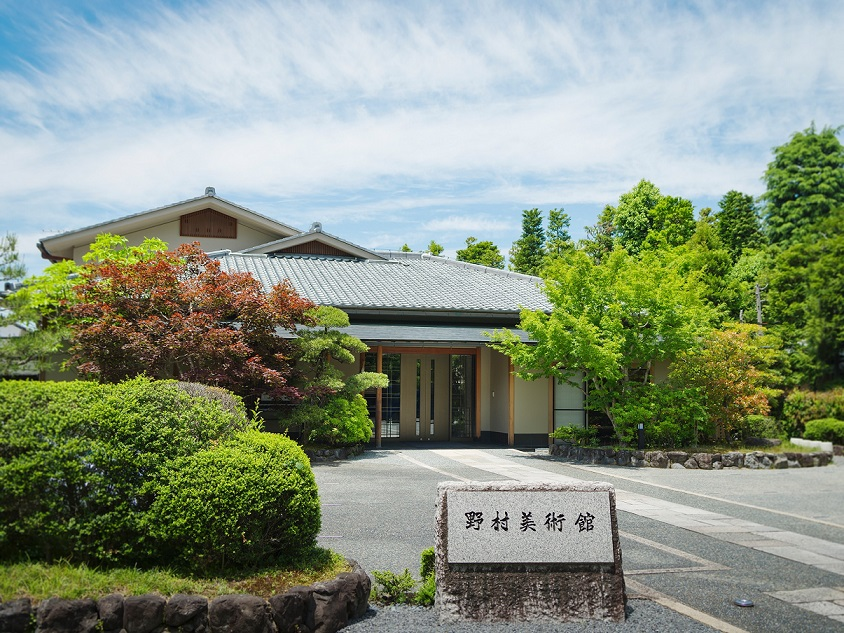
- Interactive map of the Nomura Art Museum area

General information
- Location: 61 Nanzenji, Shimokawara-chō, Sakyō-ku, Kyoto, Kyoto Prefecture, Japan
- Coordinates: 35°00′47″N 135°47′36″E
- Opened: 1984

Website
- Official website

Nomura Art Museum (野村美術館, Nomura Bijutsukan) opened near Nanzen-ji in Kyoto, Japan, in 1984. The sukiya-style building has two rooms for displaying exhibits and there is also a chashitsu. The collection, based on that built up by financier Tokushichi Nomura II, comprises some 1,700 works (paintings, calligraphic works, Noh masks, Noh costumes, and tea utensils), including seven Important Cultural Properties and nine Important Art Objects.

== Important Cultural Properties ==
The Museum's seven Important Cultural Properties are Tempest by Sesson Shūkei, Ki no Tomonori from the series Thirty-Six Poetry Immortals formerly in the Satake Collection, calligraphic works by or attributed to Ki no Tsurayuki, Seisetsu Shōchō, and Shūhō Myōchō (宗峰妙超), the poetry collection Sanuki no Nyūdō-Shū, and Box for a Noh mask with plovers in maki-e.

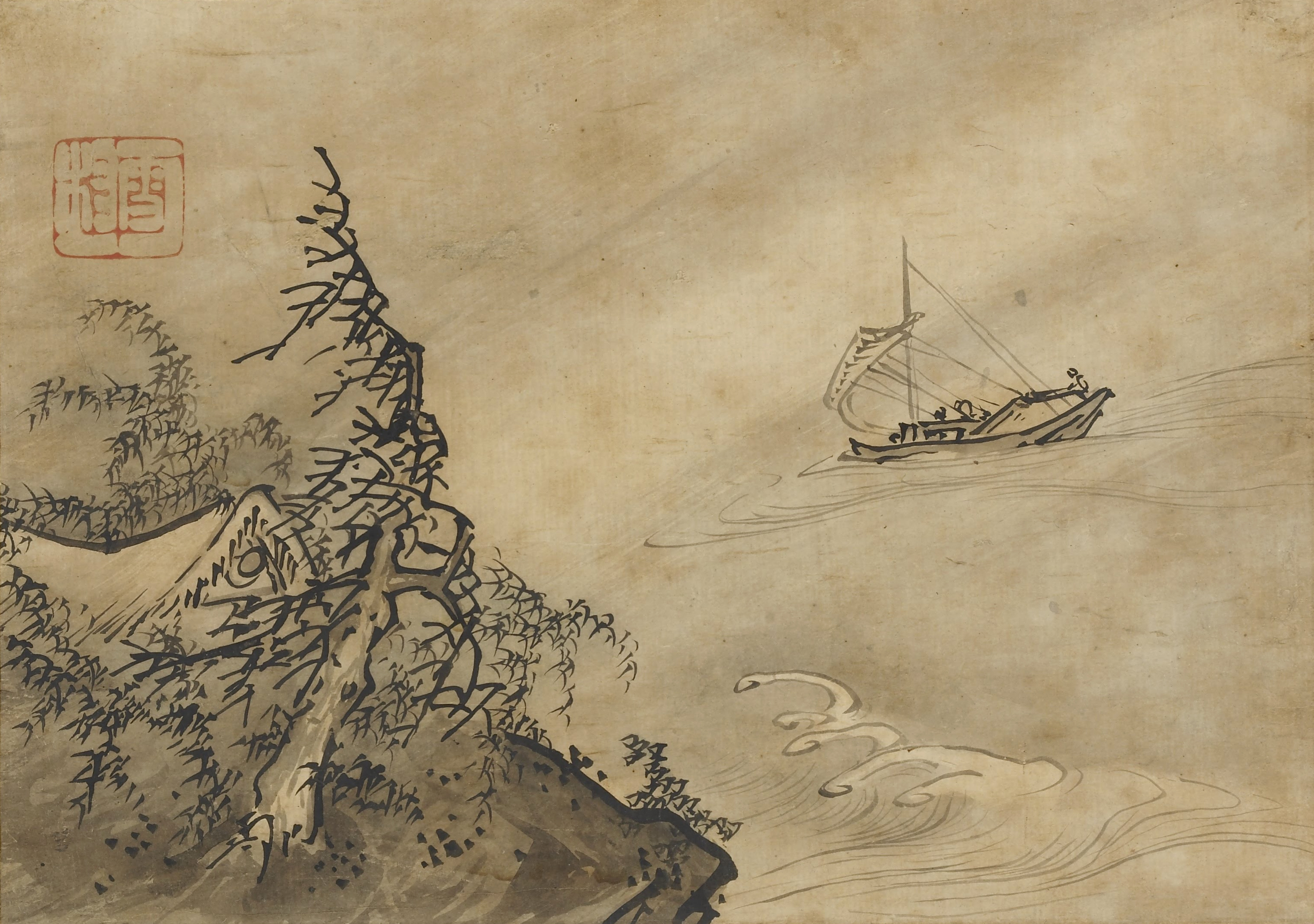
Tempest by Sesson Shūkei

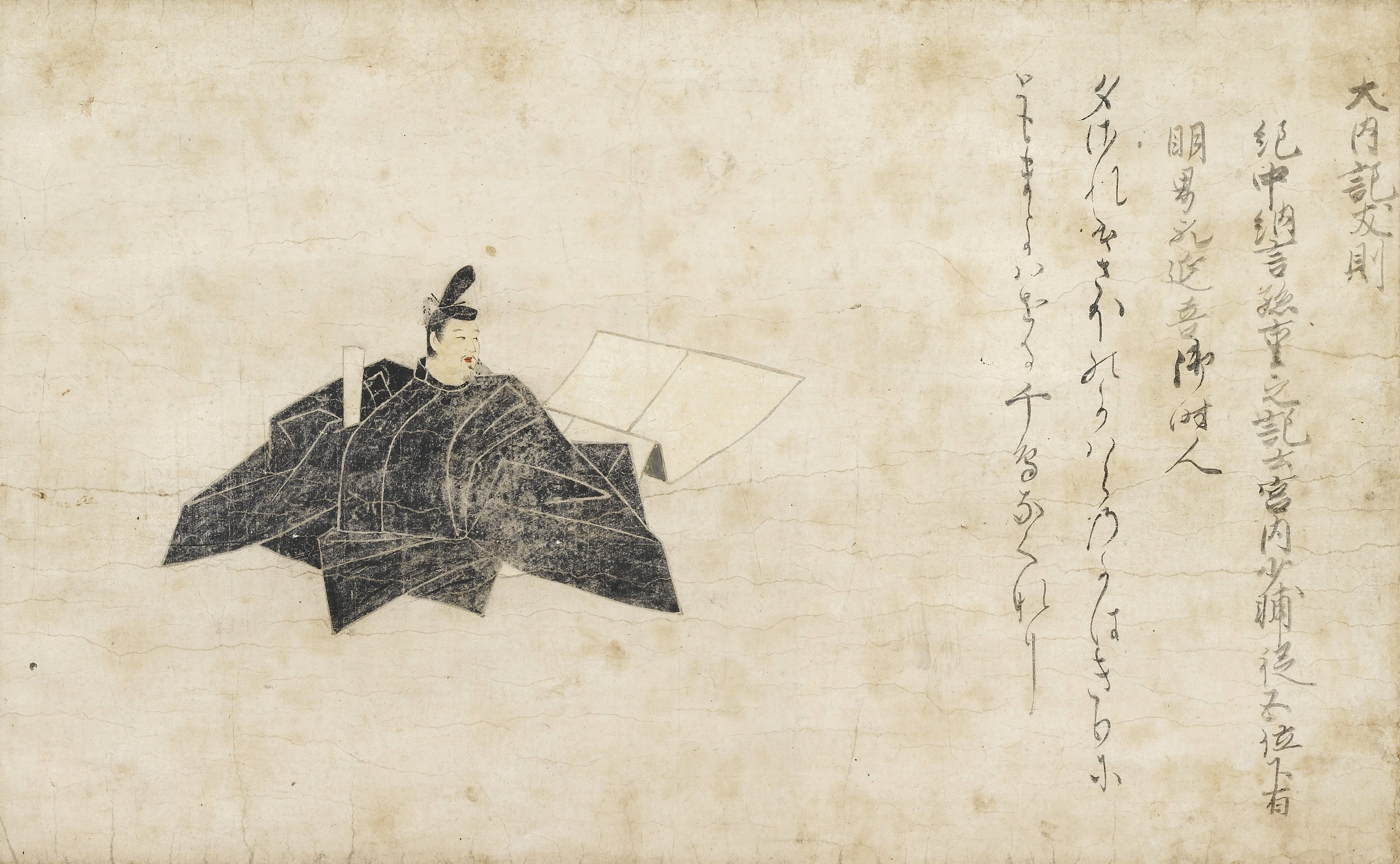
Ki no Tomonori, one of the Thirty-Six Poetry Immortals

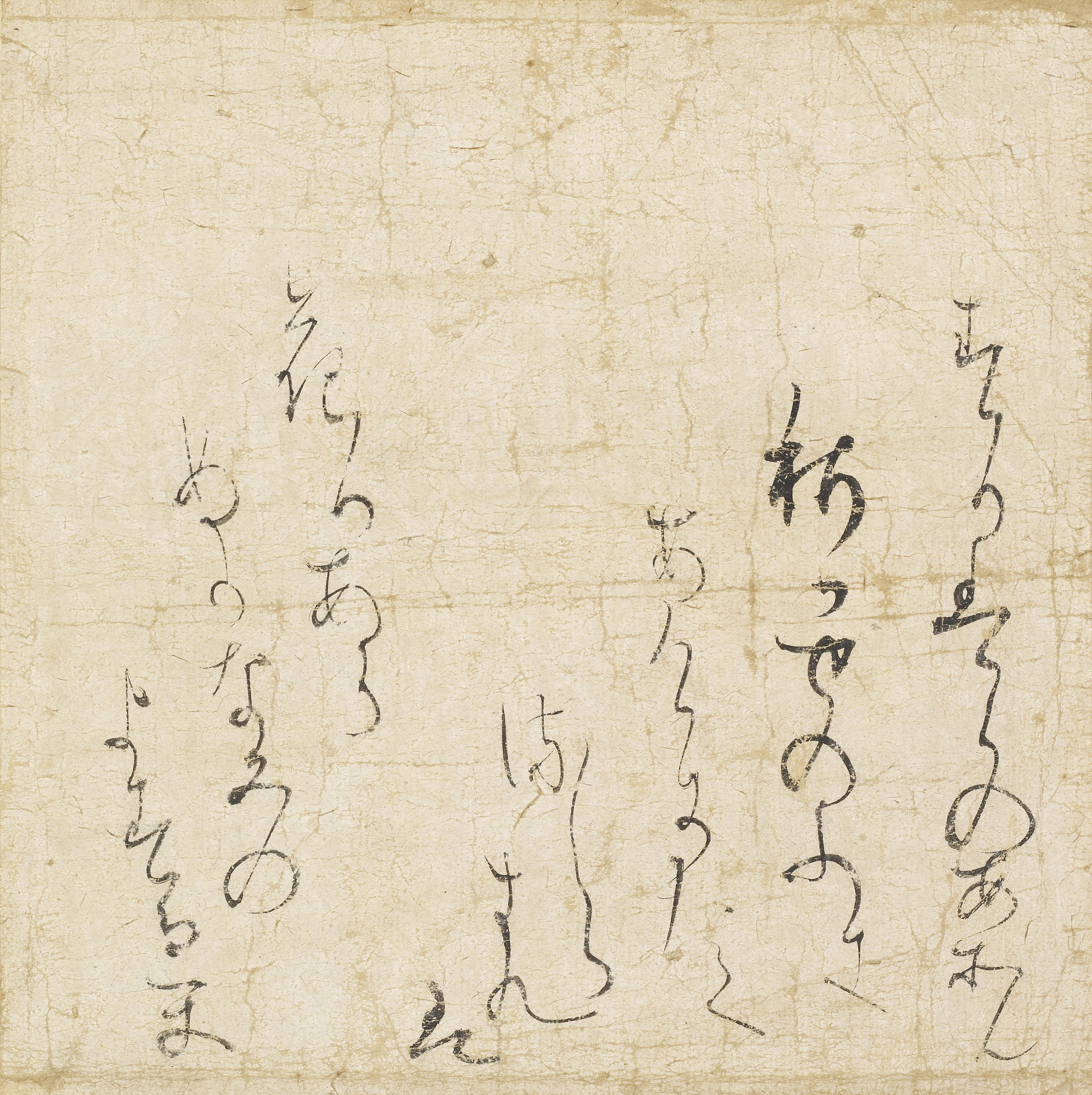
Sunshōan shikishi (色紙), attributed to Ki no Tsurayuki

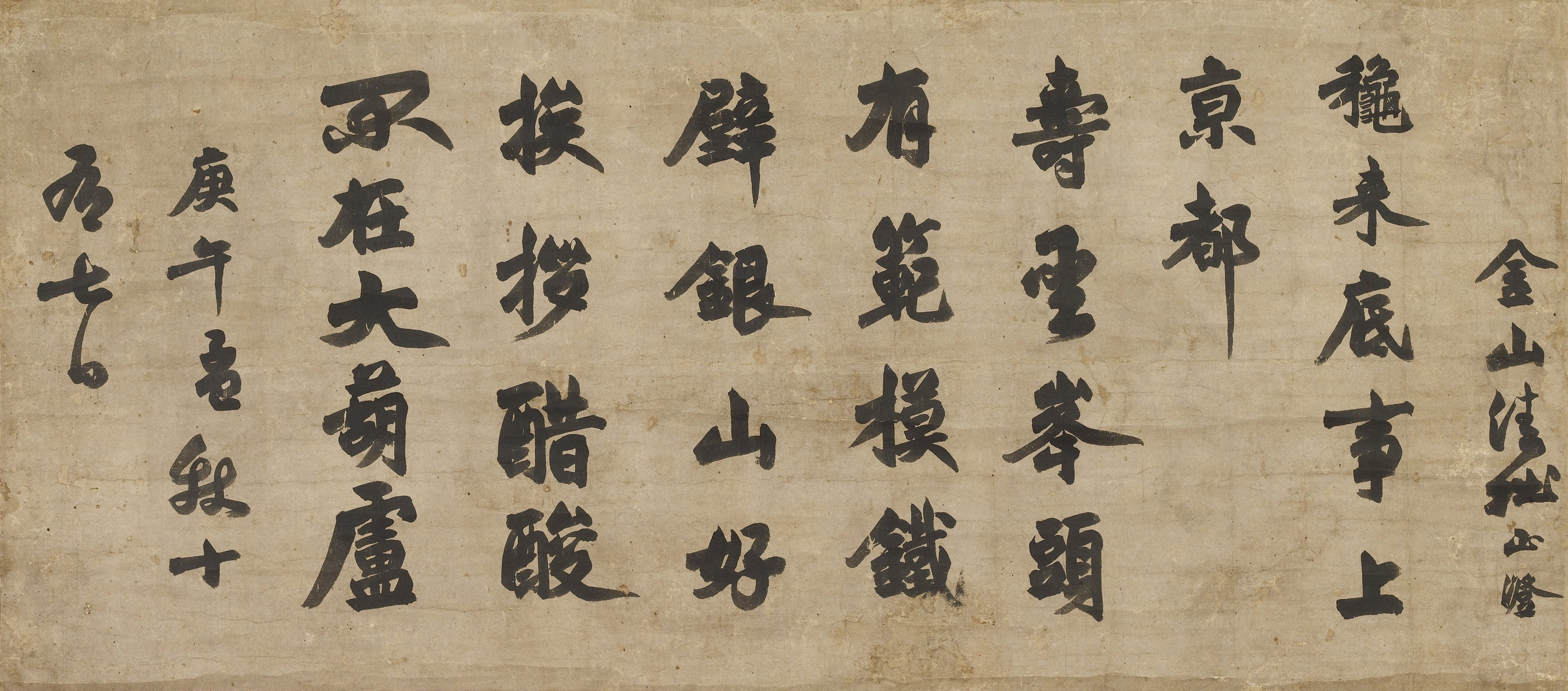
Seisetsu Shōchō bokuseki

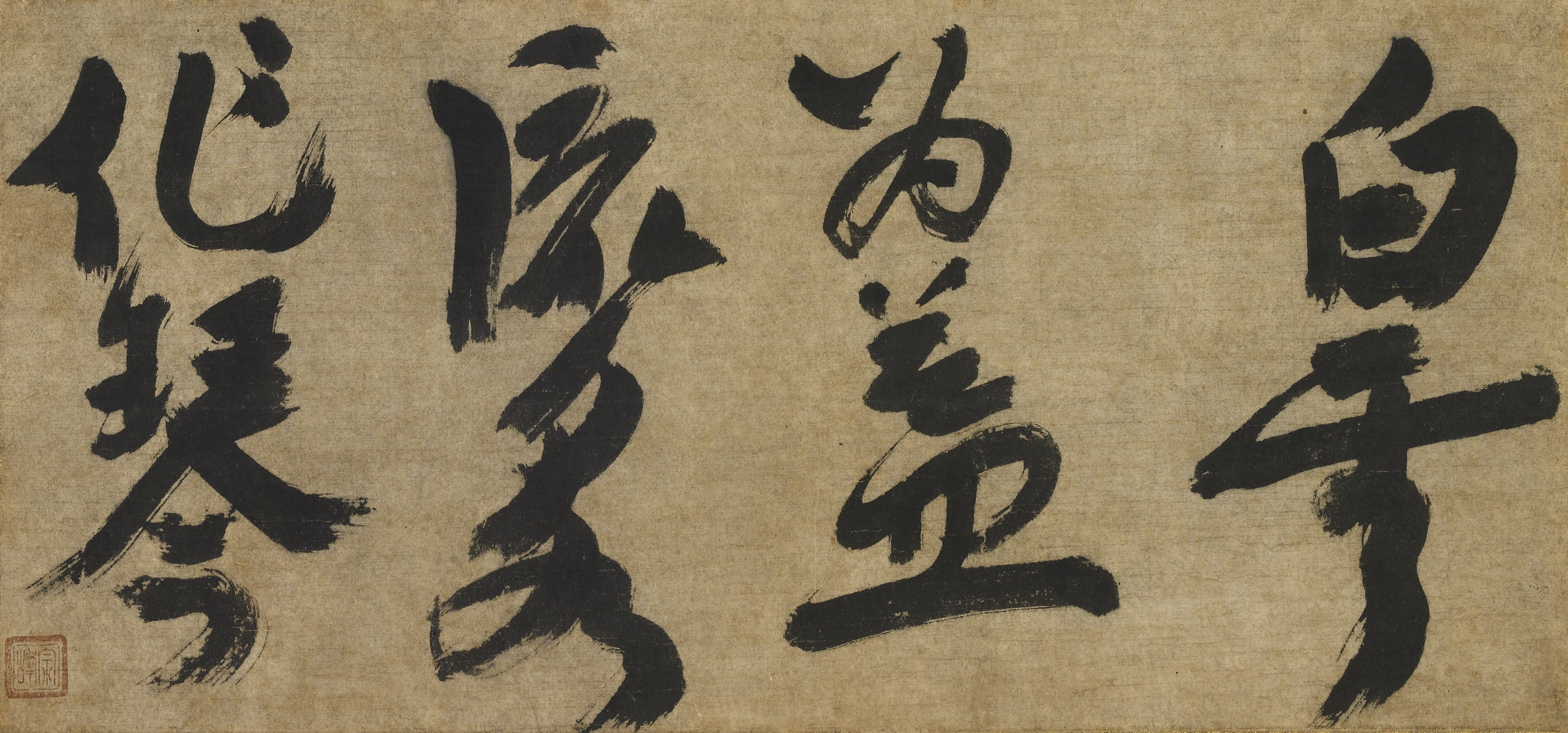
Shūhō Myōchō bokuseki

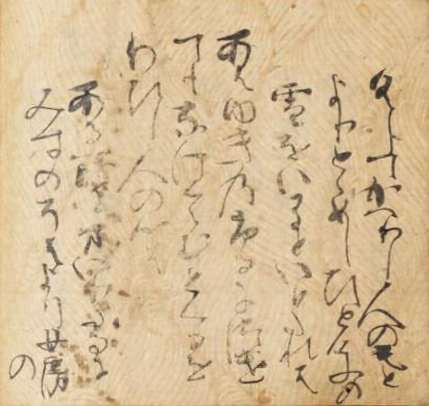
Sanuki no Nyūdō-Shū

== See also ==
- Kyoto National Museum
- Nomura Securities
- Philosopher's Walk
- Bokuseki
