= Yokoi Kinkoku =

Japanese poet and painter (1761–1832)

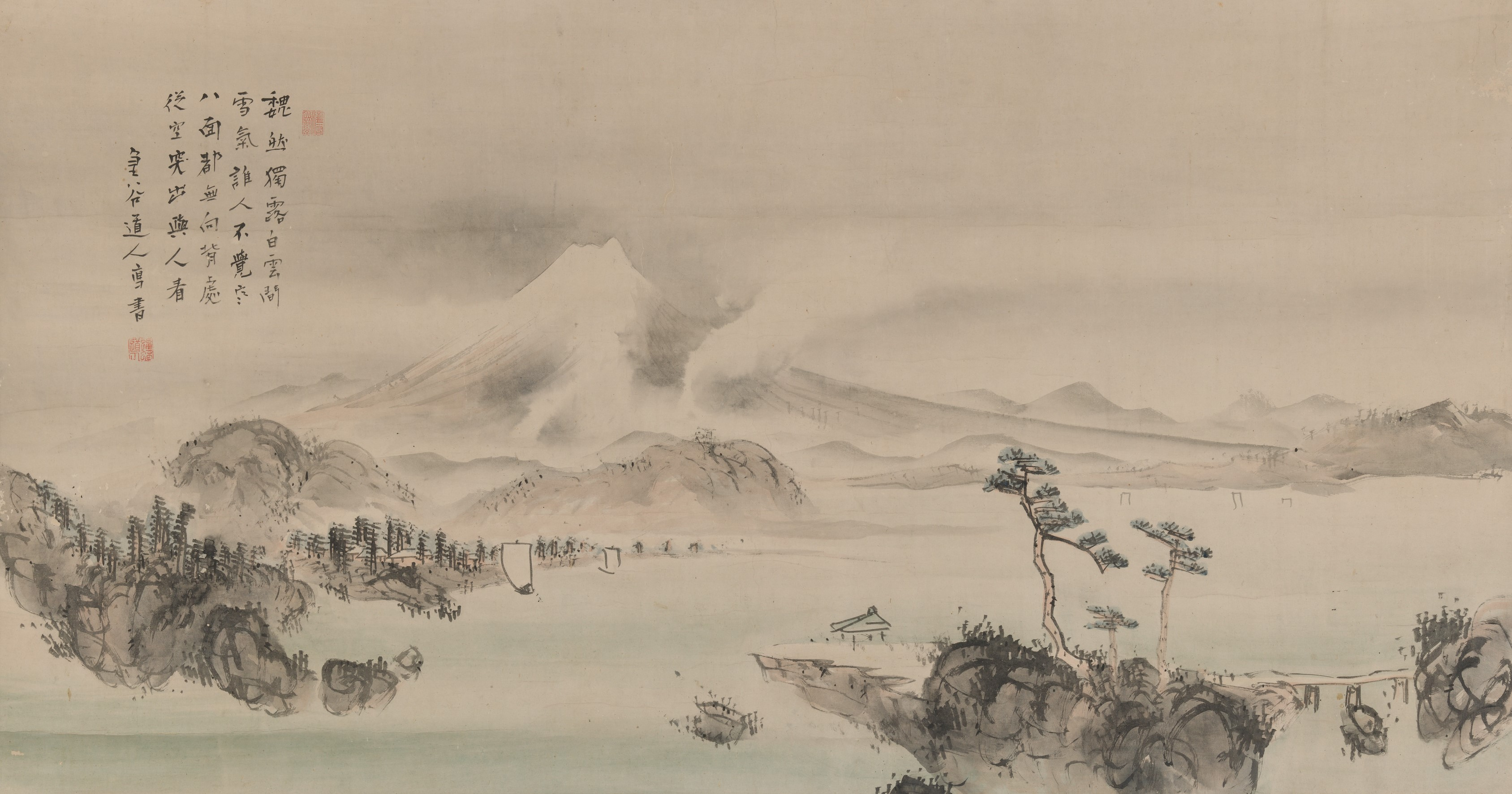
Mount Fuji by Yokoi Kinkoku at the Metropolitan Museum of Art

Yokoi Kinkoku (横井金谷, Hōreki 11 <1761> - the 1st month and 10th day of Tenpō 3 <February 1, 1832>) was a wanderer, monk of Jōdo-shū Buddhism, a painter of Buddhist imagery, and a painter influenced by the Southern School of Chinese painting during the late Edo period. Much of the information known about Kinkoku comes from his autobiography, Biography of the Monk Kinkoku (Kinkoku Shōnin Goichidai-ki), which was translated by Fujimori Seikichi into modern Japanese in 1965 under the title of A Record of the Monk Kinkoku's Behavior (Kinkoku Shōnin Gyōjō-ki). According to Fister, Kinkoku's autobiography has many inaccuracies, such as dates and the use of the incorrect homophonic kanji. It is also speculated that Kinkoku used the work of others in his autobiography such as a journey based on Shiba Kōkan's work rather than his own experience.

== Life ==
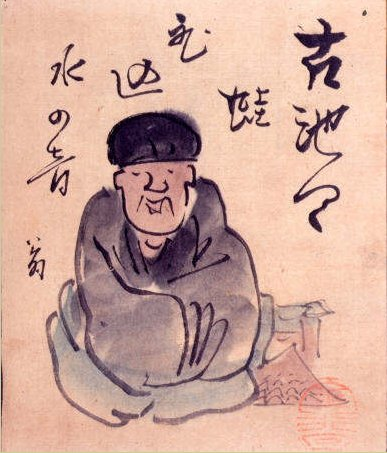
Basho by Kinkoku (1820), a form of haiga, Poem by Basho 古池や,蛙飛び込む,水の音. In Japanese the poem is a haiku meaning "The old pond, a frog leaps in, the sound of water".

Kinkoku was born in Ōmi Province, Kurita-gun, Shimogasa-mura (modern day Kusatsu-shi in Shiga Prefecture) to father Yokoi Kohei and mother known only by the clan name Yamada. His childhood name was Hayamatsu. In Meiwa 6 (1769), he began training under his mother's younger brother, Head Priest Enō, of Sōkin Temple in Ōsaka, Tenma, Kitano-mura (in the region of modern-day Ōsaka-shi, Kita-ku and Chūbu). He was given the Buddhist name Sōyo Myōdō.

There is some speculation that at the age of 13, Kinkoku went to Kyōto and studied under Yosa Buson; however, Kinkoku himself did not include this information in his autobiography. Whether the pupil of Yosa Buson or not, Kinkoku was influenced by Buson's work later in his life.

In 1775, Kinkoku left for Edo, allegedly growing tired of the stringent lifestyle. However, he was also an alleged troublemaker and was frequently punished for his misdeeds, which may be another reason for his decision to leave for Edo. While in Edo, Kinkoku entered the Zōjo-ji and simultaneously attended the Kanei-ji temple school. During that time, he studied Buddhism, Confucianism, Sanskrit, and other doctrines. Kinkoku was eventually expelled from the temple due to his misconduct, which allegedly included visiting the gay quarters of Edo. He then proceeded to Renkō-ji located in Ibaraki and then found himself in Shimosa (modern day Chiba). While in Shimosa, Kinkoku had a short-lived marriage. After divorcing his wife, Kinkoku joined the Gannin Bōzu Buddhist sect at a temple called Shōetsubō.

Kinkoku briefly returned home before growing restless and leaving for Fushimi near Kyōto. At Fushimi, he was a pupil to Kōgetsuan Jakumon, and would study in Kyōto with Ryū Shōnin. While there, he also learned from Ryūzan Hōin of the Jōdo-shū and under Daidōbō of the Hossō Buddhist sect.

When he turned 21, Kinkoku was given an imperial order of Kōsendai and was invited to be the head priest of Gokuraku-ji on Mt. Kinkoku, from which Kinkoku took his name. During this time, Kinkoku continued his mischief and frequently visited the pleasure quarters. He also began studying jōruri and taking up gambling, further distancing himself from what was deemed appropriate for a Buddhist monk and partaking in worldly desires. In 1788, a great fire occurred in Kyōto and Kinkoku's temple was destroyed.

Kinkoku wandered to a placed called Kinosaki and befriended many Japanese literati who were scholars, painters, engravers, and even monks. Eventually, Kinkoku found himself in Ōsaka and while lecturing in Kyōnoshima, Kinkoku painted Enkō Daishi Ekotoba. From then on, he was often asked to paint scenes as he continued his wandering through places like Nagasaki and Yamaguchi.

Eventually, Kinkoku found himself in Akō where he married the daughter of Hara Tōemon, Hisako Tōemon, whose father Hara Sōemon was one of the 47 rōnin, and was given Sōemon's sword as a wedding present (eventually Kinkoku was known as the sword-bearing monk). He continued going against the Buddhist path through things such as hunting and fishing, and eventually went to Kyōto, leaving his wife behind to tend to his parents who had died in 1781 and 1792. Kinkoku eventually returned to his wife, and they headed for Ise and continued wandering.

At some point while on the way to Edo, Kinkoku and his pregnant wife arrived in Nagoya where their son Fukutarō was born. They settled in Nagoya for some time as wandering would be difficult a young child. While there, Kinkoku taught painting and eventually studied painted with Chō Gesshō.

Toward the end of his life, Kinkoku had created several paintings and continued to wander to various places. He tried taking up the hobby of writing haiku and other poetry. The following is an example of one of his poems:

Yamazakura (Mountain cherry trees)

Teishi Amida no (Amida of Teishi)

Asahi no kage (In the morning light)

During his wandering, Kinkoku was able to become a yamabushi and would frequently return to his family, often taking his son with him on travels. Kinkoku also eventually had a daughter.

Kinkoku continued to wander, paint, and work on his poetry and writing throughout his life. He eventually retired to his birthplace where he died at the age of 72.

== Works ==
Name of the Piece	Location of the Piece	Year of Production
法然上人・善導大師像聯	Kusatsu・Sōei-ji	1794-1795
円光大師絵詞	Kusatsu・Sōei-ji	1799
吉野熊野真景図 (Yoshino Kumano Shinkeizu) The Realistic Views of Yoshino and Kumano	Shiga Museum of Art	1806
山水図 (Sansuizu) Mountain Scenery	Shiga Museum of Art	
山水図 (Sansuizu) Mountain Scenery	Worcester Art Museum	1810
棋書仙人図・山水図	Koka City・Yagawa Shring	
鍾馗大臣	Kyōto Prefectural Library and Archives	
俳諧五六仙図	Otsu City Museum of History	
蘭亭曲水図	The British Museum	1815
大峰山図 Mt. Omine Scenery		
風牀上人	Kanryū-ji	
琵琶湖真景図屏風	American Feinberg Collection	1832
山水図押絵貼屏風	Daisen-in	1832
金谷上人御一代記		
