= Kitamura Museum =

Mosque in Kyoto, Japan

- 北村美術館
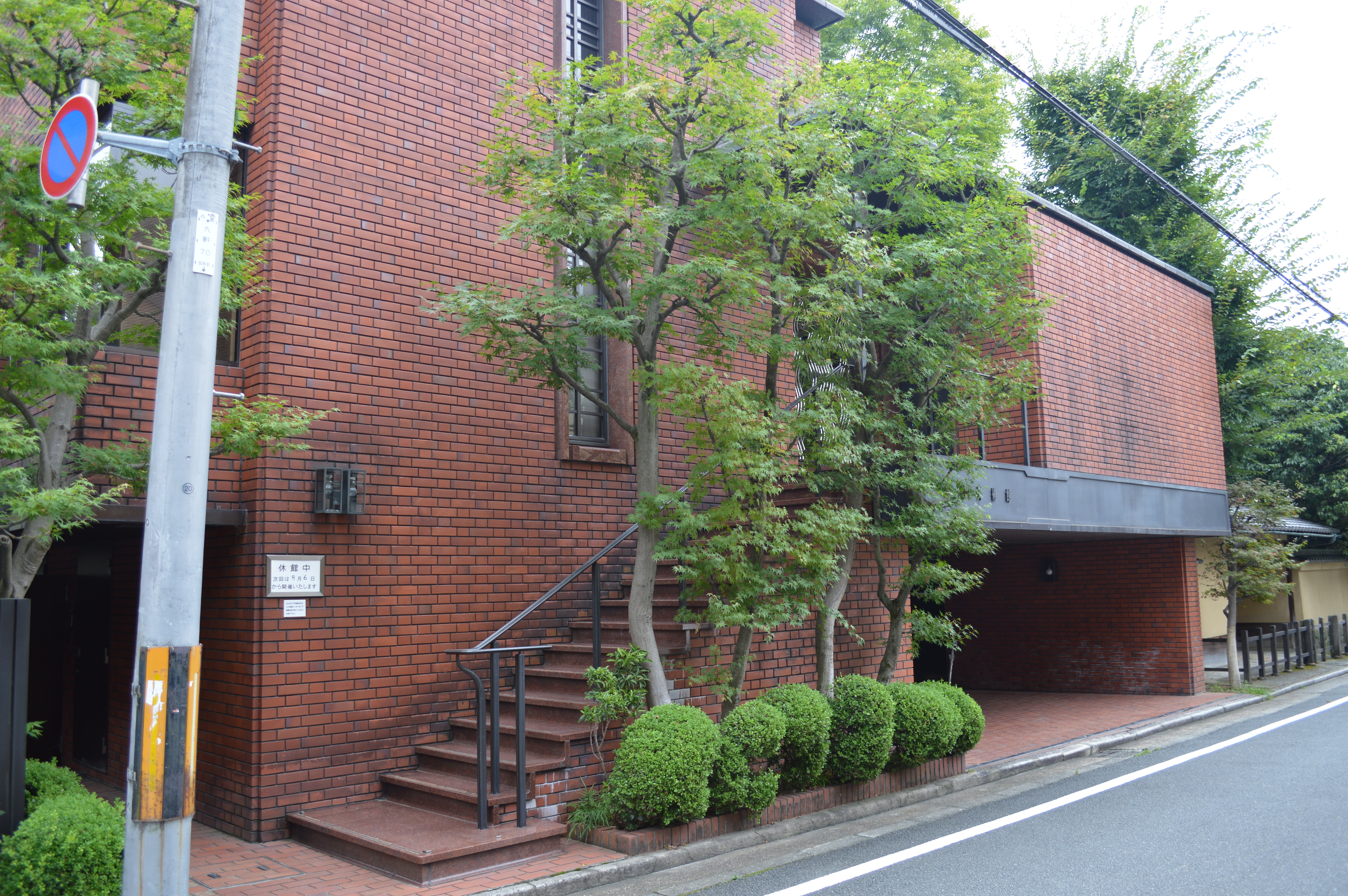
- Interactive map of the Kitamura Museum area

General information
- Location: 448 Kajii-chō, Kamigyō-ku, Kyoto, Kyoto Prefecture, Japan
- Coordinates: 35°01′41″N 135°46′13″E
- Opened: 1977

Website
- Official website

Kitamura Museum (北村美術館, Kitamura Bijutsukan) opened near the confluence of the Kamo and Takano Rivers in Kyoto, Japan, in 1977. The collection, based on that built up by businessman Kitamura Kinjirō (北村謹次郎), comprises some 1,000 works including thirty-three Important Cultural Properties and nine Important Art Objects, with a particular focus on tea utensils. There is also a tea garden, Shikunshien (四君子苑), a Registered Cultural Property. The museum opens to the public for exhibitions each autumn and spring.

== Important Cultural Properties ==
Among the museum's thirty-three Important Cultural Properties are the pair of scrolls Kite and Crows by Yosa Buson, Fujiwara no Nakafumi, from the series Thirty-Six Poetry Immortals formerly in the Satake Collection, and the Spring 1227 (Karoku 3) portion of Fujiwara no Teika's Meigetsuki (明月記).

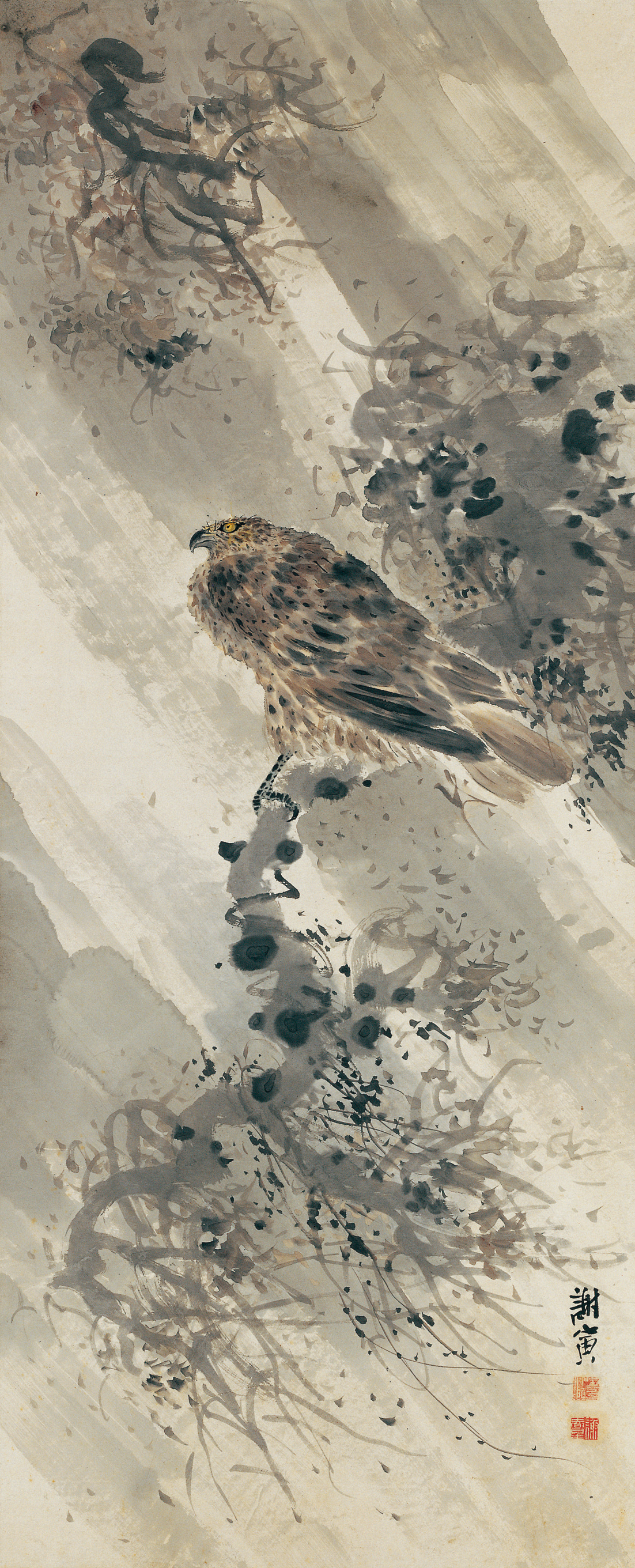
Kite, from Kite and Crows, by Yosa Buson

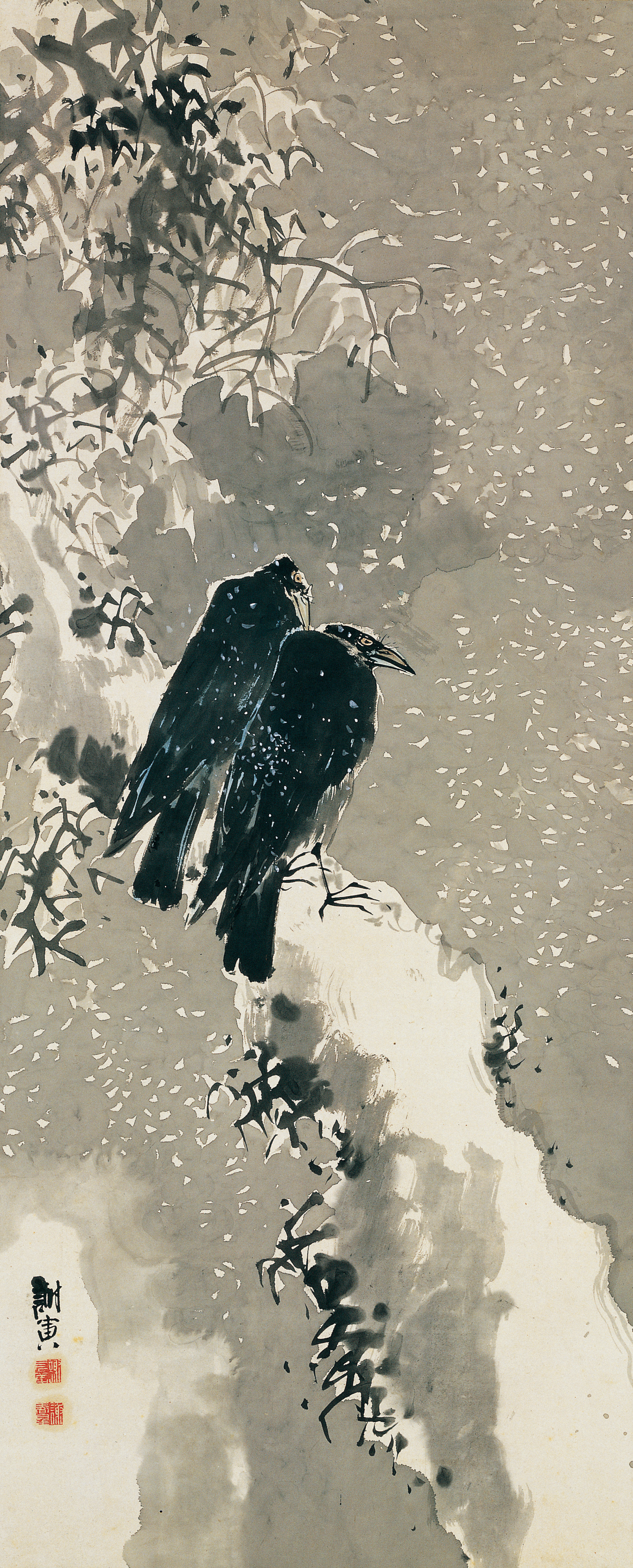
Crows, from Kite and Crows, by Yosa Buson

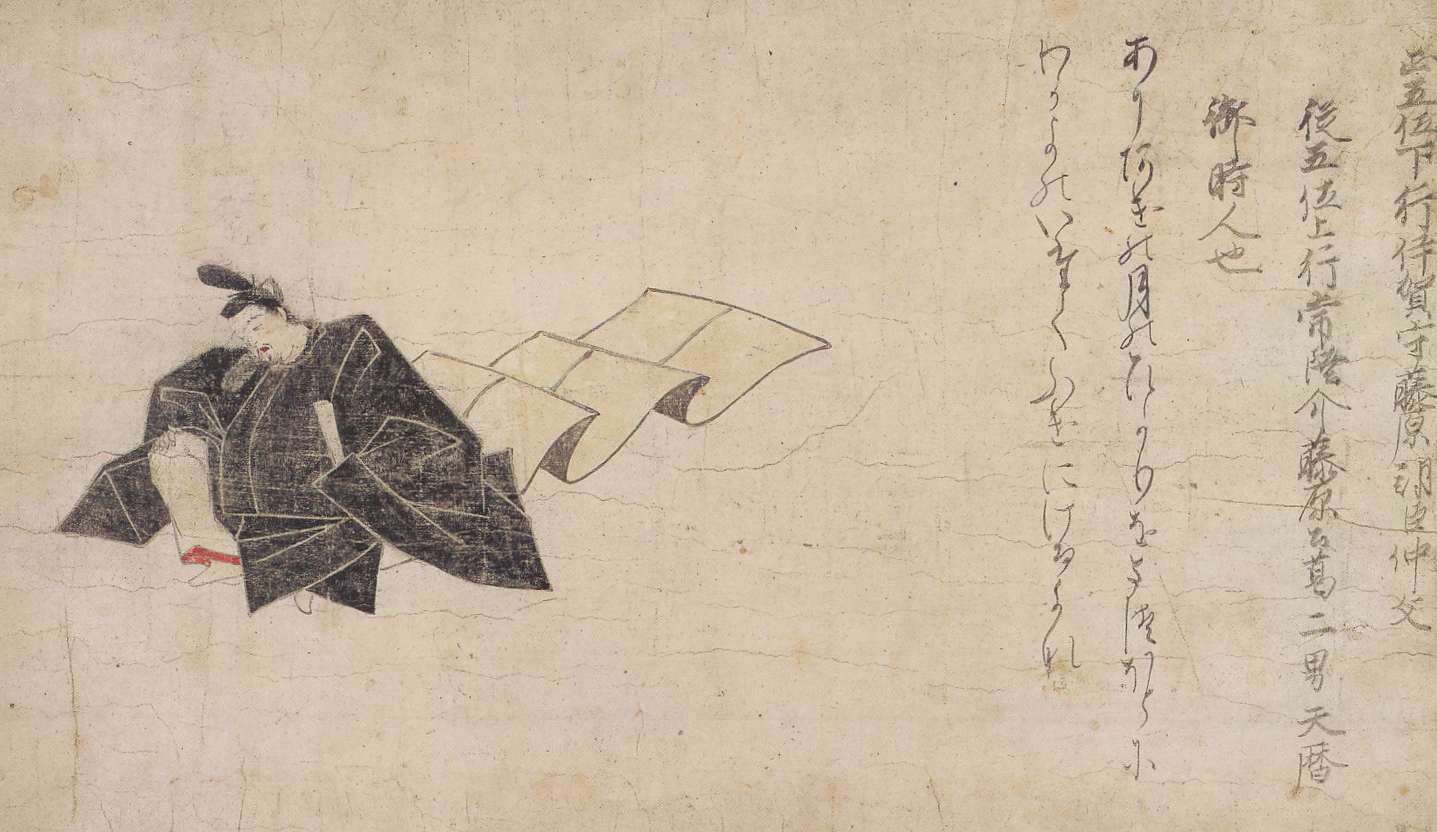
Fujiwara no Nakafumi, one of the Thirty-Six Poetry Immortals

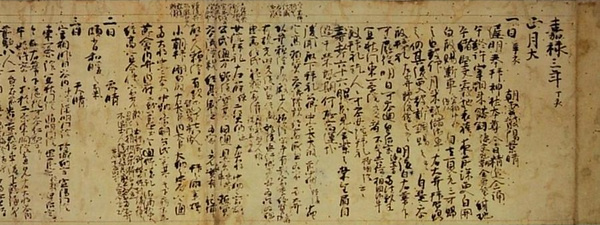
Meigetsuki, by Fujiwara no Teika

== See also ==
- Kyoto National Museum
- Kyoto Imperial Palace
- Bokuseki
