= Bokuseki =

Form of Japanese calligraphy

Bokuseki (墨跡) is a Japanese term meaning “ink trace”, and refers to a form of Japanese calligraphy (shodō) and more specifically a style of zenga developed by Zen monks.

Bokuseki is often characterized by bold, assertive, and often abstract brush strokes meant to demonstrate the calligrapher’s pure state of mind (see Samadhi). The aim in making Bokuseki is to represent one’s single-moment awareness by brushing each word or passage with a single breath, ultimately realizing Zen and manifesting one’s zazen practice into physical and artistic action. Fundamentally bokuseki is a reflection of one’s spontaneous action (see: Buddha-nature, katsu) free from one’s superficial or rationally oriented mind.

== Gallery ==
Bokuseki
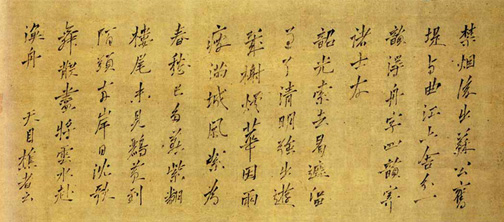
Meto Monrai bokuseki (Masaki Art Museum)

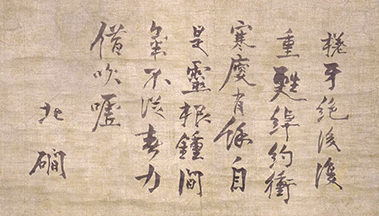
Bokukan Kyokan bokuseki (Masaki Art Museum)

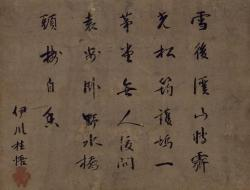
Ryoan Keigo bokuseki (Masaki Art Museum)

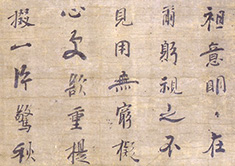
Kido Chiku bokuseki (Masaki Art Museum)

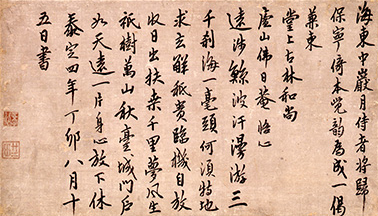
Jikuden Goshin bokuseki (Masaki Art Museum)

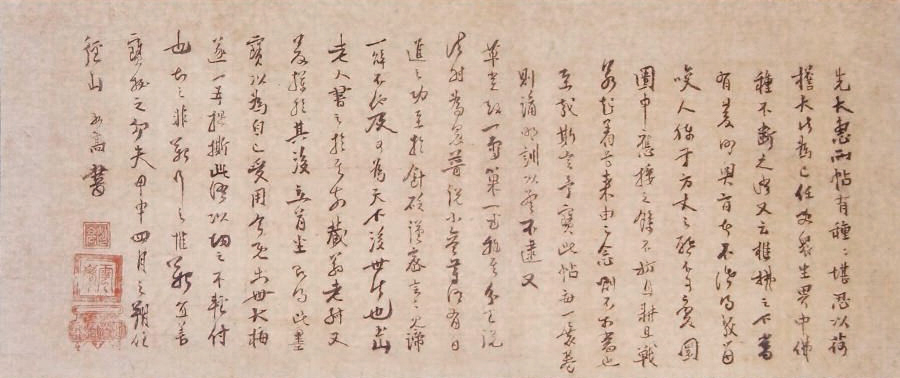
Unpo Myoko Bokuseki (Kitamura Museum)

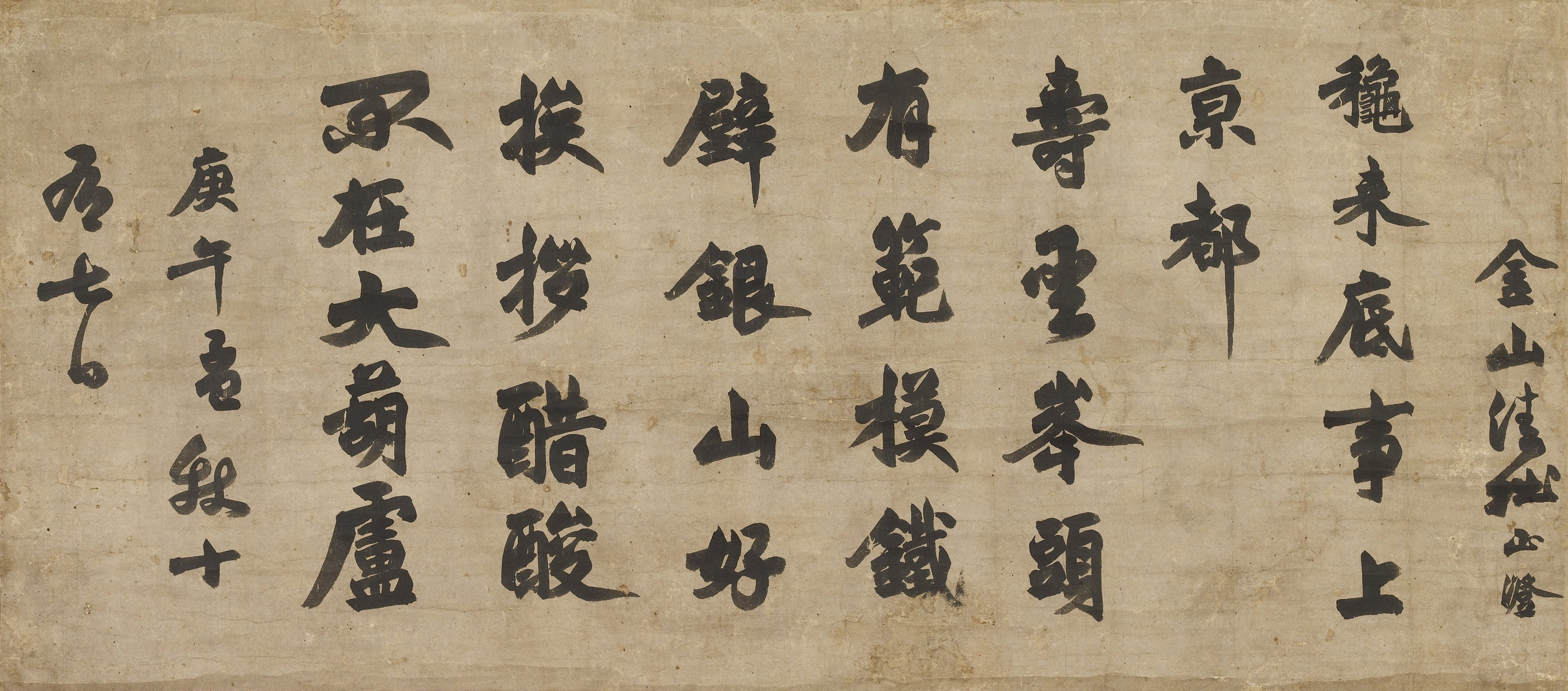
Seisetsu Shocho Bokuseki (Nomura Art Museum)

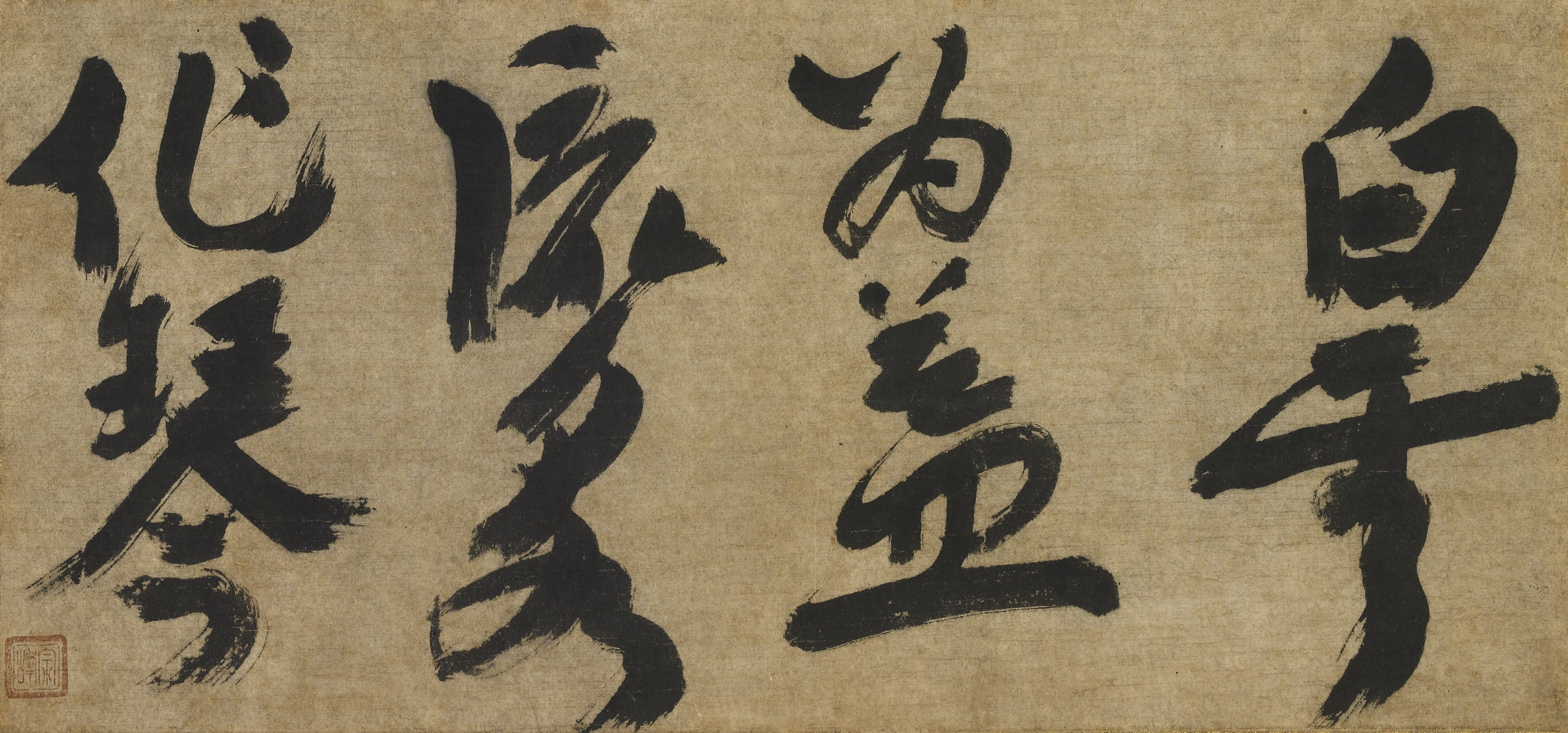
Shuho Myocho Bokuseki (Nomura Art Museum)

== See also ==
- Japanese calligraphy
  - Zenga
  - Hitsuzendō
