= Hitsuzendō =

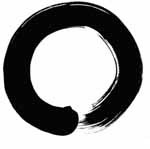
Ensō, the Zen circle

Hitsuzendō (筆禅道, "way of Zen through brush") is believed by Zen Buddhists to be a method of achieving samādhi (Japanese: 三昧 sanmai), which is unification of the mind in meditative absorption (Jhāna, Chan, Zen). Hitsuzendo refers specifically to a school of Japanese Zen calligraphy to which the rating system of modern calligraphy (well-proportioned and pleasing to the eye) is foreign. Instead, the calligraphy of Hitsuzendo must breathe with the vitality of eternal experience.

== Origins ==
Yokoyama Tenkei (1885–1966), inspired by the teachings of Yamaoka Tesshu (1836–1888), founded the Hitsuzendo line of thought as a "practice to uncover one's original self through the brush." This was then further developed by Omori Sogen Roshi as a way of Zen practice. Hitsuzendo is practised standing, using a large brush and ink, usually on a newspaper roll. In this way, the whole body is used to guide the brush, in contrast to writing at a table.

== History ==
Calligraphy was brought to Japan from China and Chinese masters such as Wang Xizhi 王羲之 (Jp: Ou Gishi; 303-361) have had a profound influence, especially on the karayō style which is still practiced today. The indigenous Japanese wayō tradition (和様書道, wayō-shodō) only appeared towards the end of the Heian era. However, the calligraphy of Zen scholars was often more concerned with spiritual qualities and individual expression and shunned technicalities which led to unique and distinctly personal styles. Japanese calligraphy has three basic styles: Kaisho 楷書, Gyōsho 行書, and Sōsho 草書, adopted from China.

== Philosophical background ==
Adherents to the practise espouse that true creation must arise from mu-shin 無心, the state of "no-mind," in which thought, emotions, and expectations do not matter. According to practitioners, truly skillful Zen calligraphy is not the product of intense "practice;" rather, it is best achieved as the product of the "no-mind" state, a high level of spirituality, and a heart free of disturbances.

Zen calligraphic characters are intended to convey deep meaning, the calligrapher must focus intensely, becoming one with the creation. This is the philosophy behind Zen Calligraphy and other Japanese arts.

== See also ==
- Zenga
- Bokuseki
