= Arado cattle =

Type of cattle

Arado
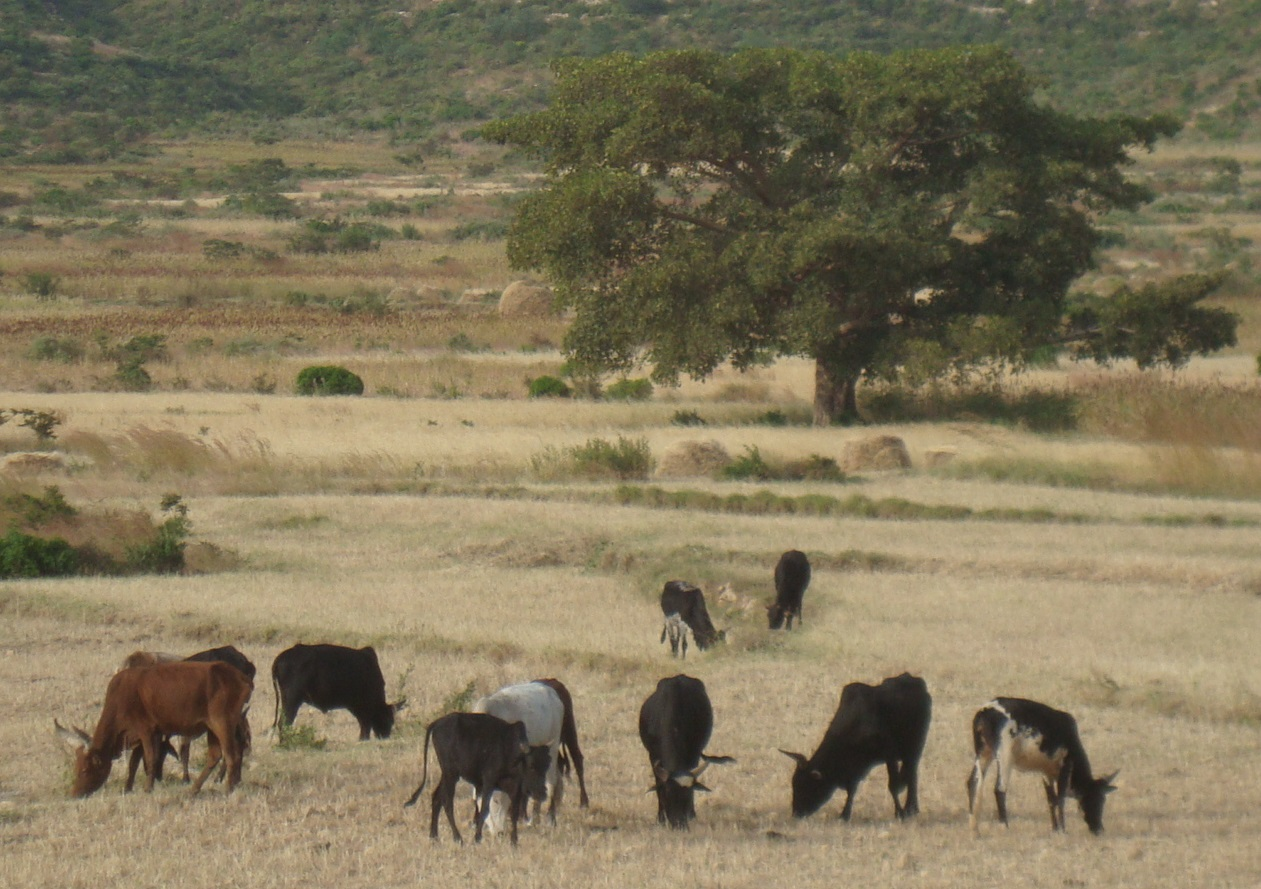
- Arado cattle in aftermath grazing in Dogu'a Tembien
- Country of origin: Ethiopia
- Distribution: north Ethiopian highlands
- Use: Draught, meat, milk (in that order)

Traits
- Weight: Male: 240–270 kilograms (530–600 lb); Female: 180–220 kilograms (400–490 lb)
- Coat: red, black, stained
- Horn status: medium
- Cattle; Bos (primigenius) indicus

The red and black coated Arado cattle are small and hardy. They are the most common cattle variety in the north Ethiopian highlands. The Arado breed is part of the Zenga breed group. It is essentially reared for draught power, particularly tillage. The breed feeds mainly on crop residues; it is adapted to seasonal feed shortages. This breed is often cross-bred through bull and artificial insemination services.

== Physical characteristics ==
The Arado cattle have red and black coats. Bulls and oxen have thick and short horns and a cervicothoracic hump; cows have medium, thin horns. Oxen weigh 254 kg and cows 201 kg on average. The average height at withers of 120 and 115 cm.

== Closely related types ==
- Abergele cattle
- Begayt cattle
- Fogera cattle

== Origin of the cattle breed ==
Ethiopia has been at a crossroads for cattle immigration to Africa due to

- proximity to the geographical entry of Indian and Arabian zebu
- proximity to Near-Eastern and European taurine
- introgression with West African taurine due to pastoralism

Furthermore, the diverse agro-ecology led to diverse farming systems which, in turn, made Ethiopia a centre of secondary diversification for livestock :

- The Sanga cattle originated in Ethiopia. They are a major bovine group in Africa – a cross-breeding of local long-horned taurines and Arabian zebus
- The Arado cattle are part of the Zenga (Zebu-Sanga) breeds, which resulted from a second introduction and crossing with Indian zebu

== Breeding and genetic resource management ==
Mating takes place on the grazing grounds, or the cow is brought to a bull in the neighbourhood. Farmers try essentially to improve the Arado breed through crossbreeding with other indigenous breeds. This favours selection for fitness, and the adaptation to broader farming system and environmental conditions.

== Stresses on the cattle breed ==
- socio-political: urbanisation, and civil wars
- panzootic: cattle plague
- environmental: destruction of ecosystems and droughts
