= Marusankakushikaku =

Artwork by Sengai

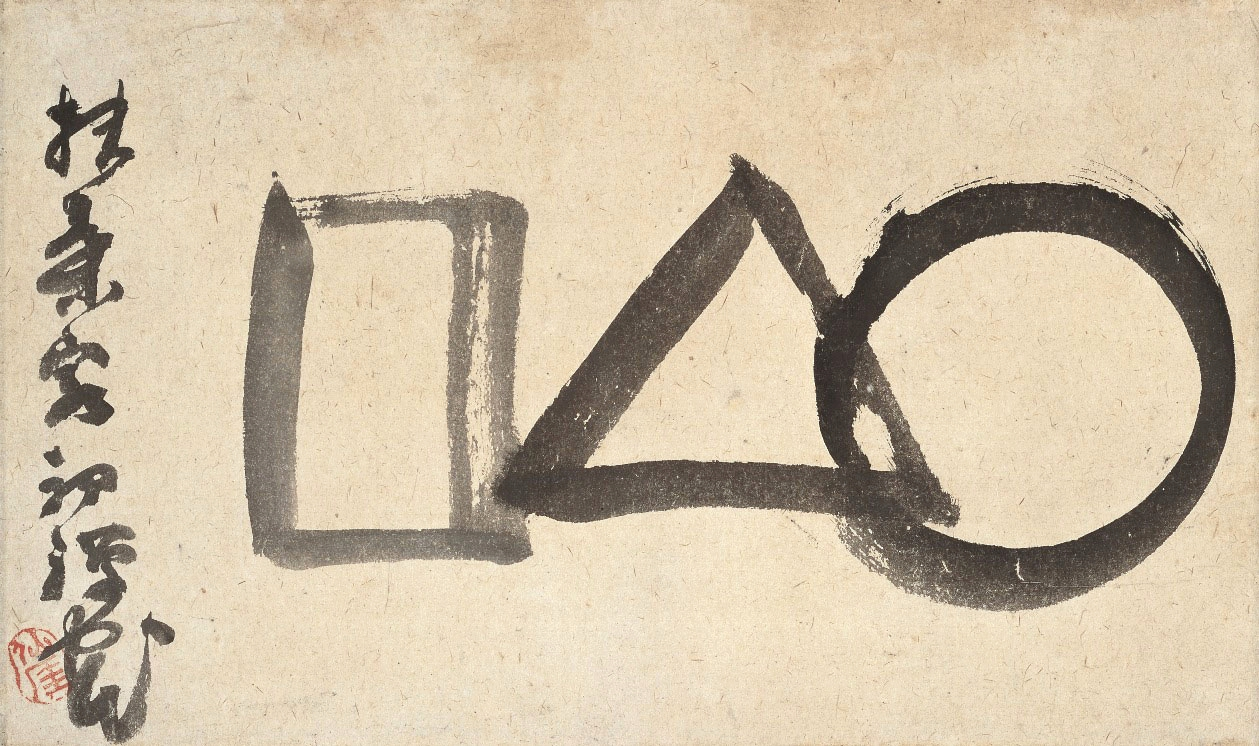
- Artist: Sengai
- Year: c. 1819–1828
- Medium: Ink on washi paper
- Movement: Zenga
- Dimensions: 28.4 cm × 48.1 cm (11.2 in × 18.9 in)
- Location: Idemitsu Museum of Arts, Tokyo

Maru-sankaku-shikaku (Japanese: まるさんかくしかく / 円三角四角; lit. 'circle, triangle, square'), also known as ○△□, or in English as The Universe, is a zenga by Sengai, a Japanese monk and artist, thought to have been made between 1819 and 1828. The work consists of a circle, a triangle and a square drawn in ink on paper, and has been called the "most mysterious work left by Sengai" due to its simplicity and ambiguity. It hangs in the Idemitsu Museum of Arts in Tokyo.

== Description ==
Maru-sankaku-shikaku consists of three simple geometric shapes, drawn freehand in ink on washi paper – from right to left, a circle (円, maru), a triangle (三角, sankaku), and a square (四角, shikaku). The circle is drawn in the darkest ink, and the square in the lightest ink. The work is 28.4 cm (11.2 in) tall and 48.1 cm (18.9 in) wide.

On the left edge of the work is Sengai's rakkan (sign and seal) and the inscribed phrase Fusō saisho zenkutsu (扶桑最初禅窟; 'Japan's first Zen temple'), referring to Shōfuku-ji in Hakata, where Sengai was the chief priest. Sengai's works are typically accompanied by a eulogy, which is important in interpreting them, but Maru-sankaku-shikaku lacks one.

As Maru-sankaku-shikaku bears a stamp known to be used by Sengai in his 70s, it is estimated to have been made between 1819 and 1828. It hangs in the Idemitsu Museum of Arts in Tokyo.

== Title ==
The work is usually titled "○△□", with the shapes ordered from right to left, as the rakkan is on the left of the work. However, as it is thought that the shapes were drawn from left to right due to the darkness of the ink, "□△○" has been proposed as an alternative title.

In his analysis of the work, D. T. Suzuki gave it the English title "The Universe", interpreting its subject as Sengai's view of space.

== Analysis ==
Maru-sankaku-shikaku has been called "a unique and representative work of Sengai without any other example", composed only of simple geometric shapes. Due to its lack of a eulogy, atypical of Sengai's works, it is also described as Sengai's most difficult and mysterious work.

Suzuki described the work as representing the universe drawn by Sengai, with the circle standing for the "infinite", the triangle for the "start of all things", and the square for two triangles, meaning that the process continues indefinitely, resulting in countless events.

== Bibliography ==
- Suzuki, Daisetsu (19 March 2004). 仙厓の書画 [Works of Sengai] (in Japanese). Iwanami Shoten, Publishers. ISBN 9784000236423.
- Yashima, Shin (1 March 2015). 仙厓の禅画―ユーモアに包まれたメッセージ [Zengas of Sengai:messages coated in humor] (in Japanese). 竹林舎. ISBN 9784902084627.
