= Ensō =

Japanese motif

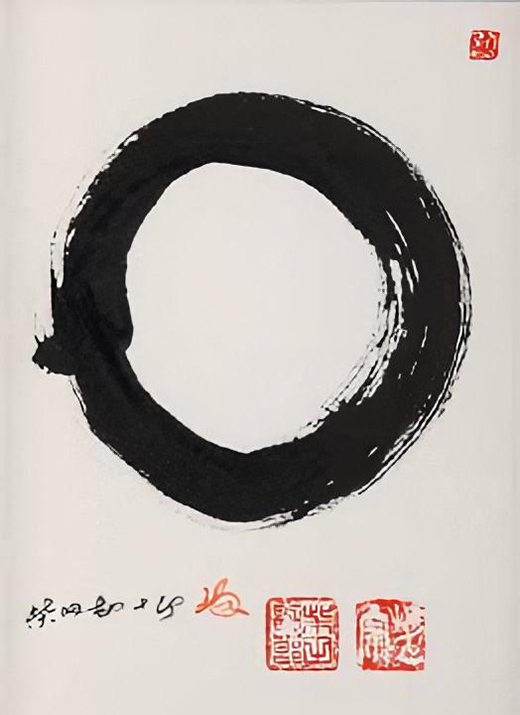
Ensō (c. 2000) by Kanjuro Shibata XX. Some artists draw ensō with an opening in the circle, while others close the circle.

In Zen art, an ensō (円相; "circular form") is a circle hand-drawn in one or two uninhibited brushstrokes to express the Zen mind, which is associated with enlightenment, emptiness, freedom, and the state of no-mind.

== Description ==
The ensō symbolizes absolute enlightenment, strength, elegance, the universe (Dharmadhatu), and mu (emptiness). It is characterised by a minimalism influenced by Zen Buddhist philosophy, and Japanese aesthetics. An empty circle also appears in the ten oxherding pictures which is a set of illustrations that depict Zen training.

Drawing ensō is a disciplined-creative practice of Japanese ink painting, sumi-e. The tools and mechanics of drawing the ensō are the same as those used in traditional Japanese calligraphy: One uses an ink brush to apply ink to washi (a thin Japanese paper).

The circle may be open or closed. In the former case, the circle is incomplete, allowing for movement and development and the perfection of all things. Zen practitioners relate the idea to wabi-sabi, the beauty of imperfection. The space inside the circle may represent the state of the realization of emptiness (shunyata) or no-mind.

Usually, a person draws the ensō in one fluid, expressive stroke. When drawn according to the sōsho (cursive) style of Japanese calligraphy, the brushstroke is especially swift. Once the ensō is drawn, one does not change it. It evidences the character of its creator and the context of its creation in a brief, continuous period. Drawing ensō is a spiritual practice that one might perform as often as once per day.

This spiritual practice of drawing ensō or writing Japanese calligraphy for self-realization is called hitsuzendō. Ensō exemplifies the various dimensions of the Japanese wabi-sabi perspective and aesthetic: fukinsei (asymmetry, irregularity), kanso (simplicity), koko (basic; weathered), shizen (without pretense; natural), yugen (subtly profound grace), datsuzoku (freedom), and seijaku (tranquility).

== See also ==
- Abstract expressionism, a 20th-century American art movement
- Buddhism in Japan
- Dhyāna in Buddhism, a meditation practice in which the observer detaches from several qualities of the mind
- Ink wash painting, an East Asian style of brush painting that uses black ink
- Ouroboros, an ancient symbol depicting a serpent or dragon eating its tail
- Wuji
- Marusankakushikaku
- Heptapod B
