= Sengai =

Japanese artist (1750–1837)

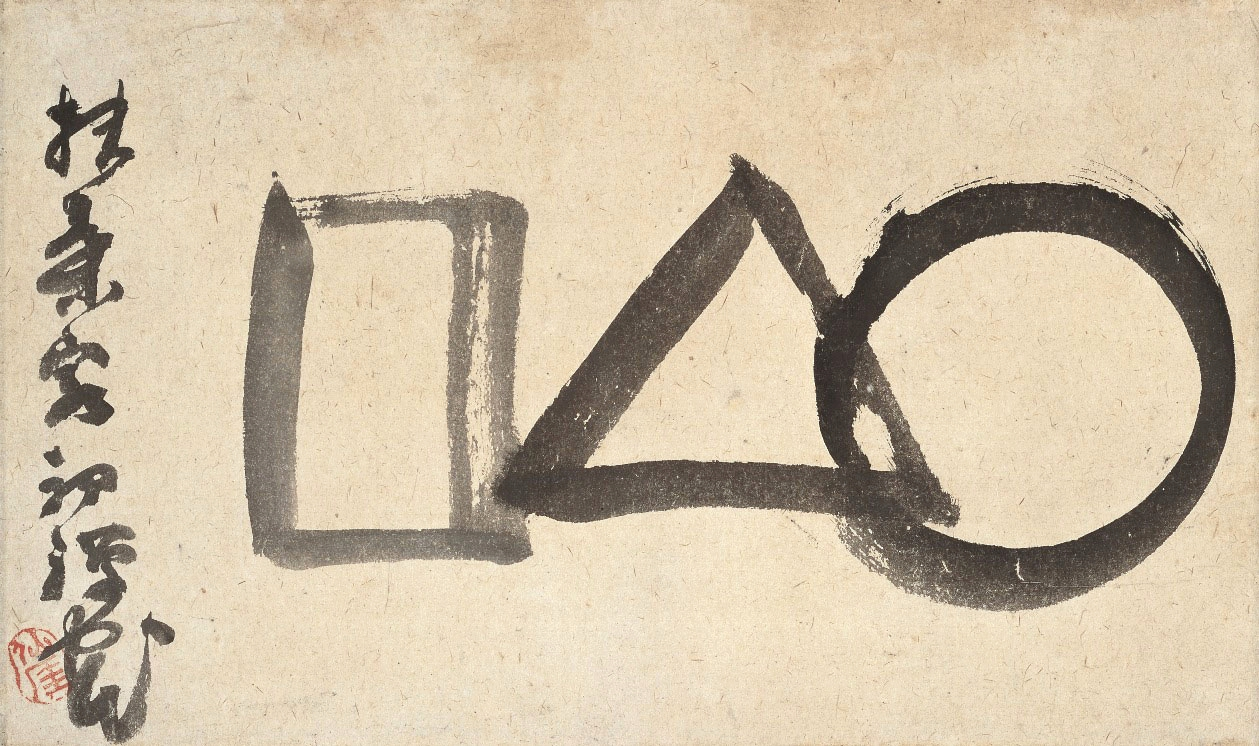
○△□ or Marusankakushikaku or The Universe

Sengai Gibon (仙厓 義梵, 1750–1837) was a Japanese monk of the Rinzai school (one of three main schools of Zen Buddhism in Japan, the others being the Sōtō school and the much smaller Ōbaku school). He was known for his controversial teachings and writings, as well as for his lighthearted sumi-e paintings. After spending half of his life in Nagata near Yokohama, he secluded himself in Shōfuku-ji in Fukuoka, the first Zen temple in Japan, where he spent the rest of his life.

Though the Rinzai sect is particularly known for its hard-to-understand teachings, Sengai tried to make them accessible to the public.

== Works ==
One of his most notable paintings depicts a circle, a square and a triangle. Sengai left the painting without a title or inscription, save for his signature. The painting is often called Marusankakushikaku, written as "○△□", or "The Universe" when referred to in English.

My play with brush and ink is not calligraphy nor painting; yet unknowing people mistakenly think: this is calligraphy, this is painting.

— Sengai Gibon

== Gallery ==
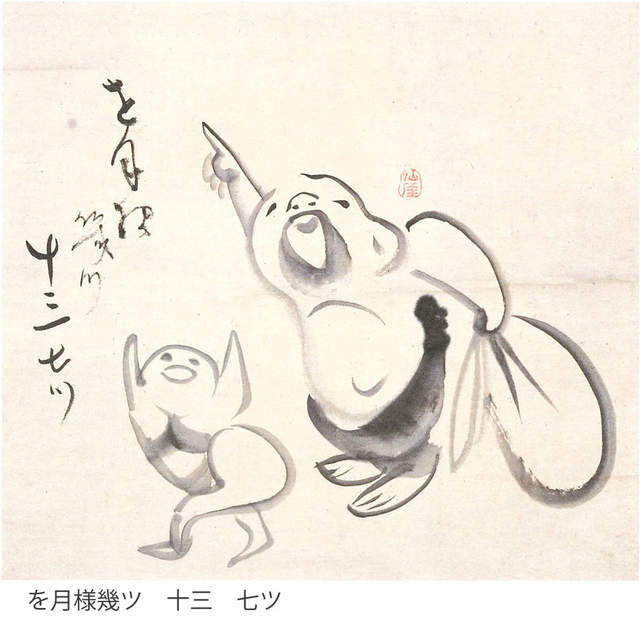
Praise to Hotei Pointing to the Moon

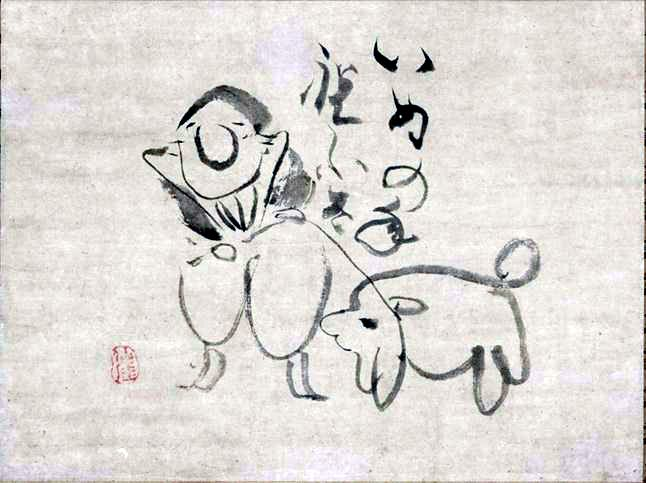
Year of the Dog Celebration

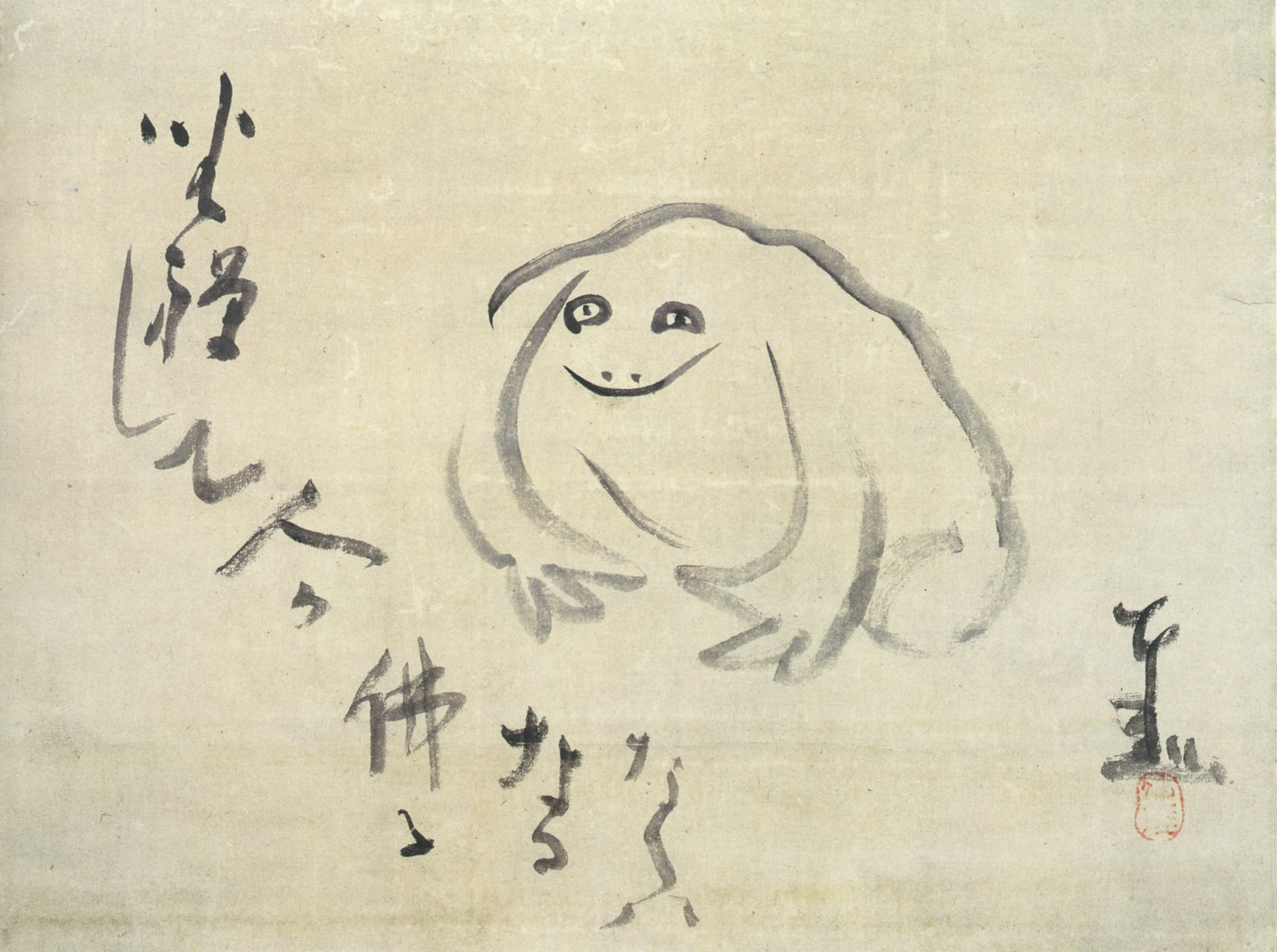

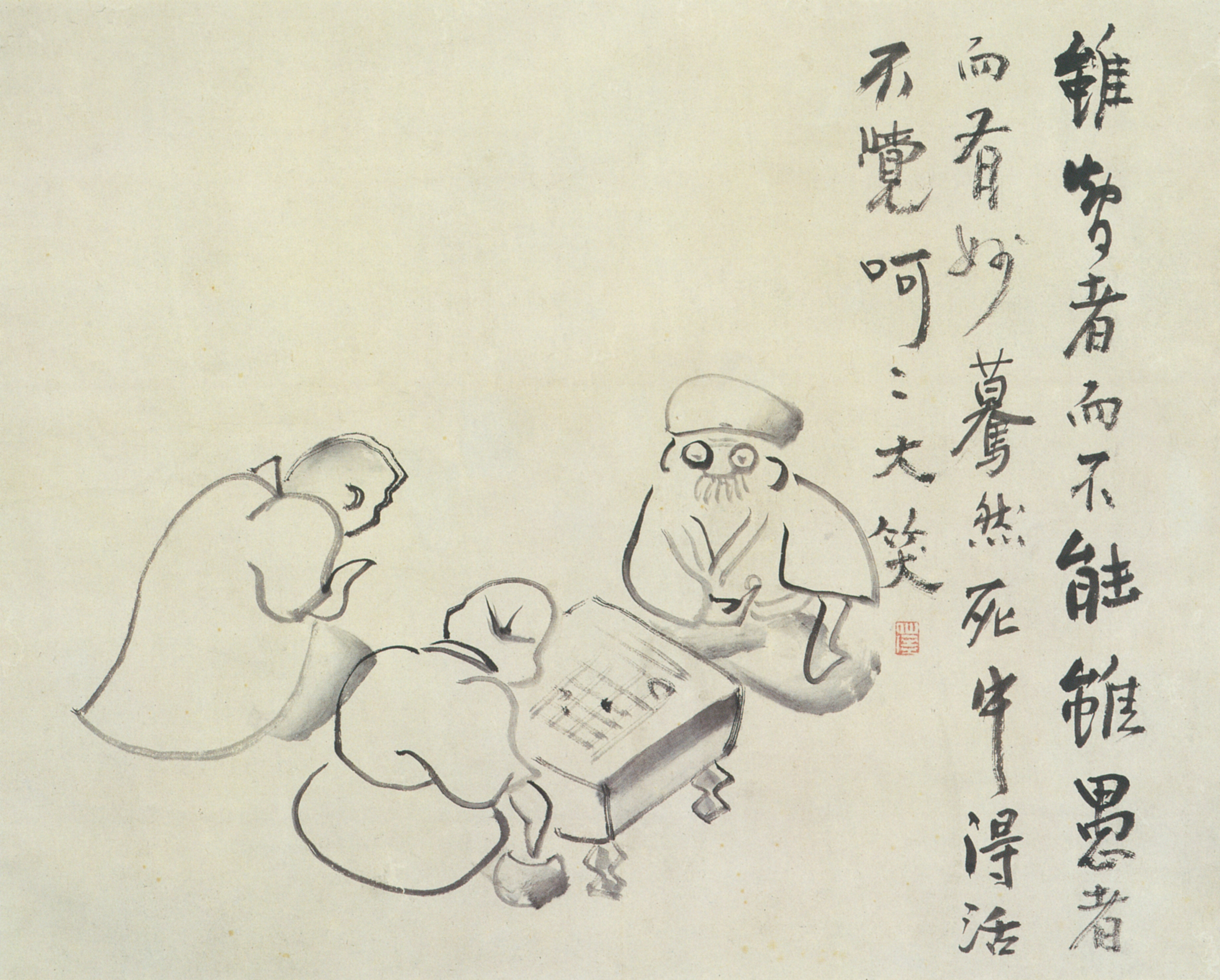

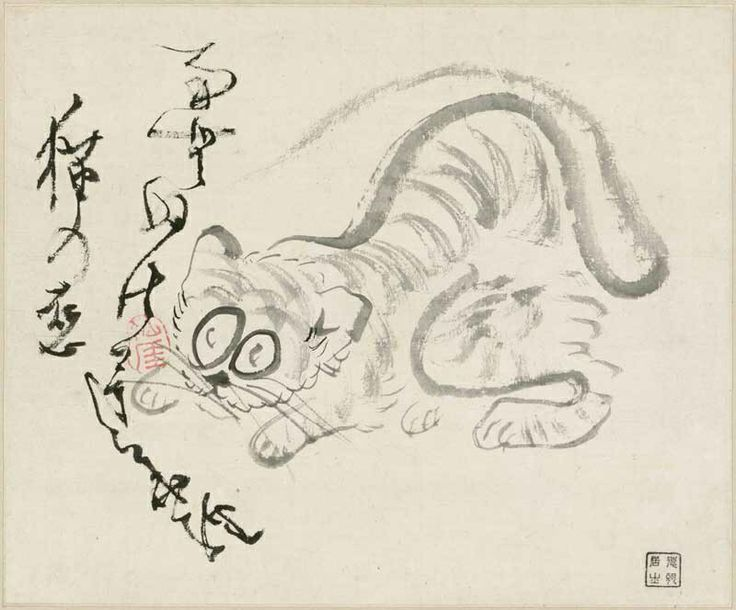

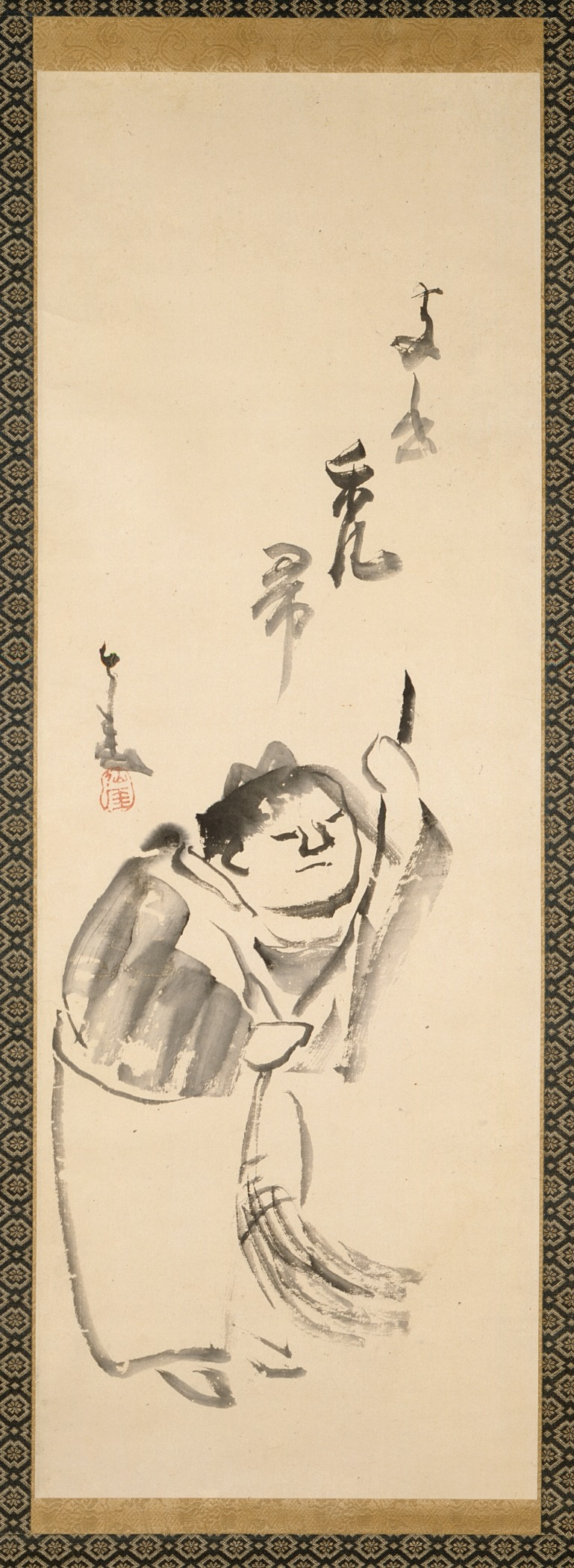

== See also ==
- Buddhism in Japan
- List of Rinzai Buddhists
