= Zenga =

Zen Buddhist art

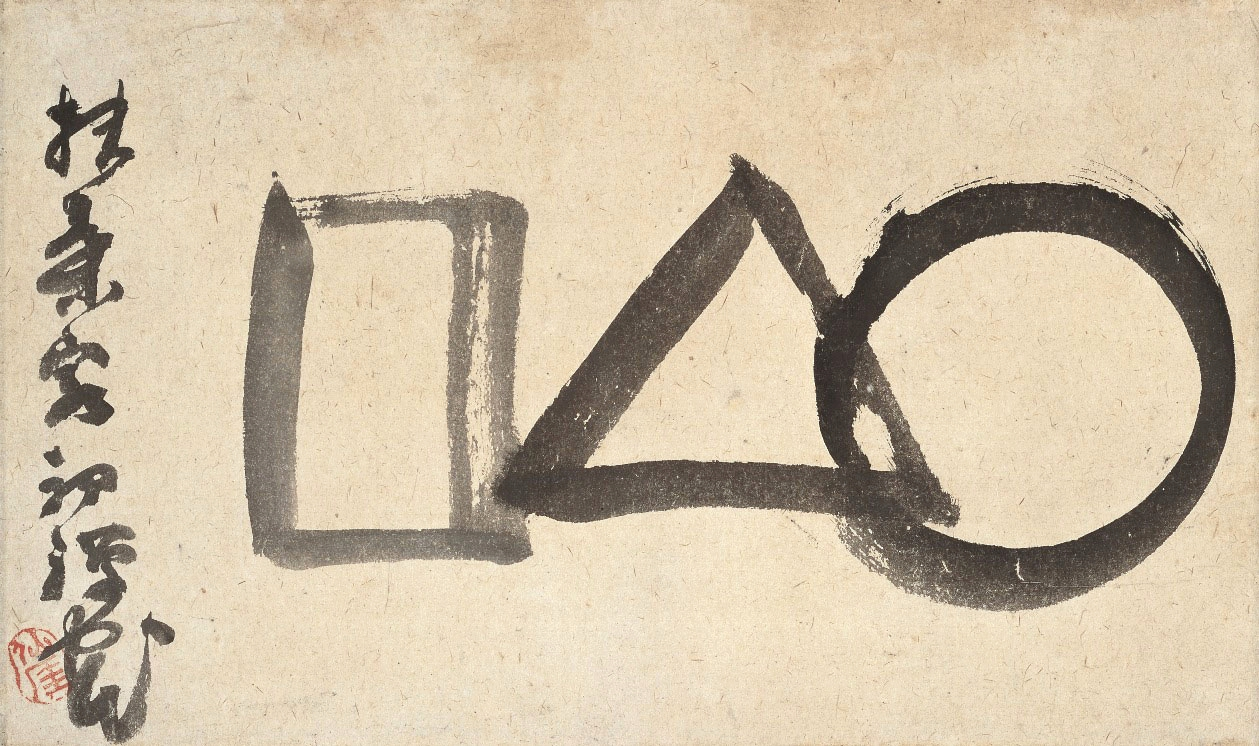
Marusankakushikaku, a famous zenga by Sengai

Zenga (禅画; "zen picture") is a subset of Zen painting that encompasses the sumi-e painting and calligraphy of Japanese Zen Masters during the Edo period and Meiji period. It is characterized by direct, simple, and expressive brush work, usually in monochrome. Zenga paintings featured traditional Buddhist figures such as Daruma, Kanzan and Jittoko, and Hotei, often depicted in comical caricatures. Zen sayings, also brushed in rough calligraphy, accompanied the paintings. Simple motifs such as the Ensō, the Zen Masters staff or calligraphy without painting were also popular themes in Zenga.

The term "Zenga" (the Japanese pronunciation of “Zen painting”) was introduced by Japanese-born Swiss scholar Kurt Brasch's books Hakuin and Zenga (1957) and Zenga (1962), as well as the traveling Zenga exhibition he organized in Europe from 1959 to 1960. These postwar Zenga exhibitions were particularly influential. Brasch's use of the term "Zenga," however, prompted criticism from some Japanese scholars including Takeuchi Naoji, who argued that it narrowly categorized the art.

Zenga is sometimes contrasted with "nanga," or "literati painting," made by scholars.

== Style ==
In many instances, both calligraphy and image will be in the same piece. The calligraphy denotes a poem, or saying, that teaches some element of the true path of Zen. These inscriptions are usually short, often written in kana. The brush painting is characteristically simple, bold and abstract, and the style often playful and spontaneous.

== Zen painting during the Edo period ==
The Edo period saw a new popularization of Zen. During the Edo period Zenga was not confined to the spiritual and educational discipline within the monastic Zen community but became one of several forms of Zen Buddhist outreach into the lay community. With the ushering in of the Tokugawa shogunate, “Religion came to penetrate the lives of the general populace, not just as a primitive faith, but also as a system of beliefs, that had undergone considerable intellectual refinement while sustained by the teachings and rituals of Buddhism and Shinto.

== Practitioners ==
=== Sengai Gibon ===
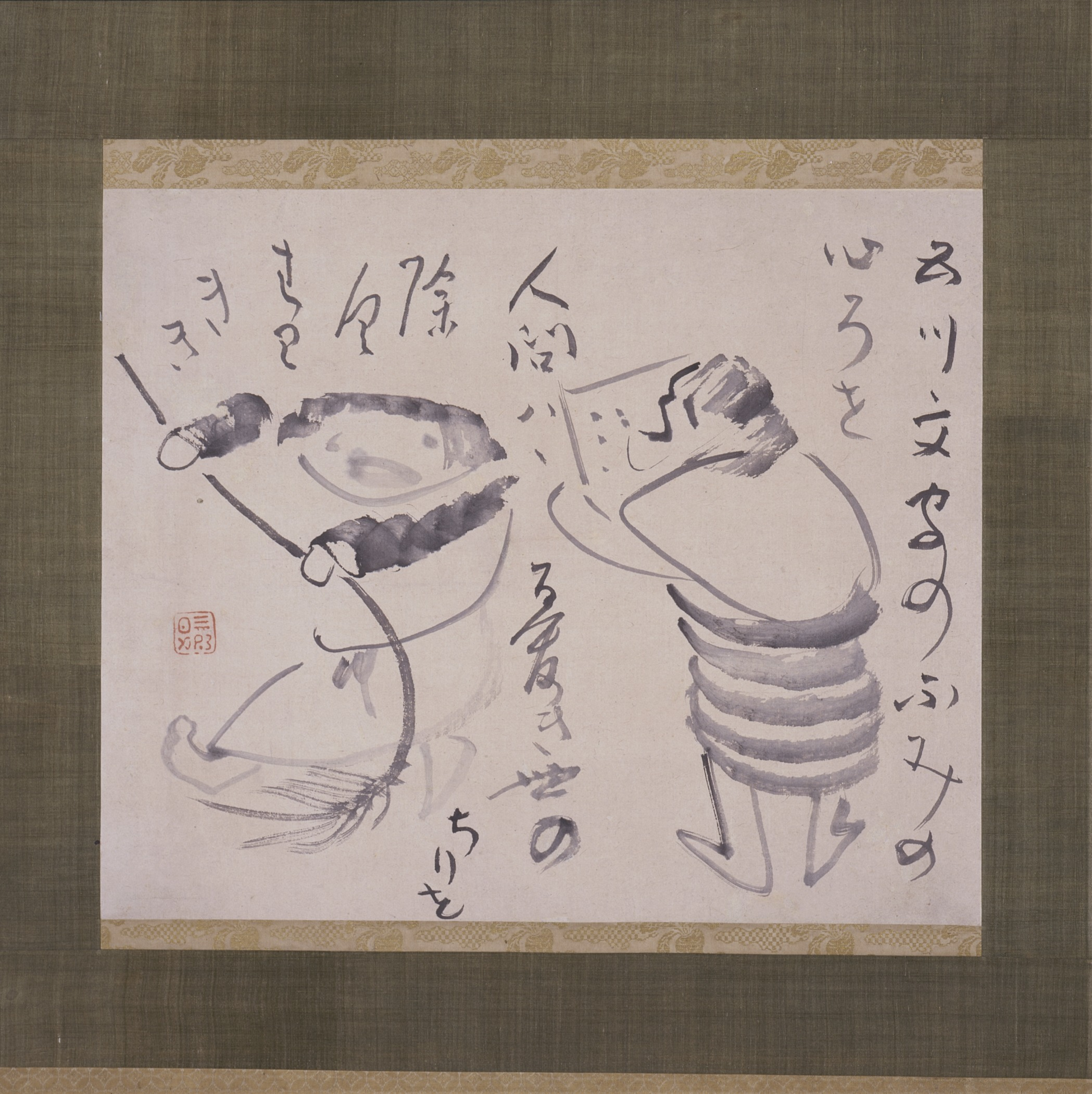
Sengai Gibon, Kanzan and Jittoku, Jittoku, with the broom, is deconstructed, by quick direct brushwork, to just arms, face and broom.

Sengai Gibon (1750-1837) was another notable Zenga monk/artist. He was the abbot of the Shōfuku-ji temple in Hakata, Japan, retiring in 1811. Like Hakuin, most of his ink painting was done in the later years of his life. Sengai is known for his roughly-brushed, comical style of painting.

=== Hakuin Ekaku ===
Hakuin Ekaku, (1685-1768) was a Zen Master of the Rinzai sect and abbot of the Shōin-ji temple in Hara, Japan. Hakuin is considered one of the foremost artists in the Zenga oeuvre. He took up brush painting when in his 60's and produced thousands of works up to the end of his life.

== Gallery ==
The Zenga Enso
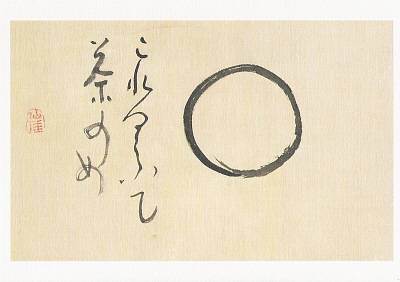
Sengai Gibon (1750-1837)

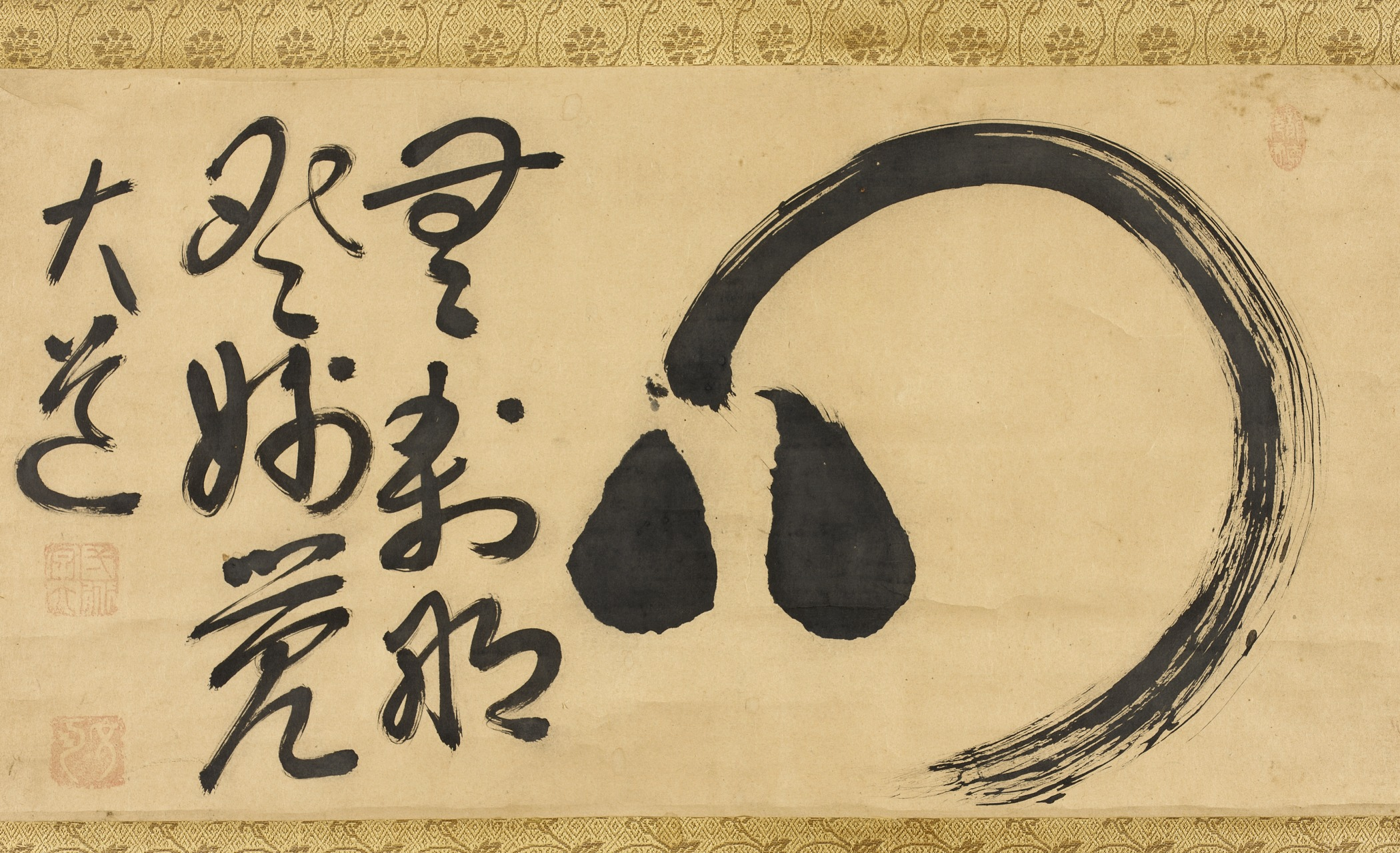
The Character for Heart-Mind as an Enso - Daidō Bunka (Japan, 1680-1752)

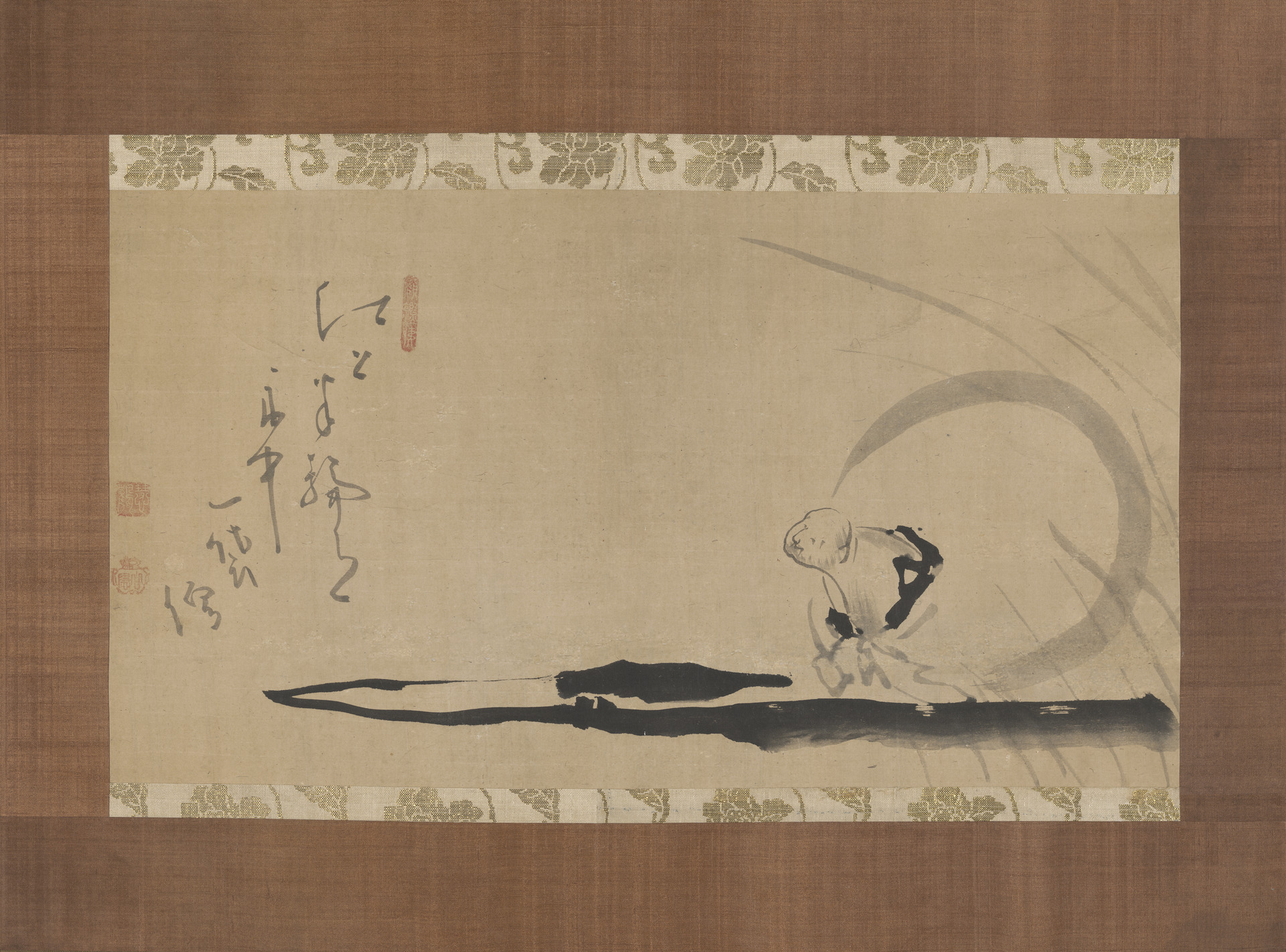
Hakuin Ekaku (1685-1768), Hotei in a Boat, Hakuin brushes the famous bag of Hotei as a modified enso in grey wash. The boat is represented as a back and forth, one-stroke brush.

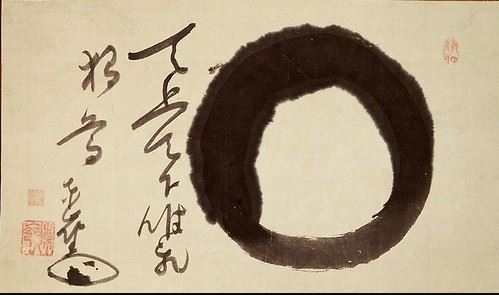
Torei Enji (1721-1792)

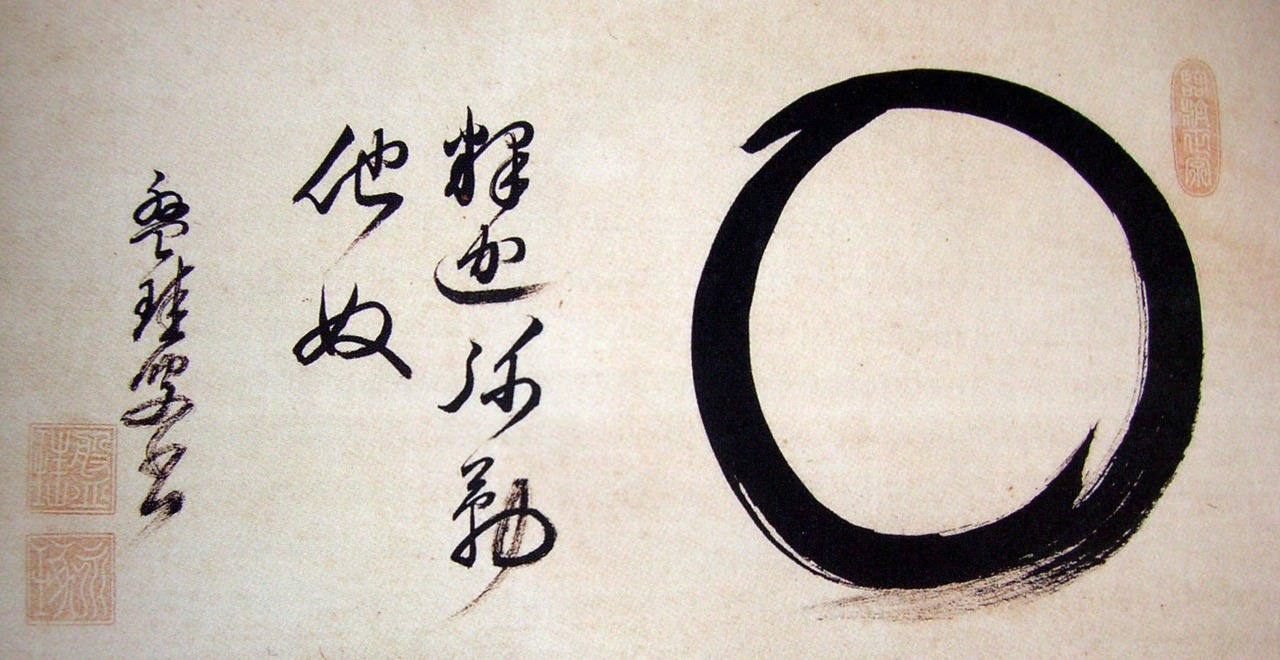
Bankei Yōtaku (盤珪永琢; 1622-1693)
The Zenga Daruma
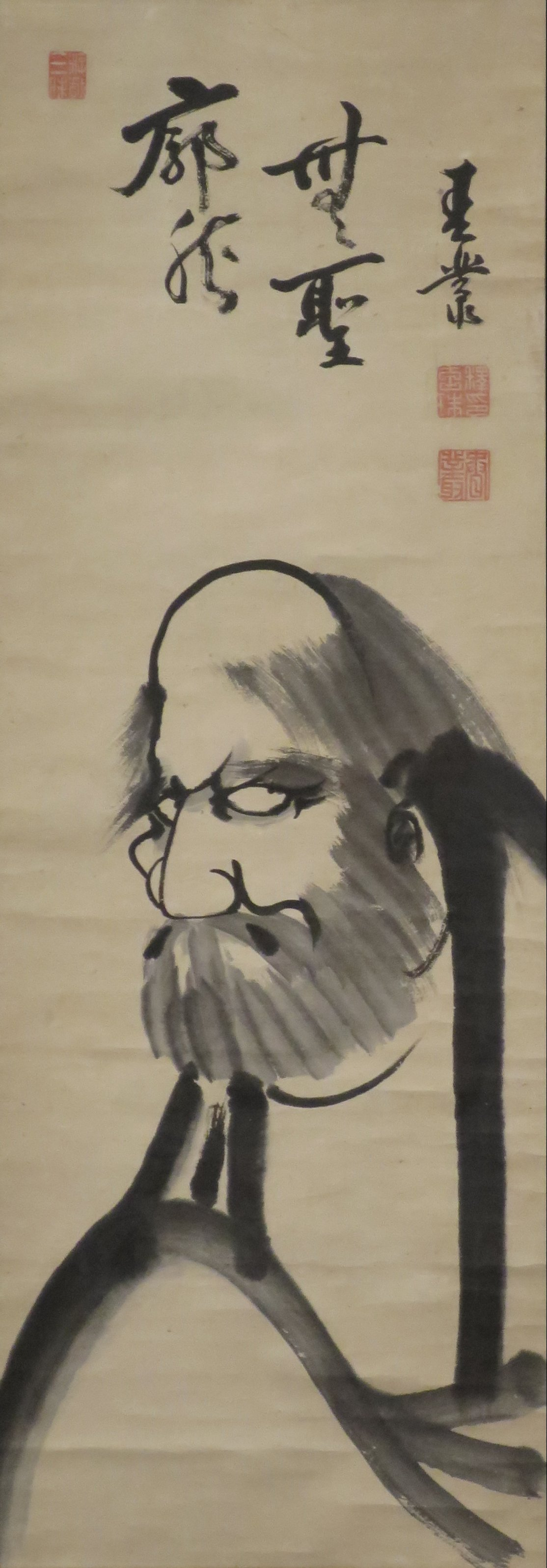
Shunsō Shōshu (1752-1835)

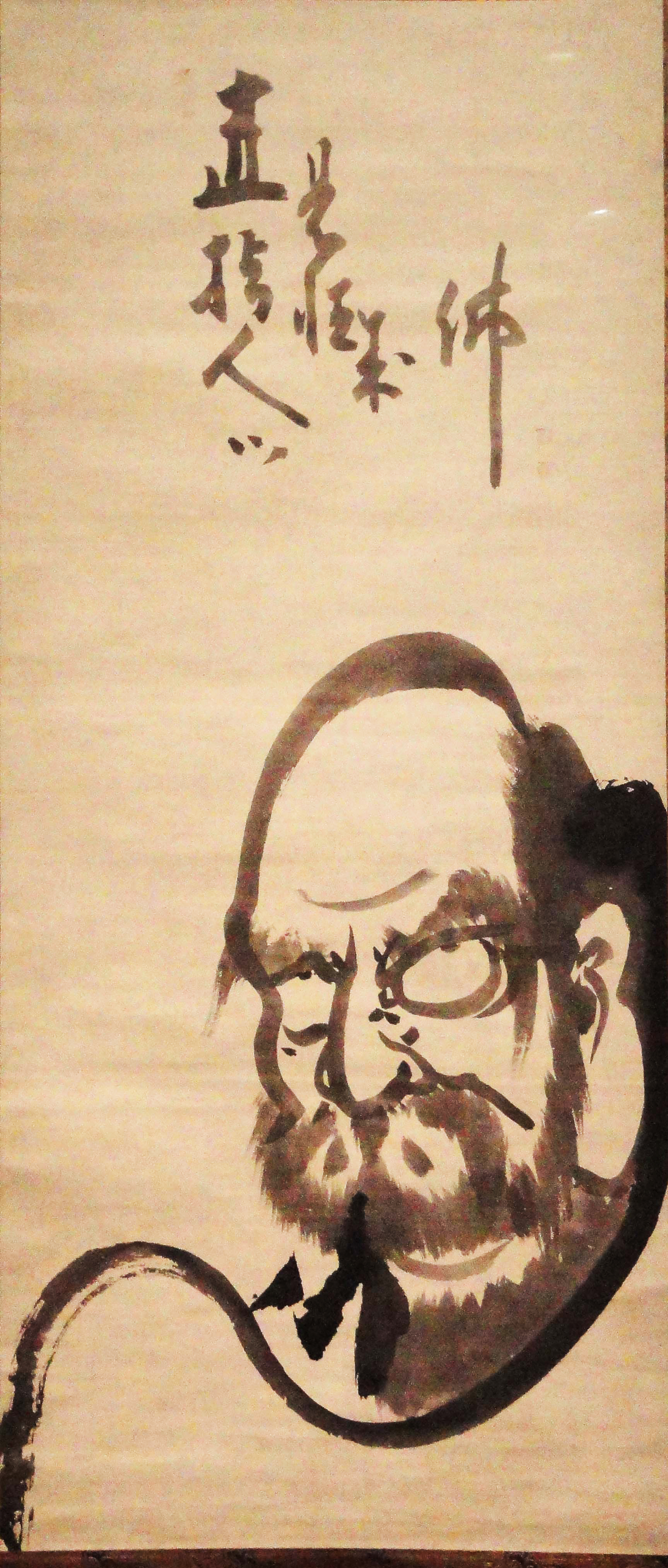
Hakuin Ekaku (白隠 慧鶴, 1685-1768)

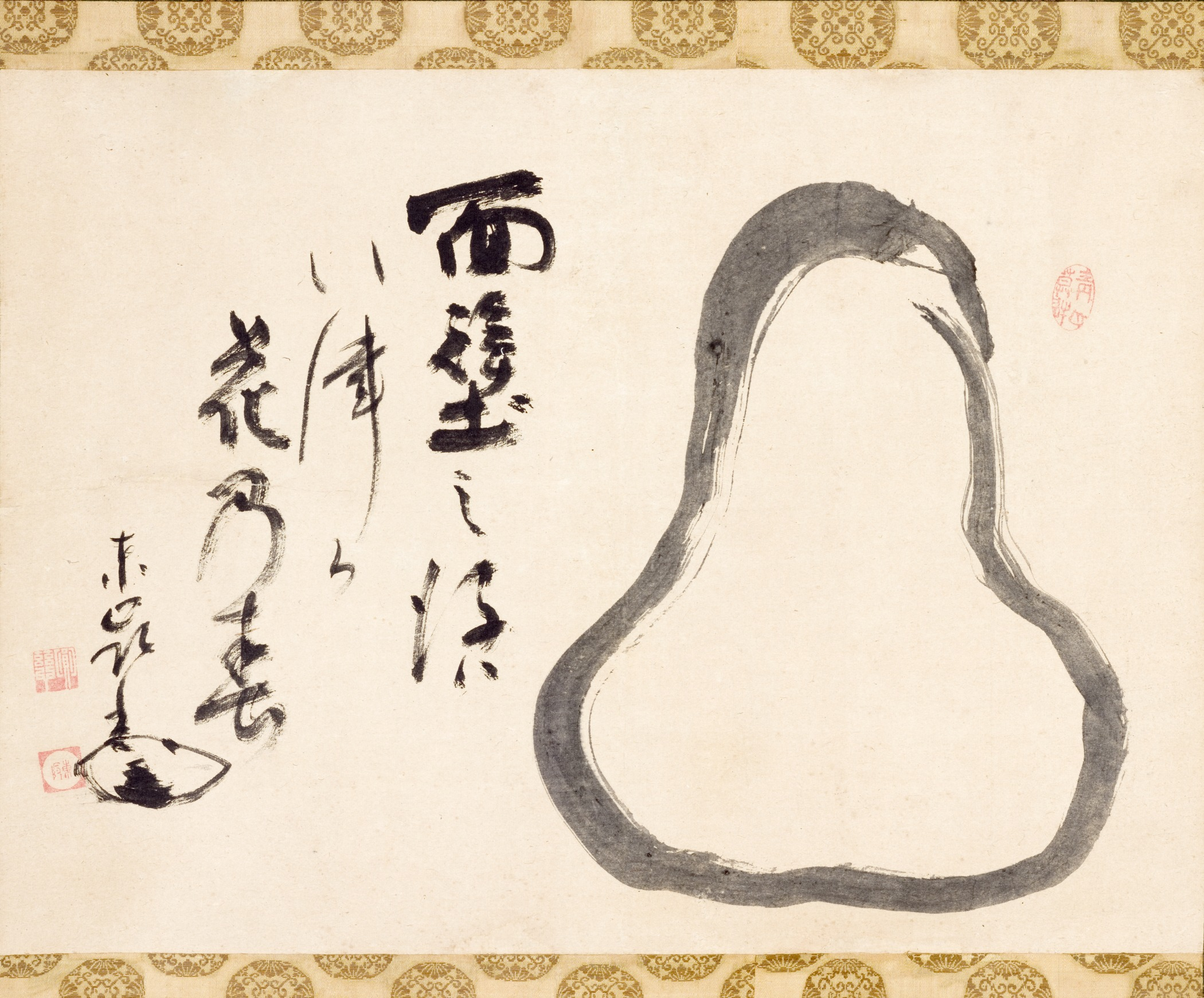
Tōrei Enji (Japan, 1721-1792

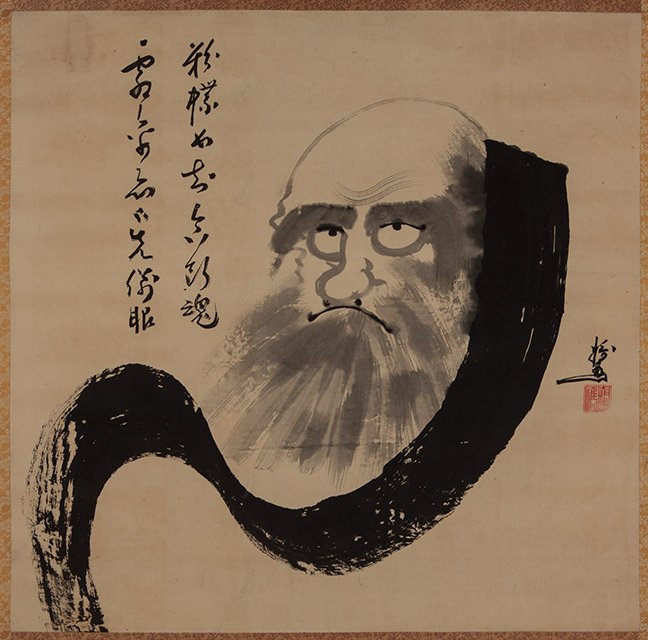
Setsuo 19th century

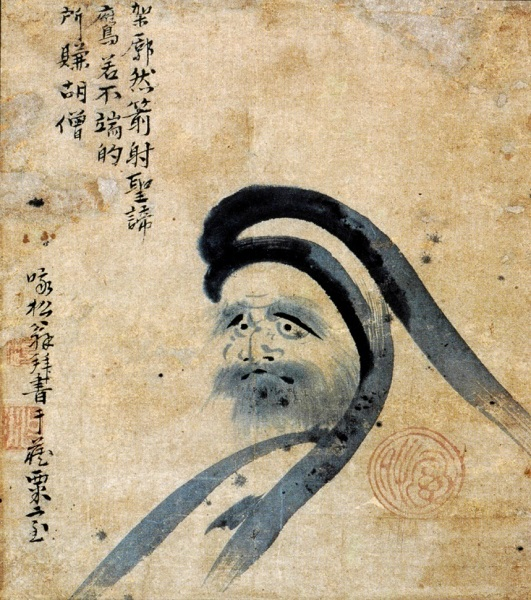
Fūgai Ekun (1568-1650)

== See also ==
- Otsu-e
- Haiga
- Nanga
- Chinese ink and brush painting
- Chan Buddhism
- Japanese calligraphy
  - Hitsuzendō
  - Bokuseki
