= Agefet =

River in the Tembien highlands of Ethiopia

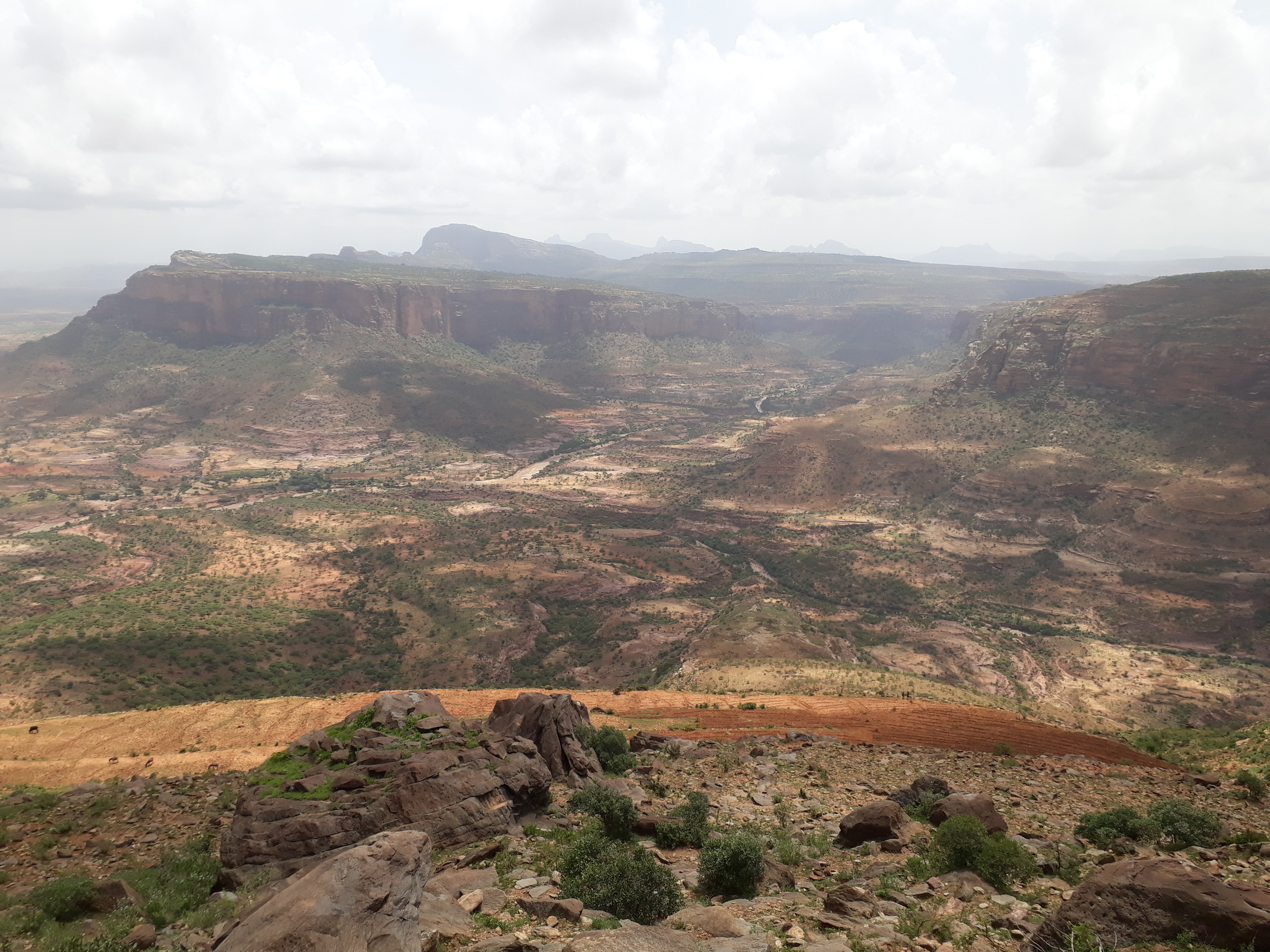
- The Agefet River at Hazgi

- Agefet River in Dogu’a Tembien

Location
- Country: Ethiopia
- Region: Tigray Region
- District (woreda): Dogu’a Tembien

Physical characteristics
- Source: Gheralta
  - location: 8 km east of Tsigereda
  - elevation: 2,135 m (7,005 ft)
- Mouth: Tsaliet River
  - location: between Addeha and Gelebeda
  - coordinates: 13.8020°N 39.1156°E
  - elevation: 1,604 m (5,262 ft)
- Length: 41 km (25 mi)
- Width
  - average: 55 m (180 ft)

Basin features
- Progression: Tsaliet→Wari→Tekezé→Atbarah→ Nile→Mediterranean Sea
- River system: Seasonal/permanent river
- Landmarks: Kayeh Be’ati caves in Addi Nkrti
- Tributaries
  - left: Amblo, Azef River, Ab'aro
- Waterbodies: Ginda'i reservoir
- Bridges: on the Werqamba-Hawzien road; on the Tsigereda-Wukro road
- Topography: Mountains and deep gorges

The Agefet is a river of the Nile basin. Rising in the mountains of Gheralta in northern Ethiopia, it flows westward to empty finally in the Weri’i which itself discharges into Tekezé River.

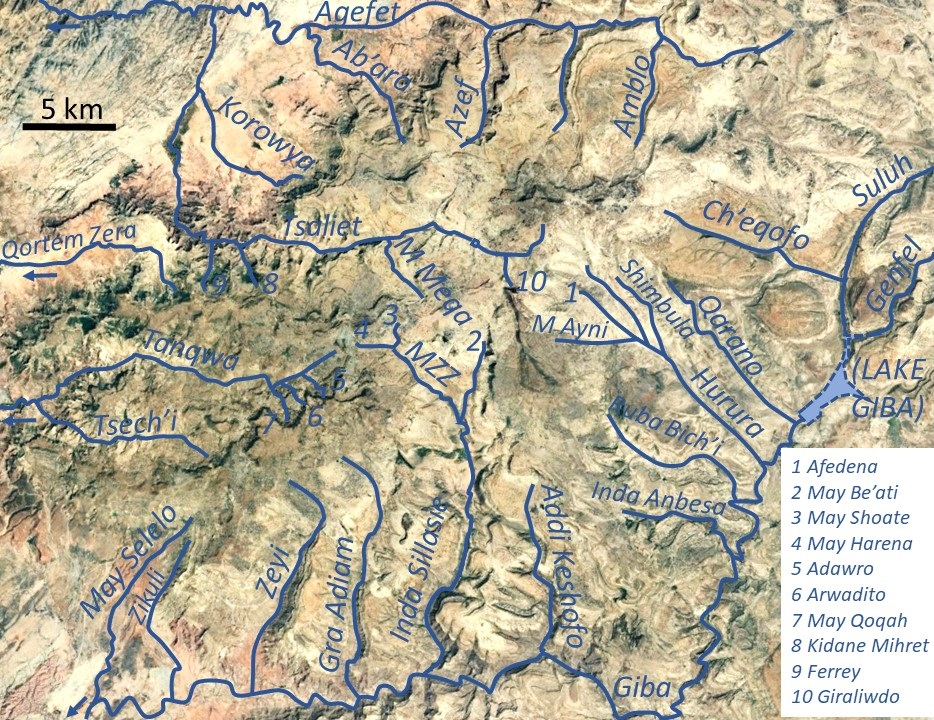
The river in the radial drainage network of Dogu’a Tembien

== Characteristics ==
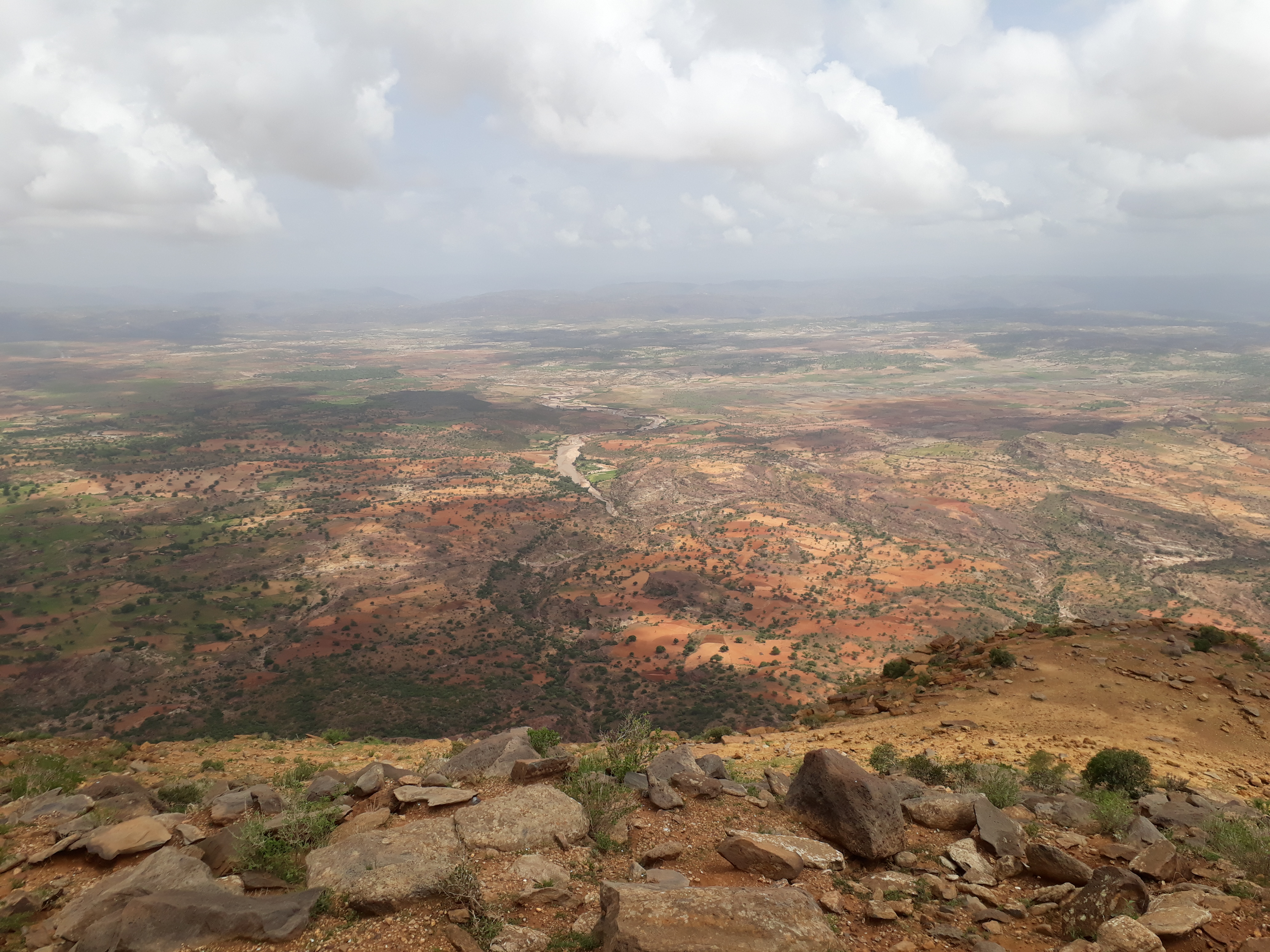
Downstream course of Agefet

The Agefet is a confined ephemeral river, locally meandering in its narrow alluvial plain, with an average slope gradient of 13 metres per kilometre. At the end of its course, it occupies a sandy pediment.

== Flash floods and flood buffering ==
Runoff mostly happens in the form of high runoff discharge events that occur in a very short period (called flash floods). These are related to the steep topography, often little vegetation cover and intense convective rainfall. The peaks of such flash floods have often a 50 to 100 times larger discharge than the preceding baseflow. The magnitude of floods in this river has however been decreased due to interventions in the catchment. Physical conservation structures such as stone bunds and check dams intercept runoff. On many steep slopes, exclosures have been established; the dense vegetation largely contributes to enhanced infiltration, less flooding, and better baseflow.

== Transhumance towards the gorge ==
Transhumance takes place in the summer rainy season, when the lands near the villages are occupied by crops. Young shepherds will take the village cattle down to the Agefet gorge. The gorges are particularly attractive as a transhumance destination zone, because there is water and good growth of semi-natural vegetation.

== Boulders and pebbles in the river bed ==
From upstream to downstream, the following lithological units occur in the catchment.

- Phonolite plugs
- Upper basalt
- Interbedded lacustrine deposits
- Lower basalt
- Amba Aradam Formation
- Antalo Limestone
- Quaternary freshwater tufa
- Adigrat Sandstone
- Edaga Arbi Glacials

Logically, in the uppermost stretches of the river, only the pebbles and boulders of the upper lithological units will be present in the river bed, whereas more downstream one may find a more comprehensive mix of all lithologies crossed by the river.

== Natural boundary ==
During its course, this river passes through three woredas (Kola Tembien, Dogu’a Tembien and Kilte Awula’ilo) and constitutes the border between the two latter over a dozen of kilometres.

== Trekking along the river ==
Trekking routes have been established across and along this river. The tracks are not marked on the ground but can be followed using downloaded .GPX files.

- Trek Gh1, follows the river in its eastern course
- Trek Gh2, crosses the river in its western course

In the rainy season, flash floods may occur, and it is advised not to follow the river bed. Generally, it is impossible to cross the river in the rainy season.

== See also ==
- List of Ethiopian rivers
