= Ab'aro =

River in the Tembien highlands of Ethiopia

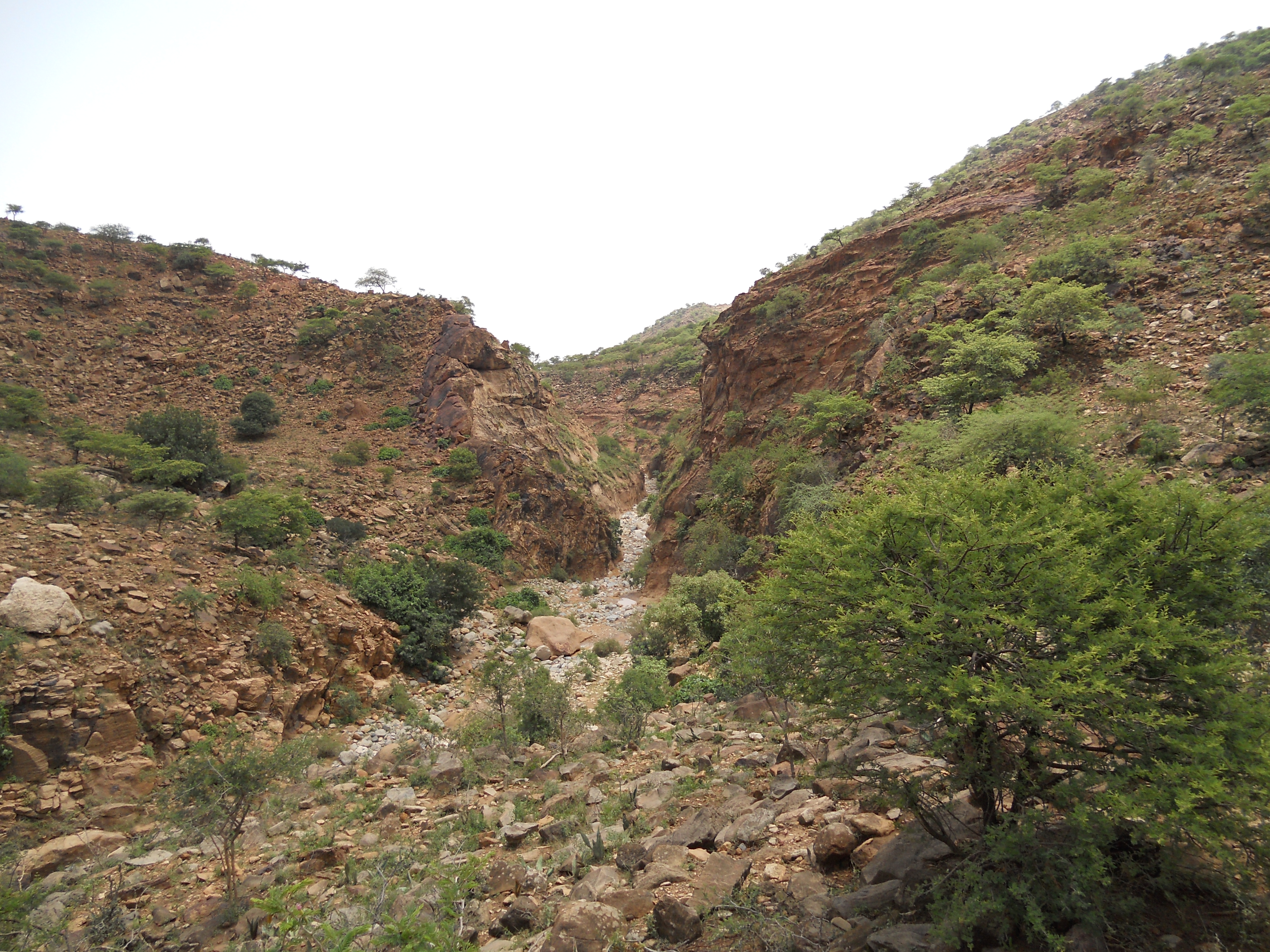
- The Ab’aro cluse cuts across an outcrop of Adigrat Sandstone

- Ab’aro River in Dogu’a Tembien

Location
- Country: Ethiopia
- Region: Tigray Region
- District (woreda): Dogu’a Tembien

Physical characteristics
- Source: Ab’aro rock church
  - location: Atsa in Haddinnet municipality
  - elevation: 2,340 m (7,680 ft)
- Mouth: Agefet River
  - location: NE of Addeha
  - coordinates: 13.7888°N 39.1414°E
  - elevation: 1,638 m (5,374 ft)
- Length: 11.6 km (7.2 mi)
- Width
  - average: 15 m (49 ft)

Basin features
- Progression: Agefet→ Tsaliet→ Wari→ Tekezé→ Atbarah→ Nile→ Mediterranean Sea
- River system: Seasonal river
- Landmarks: Ab’aro rock church, Kayeh Be'ati sandstone caves
- Waterfalls: Rapids in Ab’aro cluse
- Topography: Mountains, deep gorges and a sandy outwash plain

The Ab’aro is a river of the Nile basin. Rising in the mountains of Dogu’a Tembien in northern Ethiopia, it flows northwestward to empty into the Weri’i, which is a tributary of Tekezé River.

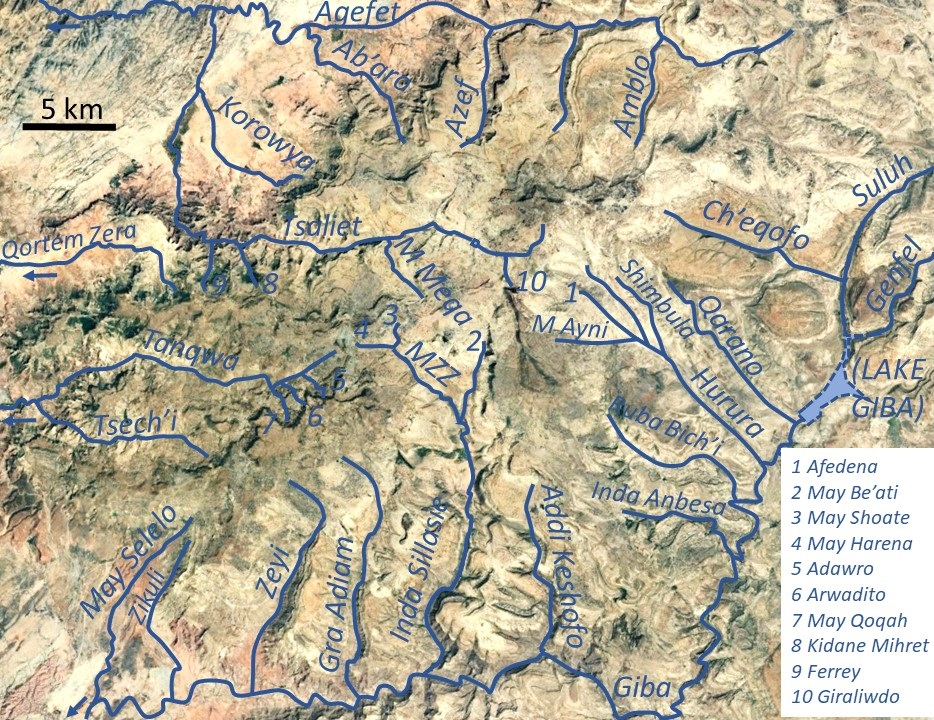
The river in the radial drainage network of Dogu’a Tembien

== Characteristics ==
The Ab’aro is a confined ephemeral river in its upper part, whereas it widely meanders in the lower plains, with an average slope gradient of 60 metres per kilometre. Towards the footslope the river has cut a deep gorge (a cluse).

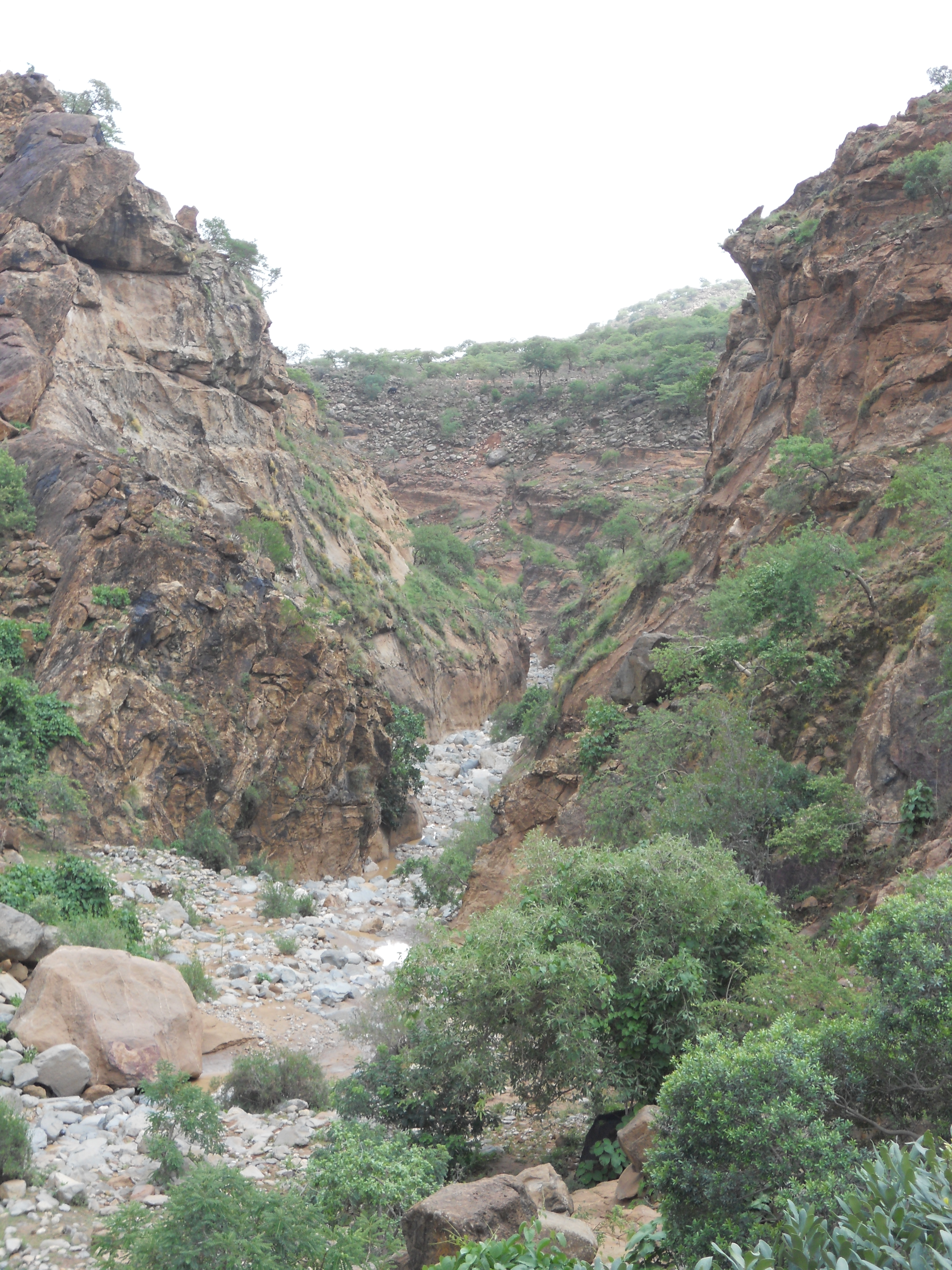
Abaro Gorge

== Flash floods ==
Runoff mostly occurs in the form of high runoff discharge events that occur in a very short period (called flash floods). These are related to the steep topography, often little vegetation cover and intense convective rainfall. The peaks of such flash floods have often a 50 to 100 times larger discharge than the preceding baseflow. In contrast to neighbouring rivers such as May Meqa, May Sho'ate or Graliwdo, the magnitude of floods in Ab’aro has not been decreased due to interventions in the catchment. Physical conservation structures such as stone bunds and check dams that intercept runoff are absent. On the steep slopes, exclosures have not been established and there is no dense vegetation that could contribute to enhanced infiltration, less flooding or better baseflow. As such, it is one of the few catchments that could stand model for conditions before major human interventions for conservation started in the Tigray region.

== Lithology ==
From upstream to downstream, the following lithological units occur in the catchment.

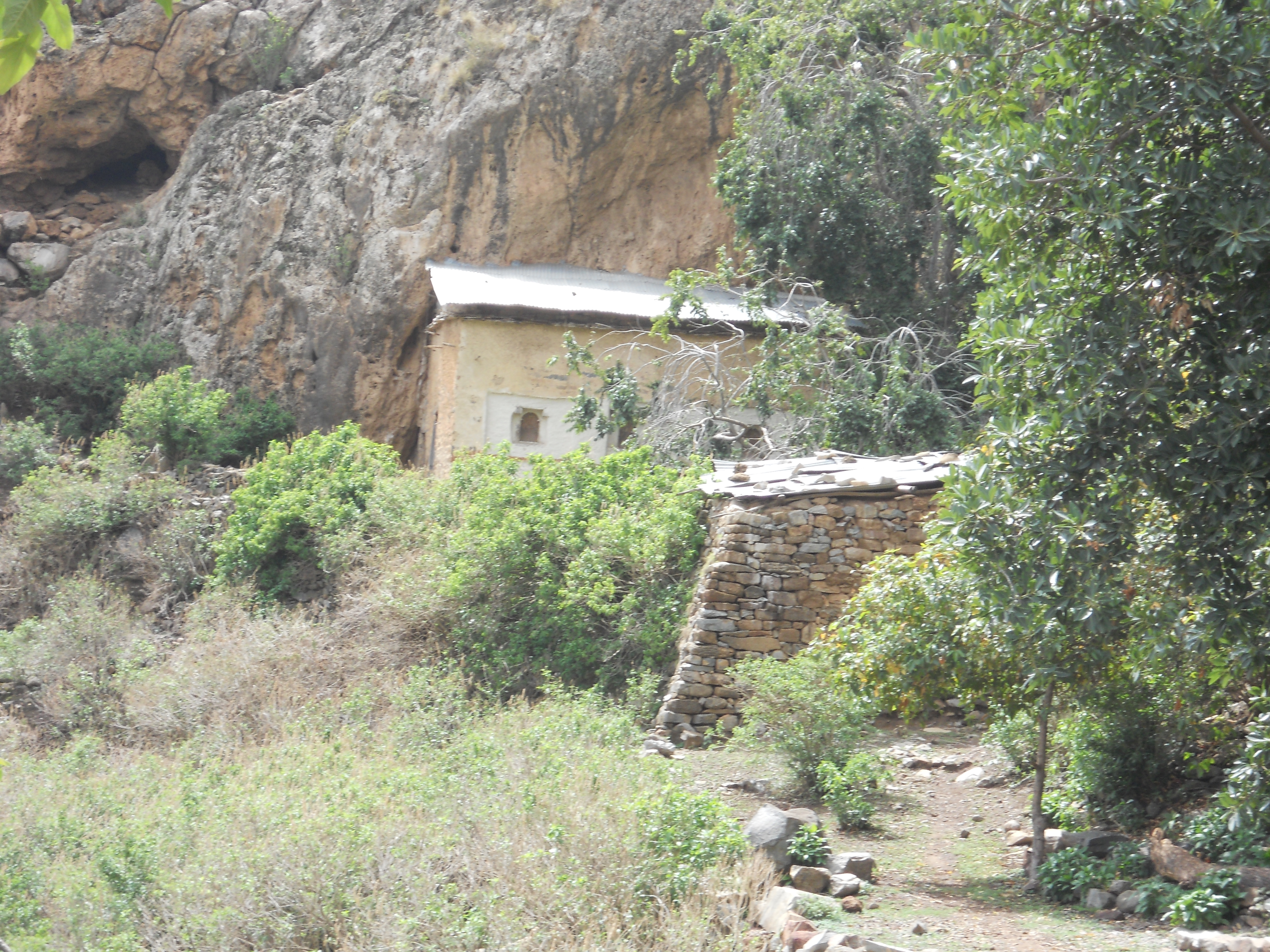
Ab'aro rock church, established in a tufa plug

- Phonolite plugs
- Upper basalt
- Interbedded lacustrine deposits
- Lower basalt
- Amba Aradam Formation
- Antalo Limestone
- Quaternary freshwater tufa
- Adigrat Sandstone

Logically, in the uppermost stretches of the river, only the pebbles and boulders of the upper lithological units will be present in the river bed, whereas more downstream one may find a more comprehensive mix of all lithologies crossed by the river.

== Natural boundary ==
During its course, this river passes through two woredas and constitutes their border for 2 kilometres. On the various parts:

- Dogu’a Tembien to the southeast
- Kola Tembien to the northwest

== Transhumance towards Ab'aro ==
The valley bottoms in along middle Ab'aro have been identified as a transhumance destination zone. Transhumance takes place in the summer rainy season, when the lands near the villages are occupied by crops. Young shepherds will take the village cattle to the gorge and overnight in small caves. The gorges are particularly attractive as a transhumance destination zone, because there is water and good growth of semi-natural vegetation.

== Trekking along the river ==
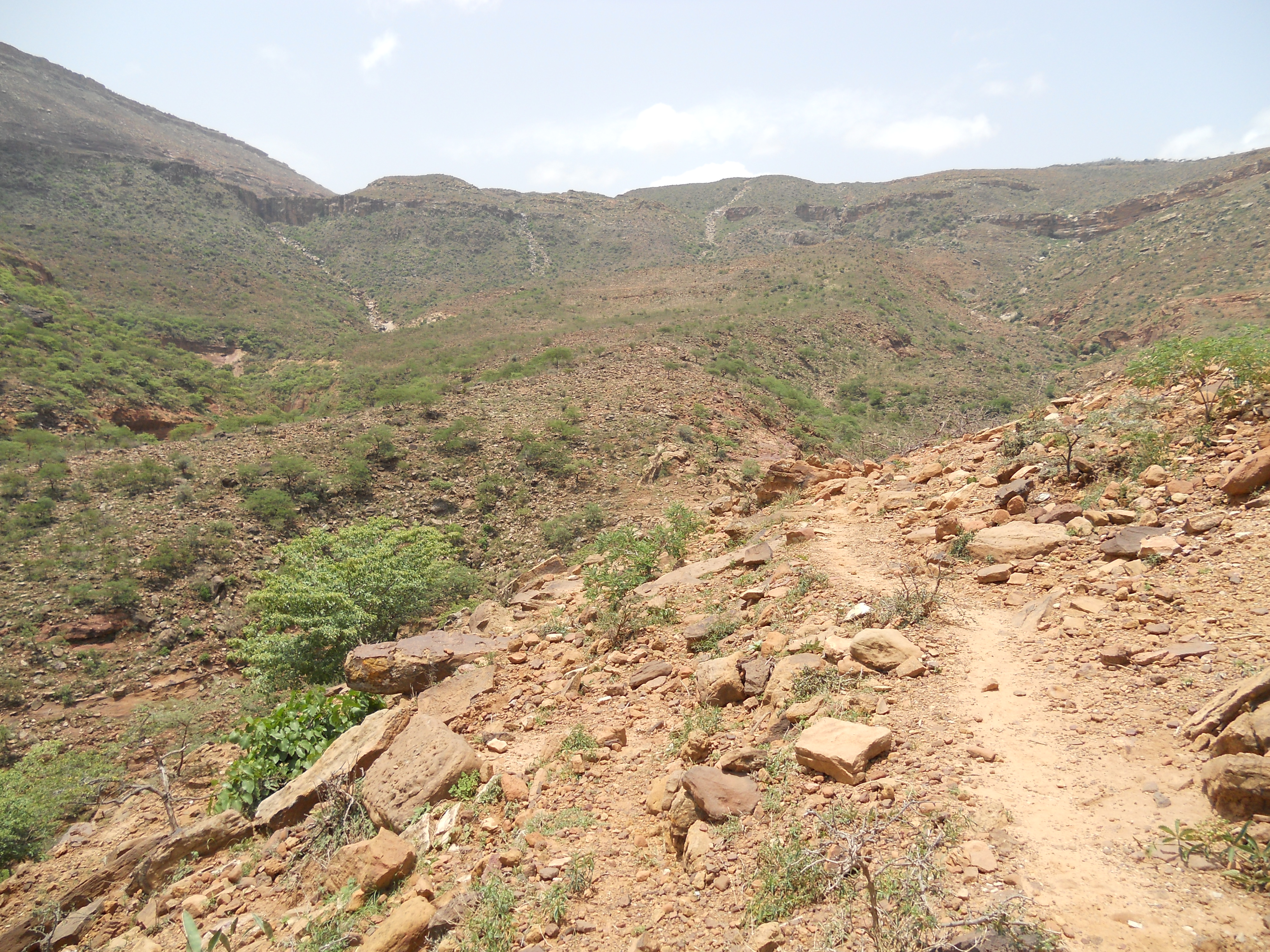
Upper Ab’aro catchment, displaying footpath Gh2

A trekking routes winds across and along this river. The tracks are not marked on the ground but can be followed using downloaded .GPX files. Trek Gh2 roughly follows the river, partly occupying the track of an old road dating back to the time of the Italian occupation. In the rainy season, flash floods may occur and it is advised not to follow the river bed.

== See also ==
- List of Ethiopian rivers
