= Tsigereda =

Tsigereda ጽጌሬዳ
- Town
- Location within Ethiopia
- Coordinates: 13°46′N 39°21′E
- Country: Ethiopia
- Region: Tigray
- Zone: Misraqawi (Eastern)
- Woreda: Gere-alta
- Elevation: 2,000 m (6,600 ft)
- Time zone: UTC+3 (EAT)

Tsigereda (Tigrinya: ጽጌሬዳ) is the capital of Gere-alta woreda (up to 1993, and again starting 2020). Tsigereda means "rose" in the local Tigrigna language.

== History ==
In Imperial times (before 1975), Tsigereda used to be the center of the Gere-alta woreda, part of the former Enderta province. This Gere-alta woreda consisted of the western part of the current Hawzen and Kilte Awulaelo districts.

== Geography ==
The tabia stretches down from the Arebay peaks in Dogu'a Tembien towards the headwaters of Agefet river.

=== Geology ===
From the higher to the lower locations, the following geological formations are present:

- Antalo Limestone
- Quaternary alluvium and freshwater tufa

=== Climate ===
The rainfall pattern shows a very high seasonality with 70 to 80% of the annual rain falling in July and August. Mean temperature in Tsigereda is 22 °C, oscillating between average daily minimum of 12.5 °C and maximum of 31 °C. The contrasts between day and night air temperatures are much larger than seasonal contrasts.

=== Water availability ===
In this area with rains that last only for a couple of months per year, the main rivers (Agefet and Amblo) are not permanent. Reservoirs of different sizes allow harvesting runoff from the rainy season for further use in the dry season. There are traditional surface water harvesting ponds, particularly in places without permanent springs, called rahaya. In addition, horoyo, household ponds, recently constructed with variable success through campaigns. The Ginda'i water reservoir was constructed northwest of the town of Tsigereda for agricultural purposes. It suffers from siltation. Yet, the reservoir strongly contributes to greening the landscape, both through irrigation and seepage water.

== Agriculture and livelihood ==
The population lives essentially from crop farming, supplemented with off-season work in nearby towns. The land is dominated by farmlands which are clearly demarcated and are cropped every year. Hence the agricultural system is a permanent upland farming system. The farmers have adapted their cropping systems to the spatio-temporal variability in rainfall.

== Religion and churches ==
Most inhabitants are Orthodox Christians. Among others, the following churches are located in the tabia: Inda Gabir Emblo, Abune Aregawi and Kidist Maryam.

== Sources ==
- Nyssen, Jan; Jacob, Miro; Frankl, Amaury, eds. (2019). Geo-trekking in Ethiopia's Tropical Mountains. GeoGuide. doi:10.1007/978-3-030-04955-3. ISBN 978-3-030-04954-6.
