= Ginda'i =

- Gindae
- Location within Ethiopia
- Coordinates: 13.771118°N 39.338038°E
- Type: Freshwater artificial lake
- Primary outflows: Agefet
- Basin countries: Ethiopia
- Surface area: 0.135 km^{2} (0.052 sq mi)
- Water volume: 0.793×10^{6} m^{3} (643 acre⋅ft)
- Settlements: Tsigereda

Ginda'i (also spelled Gindae) is a reservoir located in the Kilte Awula’ilo woreda of the Tigray Region in Ethiopia. The earthen dam that holds the reservoir was built in 1998 by SAERT.

== Dam characteristics ==
- Dam height: 19.5 metres
- Dam crest length: 483 metres
- Spillway width: 23.2 metres

== Capacity ==
- Original capacity: 793170 m³
- Dead storage: 142405 m³
- Reservoir area: 13.5 ha

In 2002, the life expectancy of the reservoir (the duration before it is filled with sediment) was estimated at 20 years.

== Irrigation ==
- Designed irrigated area: 54 ha
- Actual irrigated area in 2002: 6 ha

== Environment ==
The catchment of the reservoir is 11.16 km² large. A net erosion map for the Ginda’i catchment shows that sediment deposition occurs at the footslopes, while the maximum erosion rate (more than 150 tonnes per hectare per year) occurred on the steepest slopes. Erosion rates in the cultivated lands are often low, as in the Ginda’i catchment croplands are generally located on slopes which are less than 5% steep. The reservoir suffers from rapid siltation. Part of the water that could be used for irrigation is lost through seepage; the positive side-effect is that this contributes to groundwater recharge.
