= Transhumance in Ethiopia =

Type of pastoralism in the African nation

Cattle shed in a small cave during transhumance in Dogu'a Tembien in North Ethiopia

In the crop growing season, transhumance is practised on a broad scale in the northern Ethiopian Highlands, as farmland and its stubble can no longer be accessed by livestock.

== Definitions ==
Transhumance may be defined as “the practice of herd movements that are seasonal, occurring between two points, following very precise routes and repeated each year”. It is an adaptation to temporal and spatial variability in climatic conditions. It is commonly practised by sedentary populations and should not be confused with pastoralism. Transhumance is part of an agricultural system that combines permanent arable agriculture with the seasonal movement of livestock.

== Organisation of the transhumance ==
Unlike in the Mediterranean region, in the mountains of North Ethiopia, transhumant livestock movements are over distances of less than 20 km. Contact is kept daily with the village. If a village has no access to nearby pasture grounds, the farmers will organise transhumance to a distant place during the crop growing period in the rainy season. Hence, livestock nearby crops is avoided, the grass of village pastures can grow and is saved for later in the season. Transhumance is organised for the cattle; goats and sheep may join. Children (boys) remain with the livestock overnight. The cattle keepers bring the livestock to the best grasslands and water it daily. Evenings, a few adult men, on rotational basis, join the herd and supervise the safety at night of the livestock and the children; they also bring food. In addition, the shepherds drink cow milk. Milk production is relatively high during transhumance due to the availability and plentiful and good forage in the grazing grounds. Excess milk is taken daily to the homesteads for butter preparation. The destination zone of the transhumance is locally called ‘’berekha’’, a term that typically refers to a place that is remote from villages and with a good vegetation cover.

== Alternatives for transhumance ==
During the cropping season the lands around the villages are not accessible for grazing. Livestock owners have three alternatives:

- annual transhumance, particularly towards remote and vast grazing grounds
- daily movements with livestock back-and-forth to the grazing grounds, the “home range herders” – they travel back and forth daily to grazing grounds that are a few kilometres away
- keeping livestock nearby to the homesteads In some villages most people with not practice transhumance, but even in villages which practice transhumance, some will prefer using the nearby grazing grounds.

If the grazing lands are far from the village, deep in the gorge, livestock will stay there overnight (transhumance) with children and a few adults keeping them.

== Some examples ==
- The cattle of Addi Geza'iti (2580 m) in Dogu’a Tembien are brought every rainy season to the gorge of River Tsaliet (1930 m) that holds dense vegetation. The cattle keepers establish enclosures for the cattle and places for them to sleep, often in rock shelters. The cattle stay there until harvesting time, when they are needed for threshing, and when the stubble becomes available for grazing.
- Many cattle of Haddinnet and also Ayninbirkekin tabias are brought to the foot of the escarpment at Ab'aro, with all herds passing through Ksad Azef pass. Cattle stay there on wide rangelands. Some cattle keepers move far down to open woodland and establish their camp in large caves in sandstone.
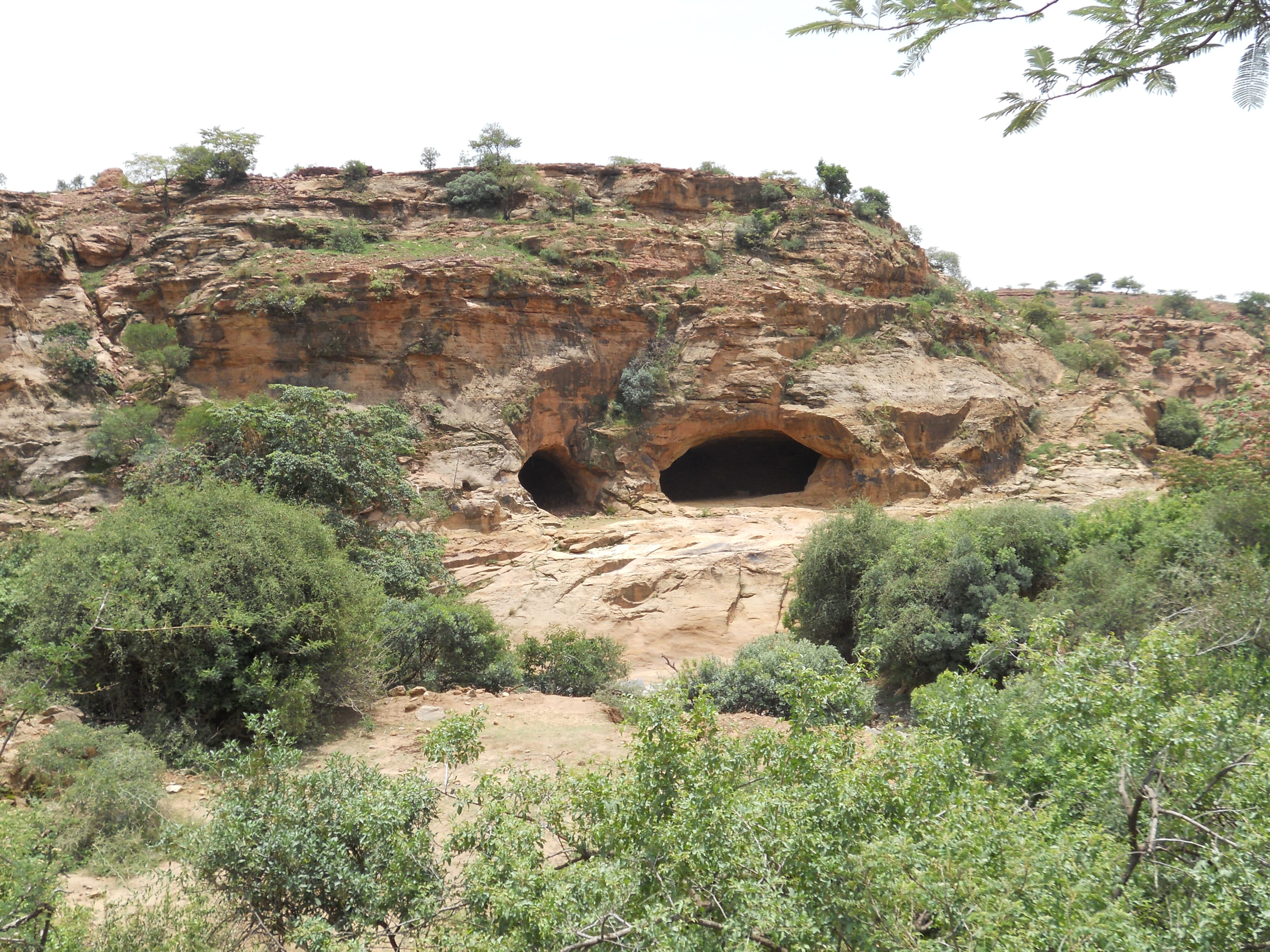
  The “red caves” or Kayeh Be’ati in Adigrat Sandstone, a preferred destination for transhumance
- In Kokolo (2060 m) in Inderta, the herds are taken to the Giba River valley (1680 m). Here, around 1995, one of the village families has established itself in the valley and occupied the best rock shelters, transforming them into permanent cattle sheds. Others have followed, and now a small settlement (Inda Mihtsun) has been established.
- The escarpment of the Rift Valley, with its wide secondary vegetation, is a destination zone for transhumance, both for cattle belonging to the farmers from the Wajirat (Tigray) Highlands, and the cattle belonging to semi-pastoralists from the Kalla (Afar) lowlands. The main reasons are access to water and pastures as well as mental land claims over the area.

== Rationale ==
In the rainy season, the destination zones have much better fodder and water, when compared to the lands nearby the villages. Large amounts of fodder are available as the areas extensive and with low population density. An additional good reason for transhumance to grazing grounds in deep gorges is that the soils are sandy and shallow there, and temperature is higher, so that the herbaceous vegetation has only good stands during the rains.

== Schooling of the cattle keepers ==
As transhumance takes place in summer, during school holidays, the transhumance does not affect schooling. Young herders take their text books of the upcoming school year to the grazing grounds. Among the popular games on the grasslands, football (introduced via schools) tends to replace the traditional ‘’qarsa’’ game. Furthermore, cropping has become more intensive and needs more labour; the establishment of exclosures and the expansion of cropland have led to less grazing ground. Hence, fewer people send their cattle in transhumance.

== Drawbacks ==
- Transmission of human and livestock diseases
- Excessive removal of the woody vegetation of the transhumance destination areas
- Conflicts between ethnic groups
