= Haddinnet =

Municipality in Tigray Region, Ethiopia

Haddinnet Hadnet
- Tabia
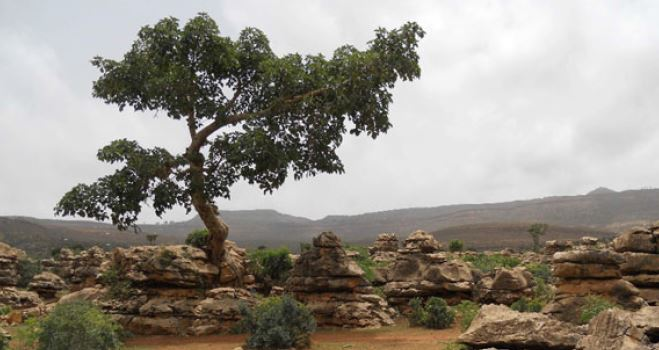
- Slopes of Tsili ridge in Haddinnet

- Location within Ethiopia
- Coordinates: 13°42′N 39°12′E
- Country: Ethiopia
- Region: Tigray
- Zone: Debub Misraqawi (Southeastern)
- Woreda: Dogu'a Tembien

Area
  - Total: 69.37 km^{2} (26.78 sq mi)
- Elevation: 2,200 m (7,200 ft)

Population (2007)
  - Total: 7,310
  - Density: 105/km^{2} (270/sq mi)
- Time zone: UTC+3 (EAT)

Haddinnet, also transliterated as Hadnet, is a tabia or municipality in the Dogu'a Tembien district of the Tigray Region of Ethiopia. The tabia centre is in Addi Idaga village, located approximately 6.5 km to the northeast of the woreda town Hagere Selam.

== Geography ==
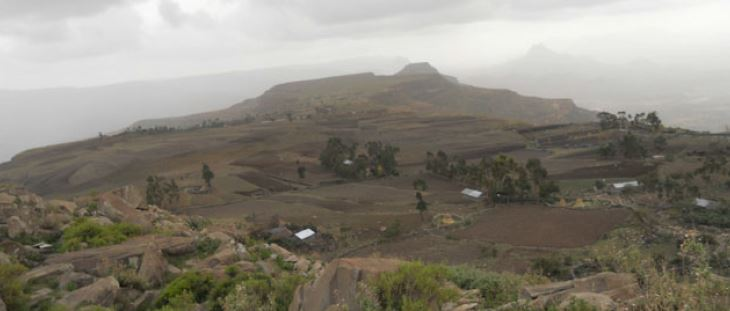
The narrow top of Tsili ridge

The tabia is located on the southern and northern slopes of the Tsili ridge in the northern part of Dogu'a Tembien. The highest peak is Dabba Selama (2630 m a.s.l.) (not to be confounded with the homonymous monastery) and the lowest place along Agefet River (1720 m a.s.l.).

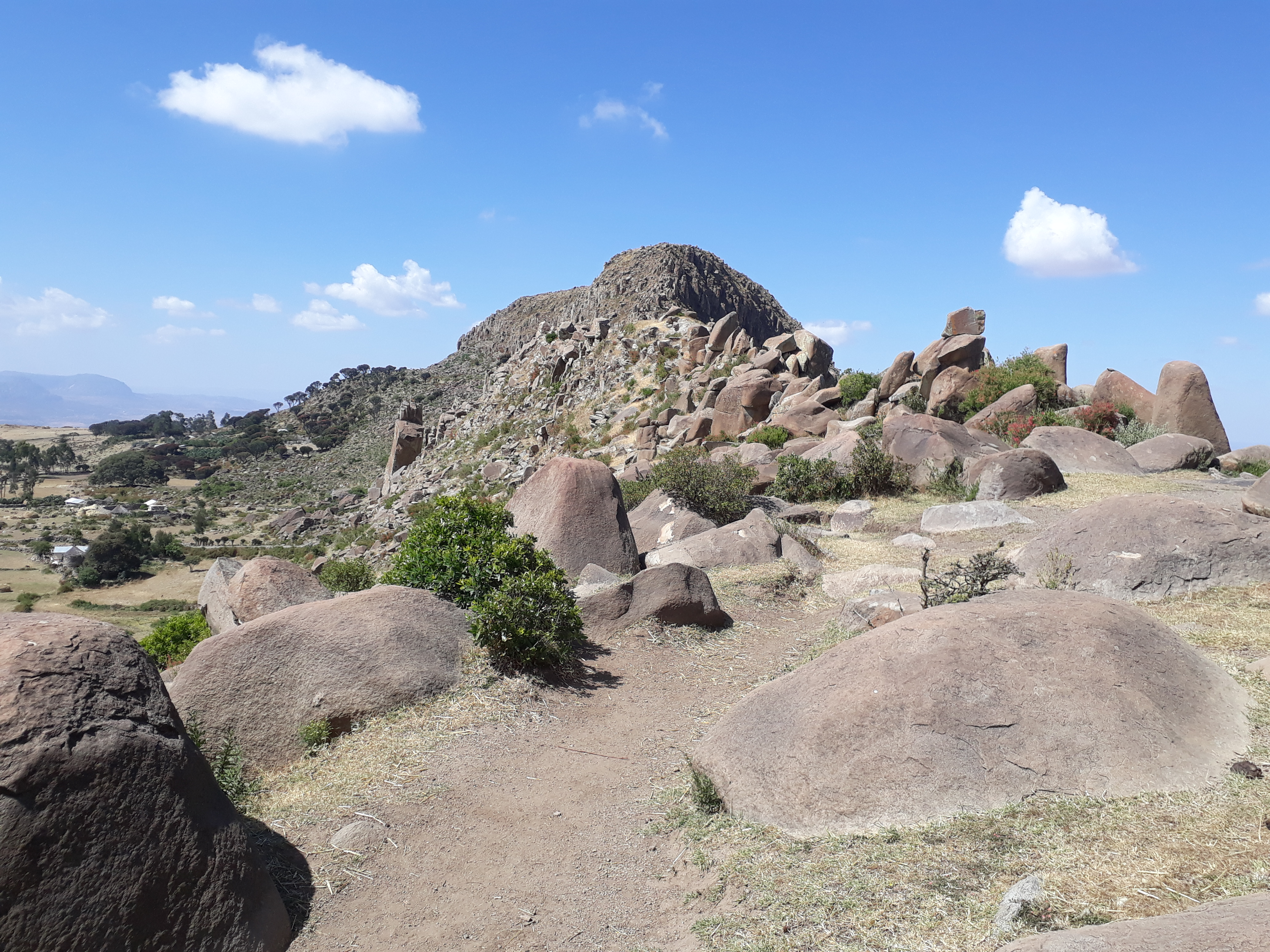
For some part, the Tsili ridge is formed by a phonolite dike

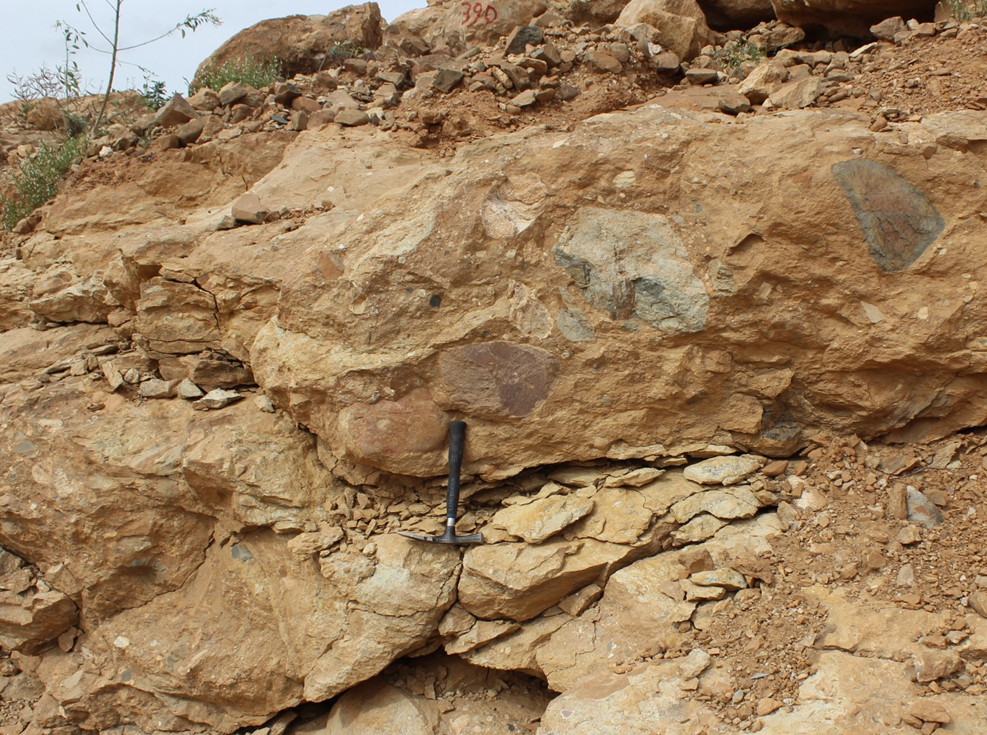
Outcrop of Edaga Arbi glacials as it can be found near the Agefet River, at the north of Haddinnet

=== Geology ===
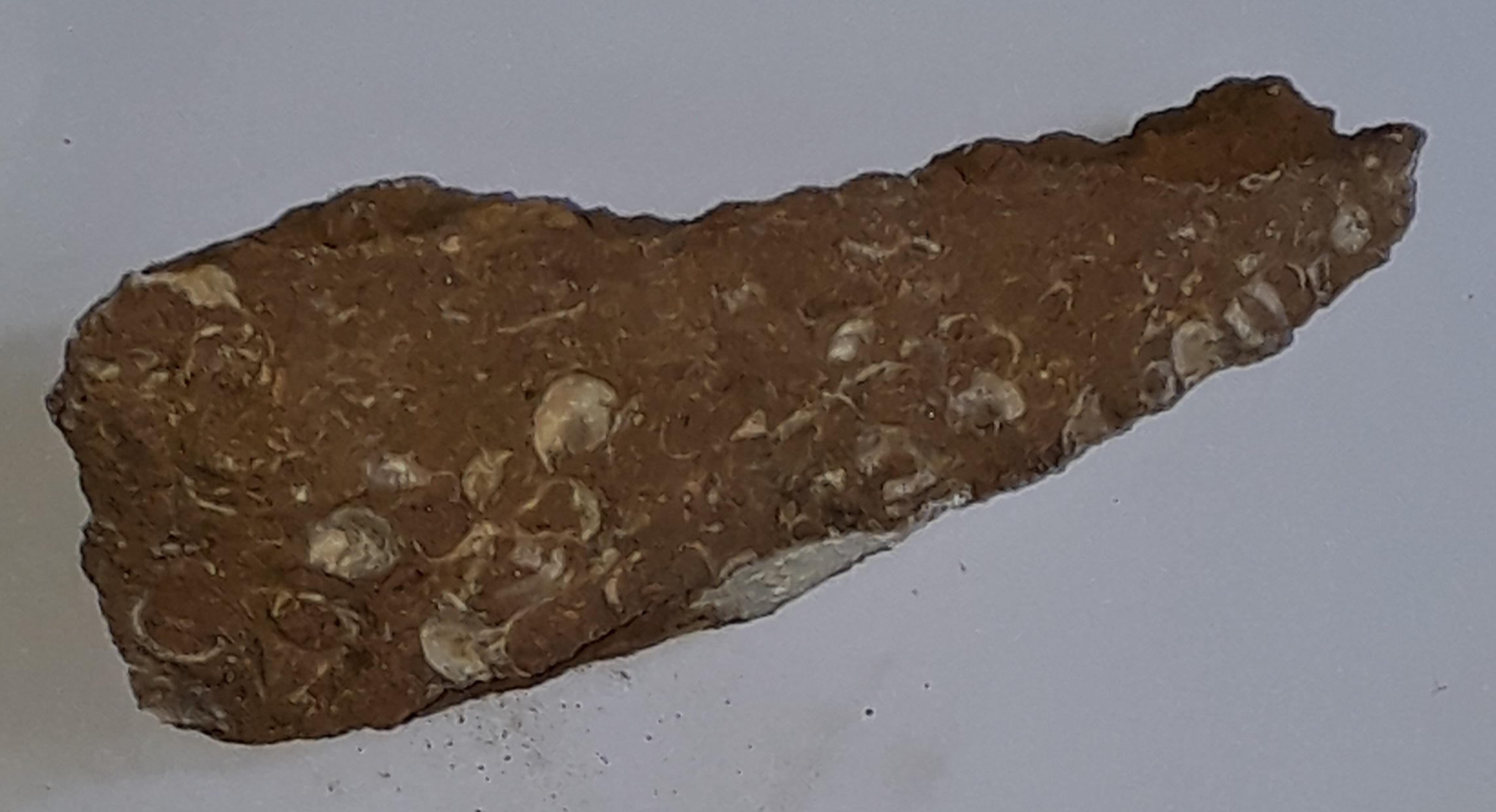
Rock sample of Antalo Limestone with mollusks, collected in Azef

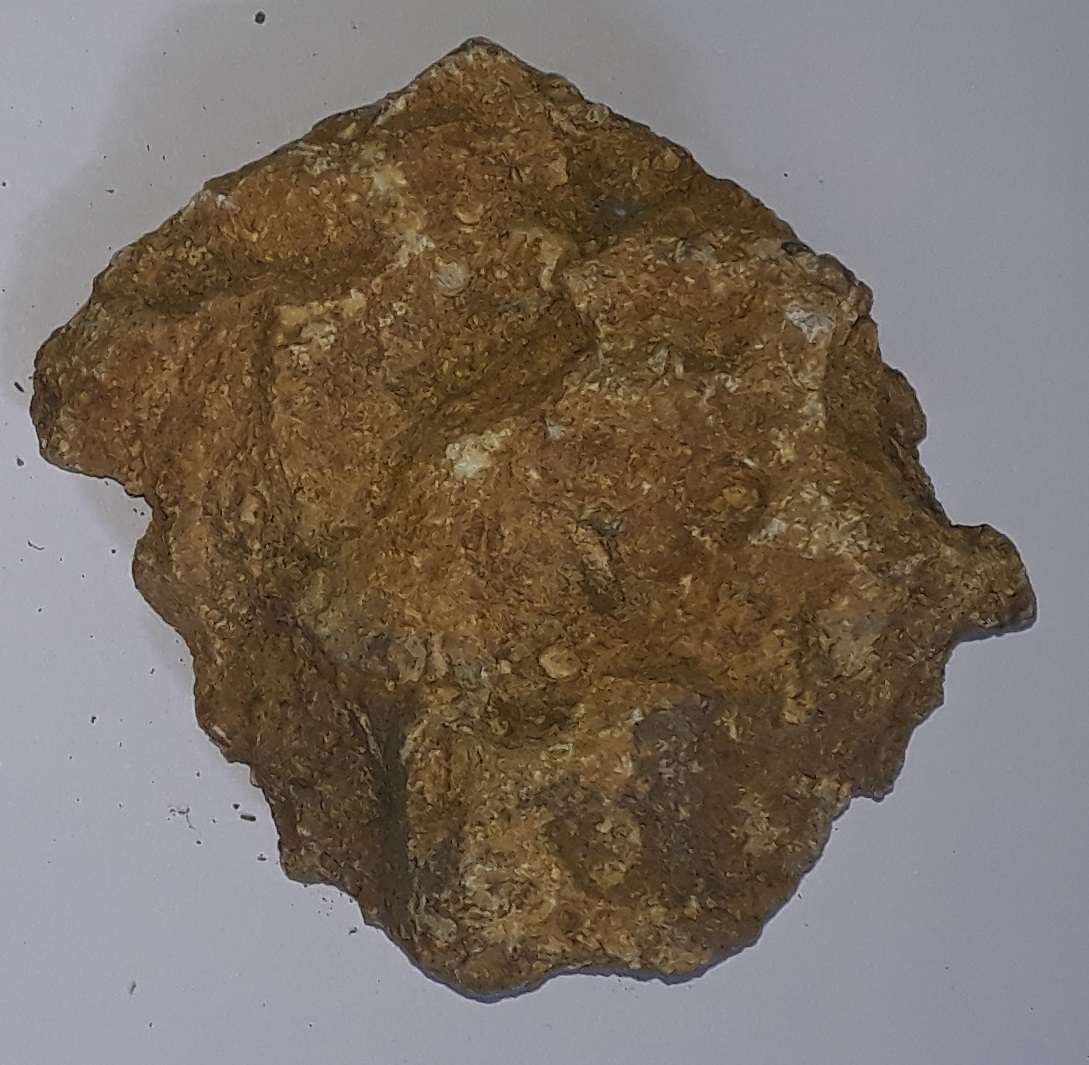
Rock sample of Antalo Limestone (sandy limestone), collected in Addi Idaga

From the higher to the lower locations, the following geological formations are present:

- Phonolite plugs
- Upper basalt
- Interbedded lacustrine deposits
- Lower basalt
- Amba Aradam Formation
- Agula Shale
- Antalo Limestone
- Adigrat Sandstone
- Edaga Arbi Glacials
- Quaternary alluvium and freshwater tufa

=== Climate ===
The rainfall pattern shows a very high seasonality with 70 to 80% of the annual rain falling in July and August. Mean temperature in Addi Idaga is 20.4 °C, oscillating between average daily minimum of 11.5 °C and maximum of 28.9 °C. The contrasts between day and night air temperatures are much larger than seasonal contrasts.

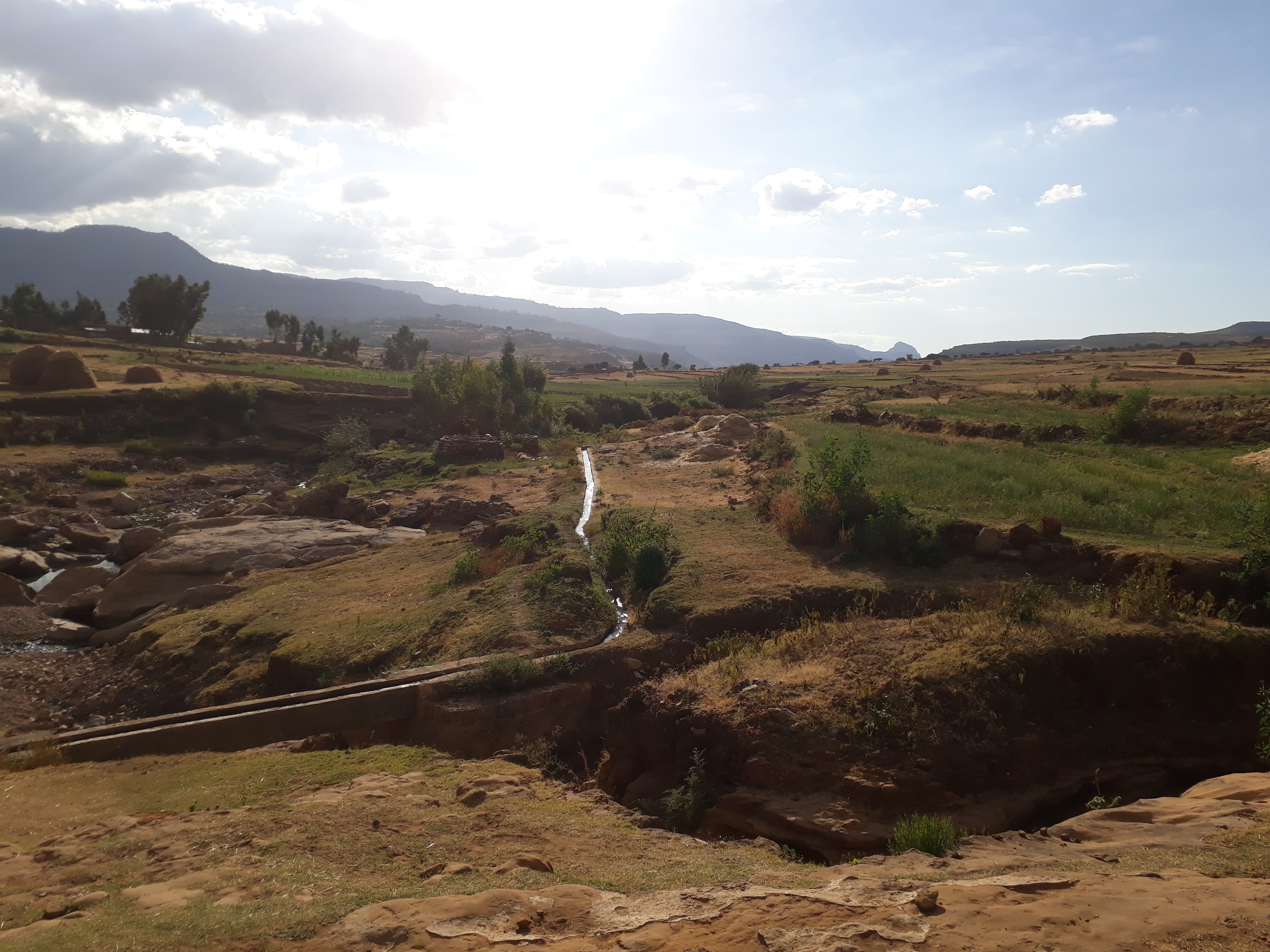
Ruba Weyni irrigation scheme

=== Springs ===
As there is very poor baseflow in the permanent rivers, the presence of springs is of utmost importance for the local people. The main springs in the tabia are:

- Ruba Weyni, fed by seepage from May Leiba reservoir
- May Damo in Atsa
- Abune Ayezgi in Debre Medhanit

=== Reservoirs ===
In this area with rains that last only for a couple of months per year, reservoirs of different sizes allow harvesting runoff from the rainy season for further use in the dry season. Overall they suffer from siltation. Yet, they strongly contribute to greening the landscape, either through irrigation or seepage water. Main reservoirs are:

- May Leiba reservoir, in Ayninbirkekin tabia, constructed in 1998
- Traditional surface water harvesting ponds, particularly in places without permanent springs, called rahaya
- Horoyo, household ponds, recently constructed through campaigns

=== Vegetation and exclosures ===
The tabia holds several exclosures, areas that are set aside for regreening. Wood harvesting and livestock range are not allowed there. Besides effects on biodiversity, water infiltration, protection from flooding, sediment deposition, carbon sequestration, people commonly have economic benefits from these exclosures through grass harvesting, beekeeping and other non-timber forest products. The local inhabitants also consider it as “land set aside for future generations”.

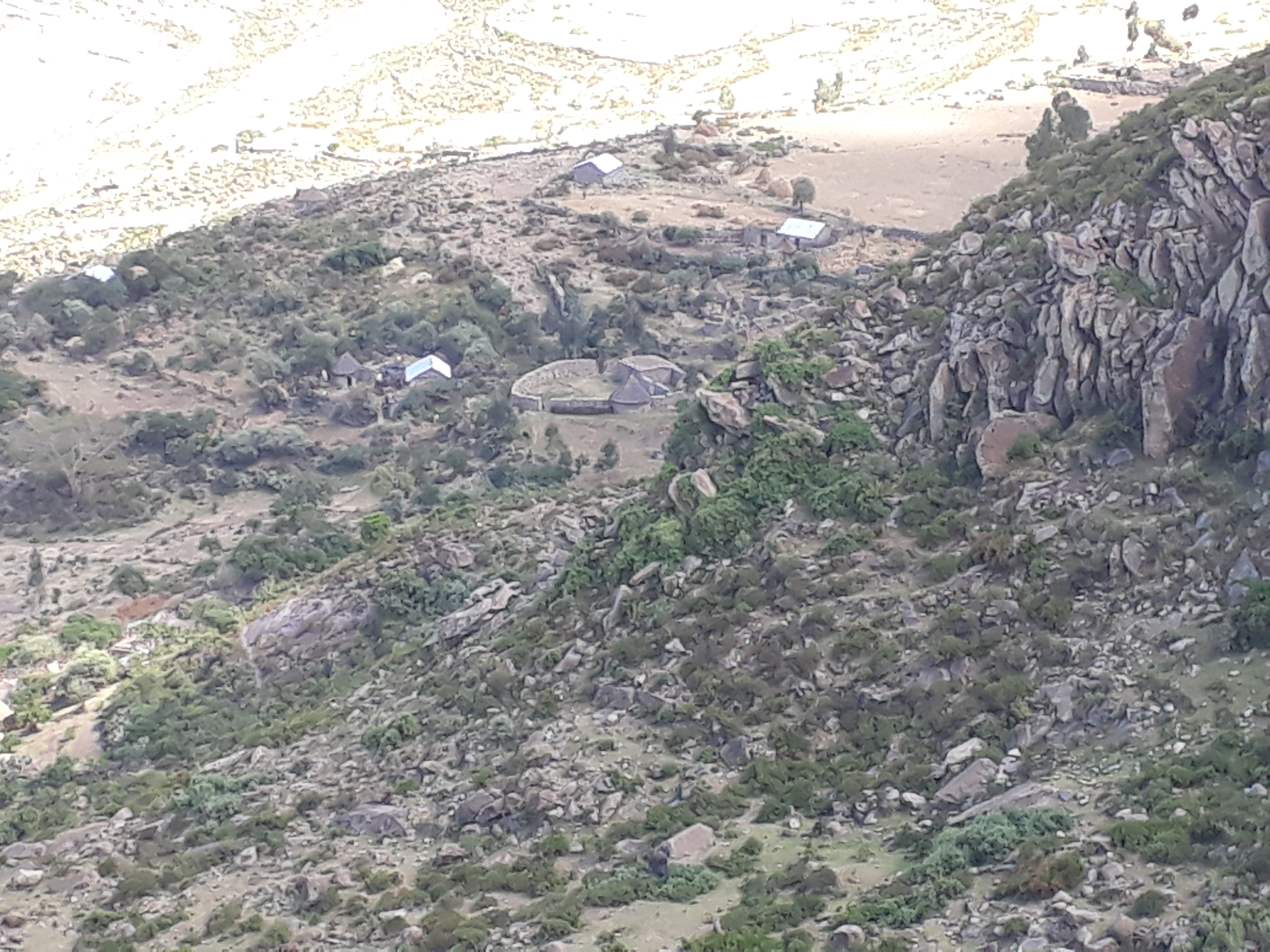
Homesteads in Atsa are largely built from clinckstone

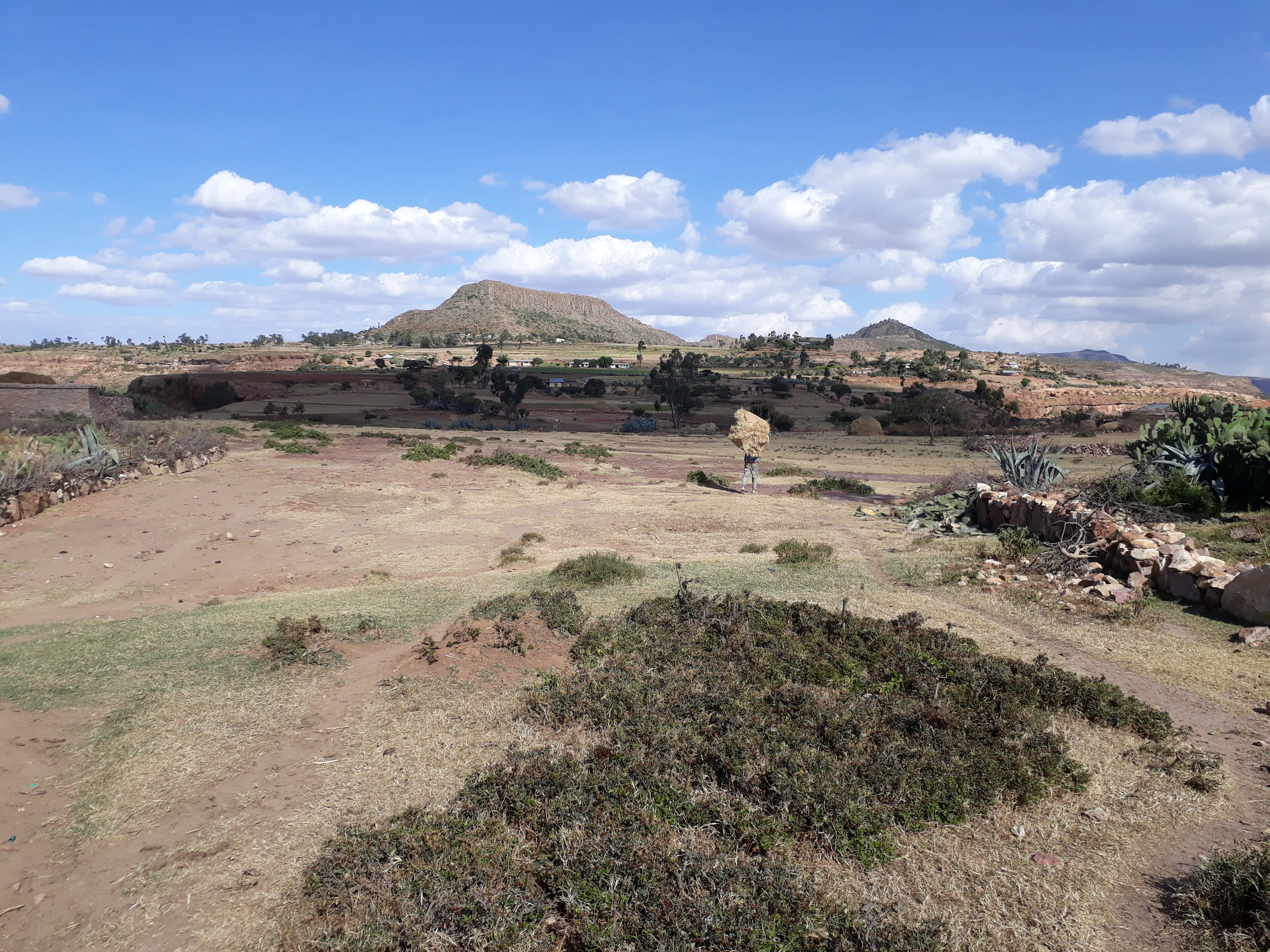
Tsili village

=== Settlements ===
The tabia centre Addi Idaga holds a few administrative offices, a health post, a primary school, and some small shops. Saturday is the market day. There are a few more primary schools across the tabia. The main other populated places are:

- Atsa
- Debre Medhanit or Degoleshuma
- Azef
- Iriya
- Wehabit
- Ruba Weyni

- Tsigaba
- Tsili
- Hawatsu
- Bet Anagro
- Abune Ayezgi
- Addi Hamushenay

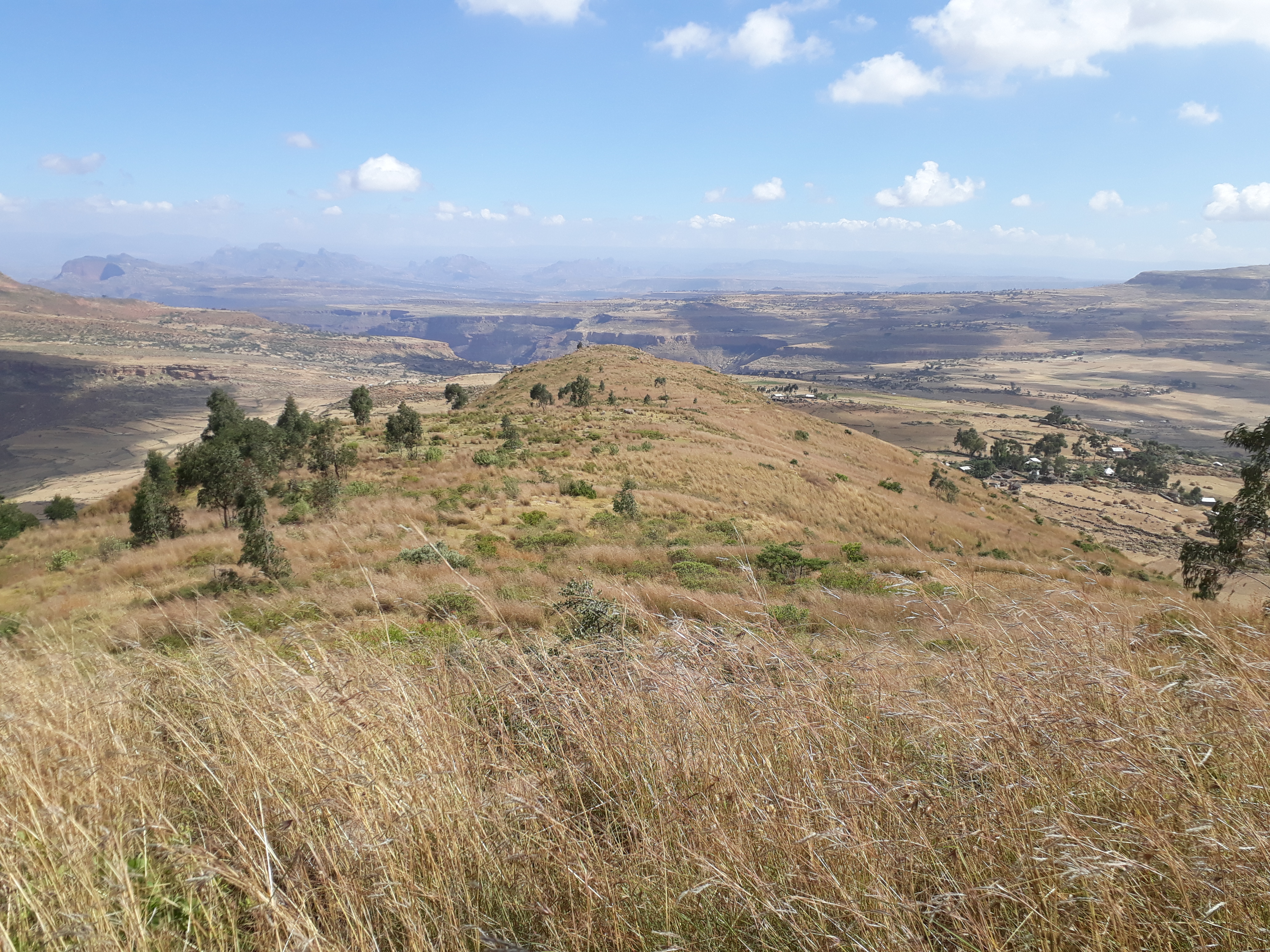
Grassland on Imba Abba Salama

== Agriculture and livelihood ==
The population lives essentially from crop farming, supplemented with off-season work in nearby towns. The land is dominated by farmlands which are clearly demarcated and are cropped every year. Hence the agricultural system is a permanent upland farming system. The farmers have adapted their cropping systems to the spatio-temporal variability in rainfall. Large irrigated lands have been established in Addi Idaga. The youngsters of the tabia have established wide grasslands on mountain ridges; the grass is mainly sold for thatching.

== History and culture ==
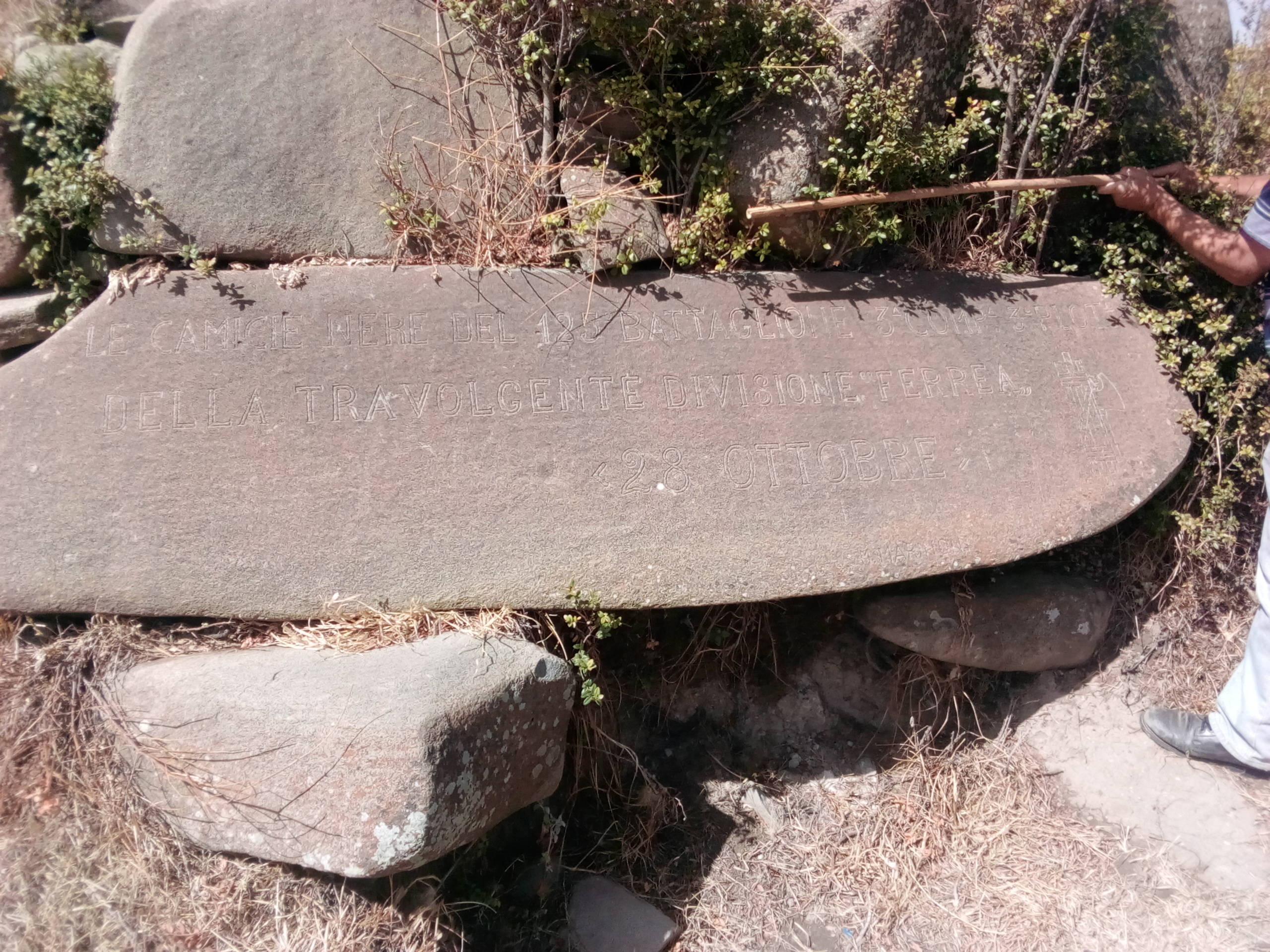
Italian memorial stone on the top of Dabba Selama Mountain

=== History ===
The history of the tabia is strongly confounded with the history of Tembien. In the 1930s, during the Italian invasion, Ksad Azef (13°44.2′N 39°13′E) was an important battlefield during the First Battle of Tembien. It is a place through which the Tembien highlands could relatively easily be accessed when coming from the Gheralta lowlands. The Italians called it Passo Abaro. Italian Blackshirt soldiers left a memorial stone on top of the nearby Mount Dabba Selama.

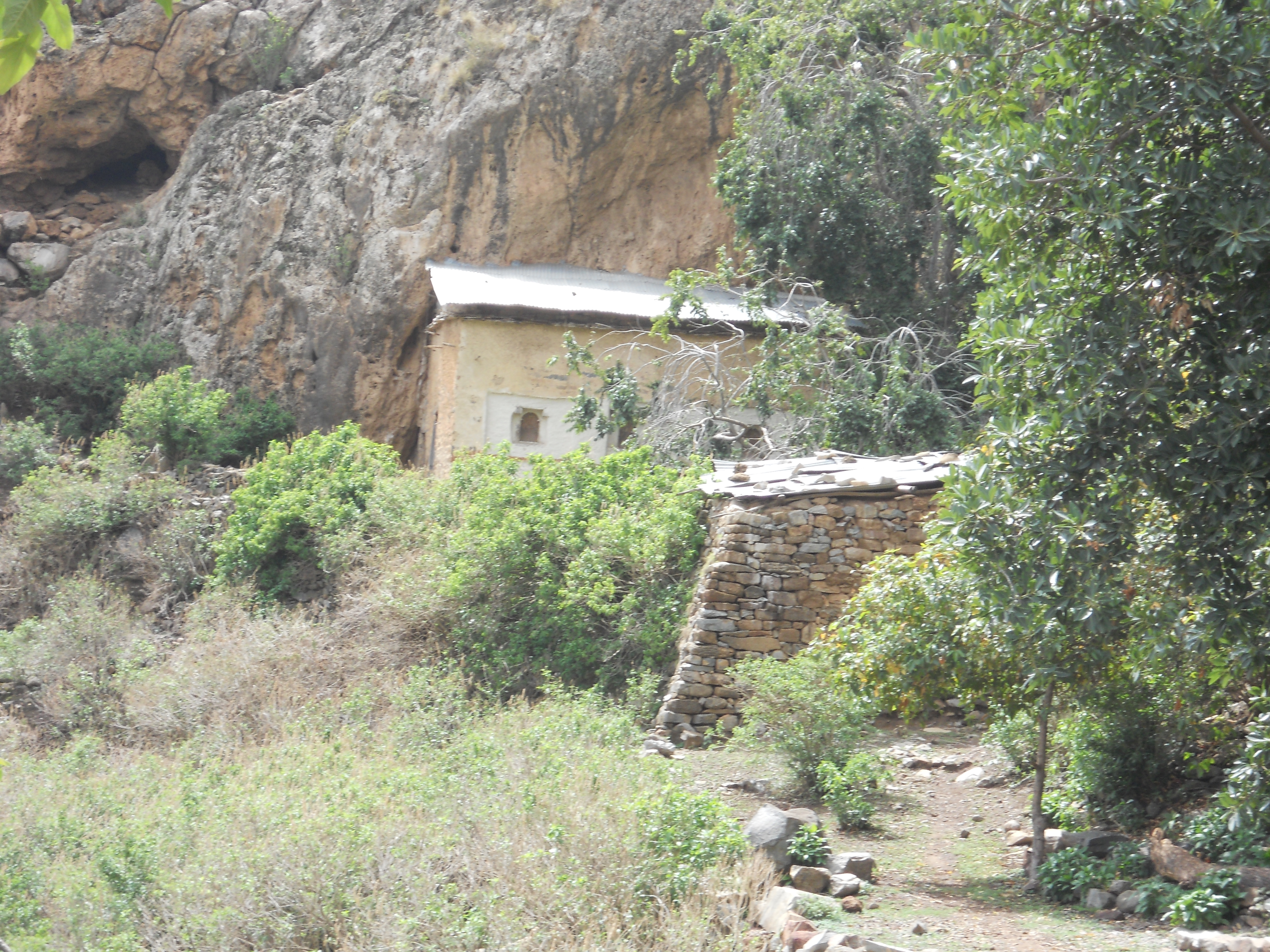
Ab'aro rock church

=== Religion and churches ===
Most inhabitants are Orthodox Christians. The following churches are located in the tabia:

- Ab'aro Kidane Mihret
- Azef Mika'el
- Iriya Mika'el
- Wehabit Sillasie
- Maryam church remnants on the edge of the northern cliff

- Dabba Selama (on top the homonymous mountain)
- Tsili Abo
- Abune Ayezgi
- Bet Anagro Mika'el
- Ruba Weyni Maryam

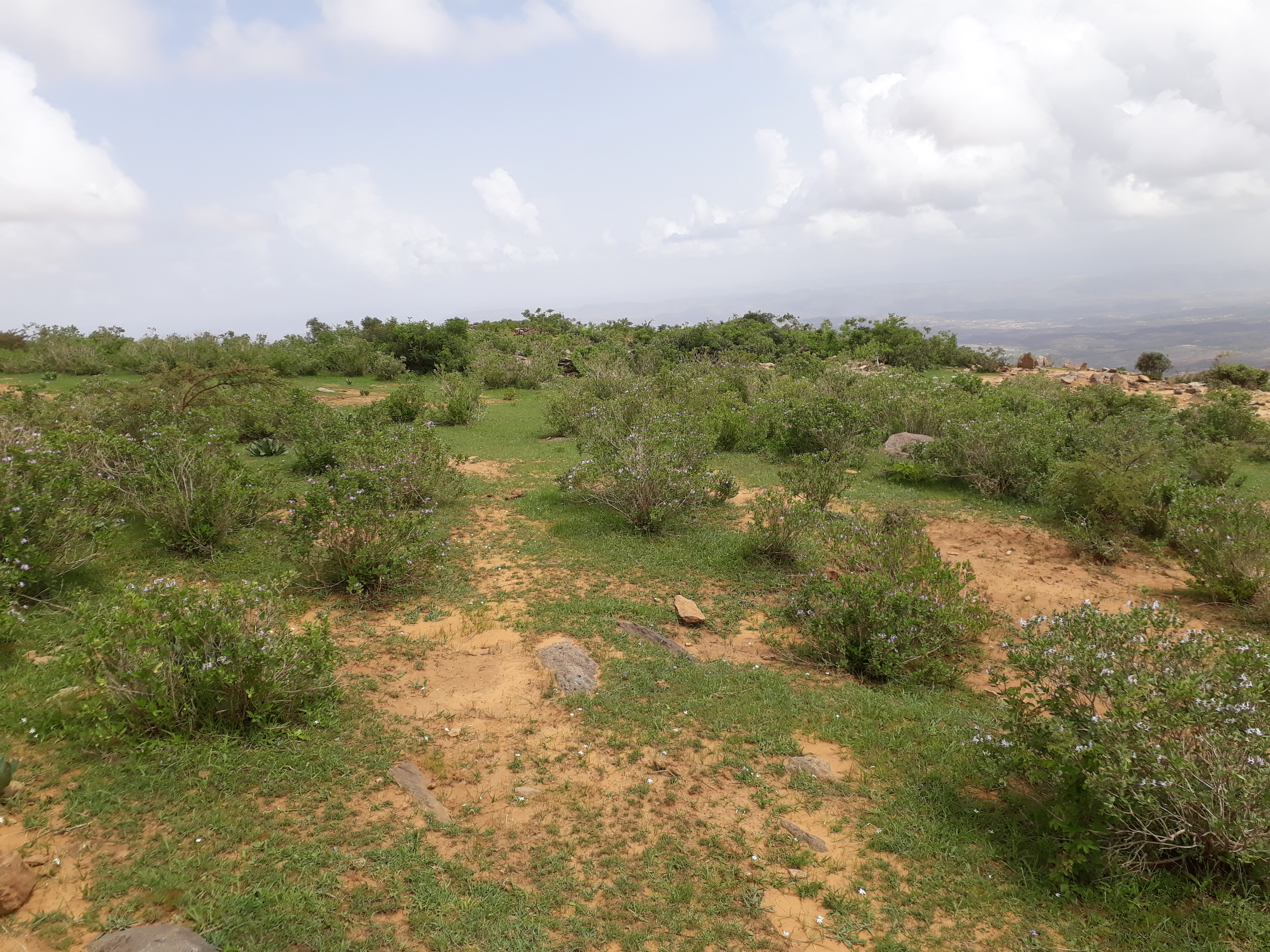
Remnants of Maryam church

=== Inda Siwa, the local beer houses ===
In the main villages, there are traditional beer houses (Inda Siwa), often in unique settings, which are a good place for resting and chatting with the local people. The most renown in the tabia are all located in the tabia centre Addi Idaga:

- Yergalem Assefa
- Mulubrhan Hagos
- Mihret Abrha

== Roads and communication ==
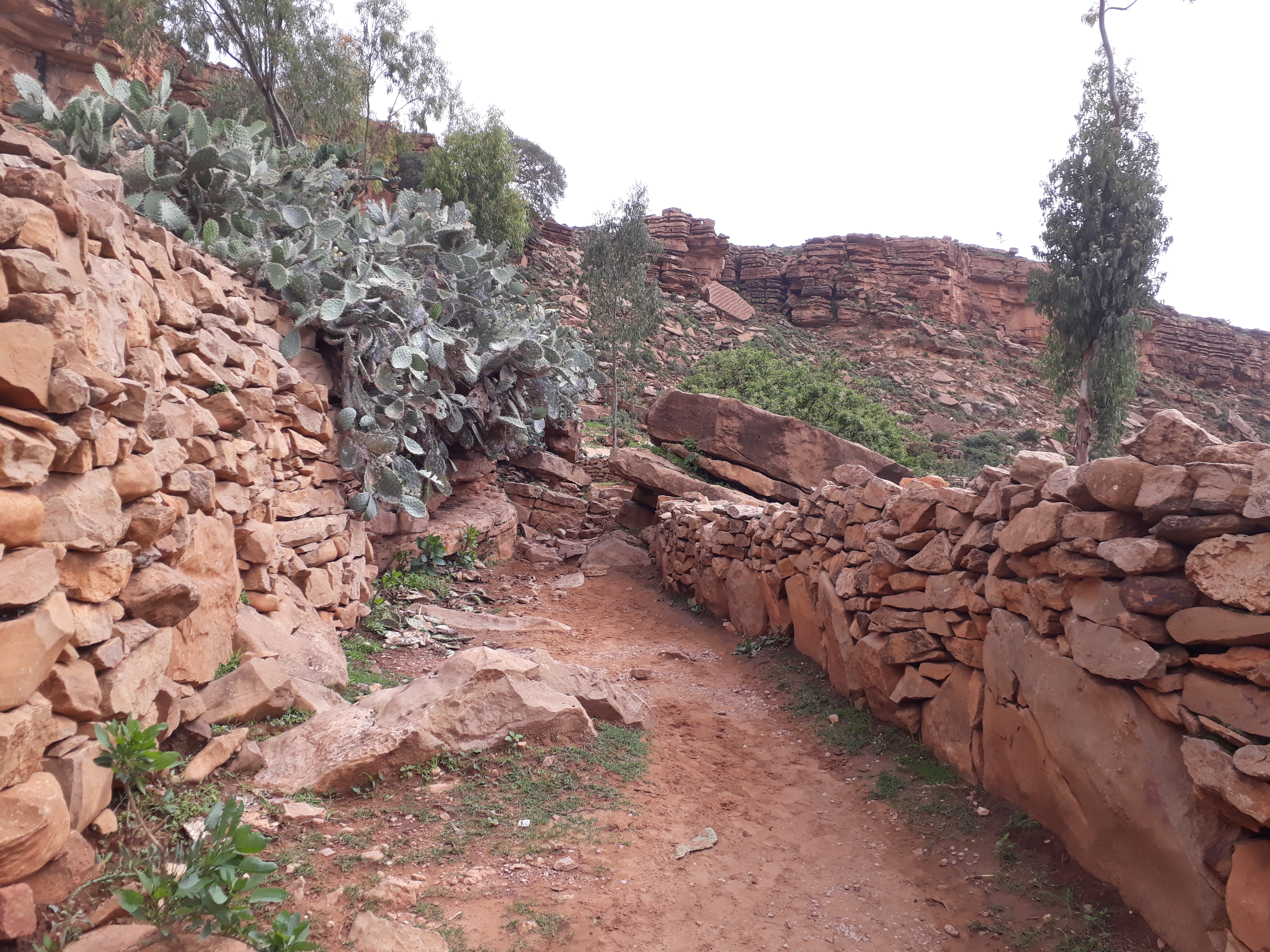
Footpath in Azef

The main road Mekelle – Hagere Selam – Abiy Addi runs 5–10 km south of the tabia. People need to walk long distances to catch a bus. Further, a rural access road links most villages to the main asphalt road.

== Tourism ==
Its mountainous nature and proximity to Mekelle makes the tabia fit for tourism.

=== Touristic attractions ===
- Tsili ridge
- Tinsehe waterfall
- Dabba Selama mountain, with Erica arborea forest, church, and a memorial stone of the 1930s, left by soldiers of the Italian army, a metres-wide phonolite with inscriptions.
- Kidane Mihret rock church in Ab'aro, surrounded by tufa plugs, springs and a cluster of trees. The church was established in widened caves of the tufa plug.

=== Geotouristic sites ===
The high variability of geological formations and the rugged topography invites for geological and geographic tourism or "geotourism". Geosites in the tabia include:

- Wunana valley Vertisol gullies
- Tsili stratigraphic succession
- Grand-Canyon-like landscapes
- Addi Hamushenai cliffs and beehives

- Ab'aro cluse
- Kayeh Be'ati caves
- Azef Maryam church ruins with viewpoint

=== Birdwatching ===
Birdwatching (for the species, see the main Dogu'a Tembien page) can be done particularly in exclosures and forests. The Wehabit Sillasie church forest bird-watching site is particularly interesting.

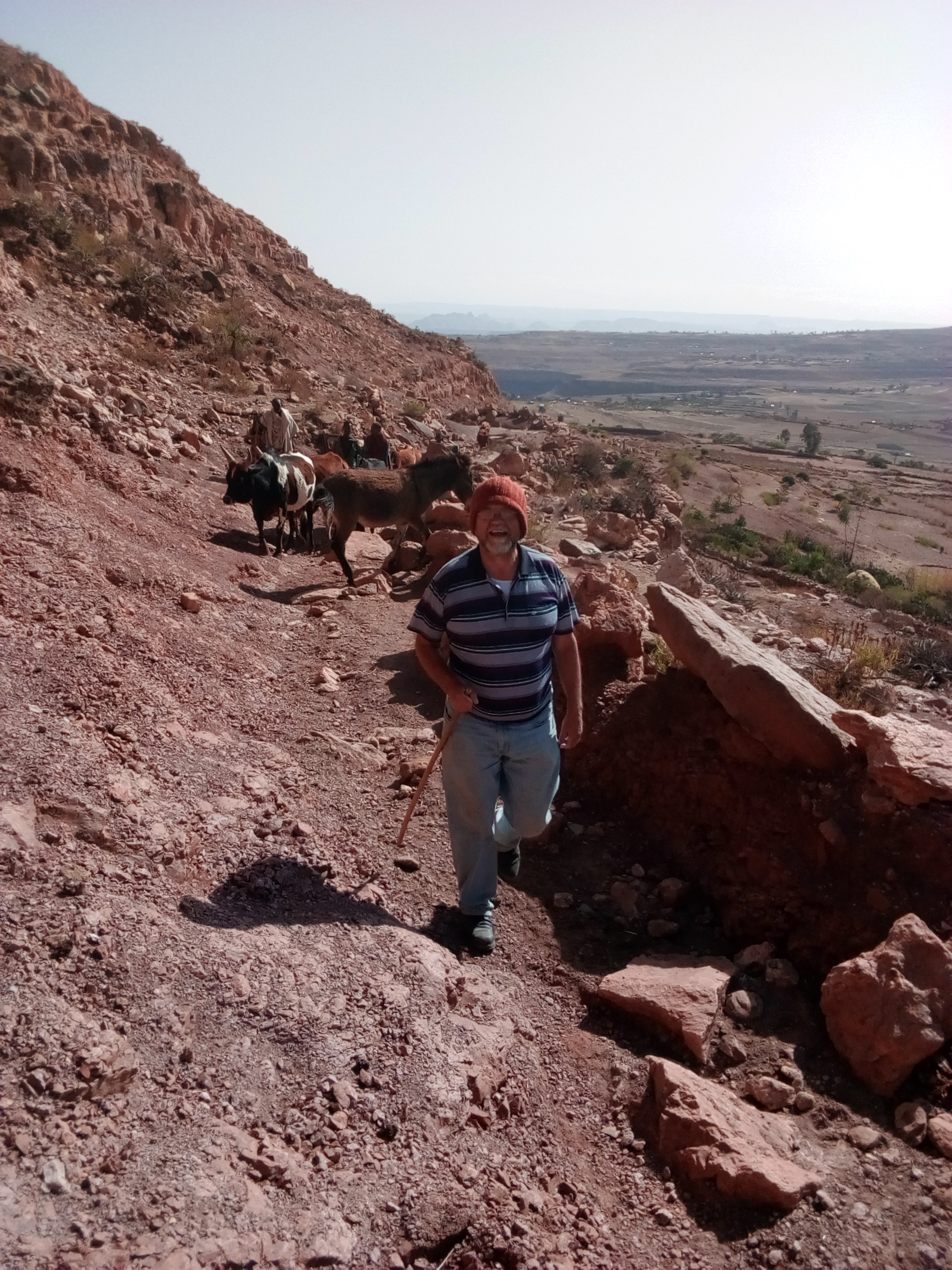
Along trek 23 towards Dabba Selama Mountain

=== Trekking routes ===
Trekking routes have been established in this tabia. The tracks are not marked on the ground but can be followed using downloaded .GPX files.

- Trek 21, along the northern side of Tsaliet gorge up to Addi Hamushenai, and further down to Addeha in Kola Tembien
- Trek 23 to the top of Dabba Selama mountain
- Trek 26, over the top of Tsili ridge
- Trek Gh2, from Addi Idaga, down to Gheralta, along the Ab'aro rock church

=== Accommodation and facilities ===
The facilities are very basic. One may be invited to spend the night in a rural homestead or ask permission to pitch a tent. Hotels are available in Hagere Selam and Mekelle.

== More detailed information ==
For more details on environment, agriculture, rural sociology, hydrology, ecology, culture, etc., see the overall page on the Dogu'a Tembien district.

== Gallery ==
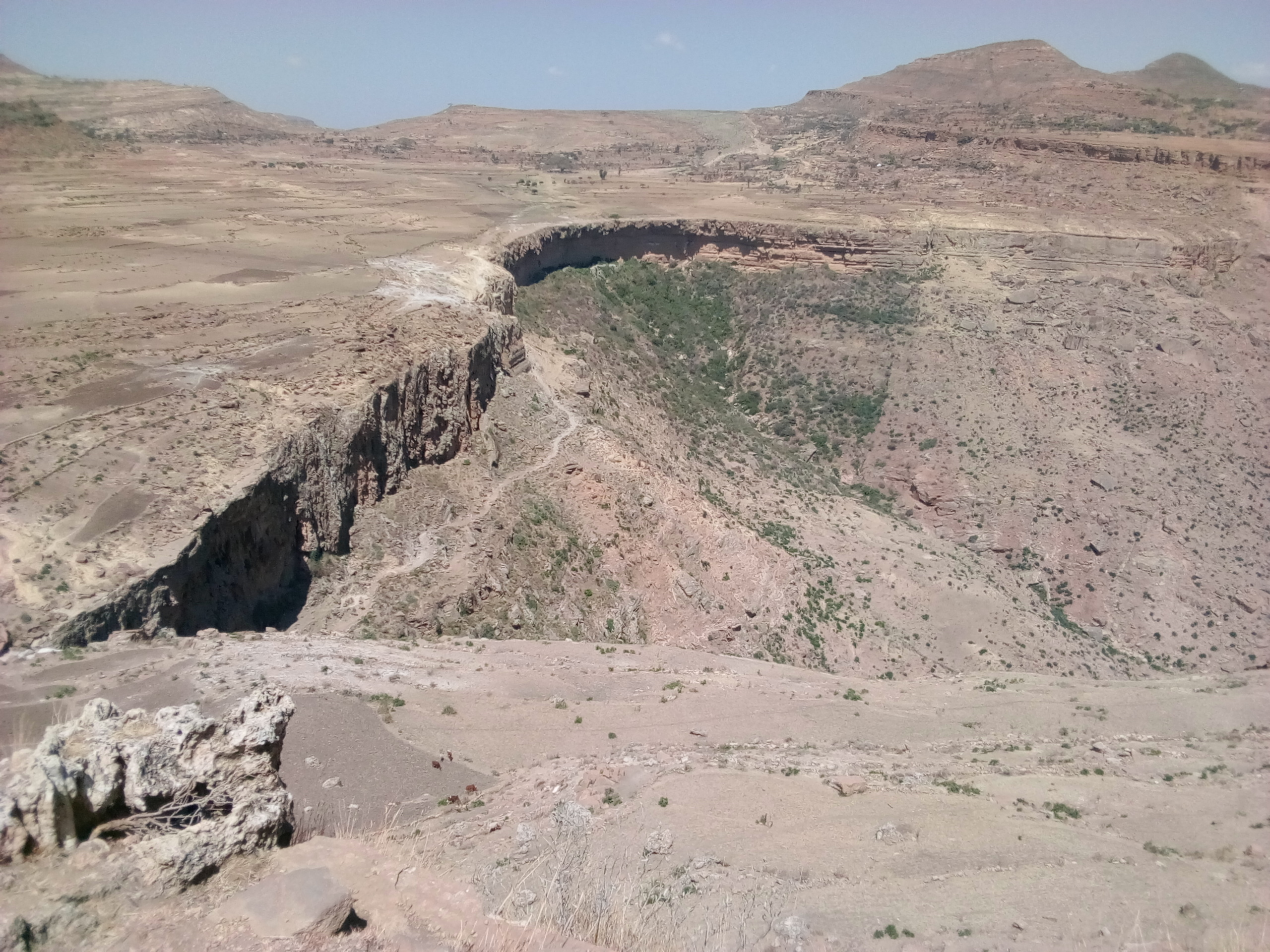
View on Azef

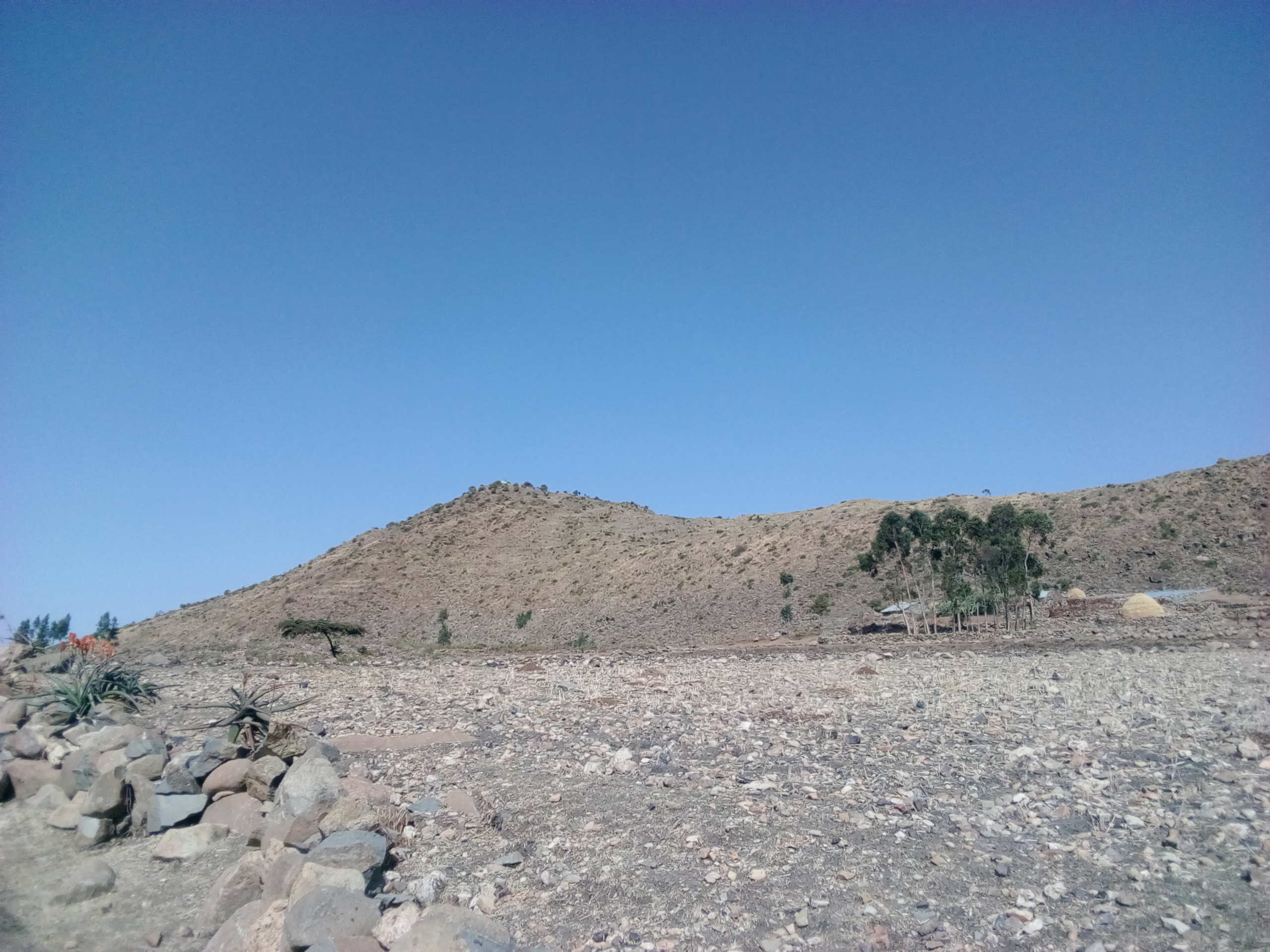
Dabba Selama Mountain

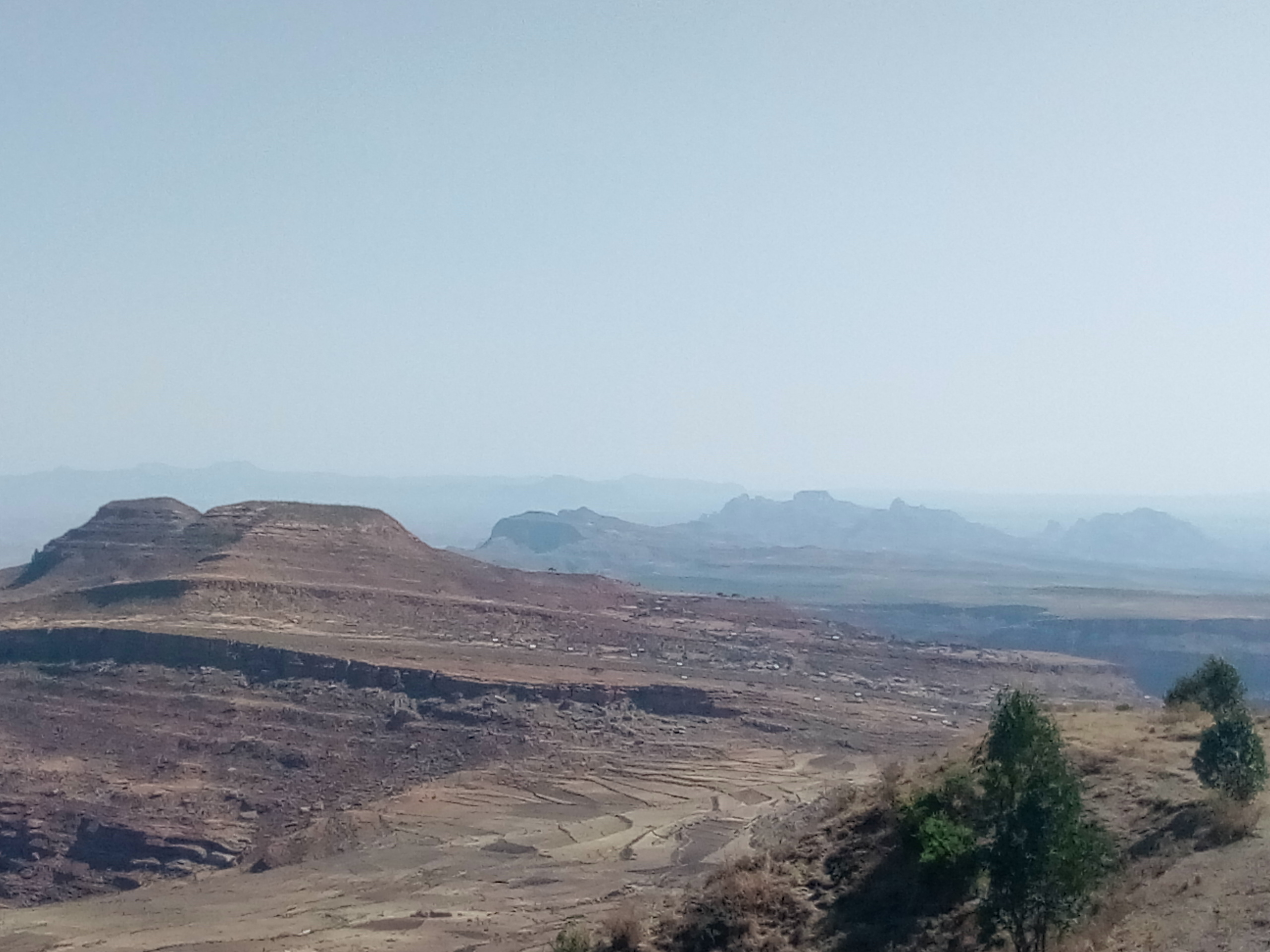
Ksad Azef Mountain Pass

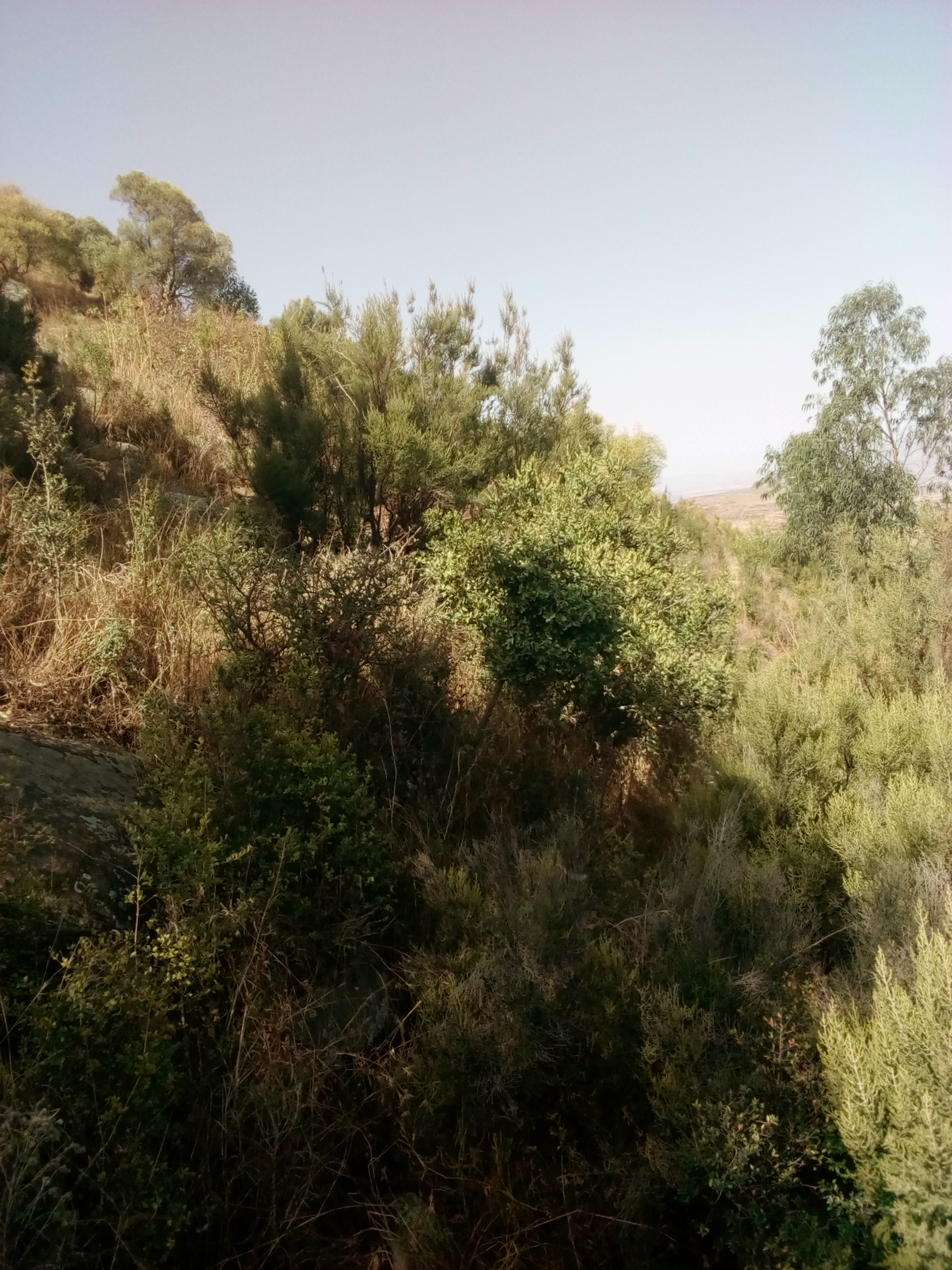
Erica arborea on Dabba Selama Mountain
