= Sulluh =

River in the Tigray highlands of Ethiopia

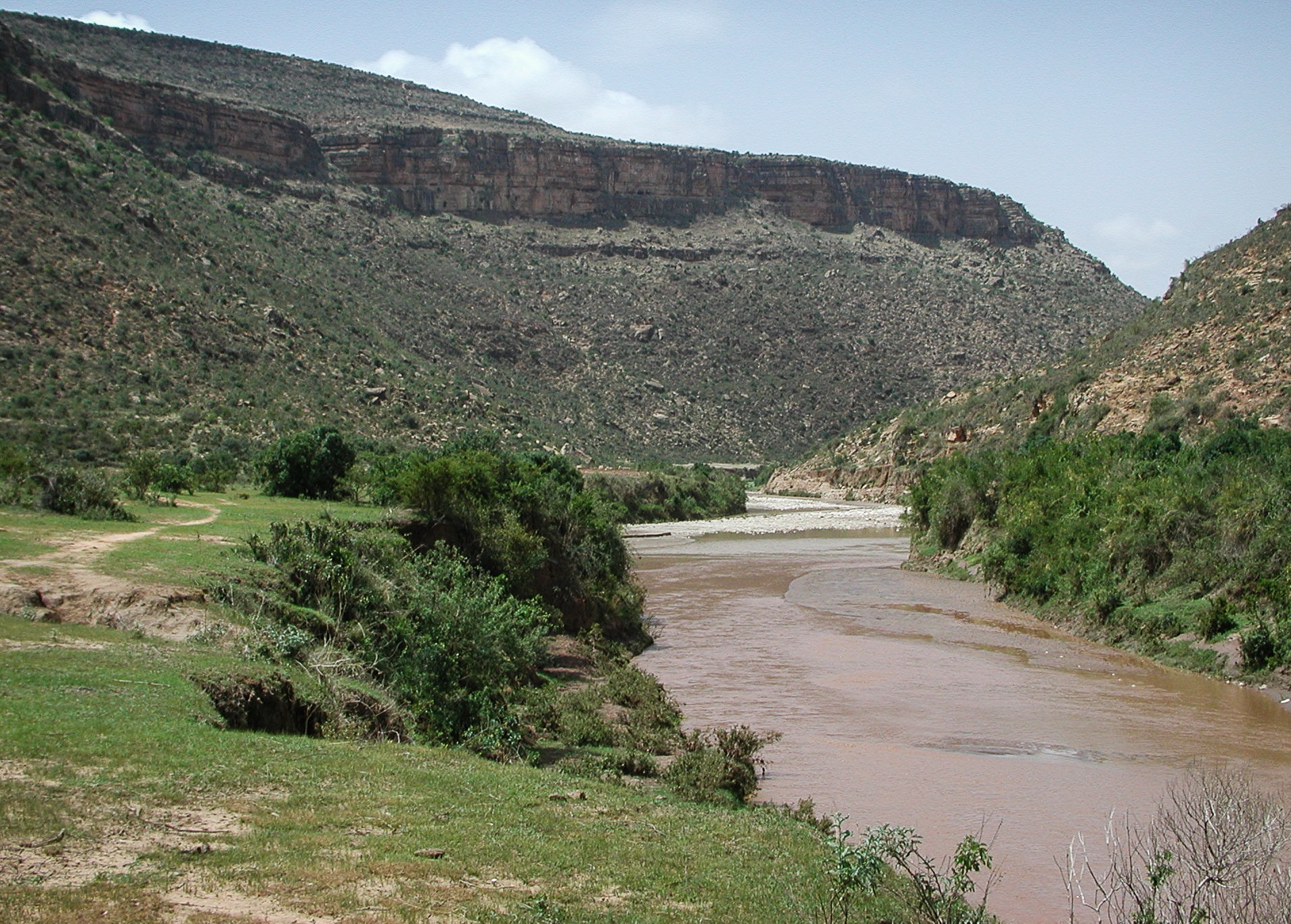
- Shugu'a Shugu'i confluence: Sulluh (from the back) and Genfel (from right) together form Giba River, flowing towards the photographer

- Sulluh River in Tigray Region

Location
- Country: Ethiopia
- Region: Tigray Region
- Districts (woreda): Dogu’a Tembien, Kilte Awula’ilo, Hawzen

Physical characteristics
- Source
  - location: Slopes of Mugulat mountains
  - elevation: 2,746 m (9,009 ft)
- Mouth: Giba River
  - location: Shugu'a Shugu'i
  - coordinates: 13.648°N 39.415°E
  - elevation: 1,770 m (5,810 ft)
- Length: 87 km (54 mi)
- Basin size: 969 km^{2} (374 mi^{2})
- Width
  - average: 35 m (115 ft)
- Discharge
  - location: Near the confluence at Shugu'a Shugu'i
  - maximum: 338 m^{3}/s (11,900 cu ft/s)

Basin features
- Progression: Giba→ Tekezé→ Atbarah→ Nile→ Mediterranean Sea
- River system: Permanent river
- Waterbodies: Addi Abagiè and many other reservoirs
- Bridges: Road Hawzien-Senkata
- Topography: Mountains and deep gorges

The Sulluh is a river of northern Ethiopia. Rising in the mountains of Mugulat (3,298 metres (10,820 ft) above sea level), it flows southward to Giba River which empties finally in the Tekezé River. Future Lake Giba will occupy the plain where Sulluh, Genfel and Agula'i Rivers meet.

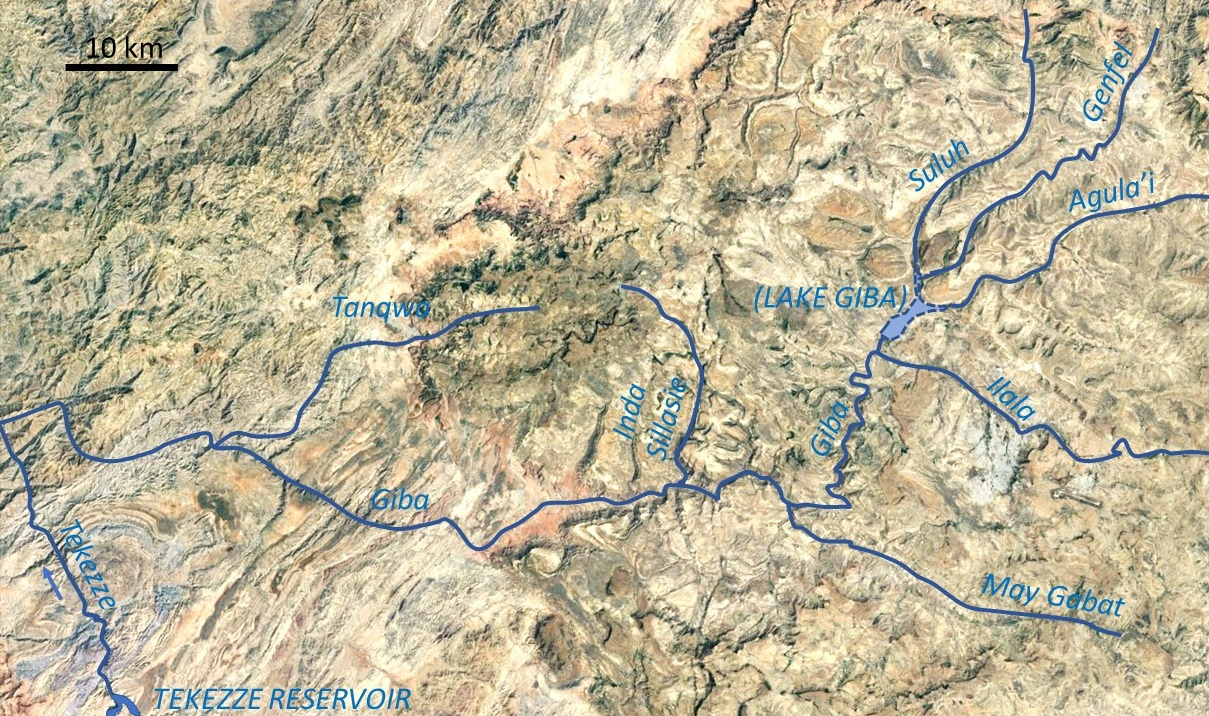
Giba drainage network

== Hydrography ==
It is a confined river, locally meandering in its narrow alluvial plain, with a slope gradient of 11 metres per kilometre (58 ft/mi). With its tributaries, the river has cut a deep gorge.

== Hydrology ==
=== Hydrological characteristics ===
The runoff footprint or annual total runoff volume is 133,000,000 cubic metres (4.7×10^{9} cu ft). Peak discharges up to 338 cubic metres per second (720,000 cu ft/min) occur in the second part of the rainy season (month of August) when there are strong rains and the soils are saturated with water in many places. The percentage of total rainfall that directly leaves the catchment as storm runoff (also called runoff coefficient) is 13%. The total amount of sediment that is transported by this river amounts to 614,000 tonnes (604,000 long tons; 677,000 short tons) per year. Median sediment concentration in the river water is 2.93 grams per litre (0.470 oz/imp gal) but may go up to 43 grams per litre (6.9 oz/imp gal). The highest sediment concentrations occur at the beginning of the rainy season, when loose soil and dust is washed away by overland flow and ends up in the river. As such water contains many nutrients (locally it is called "aygi"), farmers estimate that it strengthens their cattle, which they will bring to the river. All in all, average sediment yield is 890 tonnes per square kilometre (2,300 long ton/sq mi) and per year. All measurements were done at a purposively installed station near the mouth of the river, in the years 2004–2007.

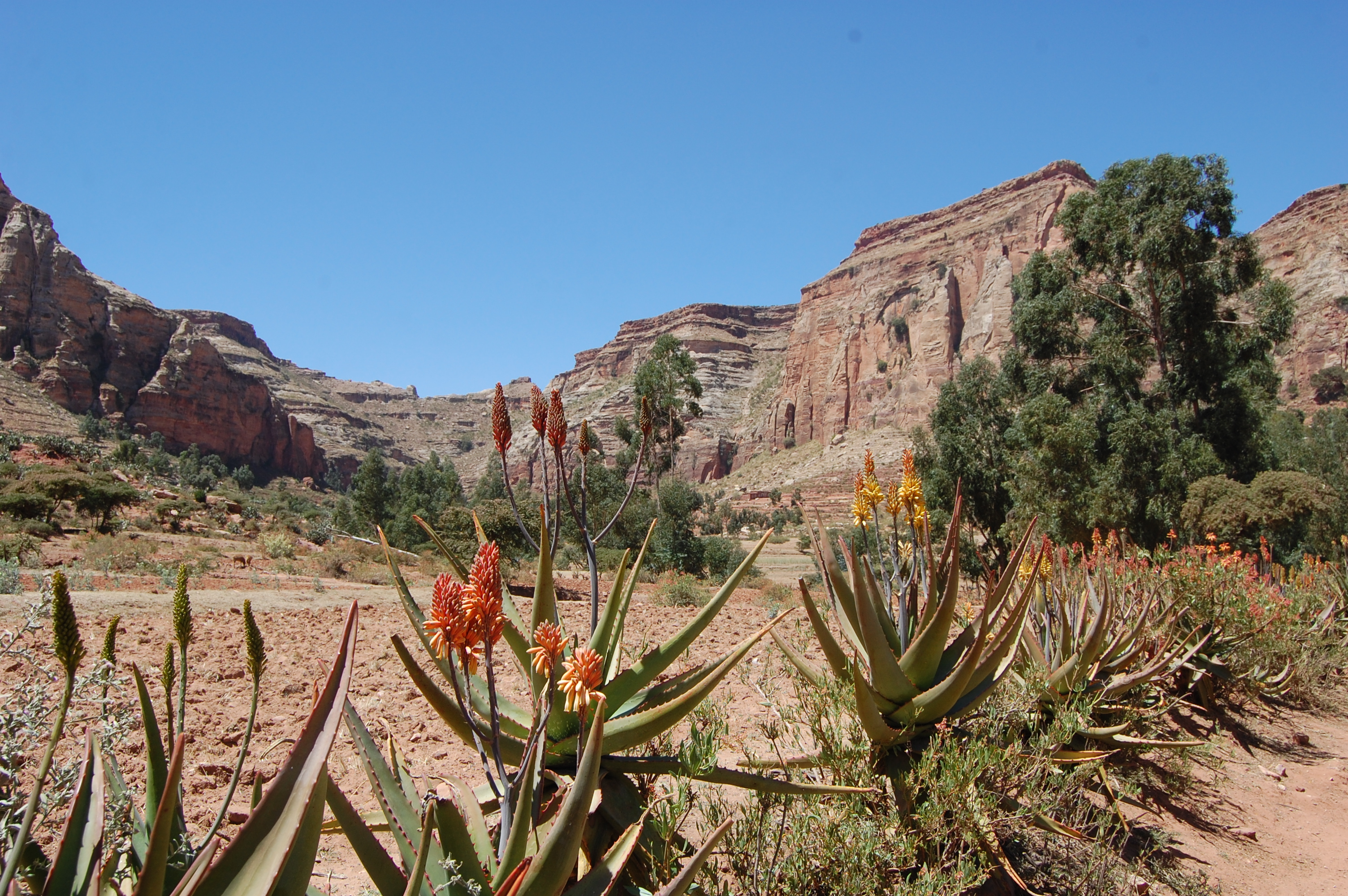
Upper Sulluh catchment

=== Flash floods ===
Runoff mostly occurs in the form of high runoff discharge events that occur in a very short period (called flash floods). These are related to the steep topography, often little vegetation cover and intense convective rainfall. The peaks of such flash floods have often a 50 to 100 times larger discharge than the preceding baseflow. These flash floods mostly occur during the evening or night, because the convective rain showers occur in the afternoon.

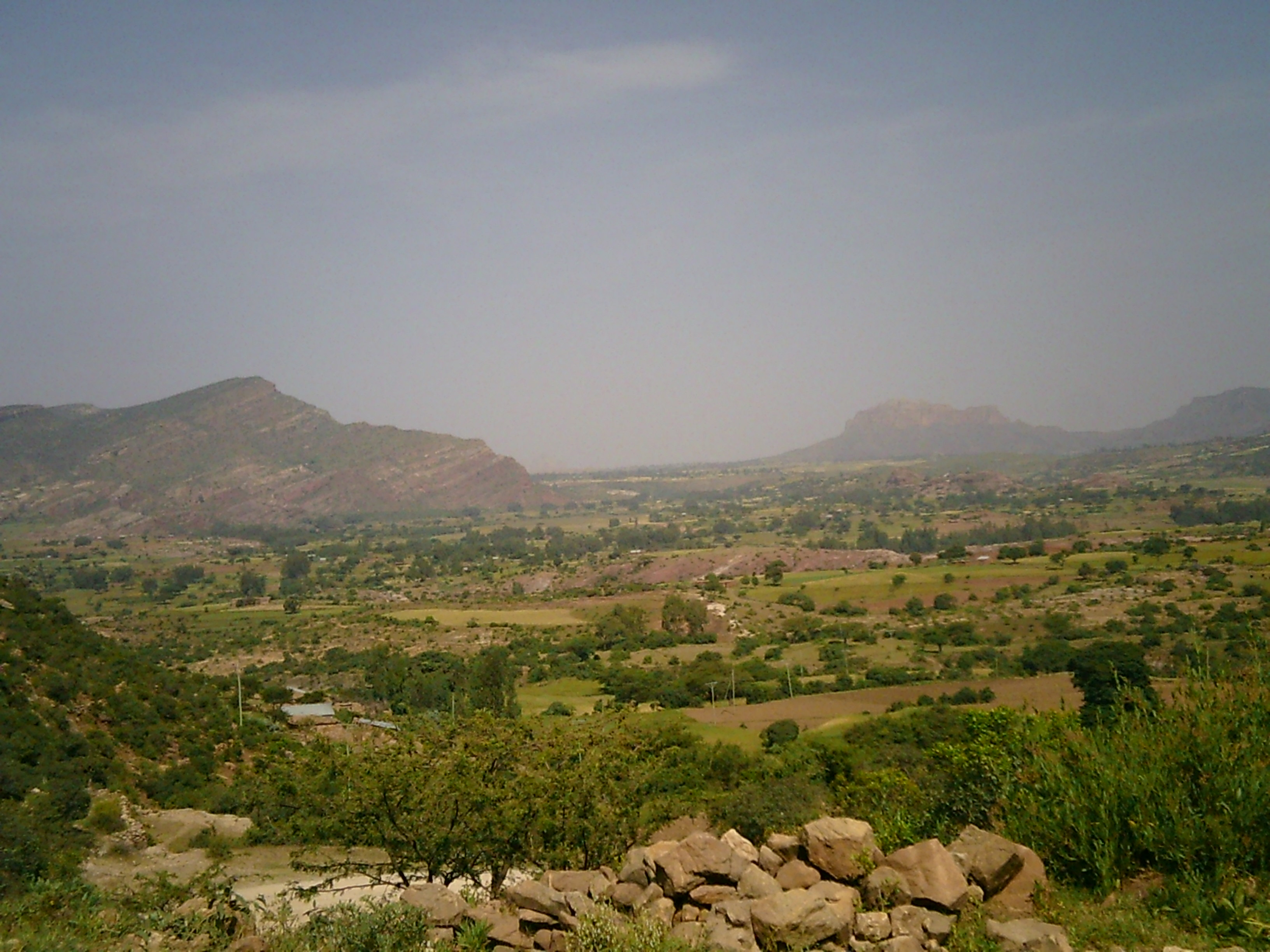
Middle Sulluh catchment

=== Changes over time ===
Evidence given by Italian aerial photographs of the catchment, taken in the 1930s show that 37% of the catchment was covered with woody vegetation (against 40% in 2014). This vegetation, and particularly the newly built conservation structures slow down runoff and impacts the runoff coefficient (9% in 1935 against 13% in 2014). As a consequence, discharges in the river were less than today. Up to the 1980s, there was strong pressure on the environment, and much vegetation disappeared. This river had its greatest discharges and width in that period. The magnitude of floods in this river has however been decreased in recent years due to interventions in the catchment. On other steep slopes, exclosures have been established; the dense vegetation largely contributes to enhanced infiltration, less flooding and better baseflow. Physical conservation structures such as stone bunds and check dams also intercept runoff.

== Irrigated agriculture ==
Besides springs and reservoirs, irrigation is strongly dependent on the river’s baseflow. Such irrigated agriculture is important in meeting the demands for food security and poverty reduction. Irrigated lands are established in the narrow alluvial plains along the river in several places.

== Transhumance towards the river gorge ==
The valley bottoms in the lower gorge of this river have been identified as a transhumance destination zone. Transhumance takes place in the summer rainy season, when the lands near the villages are occupied by crops. Young shepherds will take the village cattle down to the gorge and overnight in small caves. The gorges are particularly attractive as a transhumance destination zone, because there is water and good growth of semi-natural vegetation.

== Boulders and pebbles in the river bed ==
Boulders and pebbles encountered in the river bed can originate from any location higher up in the catchment. In the uppermost stretches of the river, only rock fragments of the upper lithological units will be present in the river bed, whereas more downstream one may find a more comprehensive mix of all lithologies crossed by the river. From upstream to downstream, the following lithological units occur in the catchment.

- Upper basalt
- Interbedded lacustrine deposits
- Lower basalt
- Adigrat Sandstone
- Edaga Arbi Glacials
- Antalo Limestone
- Quaternary freshwater tufa

== Trekking along the river ==
Trekking routes have been established across and along this river. The tracks are not marked on the ground but can be followed using downloaded .GPX files. Trek 23 also allows visiting the confluence of Sulluh and Genfel at Shugu'a Shugu'i. In the rainy season, flash floods may occur and it is advised not to follow the river bed. Frequently, it is then also impossible to wade across the river.

== See also ==
- List of Ethiopian rivers
