= Maimekden =

Village in Ethiopia

Maimekden May Mekden, Maymagden, Macden, Mai Macdem, M. Makdam, M. Mäqdäm
- Village
- Location within Ethiopia
- Coordinates: 13°35′N 39°34′E
- Country: Ethiopia
- Region: Tigray
- Zone: Debub Misraqawi (Southeastern)
- Woreda: Kilte Awulaelo
- Elevation: 2,208 m (7,244 ft)
- Time zone: UTC+3 (EAT)

Maimekden (or May Mekden) is a village in Tigray Region, located 27 kilometers south of Wukro. It is located on the crossing of Ethiopian Highway 2 and the Mai Mekden river.

== Administrative division ==
In Imperial times, Maimekden used to be the administrative center of the Wenberta woreda, part of the Enderta Province. Nowadays, the new Wenberta district has its center in the town of Atsbi and Maimekden is located in the Kilte Awulaelo district with Wukro as its administrative center.
