= Genfel =

River in the Tigray highlands of Ethiopia

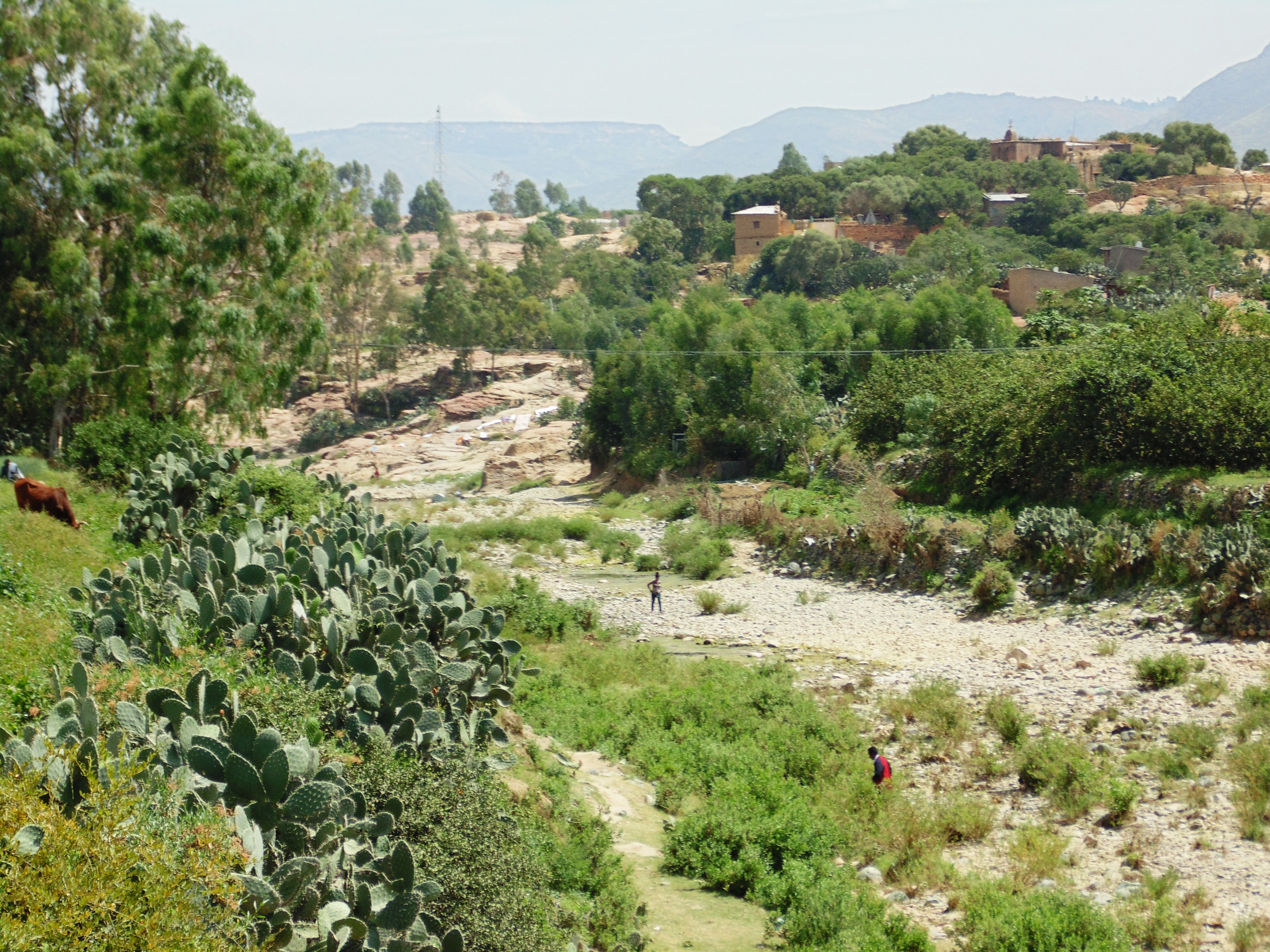

- Genfel River in Tigray Region

Location
- Country: Ethiopia
- Region: Tigray Region
- Districts (woreda): Kilte Awula’ilo, Atsbi Wenberta

Physical characteristics
- Source
  - location: North of Wukro
  - elevation: 2,253 m (7,392 ft)
- Mouth: Giba River
  - location: Shugu'a Shugu'i
  - coordinates: 13.647°N 39.415°E
  - elevation: 1,770 m (5,810 ft)
- Length: 51 km (32 mi)
- Basin size: 969 km^{2} (374 mi^{2})
- Width
  - average: 30 m (98 ft)
- Discharge
  - location: Near the outlet at Shugu'a Shugu'i
  - maximum: 300 m^{3}/s (11,000 cu ft/s)

Basin features
- Progression: Giba→ Tekezé→ Atbarah→ Nile→ Mediterranean Sea
- River system: Permanent river
- Landmarks: Wukro town
- Waterbodies: Gereb May Zib'i, La’ilay Wukro and future Lake Giba reservoirs
- Waterfalls: Rapids
- Bridges: Wukro
- Topography: Mountains and deep gorges

The Genfel is a river of northern Ethiopia. Rising on the foot of the Atsbi horst at 2,253 metres above sea level, it flows southwestward to Giba River which empties finally in the Tekezé River. Future Lake Giba will occupy the plain where Sulluh, Genfel and Agula'i Rivers meet.

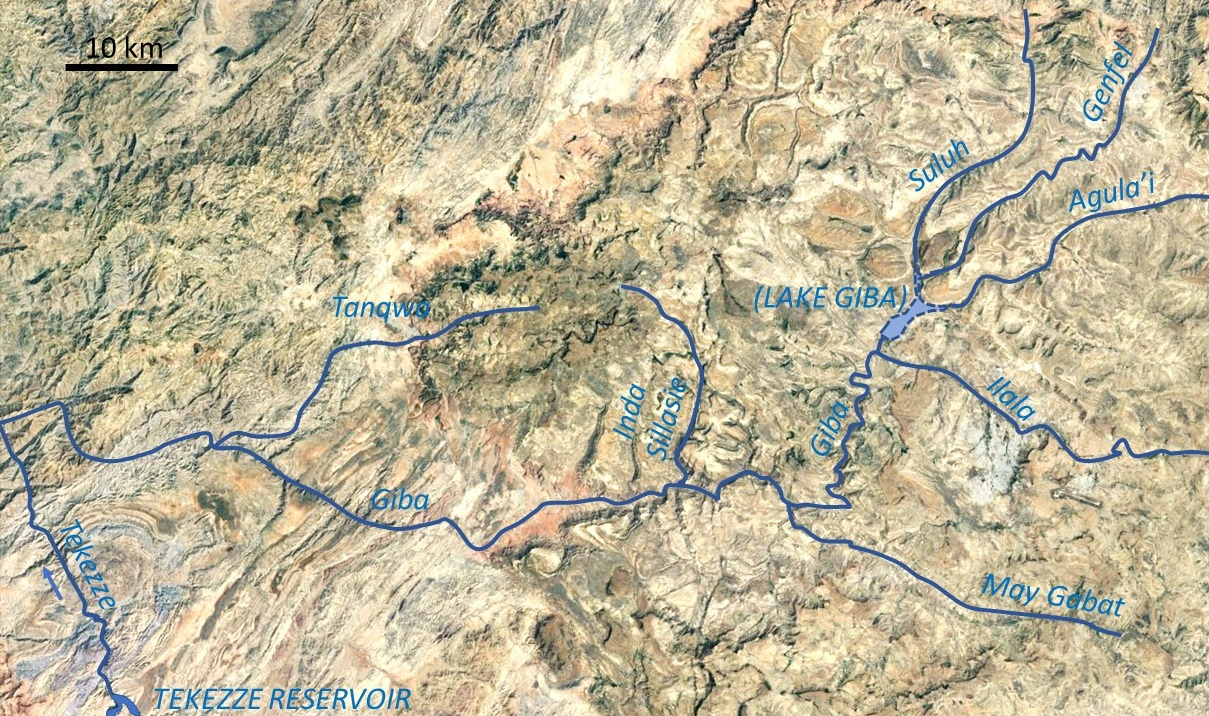
Giba drainage network

== Hydrography ==
It is a confined river, locally meandering in its narrow alluvial plain, with a slope gradient of 9 metres per kilometre. With its tributaries, the river has cut a deep gorge.

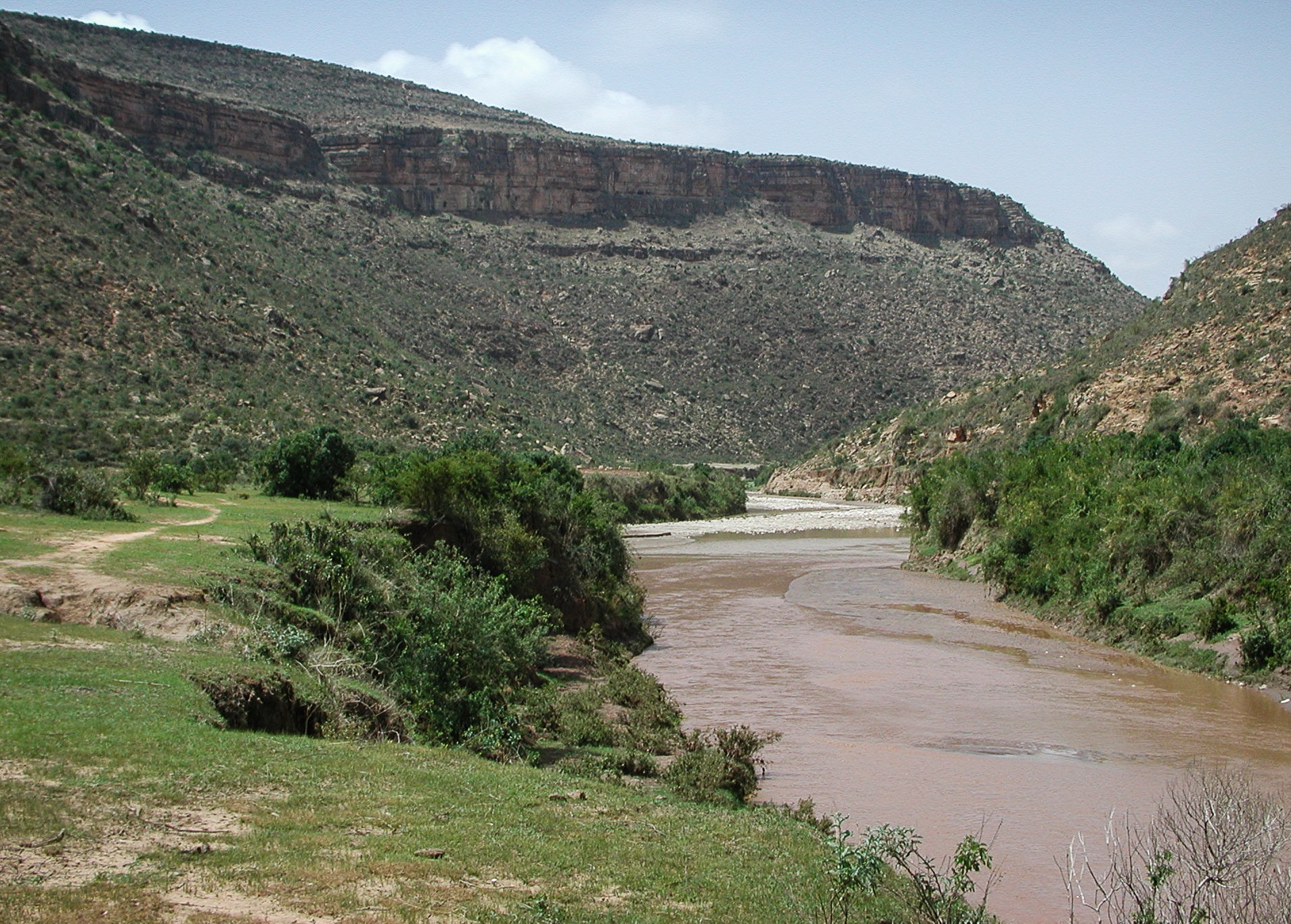
Shugu'a Shugu'i confluence: Sulluh (from the back) and Genfel (from right) together form Giba River, flowing towards the photographer

== Hydrology ==
=== Hydrological characteristics ===
The runoff footprint or annual total runoff volume is 76 million m^{3}. Peak discharges up to 300 m^{3} per second occur in the second part of the rainy season (month of August) when there are strong rains and the soils are saturated with water in many places. The percentage of total rainfall that directly leaves the catchment as storm runoff (also called runoff coefficient) is 12%. The total amount of sediment that is transported by this river amounts to 274,000 tonnes per year. Median sediment concentration in the river water is 1.66 grammes per litre, but may go up to 40 g/L. The highest sediment concentrations occur at the beginning of the rainy season, when loose soil and dust is washed away by overland flow and ends up in the river. As such water contains many nutrients (locally it is called "aygi"), farmers estimate that it strengthens their cattle, which they will bring to the river. All in all, average sediment yield is 497 tonnes per km^{2} and per year. All measurements were done at a purposively installed station near the mouth of the river, in the year 2006.

=== Flash floods ===
Runoff mostly occurs in the form of high runoff discharge events that occur in a very short period (called flash floods). These are related to the steep topography, often little vegetation cover and intense convective rainfall. The peaks of such flash floods have often a 50 to 100 times larger discharge than the preceding baseflow. These flash floods mostly occur during the evening or night, because the convective rain showers occur in the afternoon.

=== Changes over time ===
Evidence given by Italian aerial photographs of the catchment, taken in the 1930s show that 40% of the catchment was covered with woody vegetation (against 34% in 2014). This vegetation could slow down runoff and the runoff coefficient was smaller (11% in 1935 against 12% in 2014). As a consequence, discharges in the river were less than today. Up to the 1980s, there was strong pressure on the environment, and much vegetation disappeared. This river had its greatest discharges and width in that period. The magnitude of floods in this river has however been decreased in recent years due to interventions in the catchment. On steep slopes, exclosures have been established; the dense vegetation largely contributes to enhanced infiltration, less flooding and better baseflow. Physical conservation structures such as stone bunds and check dams also intercept runoff.

== Irrigated agriculture ==
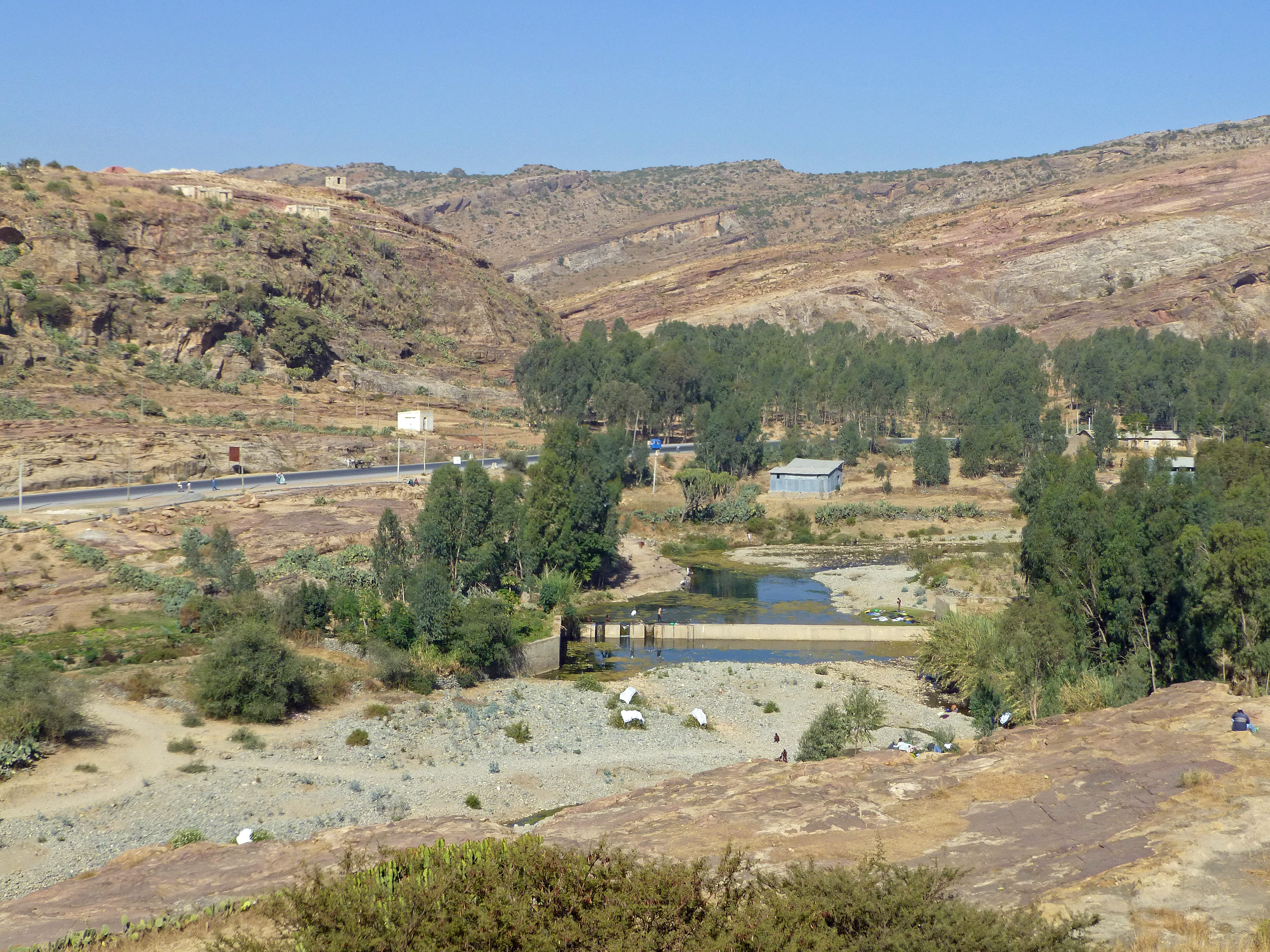
Diversion dam on Genfel for irrigation near Wukro

Besides springs and reservoirs, irrigation is strongly dependent on the river's baseflow. Such irrigated agriculture is important in meeting the demands for food security and poverty reduction. Irrigated lands are established in the narrow alluvial plains along the river, particularly up- and downstream of Wukro.

== Transhumance towards the river gorge ==
The valley bottoms in the lower gorge of this river have been identified as a transhumance destination zone. Transhumance takes place in the summer rainy season, when the lands near the villages are occupied by crops. Young shepherds will take the village cattle down to the gorge and overnight in small caves. The gorges are particularly attractive as a transhumance destination zone, because there is water and good growth of semi-natural vegetation.

== Boulders and pebbles in the river bed ==
Boulders and pebbles encountered in the river bed can originate from any location higher up in the catchment. In the uppermost stretches of the river, only rock fragments of the upper lithological units will be present in the river bed, whereas more downstream one may find a more comprehensive mix of all lithologies crossed by the river. From upstream to downstream, the following lithological units occur in the catchment.

- Enticho Sandstone
- Antalo Limestone
- Mekelle Dolerite
- Quaternary freshwater tufa

== Trekking along the river ==
Trekking routes have been established across and along this river. The tracks are not marked on the ground but can be followed using downloaded .GPX files. Trek A follows the lower course near Shugu'a Shugu'i, and then the southern edge of the Genfel gorge. Trek 23 also allows visiting the confluence of Sulluh and Genfel at Shugu'a Shugu'i. In the rainy season, flash floods may occur and it is advised not to follow the river bed. Frequently, it is then also impossible to wade across the river.

== See also ==
- List of Ethiopian rivers
