= Emni Ankelalu =

Municipality in Ethiopia

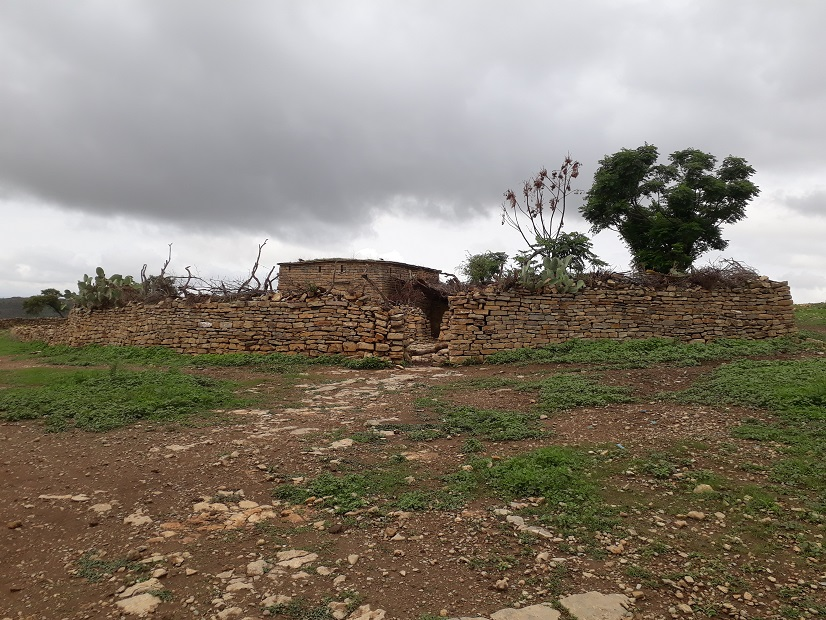
- A homestead in Emni Ankelalu

- Location within Ethiopia
- Coordinates: 13°39′N 39°22′E
- Country: Ethiopia
- Region: Tigray
- Zone: Debub Misraqawi (Southeastern)
- Woreda: Dogu'a Tembien

Area
  - Land: 40.04 km^{2} (15.46 sq mi)
- Elevation: 2,020 m (6,630 ft)
- Time zone: UTC+3 (EAT)

Emni Ankelalu is a tabia or municipality in the Dogu'a Tembien district of the Tigray Region of Ethiopia. The tabia centre is in Mitslal Afras village, located approximately 20 km to the east of the woreda town Hagere Selam.

== Geography ==
The tabia a hilly limestone area, along Giba River, north and away from the main road. The highest peak is Miqmat' Awra hill that occupies the centre (2195 m a.s.l.) and the lowest place at the outlet of May Qarano to Giba river (1750 m a.s.l.).

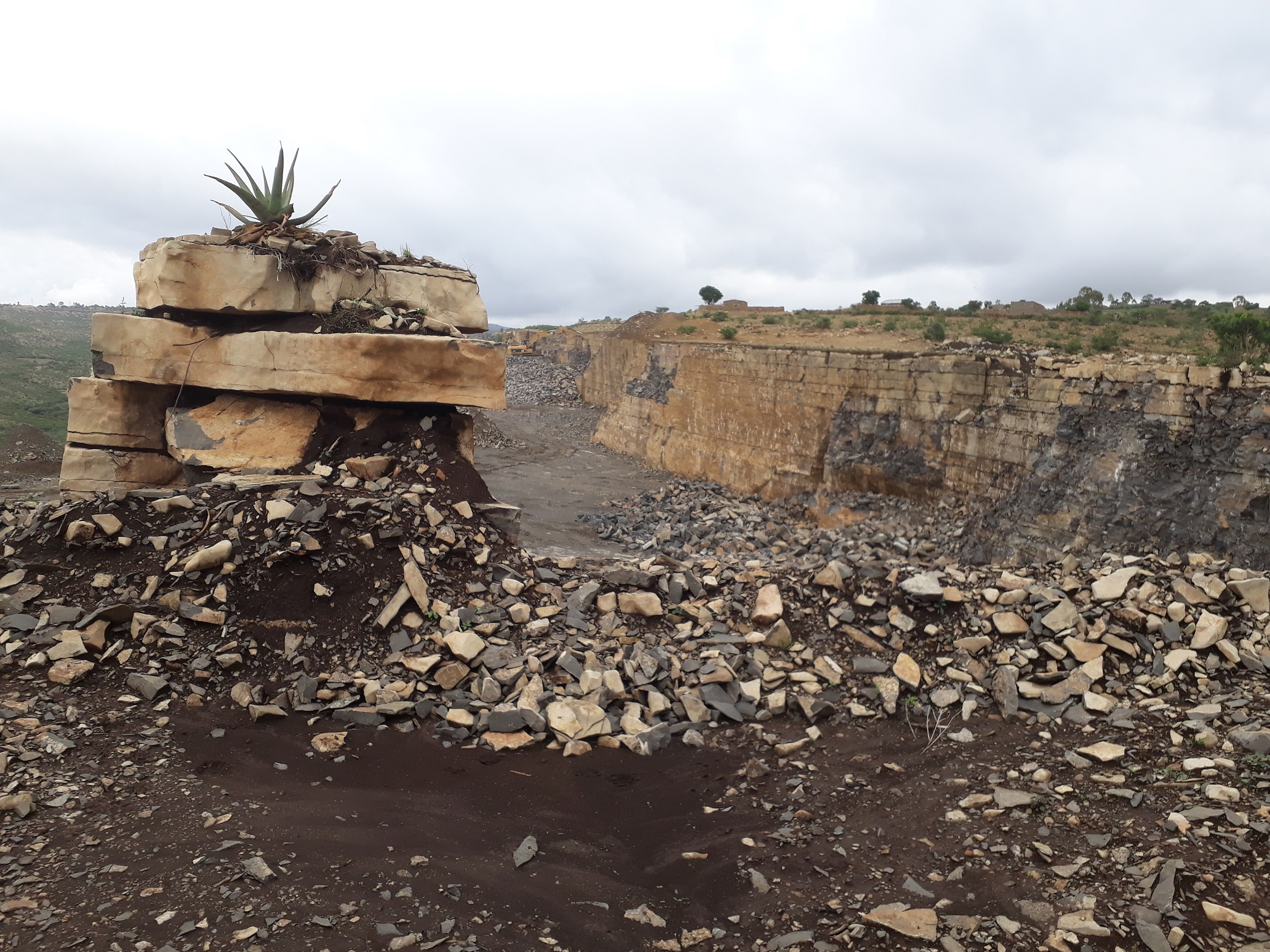
Quarry in Antalo Limestone at the lower, southern border of Emni Ankelalu

=== Geology ===
The following geological formations are present:

- Mekelle Dolerite
- Antalo Limestone totally dominates the landscape
- Quaternary alluvium and freshwater tufa

=== Geomorphology and soils ===
The main geomorphic unit is the gently undulating Agula shale plateau with dolerite. Corresponding soil types are:

- Dominant soil type: stony, dark cracking clays with good natural fertility (Vertic Cambisol)
- Associated soil types
  - rock outcrops, stony and shallow soils (Lithic Leptosol)
  - red-brownish loamy soils with good natural fertility (Chromic Luvisol)
- Inclusions
  - deep, dark cracking clays on calcaric material with good fertility but poor drainage (Vertisol)

=== Climate ===
The rainfall pattern shows a very high seasonality with 70 to 80% of the annual rain falling in July and August. Mean temperature in Mitslal Afras is 20.8 °C, oscillating between average daily minimum of 12.4 °C and maximum of 30.8 °C. The contrasts between day and night air temperatures are much larger than seasonal contrasts.

=== Hydrology ===
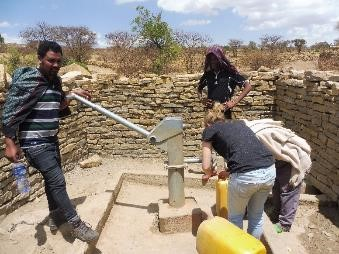
Mitslal Afras hand pump

In this area with rains that last only for a couple of months per year, the only permanent water is in Giba river. There are hardly any springs. Hence, reservoirs of different sizes allow harvesting runoff from the rainy season for further use in the dry season. There are traditional surface water harvesting ponds, particularly in places without permanent springs, called rahaya, and also horoyo, household ponds, recently constructed through campaigns.

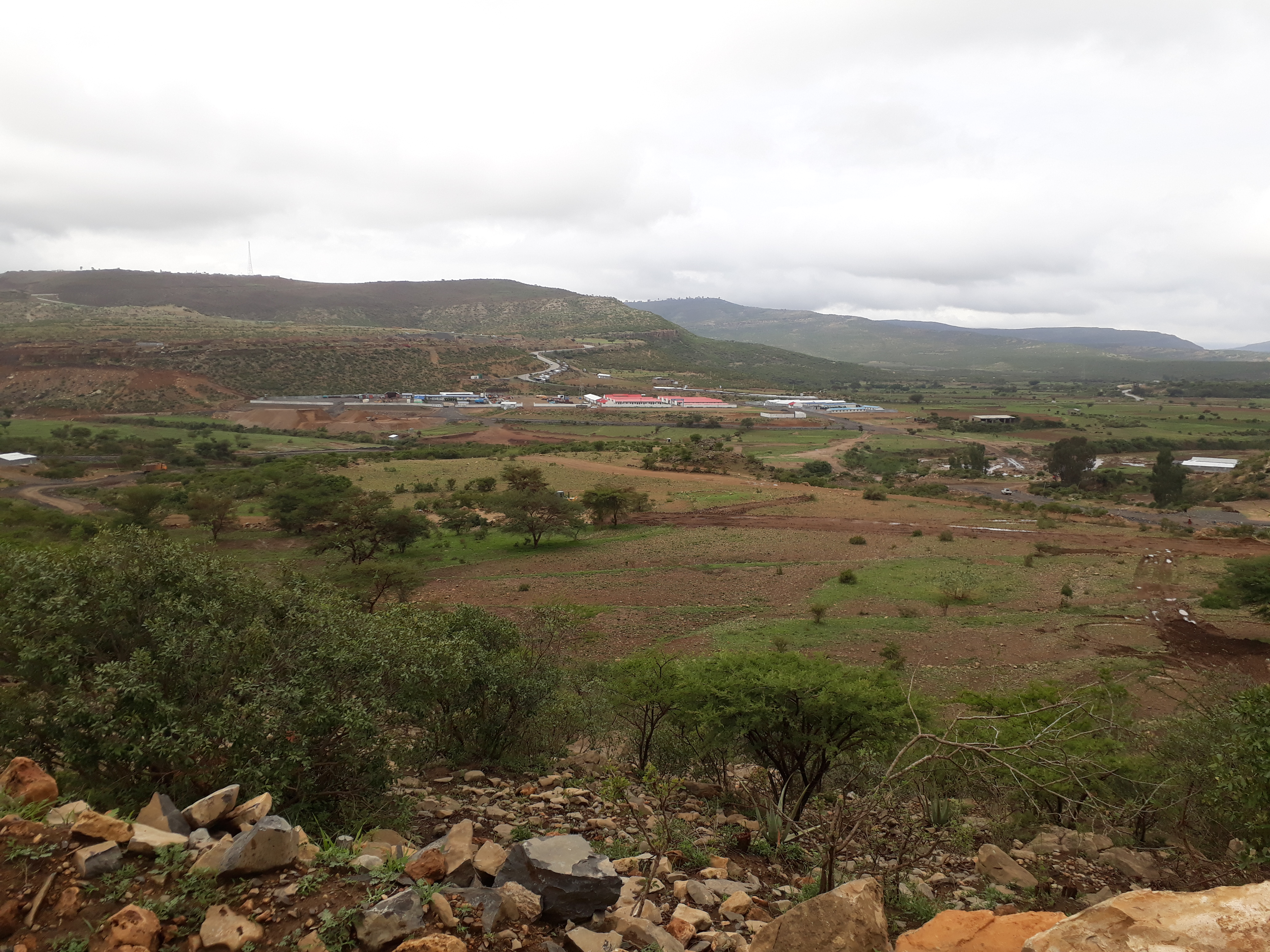
Giba dam building site in 2019

A major change is the construction of Lake Giba, a 350 million m^{3} reservoir on the Giba river that will occupy the whole lower eastern side of the tabia. The reservoir is mainly intended to provide water to Mekelle. The lithology of the dam building site is Antalo Limestone. Part of its water is anticipated to be lost through seepage; the positive side-effect is that this will contribute to groundwater recharge and river baseflow in the downstream areas, which largely belong to tabias Addi Azmera and Debre Nazret. The lower villages of Emni Ankelalu will see their environment changed from dryland to lakeshore villages.

=== Settlements ===
The tabia centre Mitslal Afras holds a few administrative offices, a health post, a primary school, and some small shops. There are a few more primary schools across the tabia. The main other populated places are:

- Addi Ateroman
- Worgesha

- Kurji
- Miqmat' Awra

== Agriculture and livelihood ==
The population lives essentially from crop farming, supplemented with off-season work in nearby towns. The land is dominated by farmlands which are clearly demarcated and are cropped every year. Hence the agricultural system is a permanent upland farming system. The farmers have adapted their cropping systems to the spatio-temporal variability in rainfall.

== History and culture ==
=== History ===
The history of the tabia is strongly confounded with the history of Tembien.

=== Religion and churches ===
Most inhabitants are Orthodox Christians. The following churches are located in the tabia:

- Kidane Mihret
- Miqmat'Awra Maryam

=== Inda Siwa, the local beer houses ===
In the main villages, there are traditional beer houses (Inda Siwa), often in unique settings, which are a good place for resting and chatting with the local people. Most renown in the tabia is Kndahafti Mezegebe's inn at Mitslal Afras.

== Roads and communication ==
The main road Mekelle – Hagere Selam – Abiy Addi runs some kilometres south of the tabia.

== Schools ==
Almost all children of the tabia are schooled, though in some schools there is lack of classrooms, directly related to the large intake in primary schools over the last decades. Schools in the tabia include Mitslal Afras school.

== Tourism ==
Its mountainous nature and proximity to Mekelle makes the tabia fit for tourism.

=== Touristic attraction ===
- Lake Giba

=== Geotouristic sites ===
The high variability of geological formations and the rugged topography invites for geological and geographic tourism or "geotourism". Geosites in the tabia include:

- Confluence of Sulluh and Genfel rivers, inside deep gorges, called "Shugu'a Shugu'i"
- May Qarano tufa dam (now occupied by the Giba dam building works)
- Exclosures
- Limestone landscape
- Limestone quarries

=== Birdwatching ===
Birdwatching (for the species, see the main Dogu'a Tembien page) can be done particularly in exclosures and forests. The following bird-watching sites have been inventoried in the tabia and mapped.

- Mitlal Afras church forest
- Miq'mat Awra church forest
- Slope forest west of Miq'mat Awra

=== Trekking route ===
Trekking route 24 has been established in this tabia. It follows the Giba and Suluh gorges upstream along the rivers, and then continues westbound over Miqmat' Awra hill. Once the Lake Giba will be filled, it will be impossible to visit these gorges. The track is not marked on the ground but can be followed using downloaded .GPX files.

=== Accommodation and facilities ===
The facilities are very basic. One may be invited to spend the night in a rural homestead or ask permission to pitch a tent. Hotels are available in Hagere Selam and Mekelle.

== More detailed information ==
For more details on environment, agriculture, rural sociology, hydrology, ecology, culture, etc., see the overall page on the Dogu'a Tembien district.
