= Qarano River =

River in the Tembien highlands of Ethiopia

Qarano
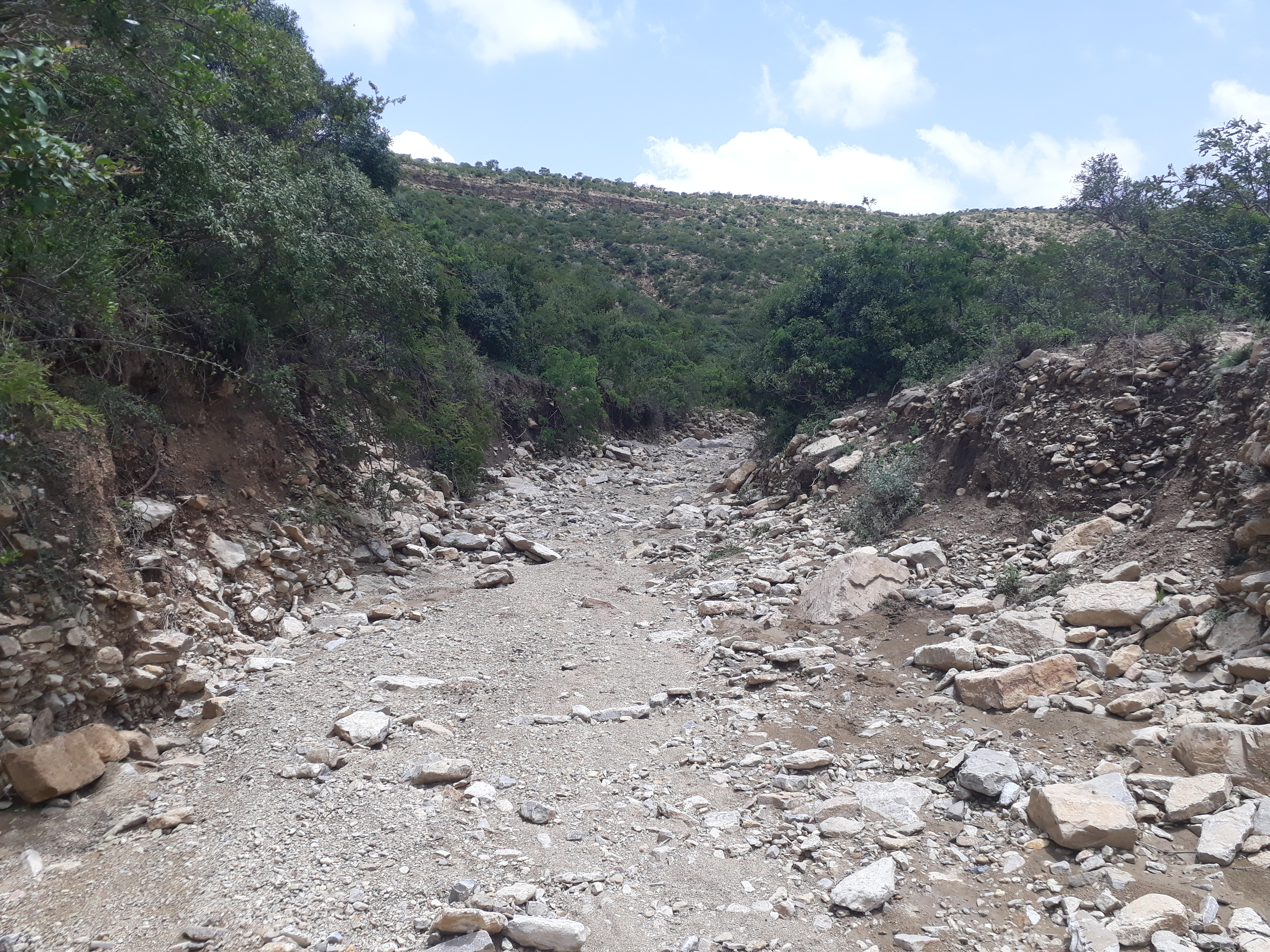
- The Qarano River at Mitslal Afras

- Qarano River in Dogu’a Tembien

Location
- Country: Ethiopia
- Region: Tigray Region
- District (woreda): Dogu’a Tembien

Physical characteristics
- Source: Addilal
  - elevation: 2,246 m (7,369 ft)
- Mouth: Giba River
  - location: May Qarano in Emni Ankelalu municipality
  - coordinates: 13.6094°N 39.3861°E
  - elevation: 1,753 m (5,751 ft)
- Length: 15.2 km (9.4 mi)
- Width
  - average: 7 m (23 ft)

Basin features
- Progression: Giba→ Tekezé→ Atbarah→ Nile→ Mediterranean Sea
- River system: Seasonal river
- Landmarks: Tufa dam at outlet
- Waterfalls: Near outlet
- Topography: Undulating, with minor cliffs

The Qarano is a river of the Nile basin. Rising in the mountains of Dogu’a Tembien in northern Ethiopia, it flows eastward to empty in the Giba and Tekezé River.

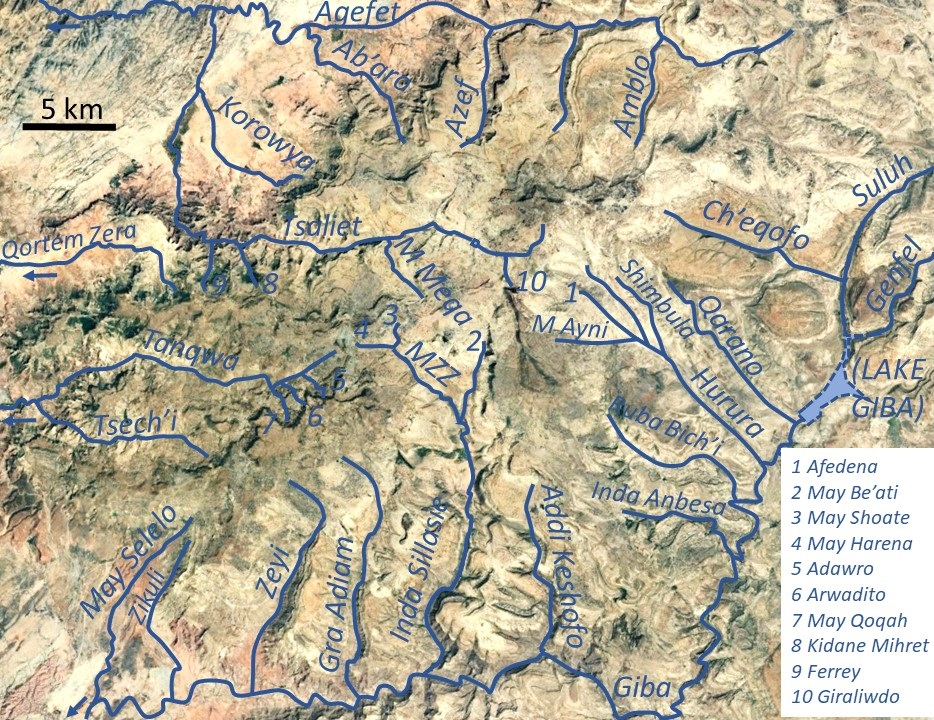
The river in the radial drainage network of Dogu’a Tembien

== Characteristics ==
The Qarano is a confined ephemeral river, locally meandering in its narrow alluvial plain, with an average slope gradient of 45 metres per kilometre. With its tributaries, the river has cut a deep gorge.

== Flash floods and flood buffering ==
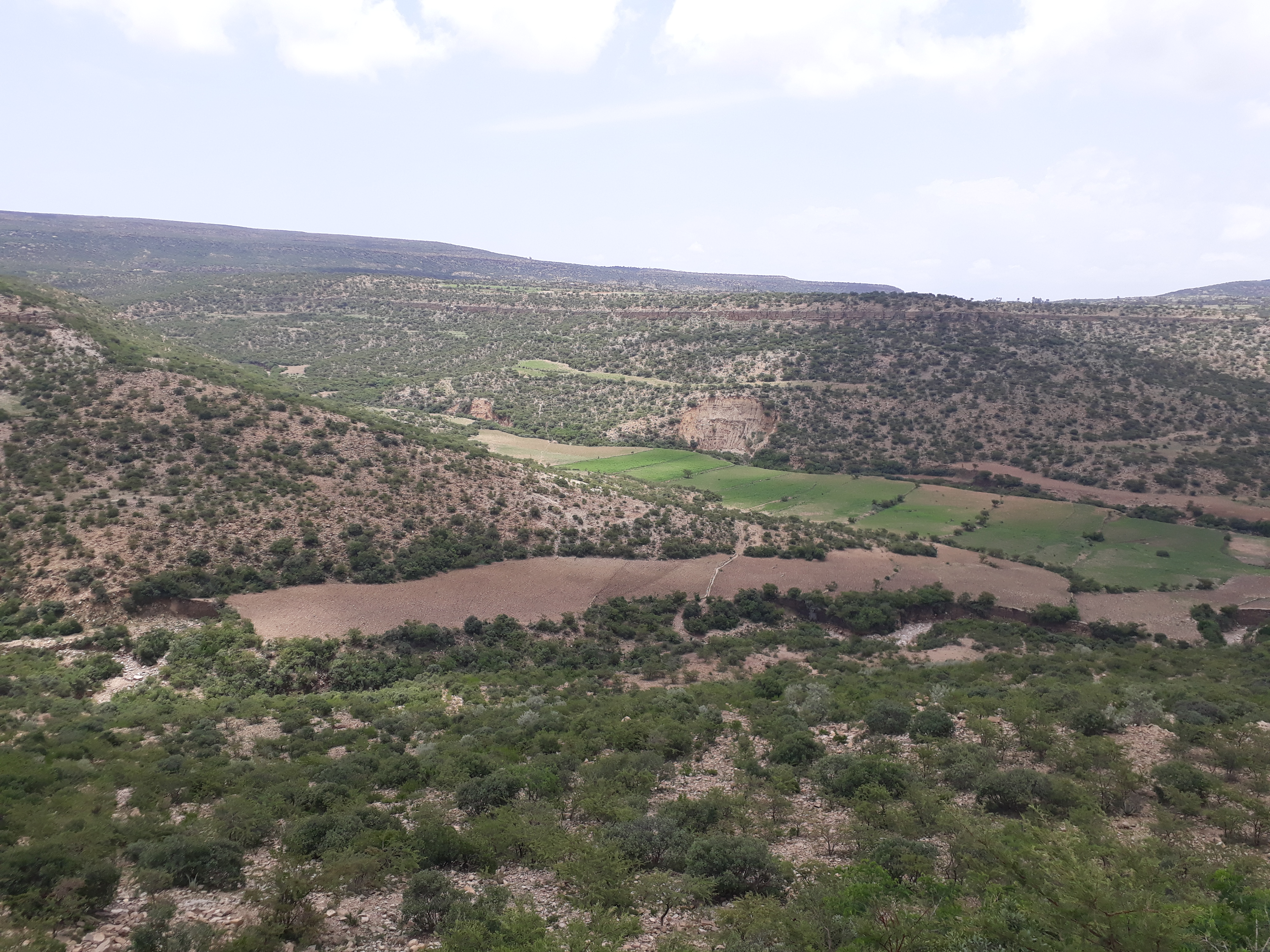
Qarano valley

Runoff mostly occurs in the form of high runoff discharge events that occur in a very short period (called flash floods). These are related to the steep topography, often little vegetation cover and intense convective rainfall. The peaks of such flash floods have often a 50 to 100 times larger discharge than the preceding baseflow. The magnitude of floods in this river has however been decreased due to interventions in the catchment.

At Addilal and on other steep slopes, exclosures have been established; the dense vegetation largely contributes to enhanced infiltration, less flooding and better baseflow. Physical conservation structures such as stone bunds and check dams intercept runoff.

== Boulders and pebbles in the river bed ==
Boulders and pebbles encountered in the Qarano river bed can originate from any location higher up in the catchment, and are either made of Antalo Limestone or freshwater tufa

== Natural boundary ==
During its course, this river passes through three municipalities and constitutes different borders. On the various parts:

- Addilal at the north
- Emni Ankelalu at the east
- Addi Azmera at the west and southwest

== Trekking along the river ==
Trekking routes have been established across and along this river. The tracks are not marked on the ground but can be followed using downloaded .GPX files.

- Trek 23, along the upper part of the river

In the rainy season, flash floods may occur and it is advised not to follow the river bed.

== See also ==
- List of Ethiopian rivers
