= Gereb May Zib'i =

Gereb May Zib’i
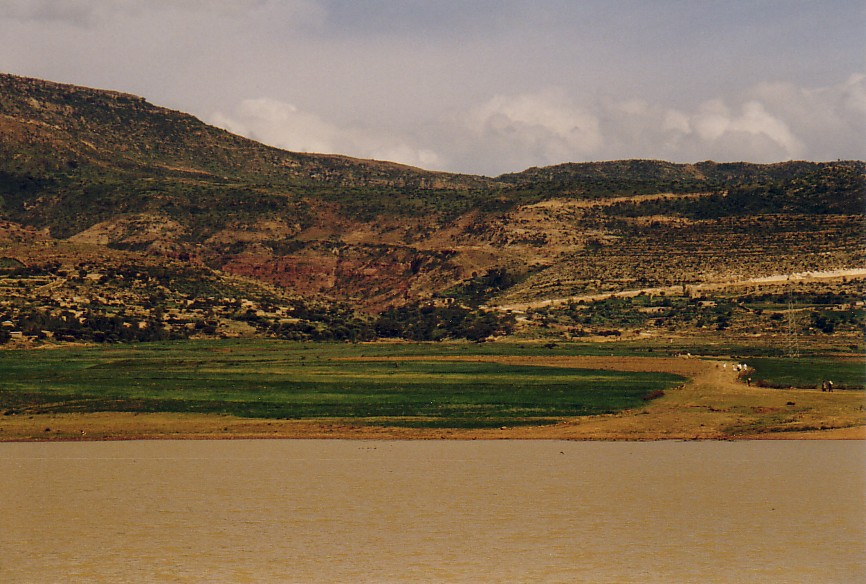

- Location within Ethiopia
- Coordinates: 13.78180799°N 39.60931392°E
- Type: Freshwater artificial lake
- Basin countries: Ethiopia
- Surface elevation: 2,000 m (6,600 ft)
- Settlements: Wukro

Gereb May Zib’i is a reservoir located in the Kilte Awula’ilo woreda of the Tigray Region in Ethiopia. The earthen dam that holds the reservoir was built by the Tigray Bureau of Agriculture and Natural Resources, for purpose of livestock watering and human water consumption.

== Environment ==
The catchment of the reservoir is 0.79 km^{2} large, with a perimeter of 3.93 km. The lithology of the catchment is Agula Shale and Antalo Limestone. Part of the water is lost through seepage; the positive side-effect is that this contributes to groundwater recharge.
