= Agula =

Town in Ethiopia

- Town
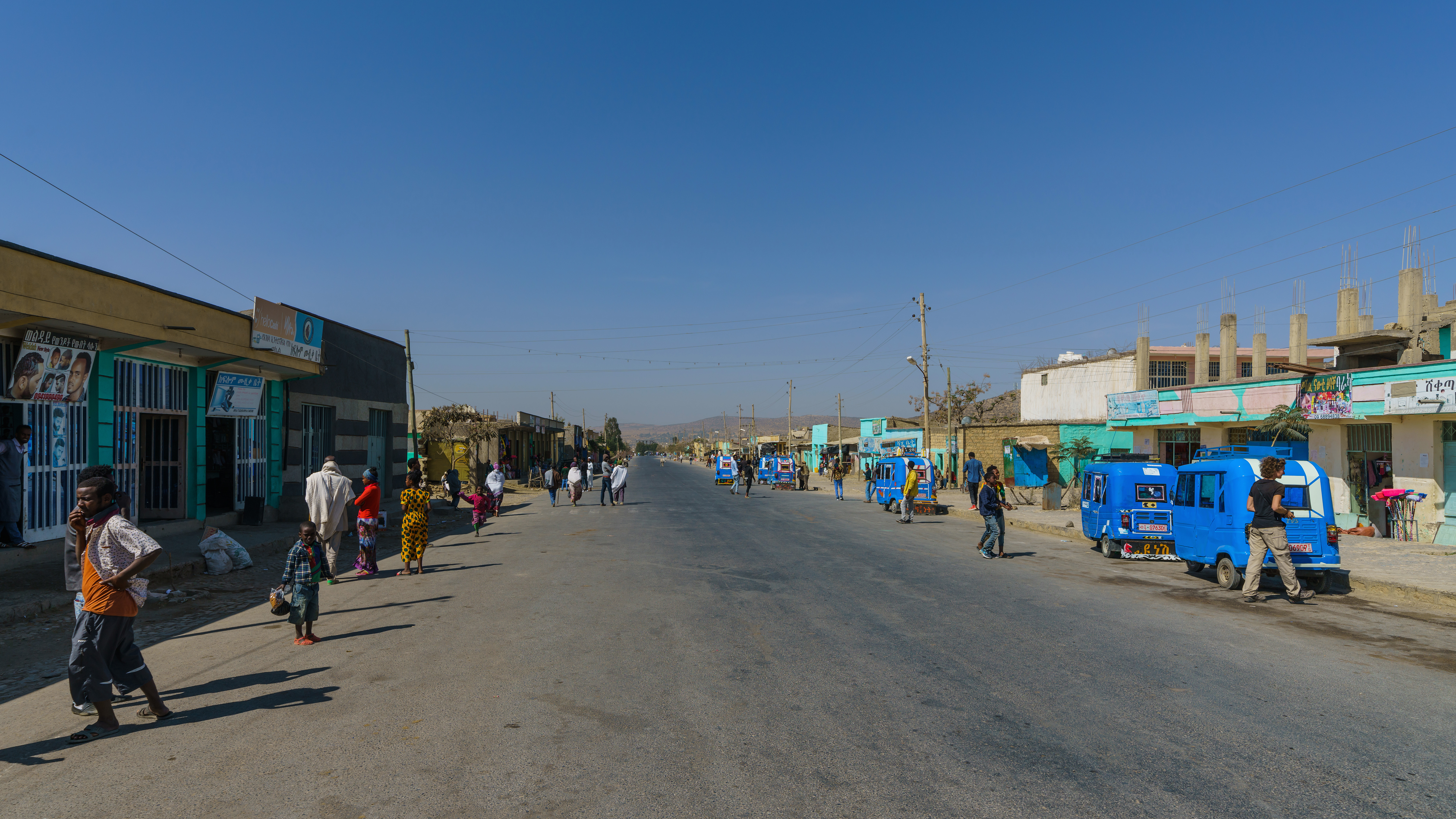

- Location within Ethiopia
- Coordinates: 13°41′30″N 39°35′30″E
- Country: Ethiopia
- Region: Tigray
- Zone: Misraqawi (Eastern)
- Woreda: Kilte Awulaelo
- Elevation: 1,930 m (6,330 ft)

Population (2005)
  - Total: 4,636
- Time zone: UTC+3 (EAT)

Agula is a town located in northern Ethiopia. Located in the Debubawi (Southern) Zone of the Tigray Region, it lies about 32 km northeast of Mekelle, just east of the Mekelle to Addis Ababa highway, and 25 km north of Qwiha. It has a latitude and longitude of 13°41′30″N 39°35′30″E with an elevation of 1,930 metres above sea level. It is one of three towns in Kilte Awulaelo woreda. Nearby is a stream and a pass (elevation 2,030 metres) which share the same name. Agula was an important station on the salt caravan route from Dallol west to Atsbi.

== History ==
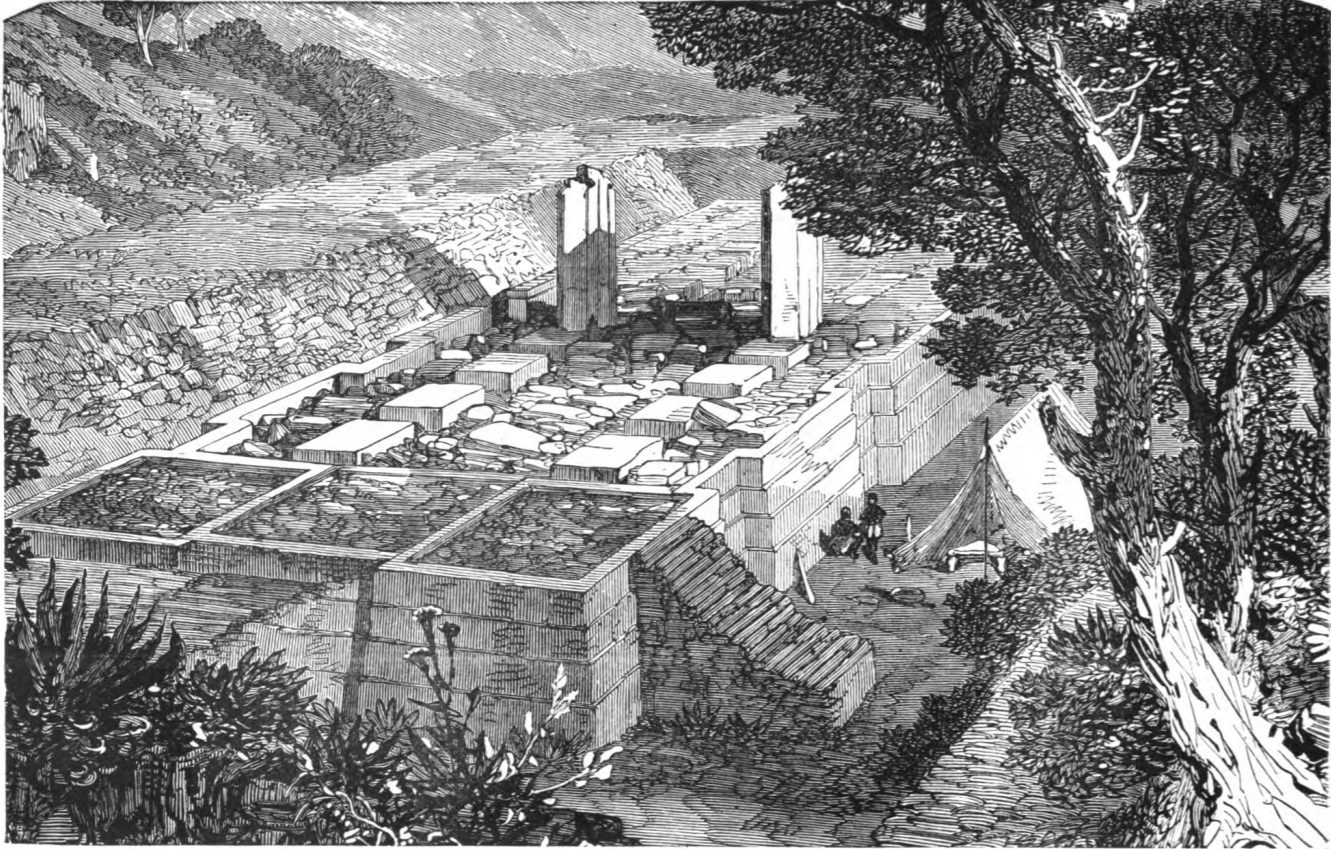
Old church at Agula visited by the 1868 expedition

Agula was visited by the Portuguese priest Francisco Álvares on 13 August 1520, who called it Anguguim. He mentions in the town "a well-built church — upon very thick stone supports; very well hewn" which was dedicated to Saint Chirqos. The town is mentioned again in an inquiry conducted by Emperor Iyasu I in 1698, in which he proclaimed that tolls should no longer be collected there. The village was visited in 1868 by members of the Napier Expedition, who found the church in ruins; they were told that the church had been reduced to its current state by treasure-seekers acting on the orders of Dejazmach Sabagadis. Based on the "limited information now recoverable", David Phillipson assigns the construction of this church a "Late Aksumite or, perhaps, a subsequent date".

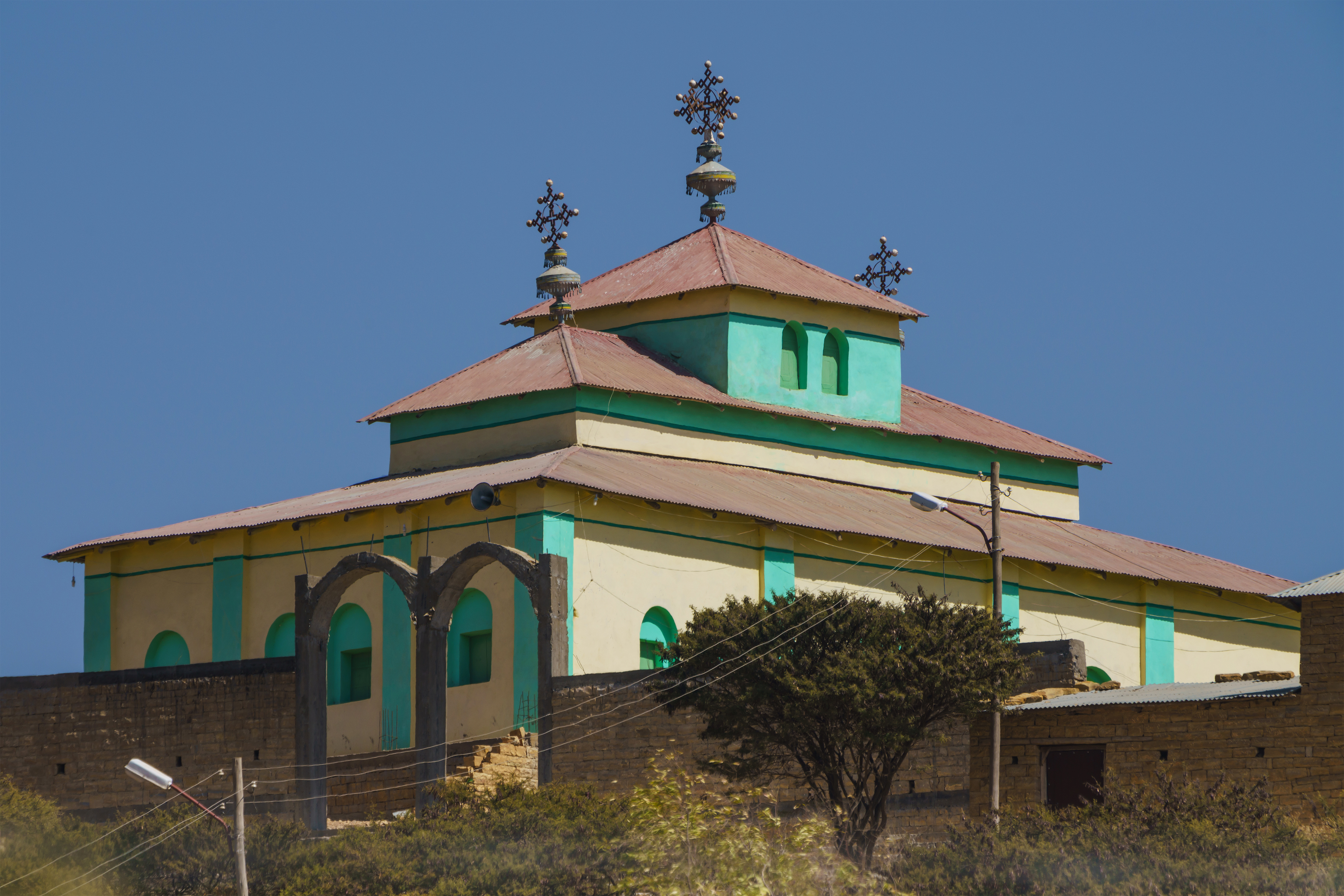
Ethiopian Orthodox Tewahedo Church in Agula.

== Demographics ==
Based on figures from the Central Statistical Agency of Ethiopia released in 2005, Agula has an estimated total population of 4,636, of whom 2,229 are men and 2,407 are women. The 1994 census reported it had a total population of 2,666 of whom 1,187 were men and 1,479 were women.
