= Lake Giba =

Ethiopian reservoir

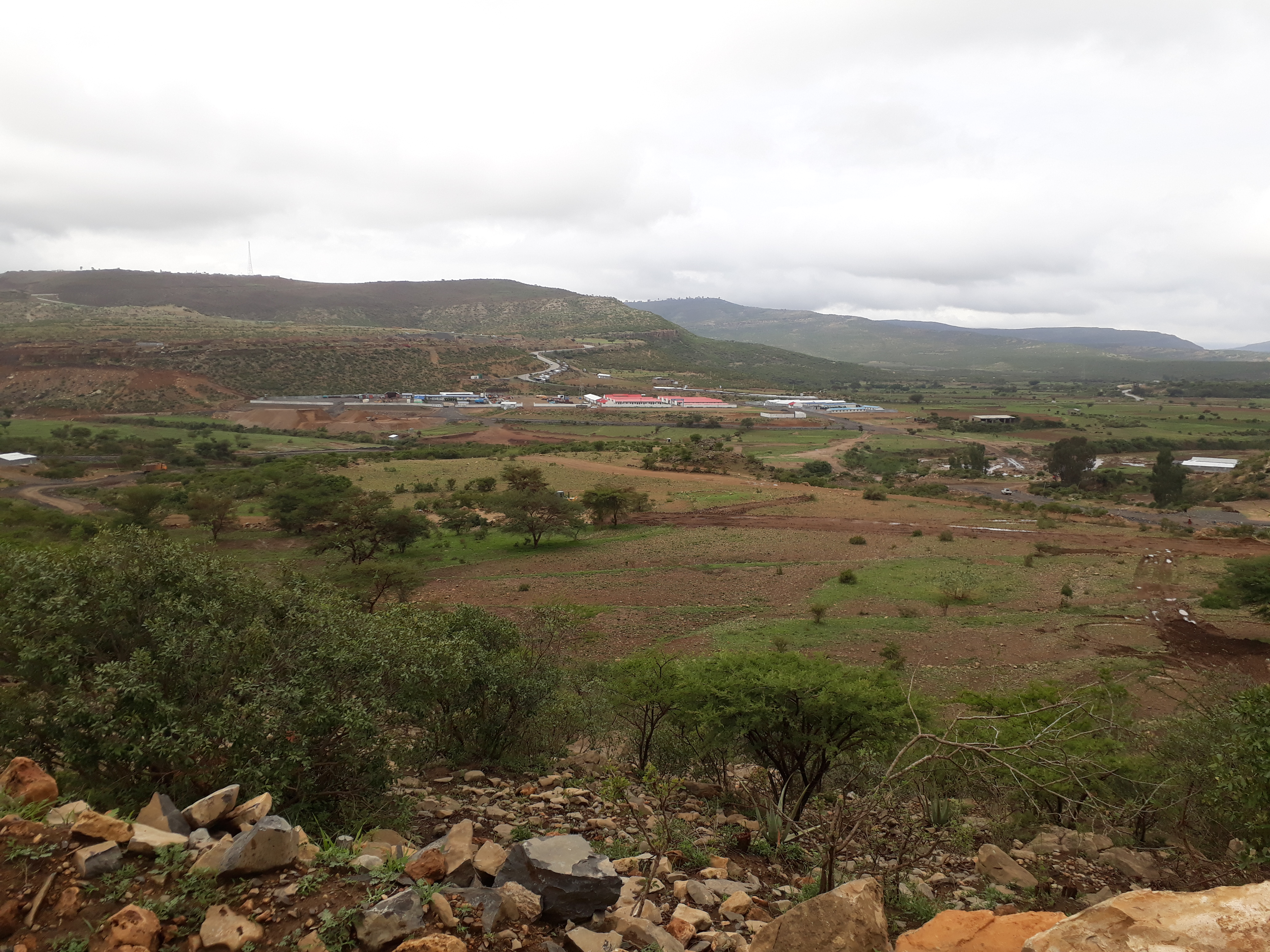
- Construction site of Giba dam

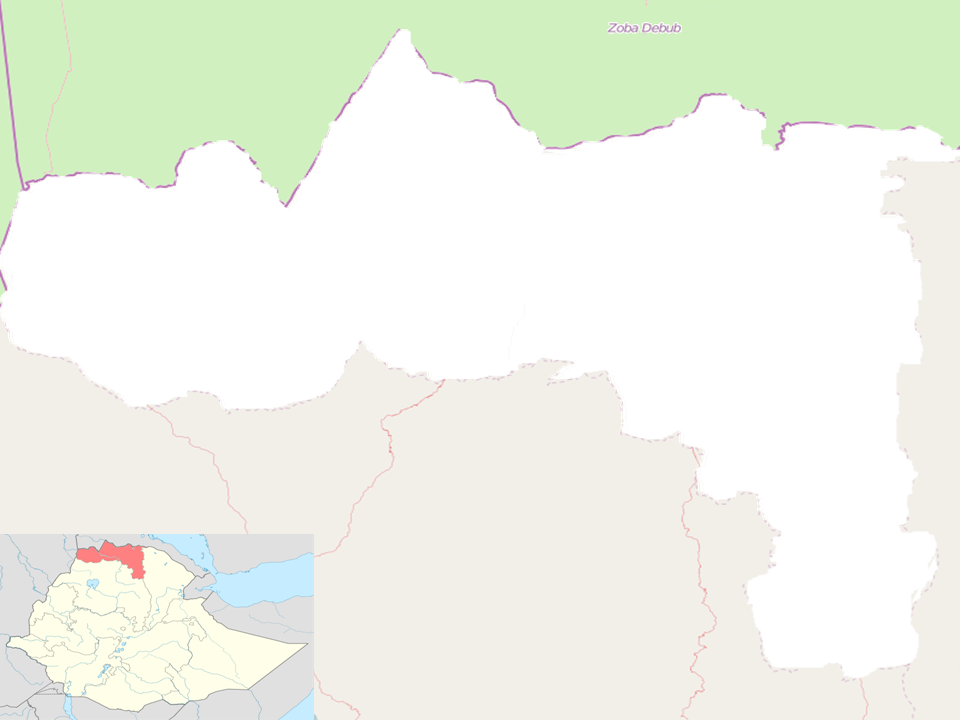
- Location within Tigray Region
- Location: Inderta, Dogu’a Tembien, Kilte Awula'ilo woredas
- Coordinates: 13.620559°N 39.402124°E
- Type: Freshwater artificial lake
- Primary inflows: Sulluh, Genfel and Agula'i Rivers
- Primary outflows: Giba River
- Catchment area: 2,394 km^{2} (924 sq mi)
- Basin countries: Ethiopia
- Max. length: 7 km (4.3 mi)
- Max. width: 1.5 km (0.93 mi)
- Surface area: 9 km^{2} (3.5 sq mi)
- Max. depth: 75 m (246 ft)
- Water volume: 350×10^{6} m^{3} (280,000 acre⋅ft)
- Surface elevation: 2,320 m (7,610 ft)
- Settlements: Romanat, Qarano

Lake Giba is a reservoir under construction at the border of the Inderta; Kilte Awula'ilo and Dogu’a Tembien woredas of the Tigray Region in Ethiopia. As of 2020, the earthen dam that holds the reservoir is under construction. It will collect the water from the catchments of Sulluh (969 km^{2}), Genfel (733 km^{2}), and Agula'i (692 km^{2}) rivers.

== Dam characteristics ==
The dam is aimed to provide drinking water to Mekelle and to regulate the river flow.

- Dam height: 80 metres
- Dam crest length: 1000 metres

== Capacity ==
- Original capacity: 350 million m³
- Reservoir area: 9 km^{3}

Average annual sediment input to the reservoir by the main rivers was calculated as 3.8 million tonnes:

- Sulluh: 862,410 t
- Genfel: 364,301 t
- Agula'i River: 2,618,528 t

== Flooding ==
The dam will occupy the wide valley bottom at the river confluences, which is currently occupied by farmlands and bushlands. The reservoir will extend into the lower Genfel and Suluh gorges, in a place called Shugu’a Shugu’i. No people are permanently living in the area that will be flooded. Current dryland villages Ch’in Feres (in Inderta), Addi Atereman and Worgesha (in Dogu’a Tembien) will become lakeshore villages, and Genfel church in the homonymous gorge will be on the edge of Lake Giba.

== Anticipated seepage ==
The lithology of the dam building site is Antalo Limestone. Part of its water is anticipated to be lost through seepage; the positive side-effect is that this will contribute to groundwater recharge in the downstream areas.
