= Kilte Awulaelo =

District in Tigray Region, Ethiopia

Coordinates: 13°45′N 39°30′E

Kilte Awulaelo ክልተ ኣውላዕሎ
- Woreda
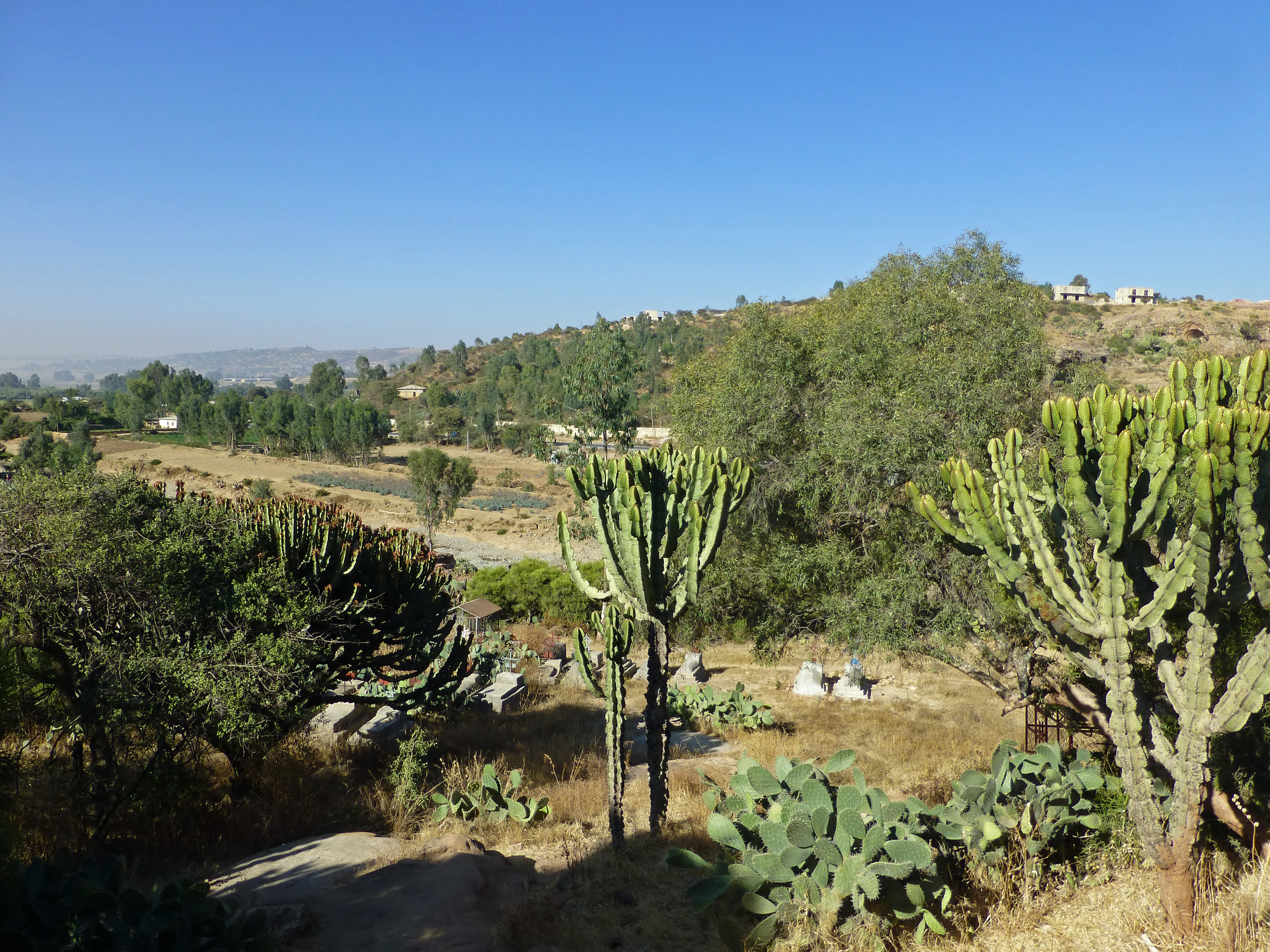

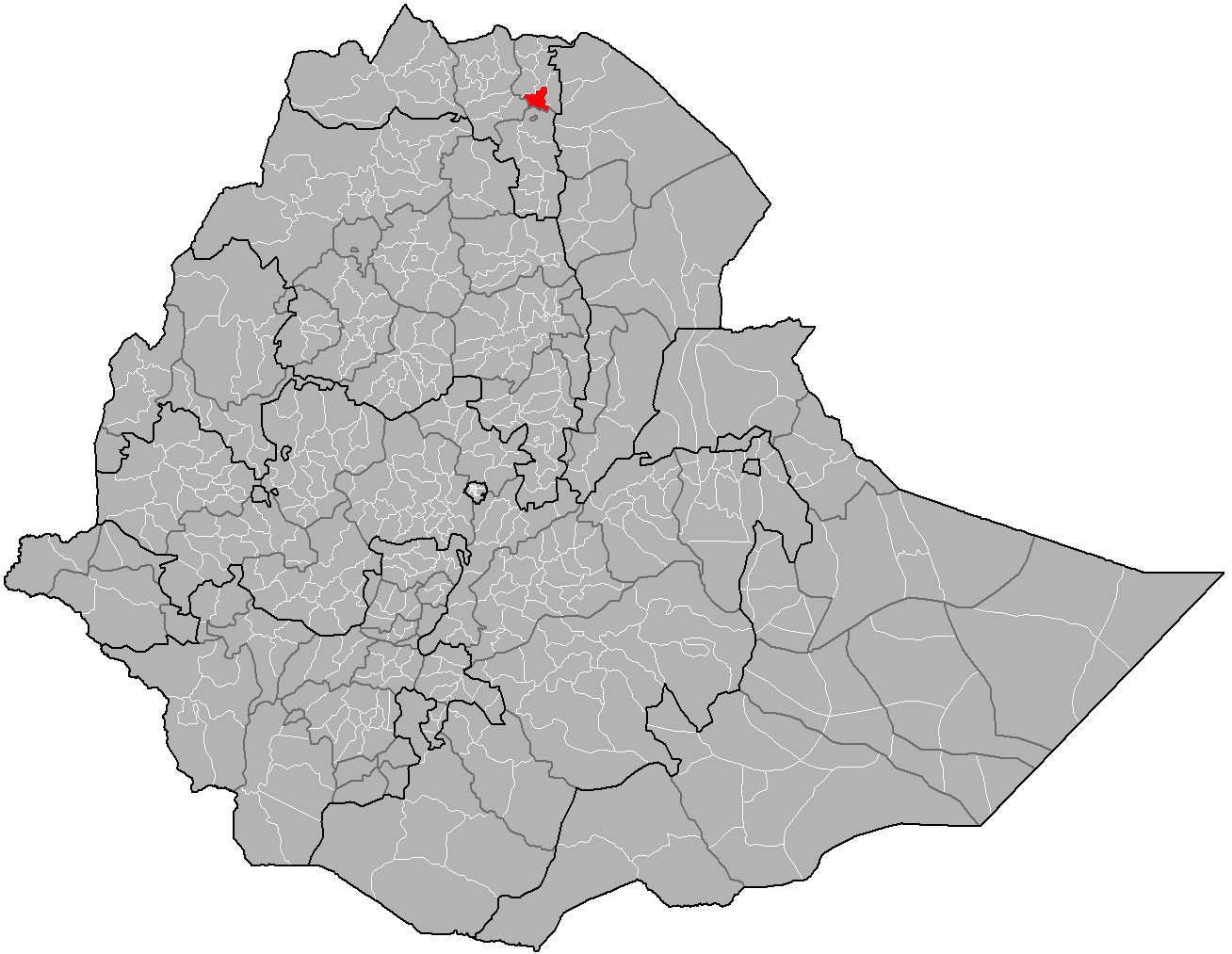
- Country: Ethiopia
- Region: Tigray
- Zone: Misraqawi (Eastern)

Area
  - Total: 2,068.25 km^{2} (798.56 sq mi)

Population (2007)
  - Total: 99,708

Kilte Awulaelo (Tigrinya: ክልተ ኣውላዕሎ; also transliterated as Kǝlǝttä ʾAwlaʿlo) is one of woredas in the Tigray Region of Ethiopia. Part of the Misraqawi Zone, Kilte Awulaelo is bordered on the south by the Debub Misraqawi (Southeastern) Zone, on the west by the Mehakelegnaw (Central) Zone, on the northeast by Hawzen, on the north by Saesi Tsaedaemba, and on the east by Atsbi Wenberta. Towns in the Kilte Awulaelo woreda include Agula, Tsigereda and Maimekden. Town of Wukro is surrounded by Kilte Awulaelo.

== History ==
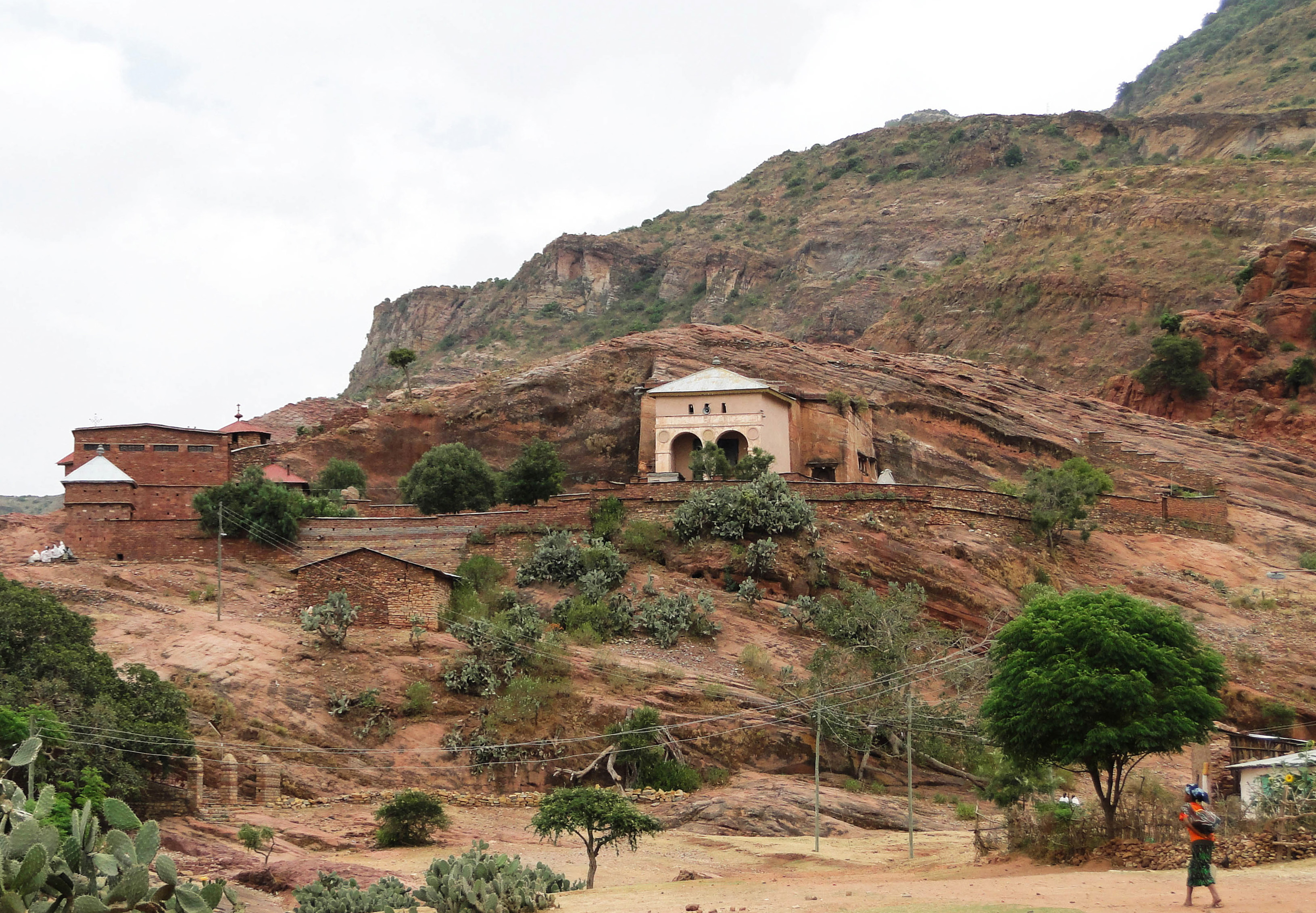
Abreha and Atsbeha Rock Church

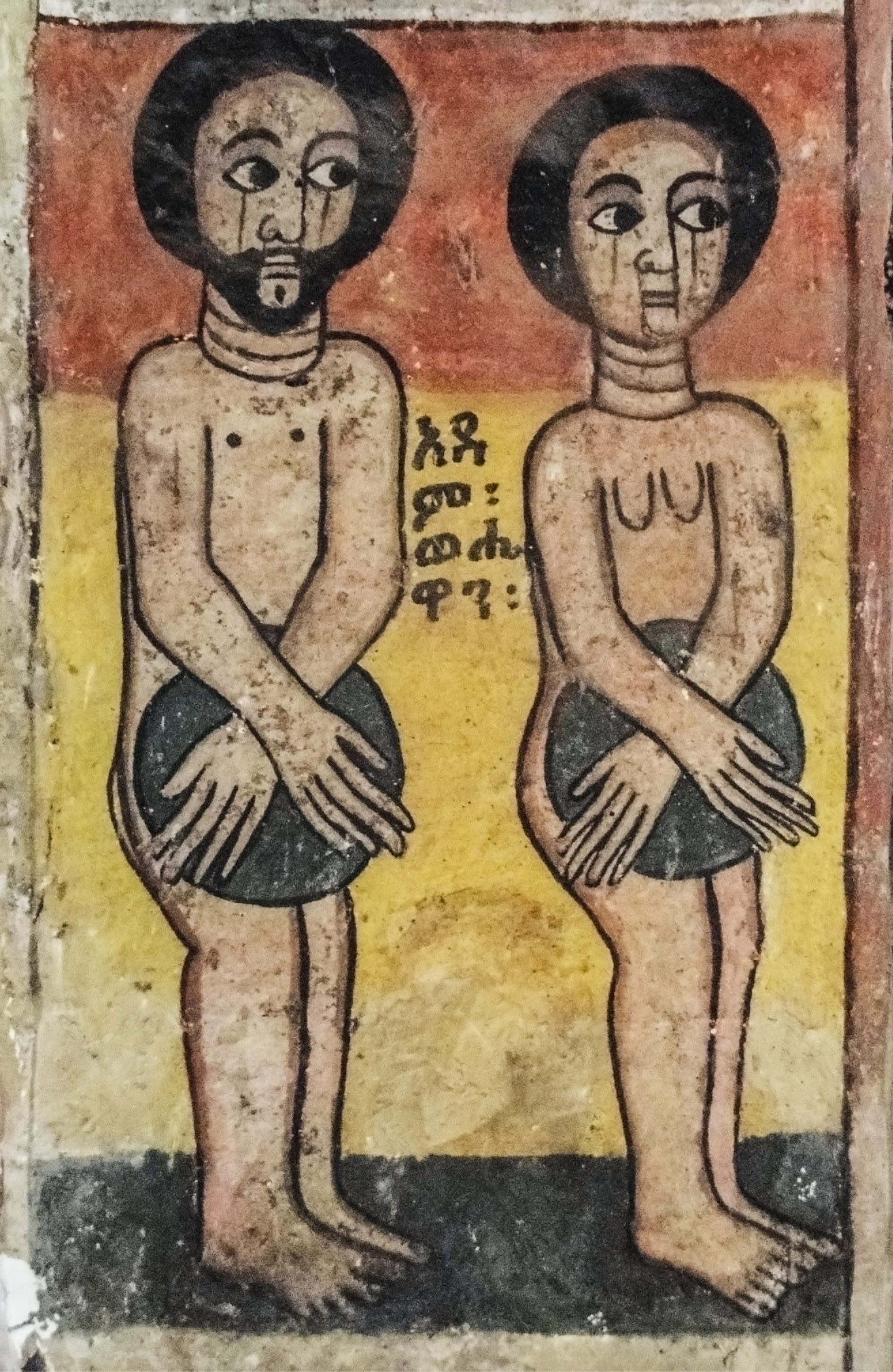
Abreha and Atsbeha Church - Painting of Adam and Eve

Archeological surveys at the village of Aynalem has recovered Sabaean inscriptions, an obelisk carved from stone, rocks shaped to resemble Egyptian pyramids, and ancient metal utensils in an area which has been left uncultivated due to religious beliefs. Gezaei Haile, a scientist and geology instructor at Mekelle University, in an interview with Jimma Times dated these artifacts to "a time of 200 years before birth of Christ, as none of the antiquities have sign of cross on them." There are several local monolithic churches in this woreda. These include Wukro Chirkos (at the edge of Wukro town), Abreha we Atsbeha, and Minda'e Mikael. The village of Negash, widely believed to be the first Muslim settlement in Africa, is also an important local landmark.

Wukro was one of nine woredas in Tigray most affected by a drought during 2008, requiring emergency food supplies to be requested for an estimated 600,000 people.

In 2020, woreda Kilte Awula'ilo became inoperative and its territory belongs to the following new woredas:

- Kilte Awula'ilo (new, smaller, woreda)
- Agula'i (part of it)
- Geralta (part of it)
- Wukro town

== Demographics ==
Based on the 2007 national census conducted by the Central Statistical Agency of Ethiopia (CSA), this woreda has a total population of 99,708, an increase of 16.53% over the 1994 census, of whom 48,645 are men and 51,063 women; 4,808 or 4.82% are urban inhabitants. With an area of 2,068.25 square kilometers, Wukro has a population density of 48.21, which is less than the Zone average of 56.93 persons per square kilometer. A total of 21,657 households were counted in this woreda, resulting in an average of 4.60 persons to a household, and 20,932 housing units. The majority of the inhabitants said they practiced Ethiopian Orthodox Christianity, with 97.08% reporting that as their religion, while 2.8% of the population were Muslim.

The 1994 national census reported a total population for this woreda of 85,561, of whom 41,404 were men and 44,157 were women; 19,894 or 23.25% of its population were urban dwellers. The two largest ethnic groups reported in Wukro were the Tigrayan (98.55%), and the Afar (1.16%); all other ethnic groups made up 0.29% of the population. Tigrinya is spoken as a first language by 99.83%. The majority of the inhabitants practiced Ethiopian Orthodox Christianity, with 95.2% reporting that as their religion, while 4.69% were Muslim. Concerning education, 18.08% of the population were considered literate, which is greater than the Zone average of 9.01%; 28.78% of children aged 7–12 were in primary school; 1.85% of the children aged 13–14 were in junior secondary school; 4.65% of the inhabitants aged 15–18 were in senior secondary school. Concerning sanitary conditions, about 90% of the urban houses and 37% of all houses had access to safe drinking water at the time of the census; about 40% of the urban and about 17% of the total had toilet facilities.

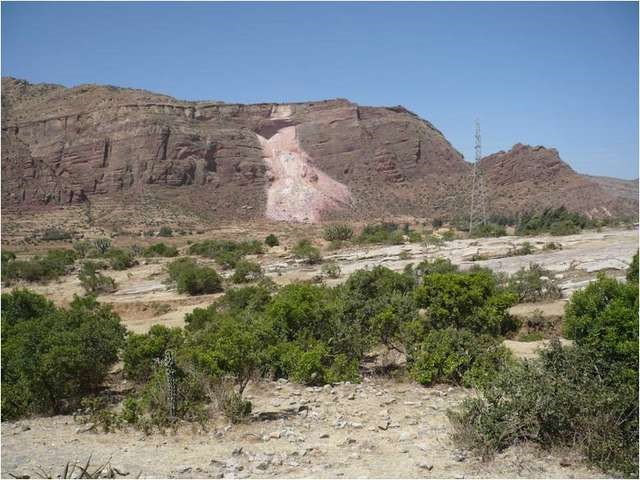
Rockfall north of Wuqro

== Agriculture ==
A sample enumeration performed by the CSA in 2001 interviewed 15,542 farmers in this woreda, who held an average of 0.94 hectares of land. Of the 14,563 hectares of private land surveyed, 86.4% was under cultivation, 2.38% pasture, 7.2% fallow, 0.63% in woodland, and 3.38% was devoted to other uses. For the land under cultivation in this woreda, 73% was planted in cereals, 8.2% in pulses, 2% in oilseeds, and 9 hectares in vegetables. The total area planted in fruit trees was 408 hectares, while 4 hectare was planted in gesho. 74.83% of the farmers both raised crops and livestock, while 20.18% only grew crops and 4.99% only raised livestock. Land tenure in this woreda is distributed amongst 84.22% owning their land, 14.35% renting, and 1.43% holding their land under other forms of tenure.

== Rivers ==
The two main rivers of this woreda are Genfel and Agula'i River, which both drain to Giba River.

== Reservoirs ==
In this district with rains that last only for a couple of months per year, reservoirs of different sizes allow harvesting runoff from the rainy season for further use in the dry season. The Lake Giba is under construction at the southwestern edge of the woreda. Smaller reservoirs include Gereb May Zib'i and Ginda'i. Overall, these reservoirs suffer from rapid siltation. Part of the water that could be used for irrigation is lost through seepage; the positive side-effect is that this contributes to groundwater recharge.

== Churches and monasteries ==
As of 2013, 106 church institutions were registered in the woreda. Churches and monasteries in the woreda that contain historical manuscripts and artefacts include:

- Kädiḥ Däbrä Täwaḥǝdo Qǝddǝst Maryam
- Bäläsa Däbrä Gännät Qǝddus Mikaʾel
- ʾAgulaʿ Getesemani Kidanä Mǝḥrät gädam
- Qaḥen Däbrä Ṣadǝqan
- ʿAddi ʾArbaʾa Däbrä Sǝbḥat Qǝddǝst Maryam
- Ṣaḥǝlo Däbrä Ṣäḥay Qǝddǝst Maryam
- Däräba Mädḫane ʿAläm
- Mäʿago ʾAmanuʾel
