= Wukro =

Town in Tigray Région, Ethiopia

Wukro ውቕሮ
- Town
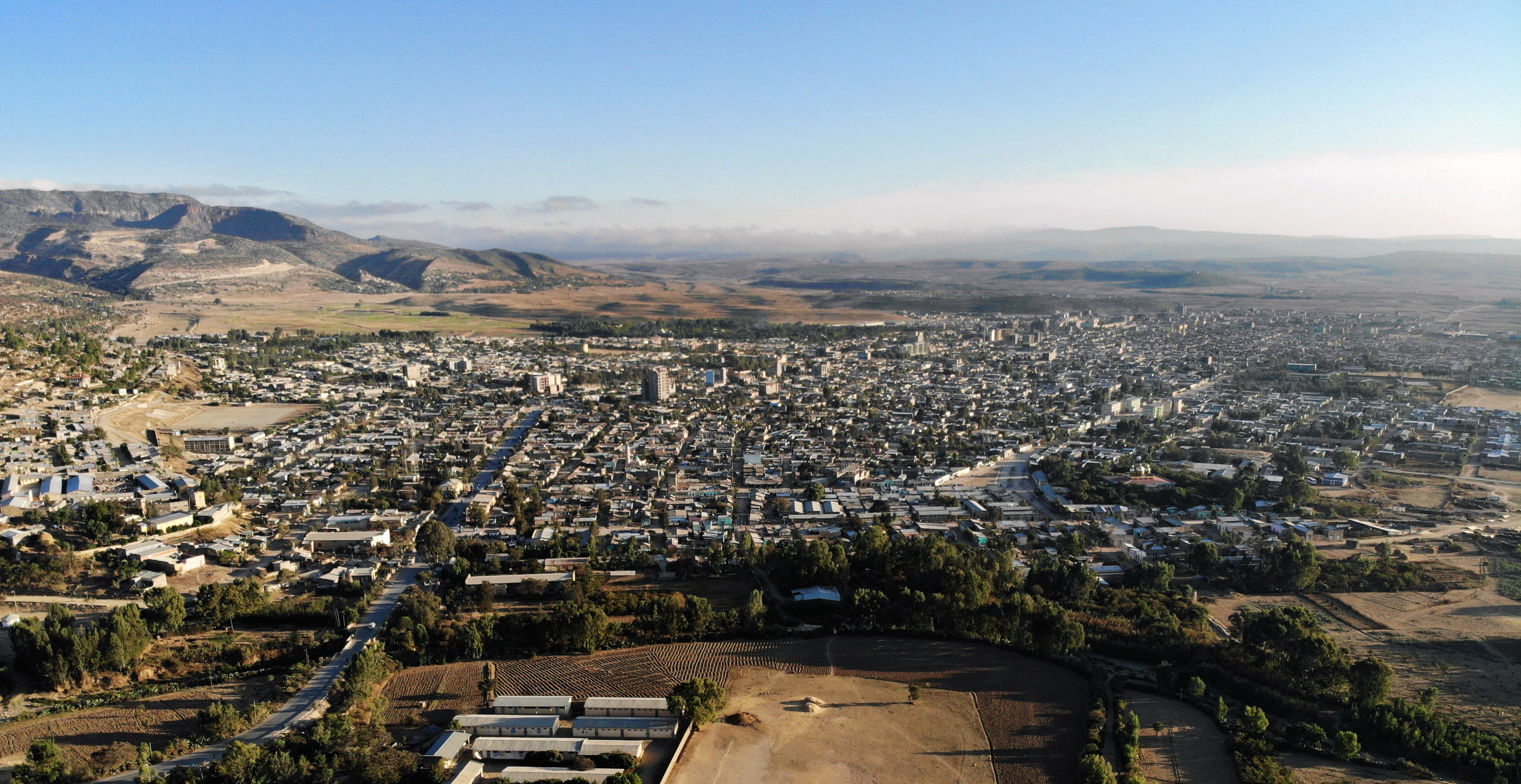

- Location within Ethiopia
- Coordinates: 13°47′N 39°36′E
- Country: Ethiopia
- Region: Tigray
- Zone: Misraqawi
- District: Wukro
- Elevation: 1,972 m (6,470 ft)

Population (2007)
  - Total: 30,210
- Time zone: UTC+3 (East Africa Time)
- Climate: BSh

Wukro (also transliterated Wuqro, Tigrigna: ውቕሮ; also known as Wukro Kilte Awulaelo, Tigrigna: ውቕሮ ክልተ ኣውላዕሎ) is a small town and separate woreda in Tigray, Ethiopia. The population of Wukro was around 50,000 in 2013. Wukro is located along Genfel River, in the Eastern Zone of the Tigray Region on the Asmara-Addis Ababa highway (Ethiopian Highway 2). Wukro is surrounded by Kilte Awulaelo woreda. The rock-hewn churches around Wukro are the town's most distinctive landmarks. Visually it can be characterised by one main road, few cars, yet many bajaj (three-wheeled auto-rickshaws) and hotels under construction. Hotels have been growing to serve conferences and to accommodate tourists departing to regional attractions.

In earlier sources the area is usually referred to as Dongolo (Ge'ez: ዶንጎሎ) before the foundation of Wukro as a modern town, after the name of the main village nearby, while the term Wukro just referred originally to the church area of Wuqro Cherqos which was situated within the land of Dongolo village. Due to the establishment of modern infrastructure, including a far-distance road, the area around Wuqro Cherqos evolved into a town by itself, thus separated from Dongolo and became an economic and administrative centre by itself. The town's name derives from the Tigrigna word for a structure carved from the living rock, Wukro.

Wukro comprises three urban kebeles (sub-cities): Agazi, Dedebit and Hayelom.

Wukro has been described as "a rapidly growing small town of failing water services" (as of 2022).

== Spelling of the name ==
Like many proper names in Ethiopia, there are a number of transliterations of this name into English. David Buxton lists the many ways Wukro "has been variously spelt: Agroo, Corou, Oucro, Ouquo, Ucro, Ouaqero, Oukero, Ouogro, Uogro, Woghuro, Wogro, Waqro, and Weqro. Some of these forms...are influenced by French or Italian spelling conventions".

== Location ==
Wukro is located in the Tigray Region and is 40 km north of Mekelle, the regional capital. The coordinates are: latitude: 13° 47' 59.99 N and longitude: 39° 35' 59.99 E.

== History ==
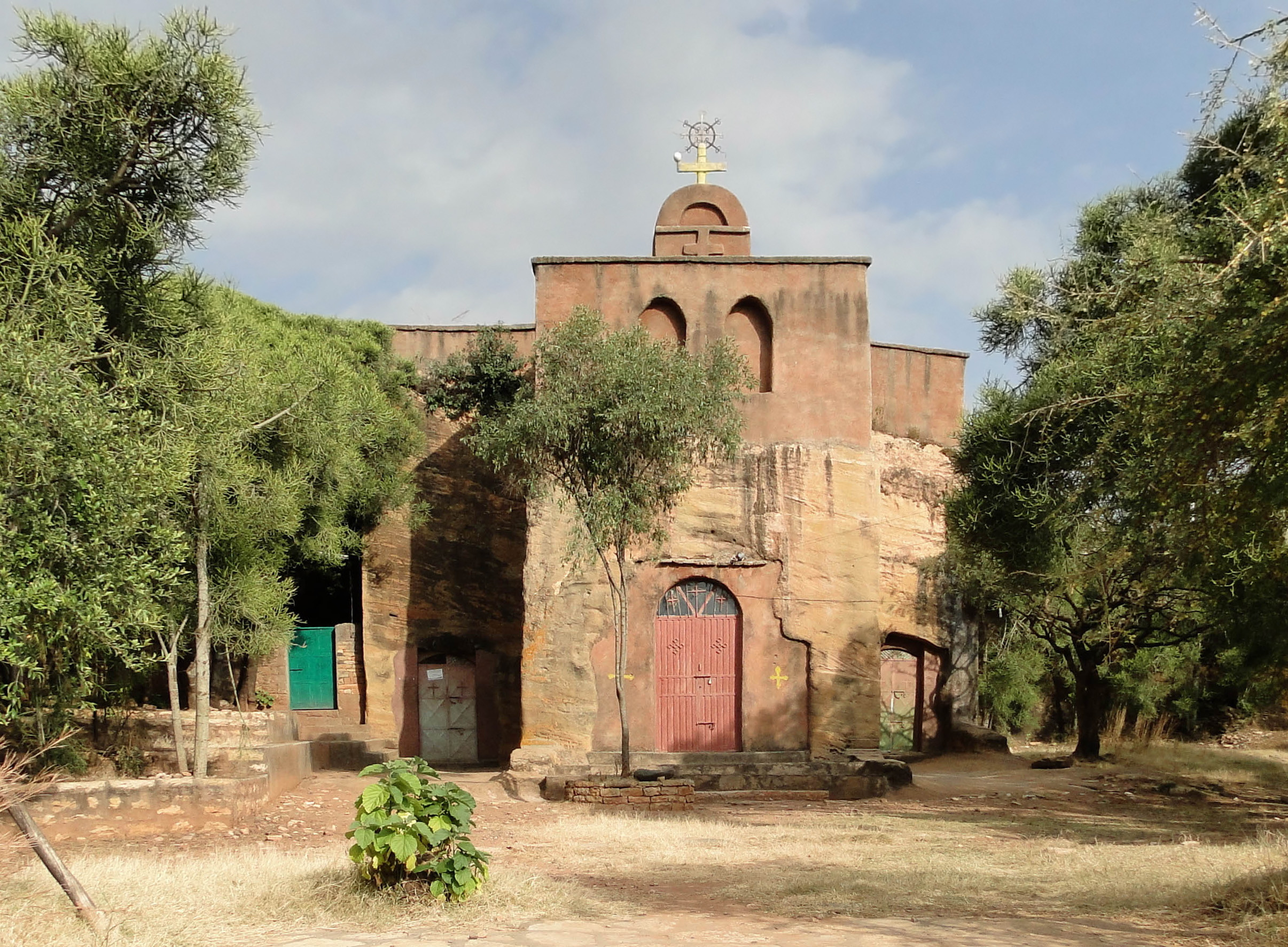
Wukro Chirkos in Wukro

=== Ancient ===
Wukro has been inhabited for millennia. Archaeological digs have found inscriptions from between the sixth and eighth century B.C. The place is part of the ancient trade route (particularly for salt) linking the Red Sea with inner Ethiopia, all the way to Lasta. It is said to be the location of the tomb of seventh-century Ethiopian king who hosted Muhammed and his followers. It has many rock hewn churches. The place is named in many old Ge'ez sources, including those about the thirteenth-century Ethiopian king Lalibela, the sixteenth-century king Zär'a Ya'eqob, and the seventeenth-century king Susenyos.

=== 1600s ===
Francisco Álvares was the first European recorded to have visited Wukro, when in 1521 he stayed at the royal inn or Betenegush. His account also includes a description of Maryam Wukro church "made in a rock, hewn and wrought with the pickaxe, with three aisles and their supports made of the rock itself."

=== 19th Century ===
The next important European visit was in 1868 when Lieutenant-General Sir Robert Napier passed through the village on his way to Magdela where he defeated the Ethiopian Emperor Tewodros II. During their march through Wukro, members of the British army saw one of the Tigrayan rock-hewn churches, most likely Wukro Chirkos, and were afterwards thought to be the first Europeans to see these unusual structures; another notable landmark is the more recent church Wukro Giyorgis Bete.

=== 20th Century ===
During the Italian occupation, in 1938, there were shops and a hotel-restaurant, a car service station, a telephone and telegraph office and a health post. It was qualified as an "Italian town under development". Many of these buildings are still present, just south of the bridge. Francesco Baldassare started a mill in Wukro, but abandoned it when the Italians were defeated in 1941. Wukro was used as his headquarters by Blatta Haile Mariam Redda during the Woyane rebellion, until Ras Abebe Aregai captured the town 17 October 1943. Dawit W. Girgis reports in his memoirs that in 1964, with the permission of Emperor Haile Selassie, the Israelis operated a secret base outside Wukro where members of the Anyanya (a Sudanese rebel group) were trained in guerrilla warfare.

During the Ethiopian Civil War, Wukro was repeatedly attacked by Derg aircraft in 1988, resulting in the deaths of a total of 175 residents:

- On 8 April 1988: about 100 killed
- On 13 April 1988: 31 killed
- On 29–30 April 1988: 25 killed
- On 3 May 1988: 20 killed

=== 21st Century ===
Wukro was damaged heavily during the Tigray War. It was bombed in mid-November 2020, then shelled by artillery fire a few weeks later, resulting in heavy destruction of property and multiple civilian deaths. There was looting of public and private property leaving shops empty and the hospital 75% destroyed. Occupying soldiers engaged in sexual violence, extrajudicial killings, and detention of civilians through at least March 2021.

== Economy ==
Local industry includes Sheba Tannery, which is capable of processing 6,000 hides a day. Opened in 2004, the tannery is one of the 13 companies owned and managed by the Endowment Fund for the Rehabilitation of Tigray (EFFORT).

Kuwaiti Prime Minister Sheikh Nasser Mohammed Al-Ahmed Al-Sabah announced in July 2009, during a 3-day visit to Ethiopia, that his country would provide a $63 million loan to Ethiopia, part of which would be used to build a road between Wukro and Zalambessa near the Eritrean-Ethiopian border.

=== Female small-scale entrepreneurship ===
Small towns in sub-Saharan Africa, such as Wukro, represent over half the urban population and offer an important space for women's empowerment and advancement in between the confines in rural life and the anonymity of migrating to large cities. Women entrepreneurs in Wukro are for example owners of coffee shops (bunabéts) or traditional beer houses (inda siwa) that often combine making basic food (i.e. injera or grocery), or hair salon businesses.

Water precarity impacts the ability of entrepreneurs, especially female ones, to control development of their business as they are exposed to multiple entrepreneurial risks such as losing business space, customers as well as precious time and energy to make products. The term water precarity denotes a water system's unreliability, frequent poor quality and insufficiency. The greatest benefits for women entrepreneurs would be from support that enables women to get more control of their businesses. This includes for example rights for affordable access to primary commodities, transparency in water supply and the availability of legal alternative water sources.

== Demographics ==
The population of Wukro was around 50,000 in 2013. As of 2022, the town has been experiencing an inflow of capital from low-skilled labour migration; Tigray has experienced particularly high numbers of labour mobility and Ethiopia has one of the largest flows of low-skilled, female domestic labour migrants.

Previous population figures include:

- Based on the 2007 national census conducted by the Central Statistical Agency, Wukro had a total population of 30,210, of whom 14,056 are men and 15,154 are women. A total of 9,383 households were counted in this town, resulting in an average of 3.22 persons to a household, and 8,993 housing units. The majority of the inhabitants said they practiced Ethiopian Orthodox Christianity, with 92.94% reporting that as their religion, while 6.03% of the population were Muslim.
- The 1994 census reported the town had a total population of 16,421 of whom 7,427 were men and 8,994 were women. It is the largest settlement in Wukro woreda.
- In 1938, the town counted 368 inhabitants (including 78 Italians).

== Infrastructure ==
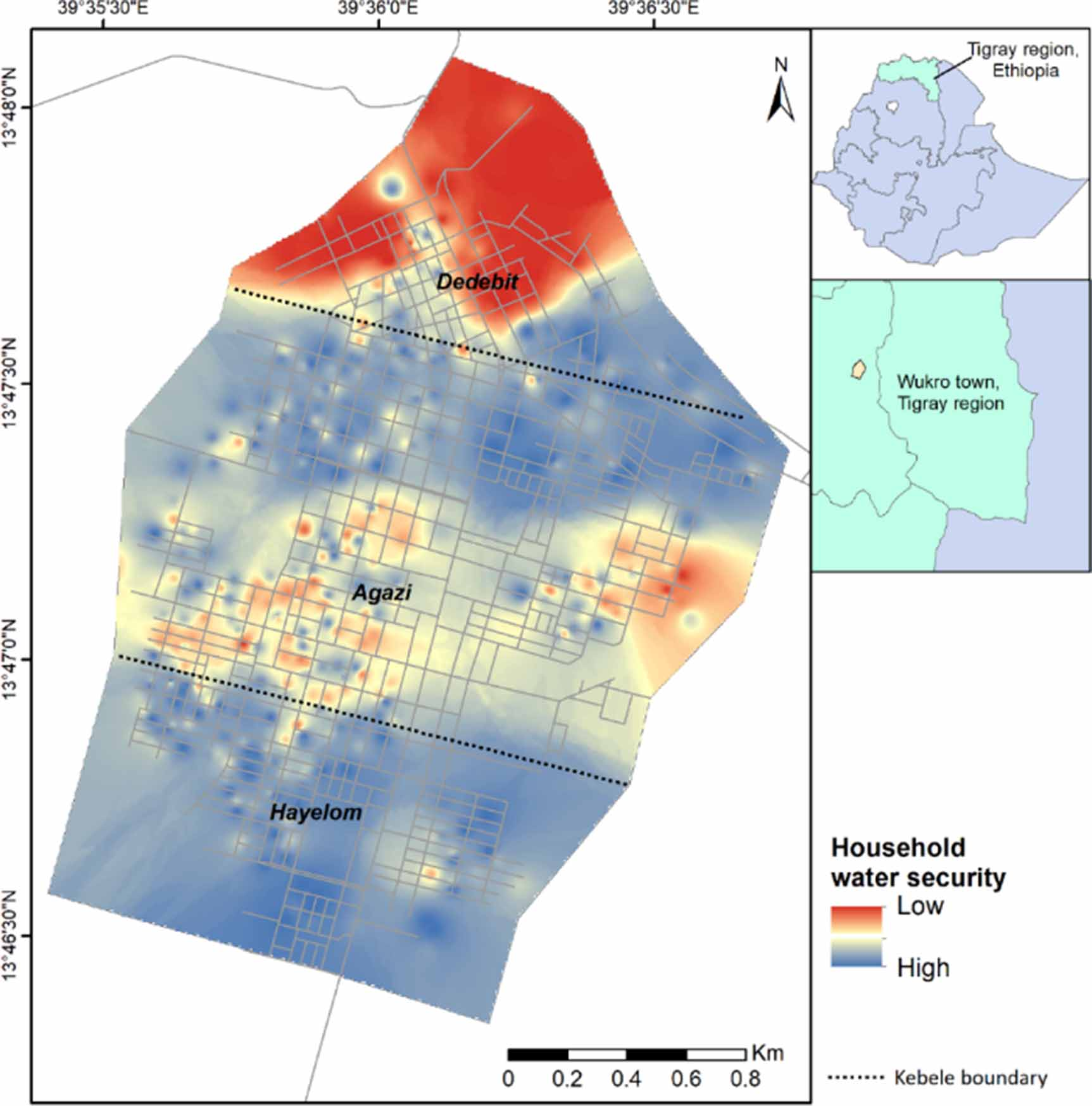
Map of Wukro town showing spatial distribution of household water security in August 2019. Red areas have low household water security.

=== Water supply and sanitation ===
Wukro has been growing rapidly and building construction has increased pressure on scarce water resources. The difference in water supply between the 'haves' and 'have nots' was found to be profound in 2022. For instance, in the central part of Wukro (Agazi) only 8 per cent of respondents reported stopping domestic or enterprise activities at home due to water scarcity experienced in the last year, compared to 66 per cent in the Northern part of the town (Dedebit), despite all the houses having their own taps.

Wukro has been described as "a rapidly growing small town of failing water services" (as of 2022).

Water in Wukro has been a scarce resource due to urban population growth, construction, and the seasonality of water availability. Climate variability is a driver of water access in Wukro, with greater access to water during the wet season, particularly July to September. In the dry season, around 43%–45% of households rely solely on piped water to meet domestic water needs, which is mostly supplemented with buying water. In the wet season, just over half of households rely on piped water only for drinking and cooking, while rainwater is used widely for washing clothes, cleaning and bathing; a smaller proportion of households still rely on bought water for drinking and cooking.

To improve urban water access in the town of Wukro, its water utility expanded and renovated the existing piped water system. The project had financial support from the National ONEWASH programme, UNICEF and UK Foreign, Commonwealth & Development Office, as well as the Tigray regional and national governments, Inaugurated in 2018, this included the development of more productive and reliable boreholes with a planning period from 2015 to 2035, designed to provide water equally over all water demand nodes of the distribution network. As part of this project, three new boreholes were constructed in an artesian aquifer in the Abreha-we-Athsbeha village near Wukro. According to the municipal water utility in 2019, the boreholes were only producing 1900 m^{3} (with 19 per cent wastage) per day, below the minimum demand of 3141 m^{3}.

Despite this expanded piped water system, there is still (as of 2022) a high degree of spatial heterogeneity in the reliability of piped water supply. Some households in Wukro have supply of tap water six days a week, some only 1–3 days per week, some do not have piped water for weeks or even months; others do not even have piped water on their premises at all. In this situation of water precarity, lack of clarity, consistency and geographical fairness, people resort to using different water sources. People buy water from water tankers or supplement their water needs by borrowing or purchasing from neighbours, or informal water vendors, at costs ranging from 2 to 10 birr [0.07–0.34 EUR] per 20-litre jerrycan. This is much higher than the 5 birr [0.17 EUR] per 1000-litres through the piped network.

== See also ==
- Soil in Kilte Awula'ilo
- Temple of Meqaber Gaʿewa
