= 2019–2022 locust infestation =

Locust outbreak in Africa and Asia

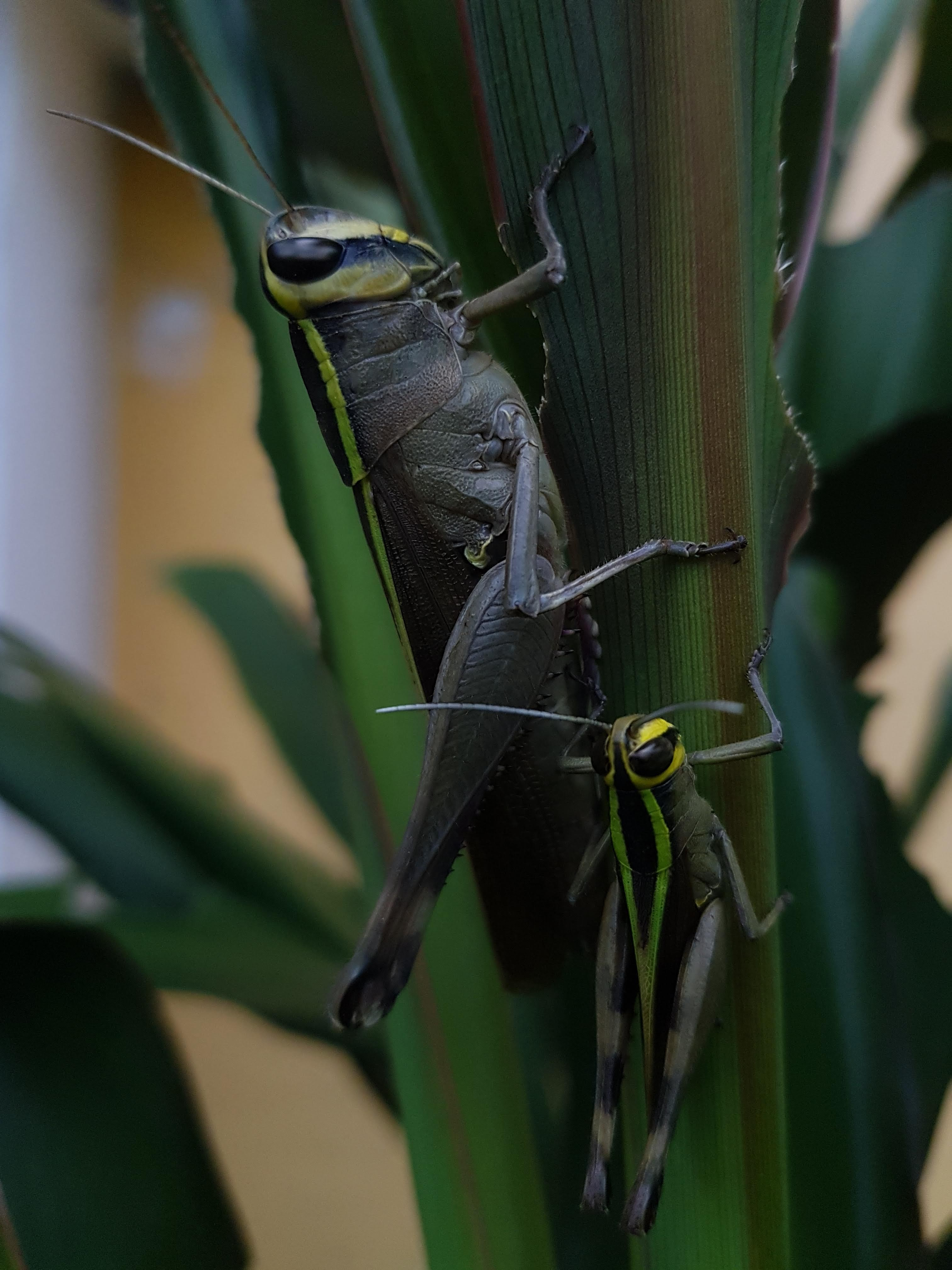
- Date: June 2019 – February 2022"Desert Locust situation update". fao.org. FAO.
- Location: Somalia Kenya Democratic Republic of the Congo Djibouti Eritrea Ethiopia Saudi Arabia South Sudan Sudan Uganda Yemen India Pakistan Iran Nepal"Horn of Africa: Locust Infestation - Oct 2019". ReliefWeb. Burundi

Map
- Position and trajectory of the remaining locust swarms in the Horn of Africa and Yemen, October 2020

Between June 2019 and February 2022, a major outbreak of desert locusts began developing, threatening food supplies in East Africa, the Arabian Peninsula and the Indian subcontinent. The outbreak was the worst to hit Kenya in 70 years, and the worst in 25 years for Ethiopia, Somalia, and India.

The locust infestations began when Cyclone Mekunu in 2018 produced heavy rains in the Rub' al Khali of the Arabian Peninsula; in spring 2019, swarms spread from these areas, and by June 2019, the locusts spread north to Iran, Pakistan, and India and south to East Africa, particularly the Horn of Africa. By the end of 2019, there were swarms in Ethiopia, Eritrea, Somalia, Kenya, Saudi Arabia, Yemen, Egypt, Oman, Iran, India, and Pakistan. By June 2020, a separate swarm appeared in South America, affecting Paraguay and Argentina.

In April 2020, travel and shipping restrictions precipitated by the spread of COVID-19 began to hamper efforts to control the locusts, preventing the transport of pesticides, equipment, and personnel, and contributing to the global incidence of COVID-19 related food insecurity.

Locust swarms worldwide faced a steady decline in size from May to October 2020, as countries and intergovernmental organisations instituted extensive aerial and ground pest control efforts, aided by low quantities of rainfall in several affected regions, as well as the absence of storm activity in the Indian Ocean. By October 2020, Ethiopia, Eritrea, Somalia and Yemen continued to harbour significant swarms of locusts, with the remainder situated in isolated pockets of Kenya, Sudan and Saudi Arabia. Locust swarms continued to threaten countries around the southern Red Sea and Gulf of Aden, as well as their immediate neighbours, until February 2022 when the surge was officially declared to be over.

== Causes ==
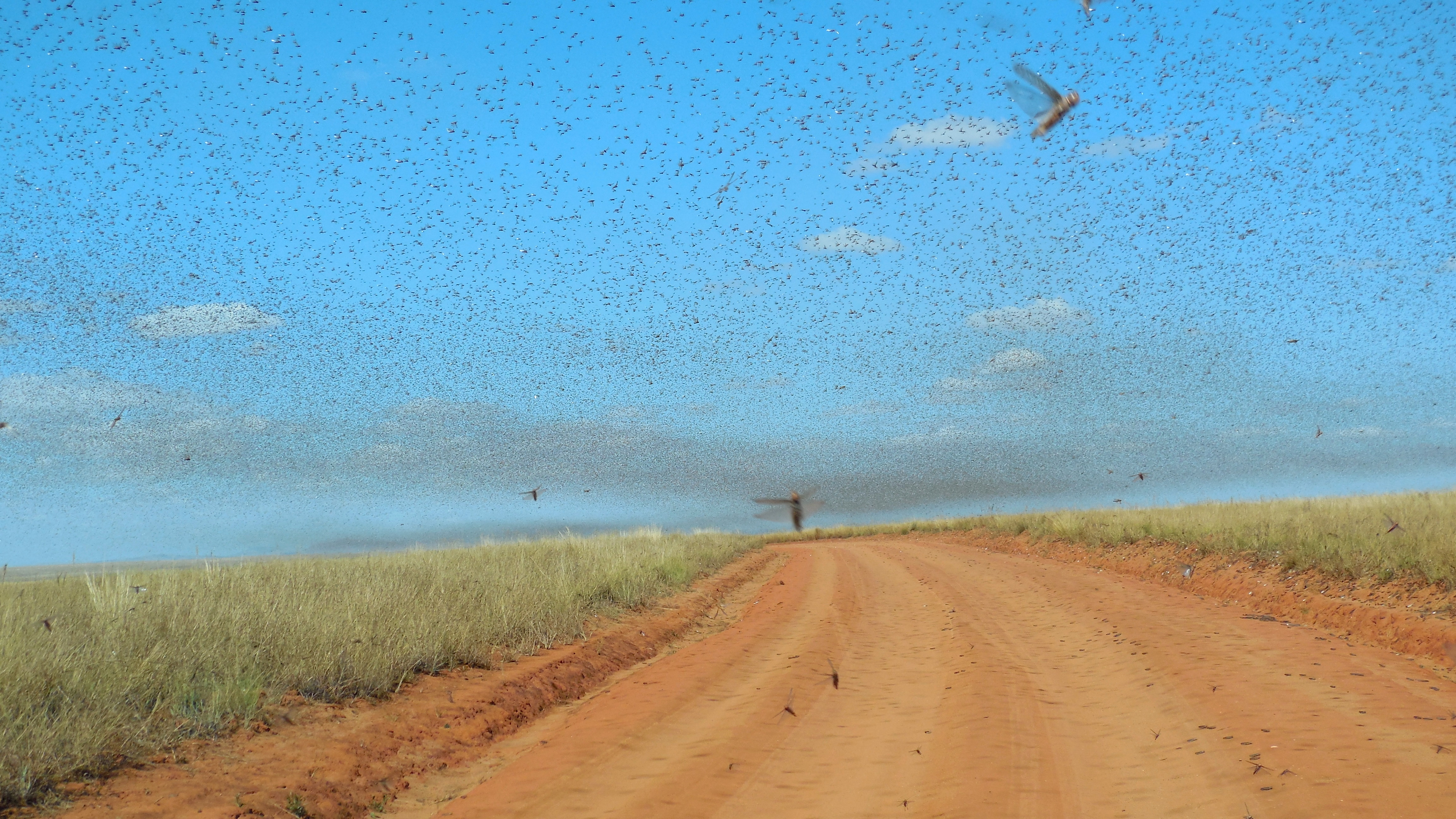
Swarm near Satrokala, Madagascar during a 2014 outbreak, illustrative of swarm sizes.

When periods of heavy rainfall follow periods of relative drought, solitary desert locusts emerge to feed on new-growth foliage and lay eggs in the newly moist soil, which prevents them from drying out. The sight and smell of other locusts, as well as sensory stimulation from contact between locusts' hind legs, precipitates changes in the locusts' behaviour and morphology; the previously green, nocturnal and solitary creatures become larger, develop black-and-yellow colouring, and begin to seek out other locusts, a process known as gregarization. These changes result in the formation of large locust swarms that gregarize nearby locusts and breed profusely, allowing them to undergo rapid, exponential growth. The swarms proceed to feed on the newly abundant vegetation, making use of improved swarm coordination, the result of larger brain sizes, as well as increased range, the result of increased metabolic activity, larger muscles, and longer wings, to travel up to 130 km a day in search of new vegetation and moist weather, often propelling themselves by the wind.

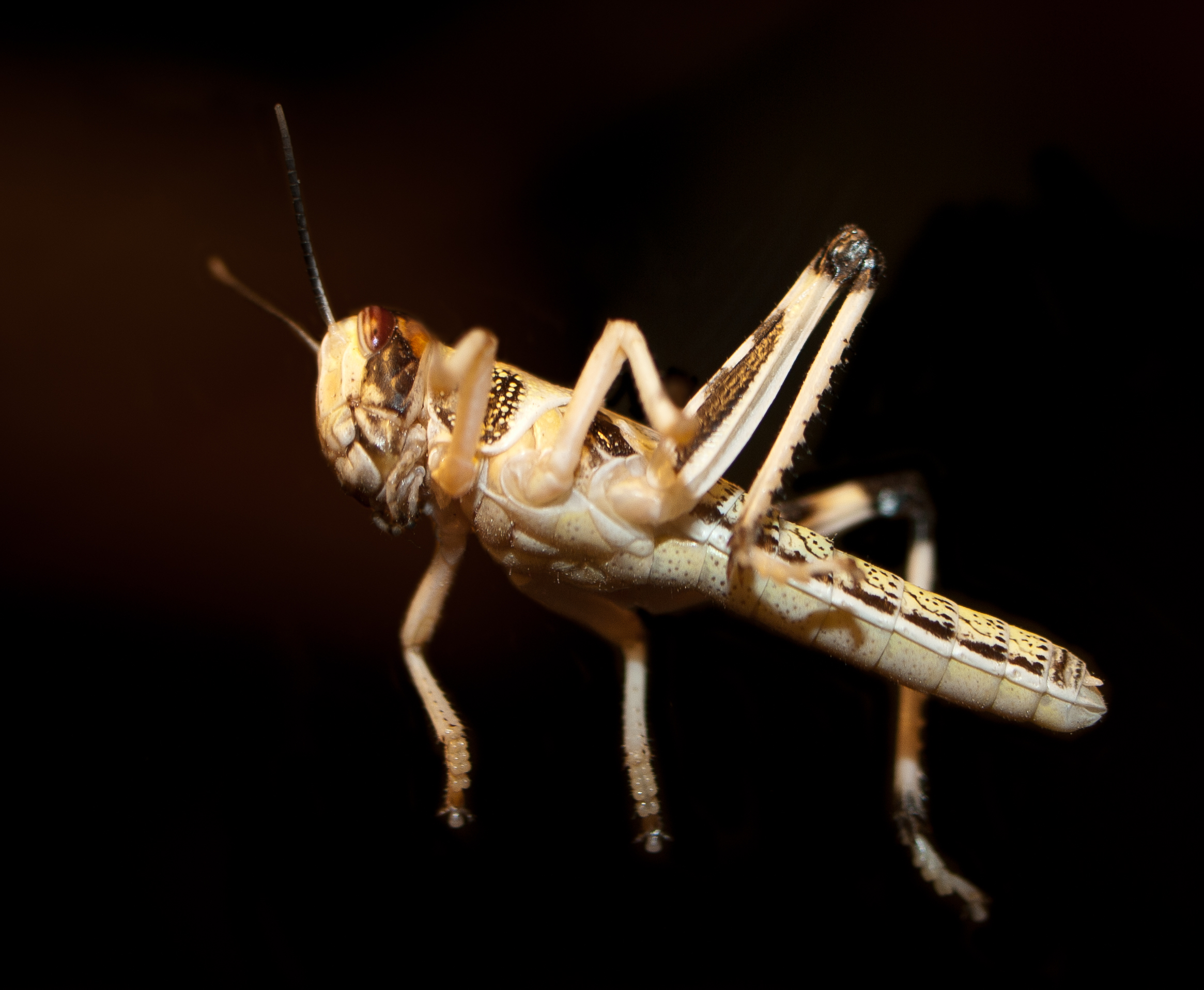
Black and yellow colored Desert Locust.

This particular desert locust plague traces back to May 2018, when Cyclone Mekunu passed over a vast, unpopulated desert on the southern Arabian Peninsula known as the Rub' al Khali, filling the space between sand dunes with ephemeral lakes, which allowed locusts to breed undetected. This was exacerbated in October 2018 by Cyclone Luban, which spawned in the central Arabian Sea, moved westward, and rained out over the same region near the border of Yemen and Oman. The Indian Ocean Dipole, an irregular oscillation in sea surface temperatures between the western and eastern parts of the Indian Ocean, has increased in magnitude due to the effects of climate change. This shift has resulted in increased cyclone activity over the last decade in the Persian Gulf, previously home to very few cyclones, and is associated with flooding in countries along the western Indian Ocean, dry weather in the east, and bushfires in Australia.

The two cyclones created conditions conducive to mass locust reproduction, enabling three generations of locusts to breed over a nine-month period, which increased their number in the Arabian Desert roughly 8,000-fold.

== Affected countries ==
Locust swarms had infested 23 countries by April 2020. East Africa was the epicenter of the locust crisis—with Ethiopia, Kenya, Somalia, and Uganda among the affected countries. However, the locusts had traveled far, wiping out crops in Pakistan and damaging farms in Yemen, a fragile country already hit hard by years of conflict.

=== Africa ===
By the summer of 2019, swarms had reached over the Red Sea and the Gulf of Aden into Ethiopia and Somalia, where they continued breeding and started causing concerns. This might have been as far as the locusts got were it not for the fact that during October 2018, East Africa experienced unusually widespread and intense autumn rains, which were capped in December by a rare late season cyclone Pawan that made landfall in Somalia. These events triggered yet another spurt of reproductive activity.

In January 2020, the outbreak was affecting Ethiopia, Kenya, Eritrea, Djibouti, Somalia, and Burundi. The infestation "presents an unprecedented threat to food security and livelihoods in the Horn of Africa," according to the United Nations Food and Agriculture Organization (FAO). Rising sea surface temperatures (cf. the Indian Ocean Dipole) tip the scales in favor of circulation patterns like the one that set the stage for the desert locust outbreak. Keith Cressman, senior locust forecasting officer with the Food and Agriculture Organization said, he thinks, "we can assume there will be more locust outbreaks and upsurges in the Horn of Africa.” The situation was fueled by unusually heavy rains, causing a big concern in the Horn of Africa, where more than 24 million people are food insecure and 12 million people are internally displaced. Favourable conditions for the locusts prolonged the menace through January 2021.

==== Kenya ====
On 28 December 2019, several large, immature swarms were first reported to have crossed into Kenya from Somalia, entering through the towns of Mandera and El Wak. Heavy rains over the preceding short rain season (October–December) created an environment conducive to locust breeding, and over the next two months the swarms spread and matured, infesting 21 counties by the end of February and reaching Kenya's borders with Uganda and Tanzania. By then, the plague was Kenya's worst locust outbreak in over seventy years, affecting approximately 70,000 hectares (172,973 acres) of land, and leading the country's agriculture minister to state that authorities were unprepared for an infestation of such scale. Over the next three months, particularly favourable rains caused locust swarms to migrate to the north-western counties of Kenya, and by mid-May, cumulative crop and pasture losses were estimated at between 5-15 percent in northern Kenya and 1-5 percent in south-eastern Kenya.

However, low levels of rainfall in May, in conjunction with both new and continued ground and aerial pest control initiatives, led the locust population, which had been stagnant over the preceding two months, to decline, with reduced average swarm sizes and a less widespread distribution of locusts, which were, by then, primarily resident in the north-western counties of Turkana and Marsabit. Continued low rainfall and the relative lack of greenery in north-western Kenya resulted in a progressive decline in both swarm size and overall population from June to September, resulting in reduced levels of locust maturation, which placed much of the remaining locust population in recession. As of October 2020, a few small (1–10 km^{2}) swarms, slowly maturing at the border between the north-western counties of Baringo, Laikipia, and Samburu, were the only remaining gregarious locust populations in the country.

==== Somalia ====
Somalia’s agriculture ministry called the outbreak a national emergency and major threat to the country’s fragile food security, saying the “uncommonly large” locust swarms are consuming huge amounts of crops. Combating the crisis wasn't expected to be easy, especially in Somalia, where parts of the country are in the grip of the al-Qaida-linked al-Shabab extremist group. Desert locusts were breeding in the regions of Galmudug (Mudug), Puntland, and Somaliland. Over the next six months, projections indicated that more than 100 000 hectares of land would have required direct control interventions in Somalia.

==== Eritrea ====
In swarms the size of major cities, the locusts had also affected various parts of Eritrea. The military and general public had been deployed to combat the crisis according to Eritrea's Agricultural Ministry. In Eritrea, big swarms of immature adults that migrated from Ethiopia, were identified and controlled around Shieb, Gahtielay, Wengebo, and Beareze of the Northern Red Sea Coast. Moreover, the swarms of Tree Locust had been detected in Tserona, Mai-seraw, Quatit, and Digsa districts of Southern Eritrea.

==== Ethiopia ====
The locusts also headed towards Ethiopia, Africa's second-most populous country, in that nation's worst outbreak in 25 years. Some residents were surprised to find the locusts inside their living rooms.

According to the Agriculture Ministry officials, the relatively few locusts that reached Ethiopia's capital Addis Ababa were “leftovers” from the “massive invasion” in the eastern and southern parts of the country. Spraying was conducted around the city to stop the outbreak from spreading elsewhere. Millions of people in this country already cope with the constant risk of drought or flooding,

The desert locust infestation in Ethiopia has deteriorated, despite ongoing ground and aerial control operations. Hoppers have fledged, and an increasing number of small immature and mature swarms have continued to devour crop and pasture fields in Tigray, Amhara, Oromia, and Somali regional states. In Amhara, some farms have registered nearly 100 percent loss of teff, a staple crop in Ethiopia. Moreover, eggs are hatching profusely and forming hopper bands in the Somali region, due to the heavy rainfall.

Despite major control and prevention operations, substantial crop losses had already occurred in the Amhara and Tigray regions of Ethiopia. The hopper bands (young locust populations moving together) had covered nearly 430 square kilometres and had consumed about 1.3 million metric tonnes of vegetation over a two-month period. The formation of bands continued in the rangelands of the Ethiopian Somali Region; and massive new swarms were expected to arrive from Yemen and Somalia. A swarm even forced an Ethiopian passenger plane off course in December.

Food ran out for the nearly 100,000 Eritrean refugees in Tigray, which was partially caused by the Tigran War.

==== Uganda ====
The locusts headed toward Uganda and fragile South Sudan, where almost half the country faces hunger as it emerges from civil war. Uganda has not had such an outbreak since the 1960s and was already on alert. Uganda has not had to deal with a locust infestation since the ’60s so there was concern about the ability for experts on the ground to be able to deal with it without external support, That week, Uganda’s prime minister told agriculture authorities that “this is an emergency and all agencies must be on the alert,” the government-controlled New Vision newspaper reported.

==== South Sudan ====
The locusts also headed towards South Sudan, where almost half the country faces hunger as it emerges from civil war. They have not had such an outbreak since the 1960s and was already on alert. In a country like South Sudan, where already 47% of the population is food insecure the crisis was expected to cause devastating consequences.

==== Djibouti ====
The Government of Djibouti estimates that the damage caused by the desert locust infestations on vegetation cover (crops and pastures) have already caused a loss of around US$5 million for the six regions of the country. In Djibouti, it is estimated that over 1,700 agropastoral farms across the country and nearly 50,000 hectares of pastureland have been destroyed by the swarms.

Burundi

The UN Food and Agricultural Organization (FAO) and Intergovernmental Authority on Development (IGAD) have both stated that the phenomenally heavy rains have contributed to not only the devastating 2019 Burundi landslides, but also a "serious and widespread desert locust outbreak". The Desert Locust Control Organization for Eastern Africa (the DLCO-EA which Burundi is not member of) noted the necessity for urgent and decisive action from all partners, as well as the resources to support large-scale ground surveys, aerial spraying services, provision of chemicals, information dissemination, and further capacity building for control operations.

=== Arabian Peninsula ===
Cyclones in May and October 2018 brought heavy rains that gave rise to favourable breeding conditions in the Empty Quarter of the southern Arabian Peninsula for at least nine months since June. Some countries like UAE and Iraq have seen small hopper groups but the situation is under control in these regions.

==== Yemen ====
In January 2019, one of the first swarms reached Yemen and it became one of the first breeding grounds for the desert locusts and caused them to spread more.

==== Saudi Arabia ====
From January to June 2019 the locusts started to enter Saudi Arabia. They have so far tried a lot to control the locusts.

=== South and South-West Asia ===
After June 2019 swarms invaded the Indo-Pakistan border from Iran and up to three generations occurred due to longer than normal monsoons giving rise to large numbers of swarms.

==== Pakistan ====
Since June 2019, the locust outbreak had been impacting eastern Pakistan. In November 2019, Karachi saw the first locust attack in the city since 1961.

On 29 January 2020, the provincial Khyber Pakhtunkhwa government declared emergency in nine southern districts of the province to control the spread of locusts. The emergency was declared in Dera Ismail Khan, Tank, Lakki Marwat, Bannu, Karak, Kohat, Hangu, North and South Waziristan districts.

On 1 February 2020, the Pakistani government declared a national emergency to protect crops and help farmers.

==== Iran ====
In Iran, as with the rest of the Asian countries, the locusts started arriving in the first six months of 2019. Heavy rains in southwest Iran exacerbated the situation. The control operations have been less successful in Yemen and Iran.

==== India ====
The swarms in India came from Iran and Pakistan, but the situation has been brought under control with the help of pesticides and specialist equipment. Although the extent of the damage is to be assessed, there was no major loss. A number of timely measures and a change in wind direction had prevented a spread and large-scale damage to the rapeseed and cumin seed crops, the officials said. The outbreak began late 2019 in Gujarat and Rajasthan.

Three villages in Gujarat's Banaskantha district, which shares a border with Pakistan's desert areas, came under fresh locust attacks in January (2020). In Gujarat, locust attacks in December(2019) damaged crops, mainly rapeseed and cumin seed, planted on about 17,000 hectares. Parts of western Rajasthan have destroyed crops spread over at least 350,000 hectares of land. The districts adversely affected by the large scale coordinated attacks by locusts include Sri Ganganagar, Jaisalmer, Barmer, Bikaner, Jodhpur, Churu and Nagaur. India has been able to bring swarms of desert locusts under control in two key oilseed producing states.

In May, amid the COVID-19 pandemic, parts of India such as Rajasthan and Madhya Pradesh were severely affected by locust swarms measuring a kilometer wide, the worst locust attack in 27 years. On 27 June 2020, millions of locusts swarmed on a massive scale in Gurgaon, Delhi-NCR region, made look like a sand storm in the sky.

==== Nepal ====
Swarms of the locusts were reported to have entered Nepal in late June 2020, with damage to crops in Parbat Mahashila.

=== South America ===
==== Argentina ====
On 17 June 2020, a swarm reached Argentina from Paraguay, reaching the Corrientes Province and by 22 June, it was making its way into the Entre Ríos Province, destroying corn and cassava crops along the way.

== Effects ==
Around 2.25m ha of land had already been affected as of April 2020. About 70,000 hectares (172,973 acres) of land in Kenya alone were infested. 20.2 million people are facing severe acute food insecurity in Ethiopia, Kenya, Somalia, South Sudan, Uganda, and Tanzania. If left unchecked, the number of locusts could grow by 500 times by June 2020, when drier weather will help bring the outbreak under control. 1 million ha of land has been targeted for rapid locust surveillance and control in the eight East African countries. 110,000 households have been targeted for rapid livelihoods protection in seven of the eight countries. “Effective control is estimated to be around $60m (£47m) but, if an upsurge occurs, the cost will soar to $500m.”

WFP estimates that long-term response and recovery costs could top US$1billion if swarm growth is not controlled. The World Bank estimates that in Africa alone, more than 90 million hectares of cropland and pasture are at risk and damages and losses could amount to as much as US$9 billion in coming years.

== Preventive measures ==
FAO said containing the plague will cost at least $138 million. So far, donors have pledged $52 million as of April 2020, $10m of which has come from the Bill and Melinda Gates Foundation. Failure means more hunger in a region already battered by conflict and climate shocks. Aerial and ground spraying combined with constant tracking of the swarms are viewed as the most effective strategies. But the travel restrictions during the COVID-19 pandemic have hindered the preventive measures.

In the winter breeding areas, control operations started in December 2018 in Eritrea and, to a lesser extent, in Sudan. They extended to Egypt and Saudi Arabia in January where they continued for several months before a further extension to spring breeding areas in Saudi Arabia (February–June), Iran (February–July) and Pakistan (March–July). Control operations were then undertaken in the summer breeding areas along both sides of the Indo-Pakistan border (May–February), Ethiopia (August onwards) and Yemen (July onwards). During the winter of 2019/2020, control was carried out along both sides of the Red Sea (November–March), the Horn of Africa (December–present) and southern Iran (November onwards). About 2.25 Mha had been treated by February 2020.

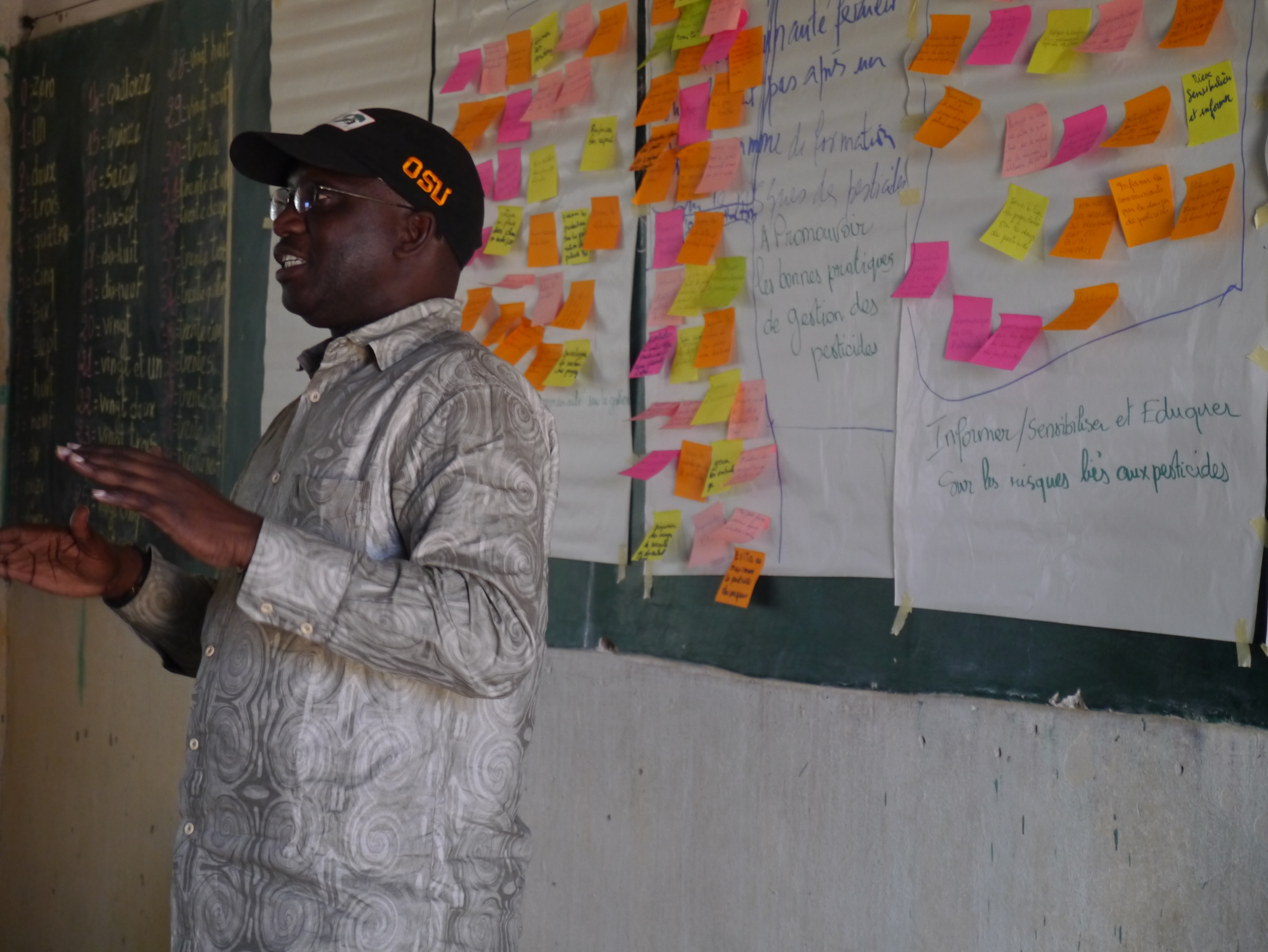
Man instructing a pesticide workshop in West Africa.

As of April 2020 Ethiopia was using five planes and Kenya six planes for spraying and four planes for surveying. But the Kenyan government says it needs 20 planes for spraying - and a continuous supply of the pesticide Fenitrothion. Kenya has trained more than 240 personnel from affected counties in monitoring of locust swarms. To help prevent and control outbreaks, authorities analyze satellite images, stockpile pesticides and conduct aerial spraying. The U.N. has allocated $10 million for aerial spraying.

At the Intergovernmental Authority on Development climate prediction and applications centre, based in Nairobi, researchers have been running a supercomputer model to predict breeding areas that may have been missed by ground monitoring. These areas could become sources of new swarms if not sprayed and create an upsurge. So if hoppers are stopped from adults this wouldn't lead to another cycle of infestation. The supercomputer, funded by £35m of UK aid as part of its Weather and Climate Information Services for Africa programme, has successfully forecast the movement of locusts using data such as wind speed and direction, temperature, and humidity. The model has achieved 90% accuracy in forecasting the future locations of the swarms.

Researchers are now inputting data on soil moisture and vegetation cover to help predict where eggs have been laid and are likely to hatch and thrive. This will then provide data on where African governments can direct their spraying efforts, helping to control the hoppers before they swarm. The Kenyan government is on high alert and effective control measures have been put in place.

The Israel government sent a support mission to Ethiopia in November 2020. A team of experts supplied and trained local communities in Somali region and in Addis Ababa to locate, map, and spray locust at nighttime using drones for surveying and mapping and ground sprayers for extermination.

The Chinese government announced in February 2020 it was sending a team of experts to neighbouring Pakistan to develop "targeted programmes" against the locusts and deploy 100,000 ducks.
