= 2019 Burundi landslides =

Natural disasters in Burundi

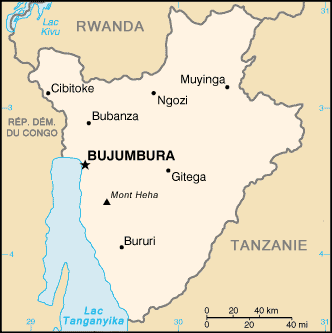
- Date: December 5, 2019
- Time: ≈16:00 (UTC+02:00)
- Location: Cibitoke, Bujumbura, Bubanza, and Cankuzo, Burundi; 2.8103°S 29.1856°E
- Type: Landslide, flash flood
- Cause: Soil erosion and unseasonably heavy rains
- Deaths: 41
- Injuries: 40
- Missing: 10

Burundi suffered a series of landslides in December 2019. On December 4, 2019, less than two months after the October celebration of the International Day for Disaster Risk Reduction (IDDRR), heavy rains precipitated the deadly series of landslides that followed later that night into the next day, affecting a total of 9,935 people in Nyempundu, Gikomero and Rukombe of the northwestern provinces of Cibitoke, bordering Rwanda, and Bubanza as well as the northeastern province of Cankuzo. At least 27 people died and 10 remained missing per the December 11 human toll. Seven injured persons were admitted into Cibitoke referral hospital, six of whom were discharged while the seventh was transferred to the Kigobe hospital managed by Médecins Sans Frontières/Doctors Without Borders-Burundi (MSF-B). Significant property damage was incurred as well, leaving 1,081 people (551 females and 530 males) of 206 households (on average, roughly five persons per household) displaced.

Another flood event happened on December 22 affecting 787 people in the northern neighborhoods in Bujumbura. As per the Burundi Red Cross Society (BRCS) Rapid Assessment, the December 22 floods disaster affected 219 households, completely destroyed 47 households, partially destroyed 40 households and submerged 132 households. 33 people were reported injured and 14 people dead.

== Background ==
Since January 2019, heavy rainfall had been triggering flash floods, mudslides and landslides in various provinces, especially Bujumbura (Mairie and Rural), Cibitoke, Bubanza, Muyinga, Cankuzo, and Muramvya provinces. Resultingly, almost 13,000 people were displaced, and 45 people died. Furthermore, these natural disasters caused extensive damage to local infrastructure systems, and hampered access to essential sources of food, water, education and healthcare. This also brought a heightened risk of the transmission of infectious disease due to the resulting proliferation of mosquitoes as vectors.

As of September 2019, there were 103,412 internally displaced persons (IDPs) in Burundi, of which roughly 79,600 or 77% were displaced due to natural disasters (including over 8,400 displaced since January 2019), mainly in the regions bordering Lake Tanganyika, and the north-western and central provinces, according to the International Organization for Migration's (IOM) Displacement Tracking Matrix.

According to the European Union's Directorate-General for European Civil-protection and Humanitarian-aid Operations (DG ECHO) the risk of natural disaster continued to increase day-by-day with the early onset of the Burundian September 2019 rainy season and above-average rainfall forecasted by the United States National Oceanic and Atmospheric Administration (US NOAA). The US Agency for International Development's (USAID's) Famine Early Warning Systems Network (FEWSNET) reported that the greater horn of Africa region received up to 300 per cent above average rainfall from October to mid-November 2019. UNOCHA considers Burundi to be among the twenty most vulnerable countries to climate change and natural hazards.

East Africa currently experiences unseasonably heavy rains caused by the higher-than-average temperatures of the Indian Ocean, potentially due to cyclical dipole weather phenomena and global warming. The heavy rains and previous floods which inflict Burundi appear to be the resulting manifestations of these factors.

According to a Save the Children count based on United Nations and government figures, more than 1,200 deaths across East and Southern Africa were caused by floods, landslides, and a cyclone in 2019. In addition, the UN found that floods displaced nearly half a million people in southern Sudan, 200,000 in Ethiopia and at least 370,000 in Somalia in 2019.

Soil erosion as a result of overgrazing and the expansion of agriculture into marginal lands, may have contributed to the Burundian susceptibility and vulnerability to devastating landslides.

The recently launched Global Humanitarian Overview (GHO) indicated that natural disasters posed substantial risks to the approximately 80 per cent of Burundians dependent on subsistence farming, and that 1.74 million people would need aid in 2020.

== Disaster ==
From December 4 onwards, at least a dozen hills around Nyempundu, in Mugina commune in Cibitoke, were collapsed by severely damaging landslides, precipitated by torrential rains.

An anonymous local Cibitoke provincial government official, reported to Reuters that victims were living on a hillside which gave way after the heavy rains of the day before. "They are still digging up dead bodies," the official said.

In an official Twitter post, the Ministry of Public Security confirmed that much property was damaged in the disaster, at least 26 people died and 10 were missing. According to another ministry spokesperson, Pierre Nkurikiye, other provisional police reports indicated the deaths of at least some 38 people (three in Gikomero, 13 in Rukombe and 22 died in Nyempundu), though these reports were still provisional, and as of then, excavation and search-and-rescue (SAR) operations were still ongoing.

Destruction and damage of key infrastructure – including homes, roads, and bridges – was reported. Over 80 houses, 6 bridges and roads, and 9 water access points were destroyed, and crops continued to be destroyed in the immediate aftermath.

== Response ==
On December 5, the provincial Cibitoke Governor Joseph Iteriteka addressed victims of the disaster, thanking everyone involved in the management of the disaster.

UNOCHA led an intersectoral team to gain access to hard-to-reach affected areas to evaluate the destruction. The international community's willingness to help the affected people was communicated in a December 6 meeting with the Government's Provincial Platform, led by the Governor's Counsellor in charge of social affairs. The Government of Burundi's Civil Protection and Disaster Management Unit, the public provincial and communal administration, the BRCS, the police, the army, the surrounding population, and the Cibitoke and Mugina Health Districts all deployed local emergency relief services. BRCS teams, coordinated by three staff members deployed 15 volunteers many of which were trained in first aid, and Water Sanitation and Hygiene (WASH) in emergencies.

The UNOCHA intersectoral team concluded that the most pressing necessities in order of priority were food and water, shelter and other non-food items (NFIs such as household, WASH, female dignity and school kits as well as monetary funds for such were provided by IOM, World Vision, BRCS, UNICEF, UNFPA, the USAID OFDA, Office of Foreign Disaster Assistance, and NGOs Help a Child, War Child Holland, Concern Worldwide & We World-GVC), psychosocial support, and access between hills and villages. Landslides washed away fields that were exploited by these populations, as well as their crops and food reserves, notably those by the Mubarazi river in Muramvya, and similarly much livestock. Water access points and sanitary facilities were washed away and what remained of them was under considerable strain due to high demand. There was also an elevated risk of waterborne diseases. The mission noted that physical access to schools in the Nyempundu area was hampered by landslides that cut off some roads, and that many schoolchildren in general lost their school materials.

On December 7, the National Platform for Disaster Management set up an ad hoc crisis management committee to manage the emergency headed by the Director of Humanitarian Action of the Ministry of Human Rights, Social Affairs and Gender. On the same day, 1,900 affected households received 28.5 tons of rice granted by the Ministry-led committee. This aid was deposited in the commune of Mugina, over 25 kilometers from the disaster site to which the beneficiaries had to travel to access. No provisions were made yet for people with special needs, and a relocation site identified in the village of Rusagara, not far from the shopping centre of the municipality of Mugina, was rejected for the second time by the BRCS.

On December 8, the ad hoc committee, noting that the response to needs would continue as sectors refined their data for a more consistent assistance, requested that the World Food Programme (WFP) carry out food assistance, which began to distribute 15-day rations of beans, corn, oil and salt on December 16, that the visit to the relocation site be conducted quickly and that support be provided to all victims of the rainy season. UNOCHA concluded its December 8 "Flash Update No. 2" saying "The humanitarian community will continue to work with the Government's National Platform to reinforce this emergency response, as well as with local municipalities that are willing to support these relief efforts."

A week after the landslide, the burial of the recovered bodies, arranged by the BRCS in cooperation with the various Partner National Societies (PNS) of the ICRC (Finnish Red Cross, Belgian Red Cross and East Africa Country Cluster Support Team), took place on December 12 in the Nyamakarabo area, but issues were still faced in the lack of assistance to the efforts of the authorities in conducting SAR operations, the extraction of corpses, and the evacuation of the wounded to nearby hospitals. In addition, access to the area remained hampered by landslides that damaged the roads and wooden bridges crossing the area that remained not allowing heavy machinery to pass through.

On December 16, the IOM began requesting support from the BRCS to both arrange the procurement and distribution of half of the household kits each and other NFIs to accommodate for the displaced households who, in the meantime, were temporarily relocated to various communal spaces (i.e churches and schools) or hosted by community members. In addition Burundi and the UNOCHA intersectoral team announced their intention to begin the rehabilitation of a collapsed dam and reorienting the river to its initial direction.

The IFRC concluded their operation four months following its beginning (December 23, 2019 - April 23, 2020), having allocated 82,628 Swiss Francs (~90,000 USD) to the disaster relief emergency fund (DREF).

== Aftermath ==
As of December 31, the UNHCR estimated there to be 209,179 Burundian people of concern in Tanzania. The rate of return of 2000 refugees per week planned by the Tanzanian and Burundian governments appear to have been strongly affected by the environmental situation. In November 2019 only one of the three transit centres was functioning, allowing only 409 Burundian refugees to return, the lowest rate since January that year.

The UN Food and Agricultural Organization (FAO) and Intergovernmental Authority on Development (IGAD) have both stated that the phenomenally heavy rains have contributed to a "serious and widespread desert locust outbreak". The Desert Locust Control Organization for Eastern Africa (the DLCO-EA which Burundi is not member to) noted the necessity for urgent and decisive action from all partners, as well as the resources to support large-scale ground surveys, aerial spraying services, provision of chemicals, information dissemination, and further capacity building for control operations.

Forecasted heavy rains accompanied by flash flooding continued into approximately January 9. Beyond that only moderately light rainfall was predicted and observed.

== See also ==
- 2018 East Africa floods
- Geography of Burundi
- 2017 DR Congo landslide

== Notes ==
a."Éboulement de terrains suite aux fortes pluies tombées hier à Nyempundu, Gikomero et Rukombe (zone Nyamakarabo, commune Mugina en @CibitokeProv ) : 26 morts, 07 blessés et 10 personnes non-encore retrouvées. Des maisons, champs et biens aussi endommagés. Fouilles en cours." (French)
Translation: "Landslide following heavy rains that fell yesterday in Nyempundu, Gikomero and Rukombe (Nyamakarabo zone, Mugina commune in @CibitokeProv): 26 dead, 07 injured and 10 people not yet found. Houses, fields and property also damaged. Excavations in progress."
