= Food security in Ethiopia =

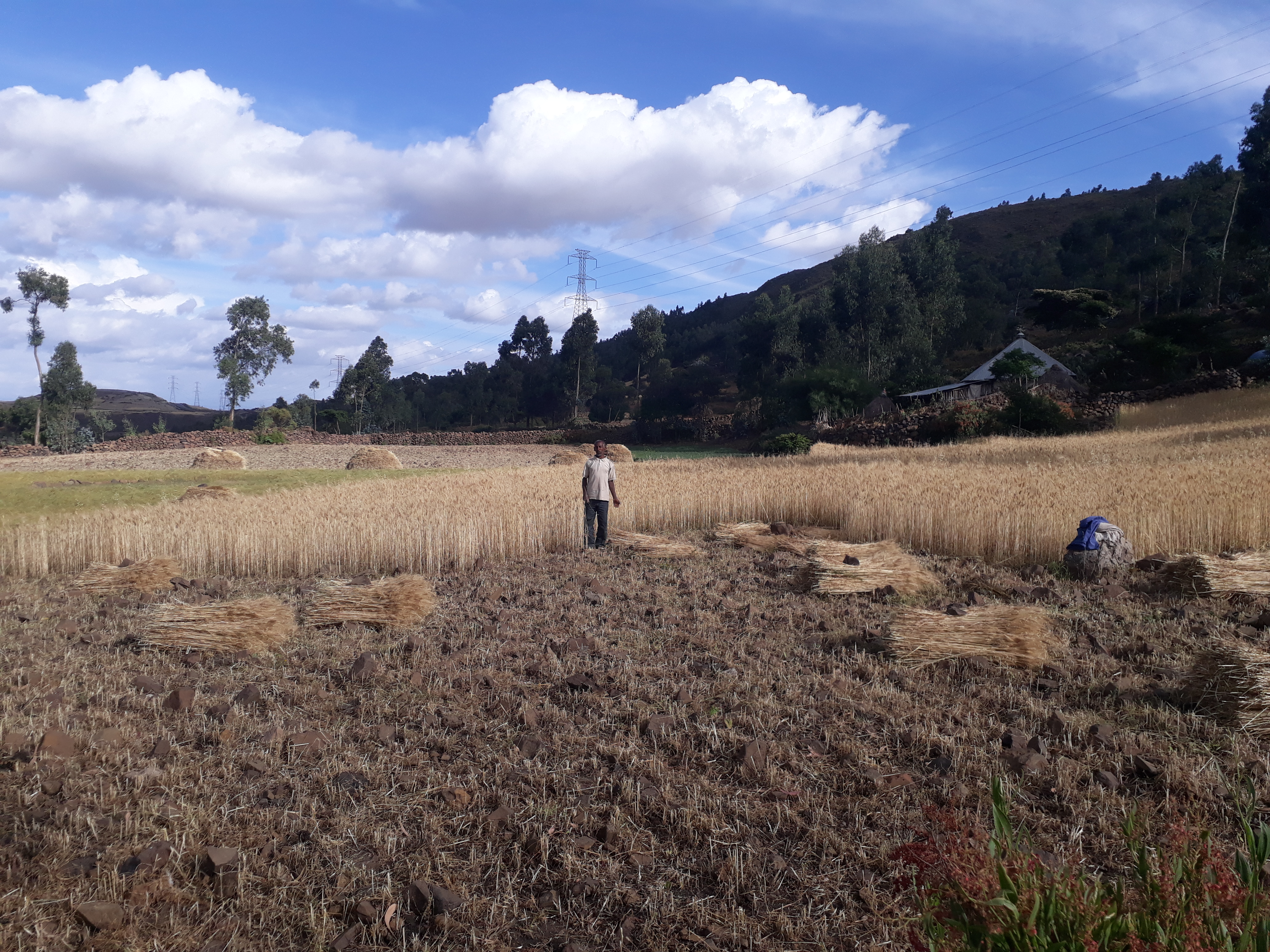
Crop harvesting in Khunale

Food security is defined, according to the World Food Summit of 1996, as existing "when all people at all times have access to sufficient, safe, nutritious food to maintain a healthy and active life". This commonly refers to people having "physical and economic access" to food that meets both their nutritional needs and food preferences. Today, Ethiopia faces high levels of food insecurity, ranking as one of the hungriest countries in the world, with an estimated 5.2 million people needing food assistance in 2010. Ethiopia was ranked 92 in the world in Global Hunger Index 2020.

The Human Rights Measurement Initiative finds that Ethiopia is fulfilling 61.5% of what it should be fulfilling for the right to food based on its level of income.

== Background ==
Accounting for 84% of the country's labor force, agriculture in Ethiopia is the largest contributor to economic growth and the economy's most important sector. Especially among the poverty-stricken rural population, the livelihood of most Ethiopians depends on agriculture. Although it is a country with "significant agricultural potential because of its water resources, its fertile land areas, and its large labor pool," this potential goes largely undeveloped. Ethiopian agriculture is incredibly sensitive to shifts in weather. When rainfall is erratic or insufficient for even a few successive rainy seasons, the entire country is prone to falling into famine. The most highly publicized example of this is 1984, when Ethiopia experienced one of its worst droughts in recent history and hundreds of thousands of people (one million people is the estimate most often cited) died or became destitute due to the famine that ensued.

== Current statistics in 2010 ==
According to an early 2010 report, 5.2 million people in Ethiopia face a precarious food security situation. The worsening food security situation is attributed primarily to poor rainfall last year during the February–May and June–October seasons. A series of successive droughts had already weakened Ethiopia's food situation, with "poor and erratic rainfall over the last two years." Global conditions such as the high food and fuel prices that have persisted in the country since the 2008 financial crisis have also contributed to Ethiopia's failing food security. Ethiopia is considered a least developed country ranked 171 out of 182 countries in the UNDP Human Development Index for 2009. In the 2010 Global Hunger Index, which ranks developing countries and countries in transition based on proportion of undernourished people, proportion of underweight children under five, and child mortality rate, Ethiopia was given a 29.8, on a scale of 0-100, with 0 being the best and 100 the worst possible score. Ethiopia is one of the countries that made the most absolute progress improving its score between 1990 and 2010; in 1990 it had a score of 43.7, and now it's down to 29.8. However, this score is still highly troubling – it's currently ranked 80th out of 84 countries.

The level of hunger in Ethiopia can also be measured based on child growth, which is "internationally recognized as an important indicator of nutritional status and health in populations." In 2005, 20% of babies had low birth weight (less than 2500g at birth). 53.5% of children under five and 30.6% of pregnant women were anemic. 34.6% of children were considered underweight, which contributes to child mortality, since "evidence has shown that the mortality risk of children who are even mildly underweight is increased, and severely underweight children are at even greater risk." 50.7% of children suffered from growth retardation as a result of inadequate diets, and 12.3% were "wasting", which refers to a condition brought on by severe under-nutrition and causes permanent impairment of the immune system, making them much more susceptible to infectious diseases and death. These high levels of under-nutrition, particularly in children and mothers, have serious implications for Ethiopia's future. High child mortality, impaired immune system, and the results of stunting due to inadequate diet, which include delayed mental development and intellectual capacity and decreased performance in school, have long-term effects, not only for those children but for economic productivity as a whole. Small, undernourished women are also more likely to experience complications in during childbirth, and are more likely to give birth to low birth-weight babies, further "contributing to the intergenerational cycle of malnutrition".

== Current statistics in 2020 ==
Hunger and undernutrition rates according to the Global Hunger Index (GHI) have decreased from 2000-2020. The Global Hunger Index for Ethiopia in 2000 was 53.7 and in 2020 it is 26.2. Ethiopia's recent economic growth has improved its Global Index Score. The improvement in the economic trends are due to the growth in agriculture which plays a dominant role in Ethiopia's economy. This score indicates improvement, however, the score is still considered to be serious. Ethiopia ranks 92 out of 107 countries with sufficient data to calculate 2020 GHI scores.

The Human Development Reports provided by the United Nations Development Programme (UNDP) ranks child malnutrition by moderate to severe in children under age 5. In the most recent report with data collected from 2010-2018, Ethiopia had a score of 38.4 in Human Development. The scores in Human Development are classified by the percentage of children under age 5 who are more than two standard deviations below the median height-for-age of the reference population according to the World Health Organization Child Growth Standards (WHO). A score of 38.4 indicates "low human development" and it classifies Ethiopia as a developing country.

== Current statistics in 2022 ==
An estimate of about 50 million people living in the Eastern part of Africa are likely to suffer food insecurity in the first quarter of 2022. About 10-15 million Ethiopians are in need of food assistance. The low supply of fertilizers for farming in the northern part of Ethiopia has led to more threat on food security.

== International aid and development projects ==
=== United Nations Development Programme ===
Ending hunger internationally is a major part of the United Nations Millennium Development Goals. The first goal is to "eradicate extreme poverty and hunger", and the fourth is to "reduce child mortality rate", in which preventing malnutrition in mothers and children is integral. In order to fulfill these goals in Ethiopia, in 2007 the United Nations Development Programme (UNDP) developed the Food Security and Recovery Project, which is intended to run from January 2007 to December 2011 and to "contribute to the achievement of food security in the country including disaster risk management and early recovery capacities." It is designed to promote institutional coordination and community participation in order to achieve disaster risk reduction and food security. By 2011, UNDP hopes to significantly strengthen Ethiopian government capacity to take appropriate action to respond to emergency situations, ensuring the population's survival and recovery. They delivered $725,000, $6,815,000.00 and $4,538,000, in 2007, 2008, and 2009 respectively.

As part of the Food Security and Recovery Project, UNDP also supports the Ethiopia Commodity Exchange (ECX), the country's first formal, organized marketplace. Located in Ethiopia's capital city, Addis Ababa, ECX is intended to give buyers and sellers a place to trade, "assured of quality, quantity, payment, and delivery", by informing them of commodity prices throughout the country, and guaranteeing payment and delivery on transactions made through the exchange. Since its founding in April 2008, ECX has become fully operational, currently trading coffee, sesame, haricot beans, maize, and wheat. With the help of UNDP, they also organized an Africa-wide Knowledge Sharing Forum entitled "The Making of a Market: Global Learning from Commodity Exchange Experiences" and hosted the first Africa commodity exchange meeting, which included representatives from twelve other African countries.

=== World Bank ===
The World Bank also supports development of food security in Ethiopia. In 2010 World Bank approved a plan to devote $150 million to the Ethiopian government ($108.4 million of which as credit and $41.6 million as a grant) "to support increased agricultural productivity, enhanced market access for key crop and livestock products, and improved food security". The Agricultural Growth Program (AGP) was designed to target high-potential districts and, in an attempt to "increase resilience to climate variability and promote jobs and small business development", it is supposed to increase the participation of Ethiopians themselves, mostly farmers, women, and children, in defining specifically what support they need to achieve these goals. According to the World Bank, the AGP will support the Ethiopian government in developing food security and sustainability in five ways:

- "Providing farmers with improved access to knowledge and information, market, finance and other services through support from key public and private institutions, including farmer organizations and public advisory services
- Increasing agricultural productivity and household income by scaling up best practices among farmers and rural businesses as well as in public sector institutions
- Strengthening value chains to increase the value and volume of sales of key selected agricultural commodities;
- Supporting small-scale agricultural water development and management that would strengthen the management of micro-watersheds and thereby increase agricultural production and income, reduce environmental degradation, and mitigate weather-induced risks including those related to climate change; and
- Supporting the establishment or upgrading of rural roads and physical markets to improve market access for agricultural produce and, thereby, farmers' income."

. The world bank has provided a loan of $2.3 billion dollars to help mitigate the scourge of food insecurity is Eastern and Southern Africa

=== Productive safety net programme ===
Founded in January 2005, The Productive Safety Net Programme (PSNP) is the second-largest social transfer program in Africa (after South Africa). Its goal is to "tackle chronic food insecurity and break Ethiopia's dependence on food aid". Traditionally, food insecurity in Ethiopia was primarily addressed by deployments of "emergency" food aid. However, over the last decade these "emergencies" have become a chronic, rather than transitory, condition. Every year from 1994 to 2003 emergency food aid was mobilized for more than five million Ethiopians, and despite these yearly efforts, the rural population remained as vulnerable as ever to food insecurity. The PSNP is designed to respond to this problem, aiming to provide "predictable transfers to meet predictable needs". Supported by international aid, the Ethiopian government gives support to chronically food-insecure households for six months of the year for up to five years, so that these households are able to build up their resilience against shocks like drought or rise in food prices that traditionally cause food emergencies requiring tremendous financial assistance. "Although emergency relief would continue to be required in years of severe shocks, if the PSNP is successful then millions of people would be removed from the annual emergency appeal process, and there would be a gradual shift towards a flexible multi-year safety net that expands and contracts according to need".

PSNP was born in 2005 out of deliberations of the government of Ethiopia, UN organizations such as UN-OCHA (Office for the Coordination of Humanitarian Affair), and international NGOs. The PSNP system is rooted in the FSP(Food Security Programme) as an initiative of the World Bank and IMF championed Ethiopian Poverty Reduction strategy with an annual budget of US$107 million.

The PSNP aims to provide a security against abrupt income changes. In addition, it ties relief to development by giving food aid in exchange for labor effort to construct public works. Since the efficiency and standard of outputs on public work have been typically low and maintenance on the infrastructure insufficient, food aid has been given as an incentive to work on them. To its government, this is one way of bridging relief to development. It includes many building blocks guided towards local development; block grants are made accessible to workdays for activities such as water harvesting, irrigation, feeder roads and household agricultural packages and direct, unconditional payments for elderly, the handicapped, pregnant women.

Evaluations by the International Food Policy Research Institute (IFPRI) show that PSNP is well-targeted towards the most food insecure and poorest households residing in the areas in which the program operates and that the program has improved household food security and expenditures.
