= Burundi Red Cross =

- Industry: Humanitarian organization
- Founded: 1963
- Headquarters: Bujumbura
- Number of employees: 647 employees and 600,000+ volunteers
- Website: www.croixrouge.bi

Burundi Red Cross, also known as BRC (French: Croix-Rouge du Burundi, CRB) was founded in 1963, formed on the basis of the 1949 Geneva Conventions and the 1977 Additional Protocols. It maintains headquarters in Bujumbura, Burundi.

The BRC was involved in the disaster management response to the 2019 Burundi landslides, specifically the immediate situation assessment of the casualties, relocation, and provision of material aid to displaced persons as well as the burial of recovered bodies. The organisation is currently involved in the management of the COVID-19 pandemic.
