= Phonolite series in North Ethiopia =

Phonolite Series
- Stratigraphic range: Middle Miocene
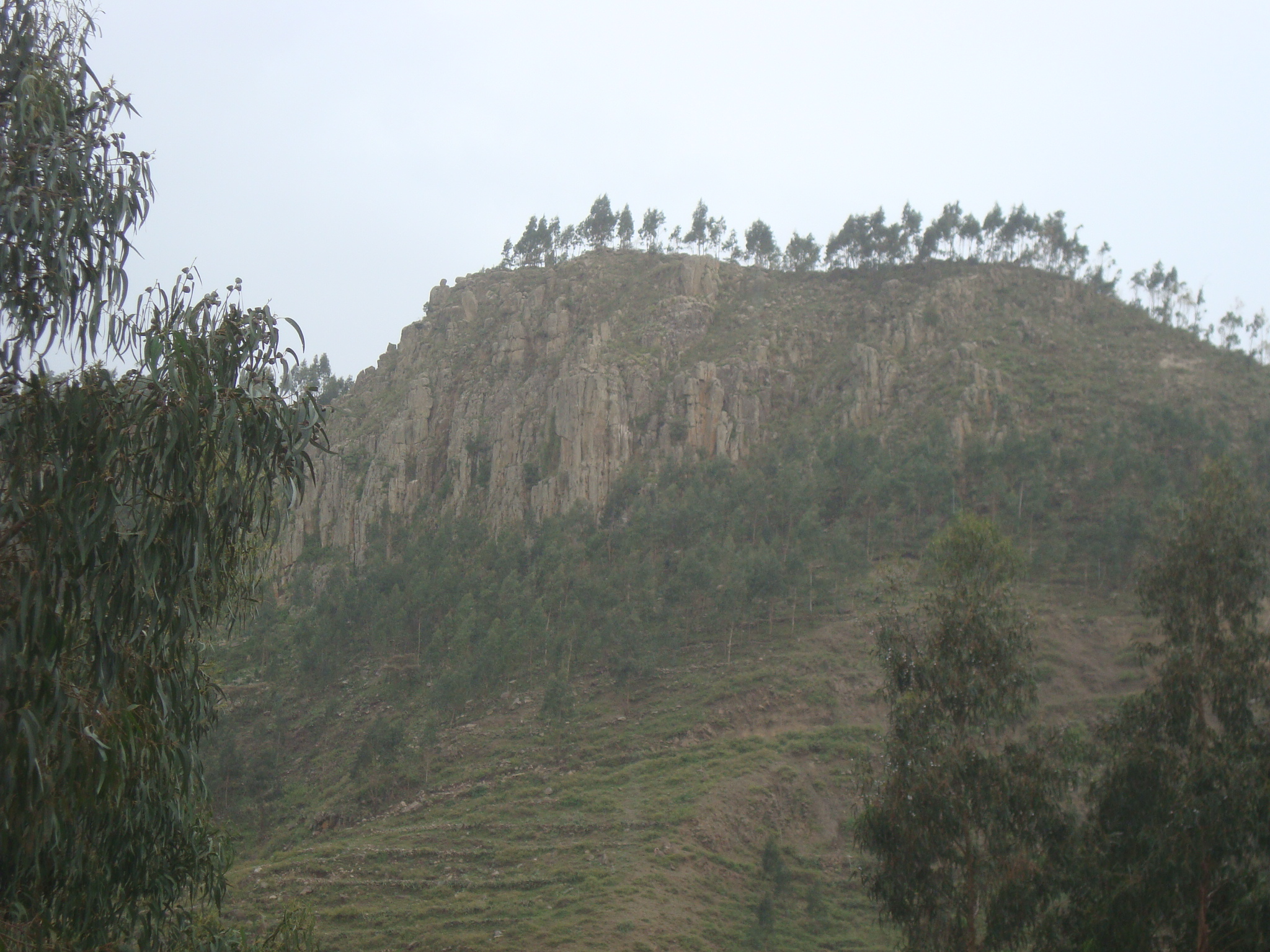
- Plug at Addi Amyuq in Dogu’a Tembien
- Type: Geological formation
- Overlies: Tertiary Basalts

Lithology
- Primary: Phonolite

Location
- Coordinates: 14.158°N 38.945°E
- Approximate paleocoordinates: 0°N 0°E
- Region: Tigray
- Country: Ethiopia
- Extent: Aksum-Adwa-Dogu’a Tembien
- Phonolite series in North Ethiopia (Ethiopia)

The phonolite or clinkstone of northern Ethiopia is a shallow-seated igneous rock. The phonolites intruded and punctured the Mesozoic sedimentary rocks and the Tertiary flood basalts some 19 to 11 million years ago.

== Stratigraphic context ==
The formation occurs as plugs that have punctured the Tertiary flood basalts of the Ethiopian plateau, and form the highest peaks in their surrounding.

== Lithology ==
These phonolites are composed of alkali pyroxenes and nephelines; there are also elongated plagioclase crystals. Pyroxenes have a skeletal texture, whereas nepheline crystals are hexagonal to rectangular. The phonolites of pink to light grey colour. The outcrops hold massive (up to 25 metres long), moderately weathered blocks, generally of elongated shape; in some locations it also forms spherical outcrops.

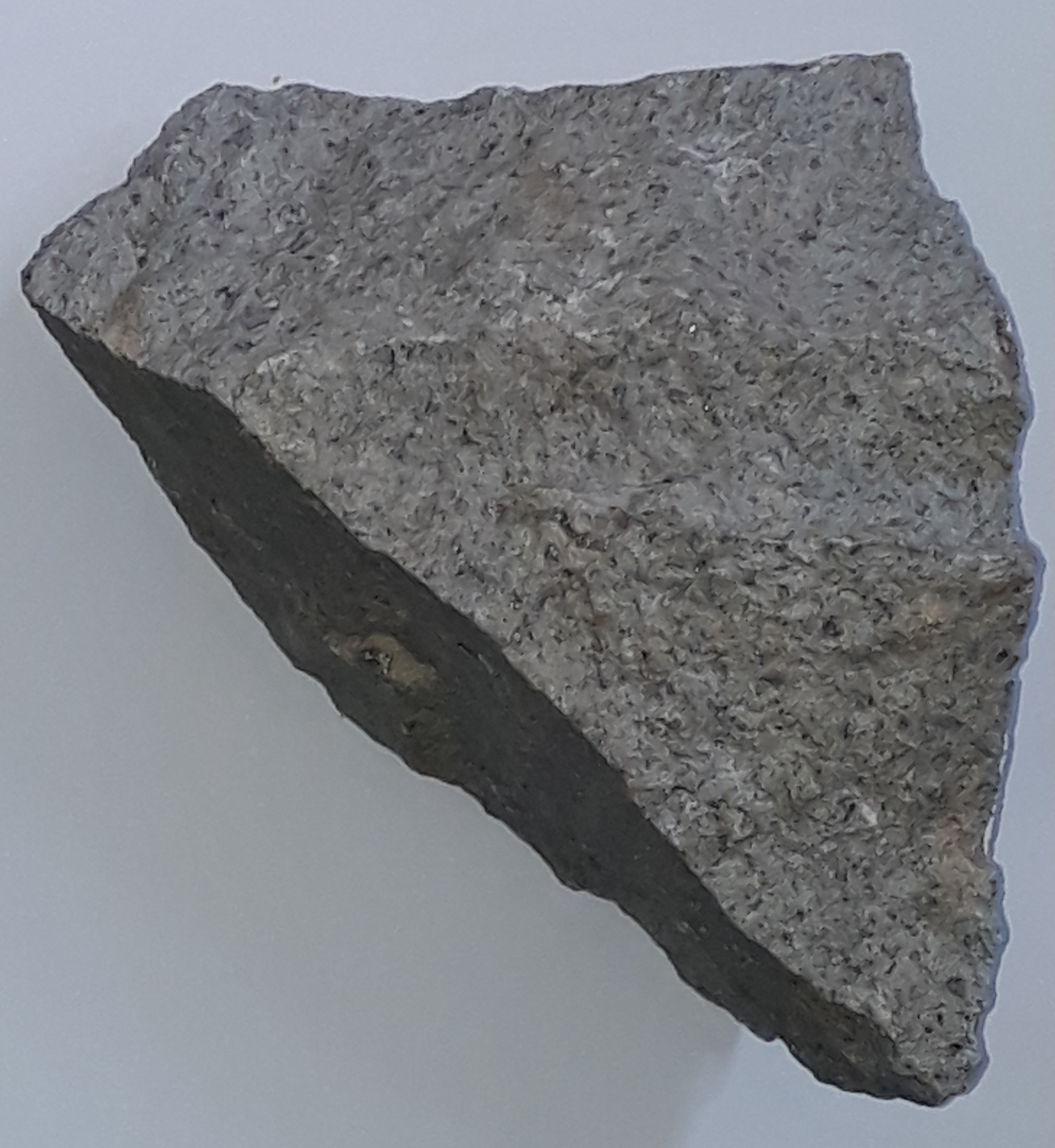
Rock sample of phonolite in Addi Amyuq

== Geographical extent ==
These silica-poor rocks belong to the Adwa-Aksum trachy-phonolite volcanic field. They are also exposed in Addi Amyuq, some 3 kilometres north of Hagere Selam, on the northern slope of the ridge. The morphology of the Addi Amyuq phonolite outcrop is similar to that of Gobo Dura where the Aksum obelisks were quarried.

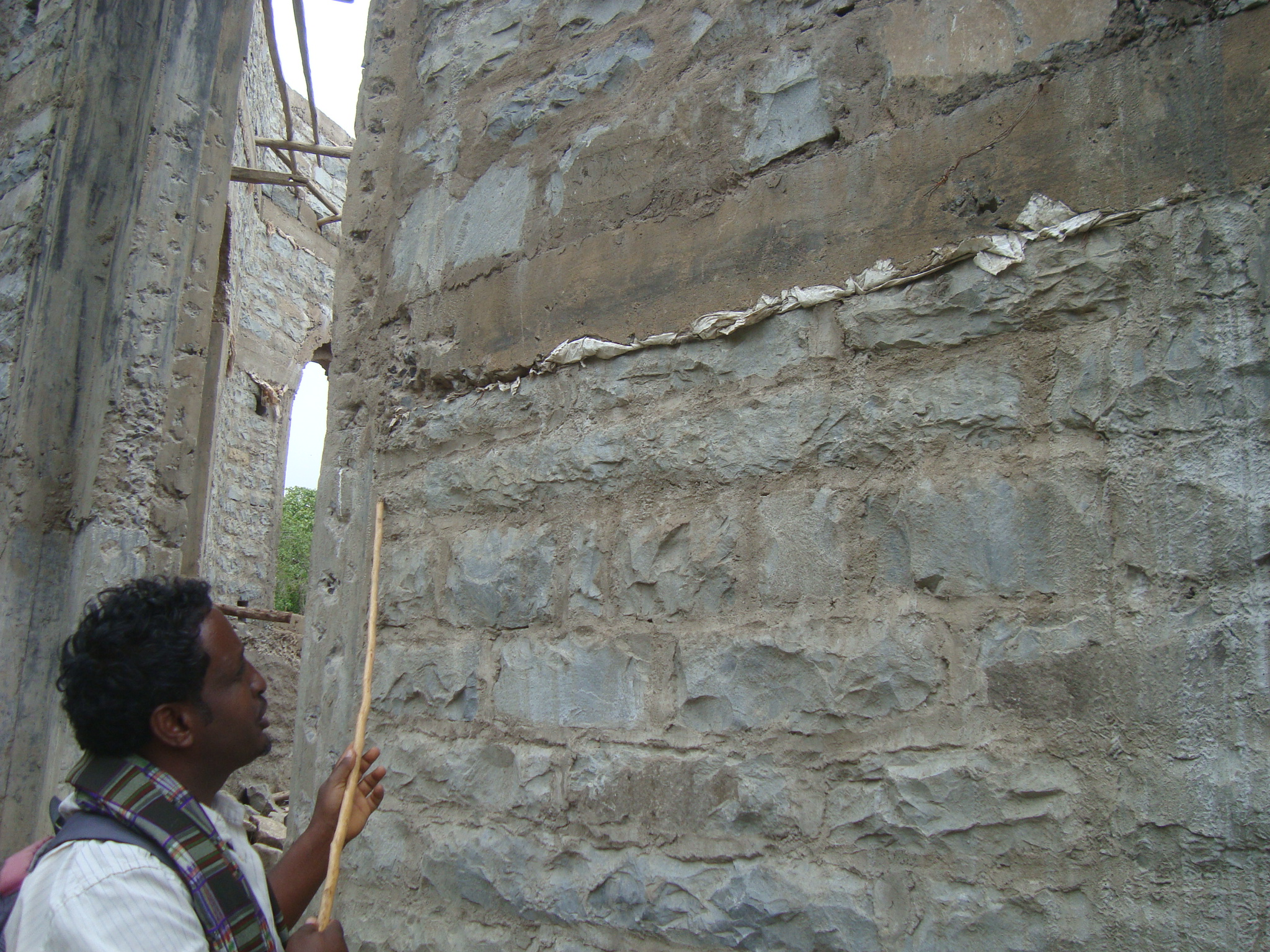
Phonolite used as dimension stone for church building in Khunale, Dogu’a Tembien district. The stick points to a 1.4-metre-long (4.6 ft) dimension stone

== Obelisks and church bells ==
The phonolites are among the best exploited rocks of northern Ethiopia. Notably, they were used to carve the monolithic obelisks and other monumental stones during the Aksumite kingdom. In Tembien they are used as church bells (in line with the name clinkstone) and dimension stones.
