= Khunale exclosure =

Exclosure for woodland restoration in Ethiopia

- Location within Ethiopia
- Location: Selam municipality, in Dogu’a Tembien district, Ethiopia
- Nearest city: Hagere Selam
- Coordinates: 13.664°N 39.185°E
- Established: 1990

Khunale is an exclosure located in the Dogu'a Tembien woreda of the Tigray Region in Ethiopia. The area has been protected since 1990 by the local community.

== Environmental characteristics ==
- Aspect: the exclosure is oriented towards the northwest
- Minimum altitude: 2420 metres
- Maximum altitude: 2480 metres
- Lithology: mixed sandstone and limestone lithology, partly covered by transported vertic clay material

== Management ==
As a general rule, cattle ranging and wood harvesting are not allowed. The grasses are harvested once yearly and taken to the homesteads of the village to feed livestock. Physical soil and water conservation has been implemented to enhance infiltration, and vegetation growth.

== Benefits for the community ==
Setting aside such areas fits with the long-term vision of the communities were hiza’iti lands are set aside for use by the future generations. It has also direct benefits for the community:

- improved infiltration
- improved ground water availability
- honey production
- climate ameliorator (temperature, moisture)
- carbon sequestration, dominantly sequestered in the soil, and additionally in the woody vegetation)

== Water conservation ==
In the Khunale exclosure, more than 600 precise measurements were done in 2003 and 2004, using seven runoff plots, where the volume of runoff was measured daily. The rock type (Amba Aradam Sandstone and Antalo Limestone), slope gradient and slope aspect were the same, the only difference was the land management and vegetation density. Whereas in degraded rangeland, 11.8% of the rainfall flows directly away to the river (runoff coefficient), this happens only for 4.7% of the rain in a recent exclosure and 0.3% in an old exclosure.

== Improved ecosystem ==
With vegetation growth, biodiversity in this exclosure has strongly improved: there is more varied vegetation and wildlife.

In the oldest parts of this exclosure, humus profiles are best developed. The old exclosures are also characterised by a variety of humus forms, caused by the variation in shrub and tree density and species composition.
