= Lioness of Gobedra =

Ethiopian rock sculpture

Coordinates: 14°7′N 38°41′E

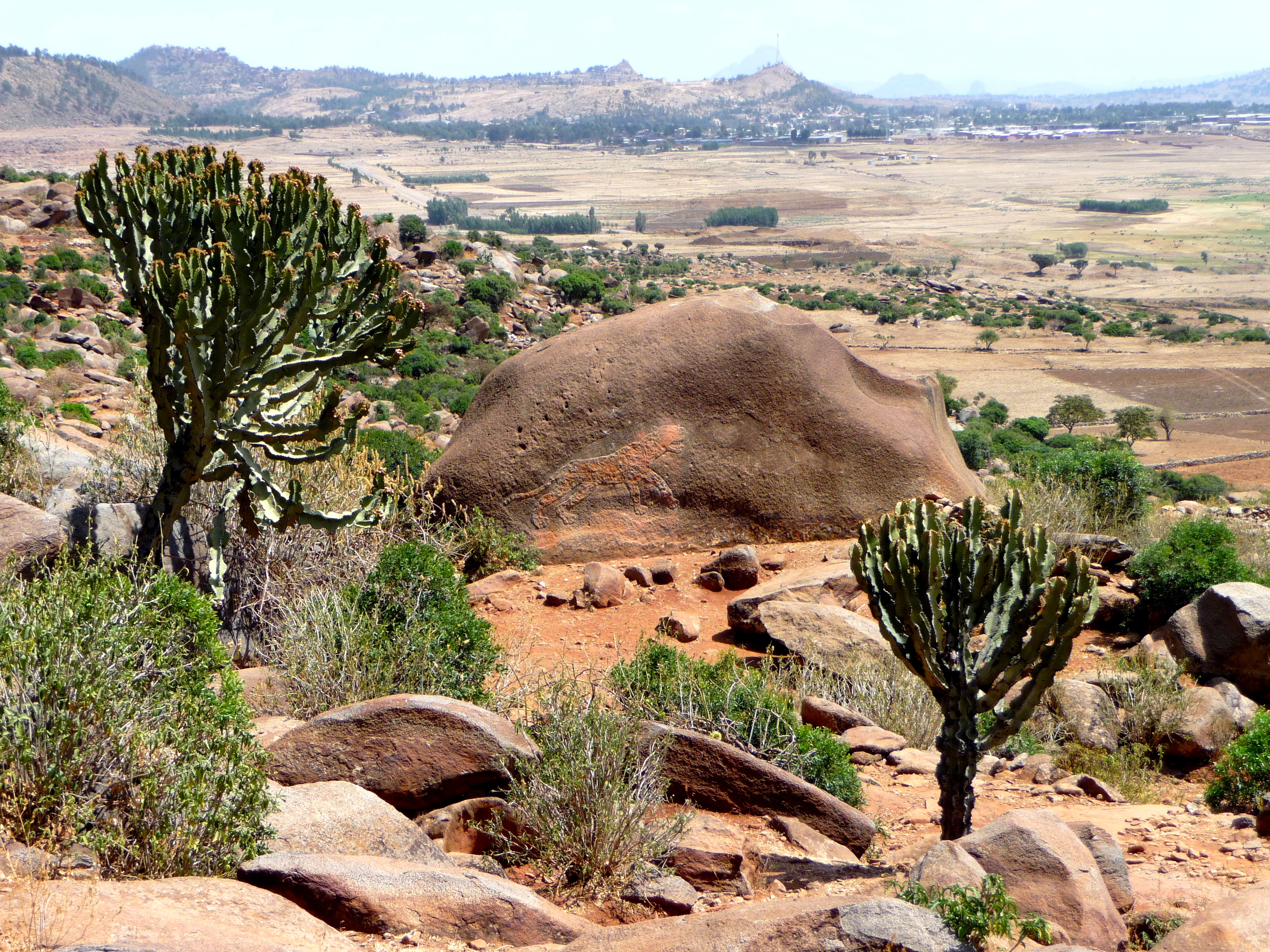
- The Lioness of Gobedra
- Location: Gobo Dura (Gobedra), Ethiopia

The Lioness of Gobedra is a rock sculpture located in Gobo Dura (Gobedra), Ethiopia. It is a representation of a crouching lioness around three metres long, which was carved into a relief on a large phonolite rock outcropping situated two kilometers west of Axum. It was first described by German archeologists in 1913.

The reason for this isolated stone carving is unknown, but the subject of much speculation. A local story, according to Philip Briggs, is that Archangel Michael was attacked by a lion here, and "he repelled the lion with such force it left an outline in the rock." Not far away is a quarry, where the stelae that adorn Axum are thought to have been carved, and there is a partially-carved example of one.
