= May Meqa =

River in the Tembien highlands of Ethiopia

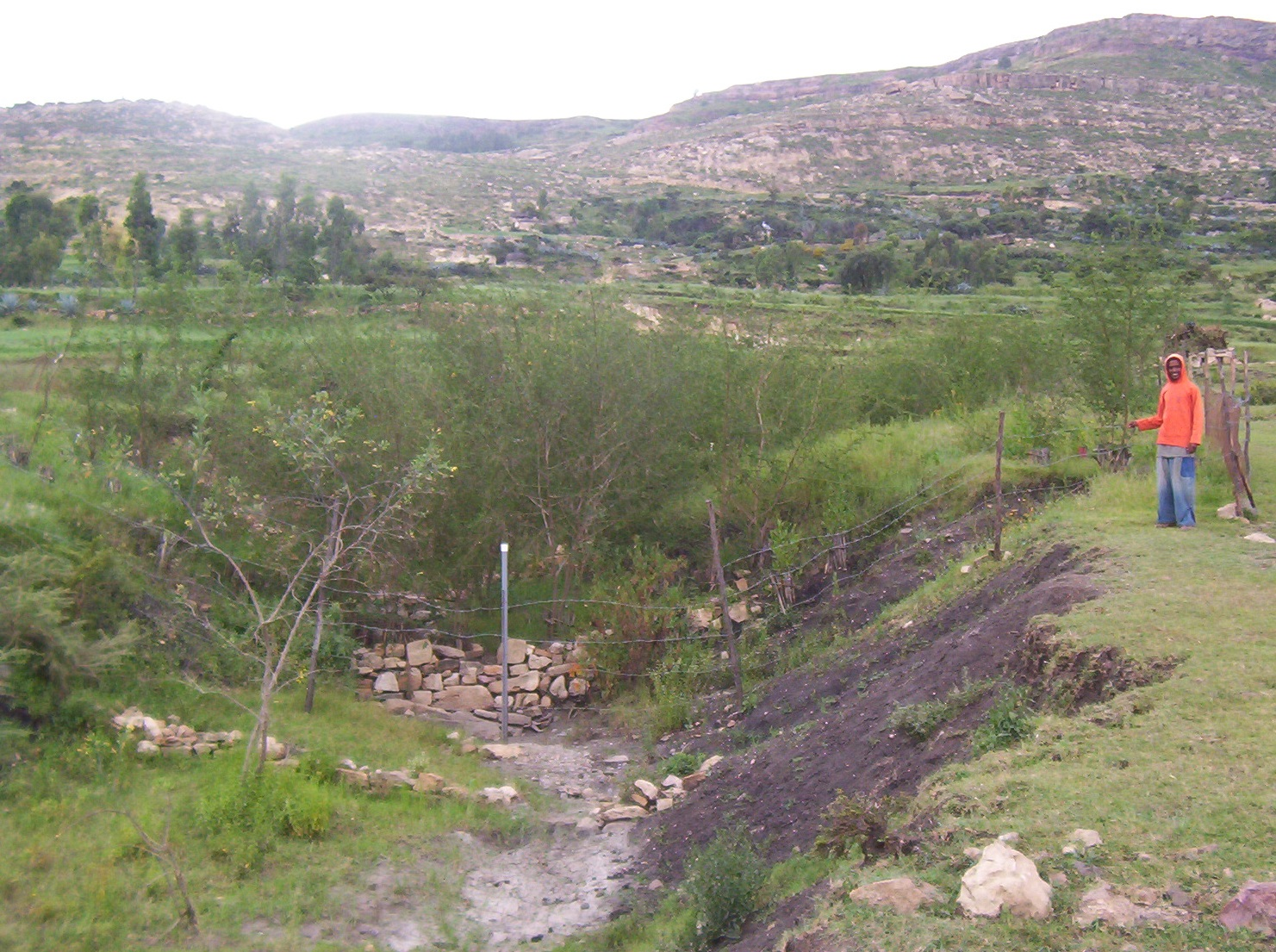
- The May Meqa River at Addi Werho, with biological control

- May Meqa River in Dogu’a Tembien

Location
- Country: Ethiopia
- Region: Tigray Region
- District (woreda): Dogu’a Tembien

Physical characteristics
- Source: May Tsahli
  - location: Miheno in Selam municipality
  - elevation: 2,390 m (7,840 ft)
- Mouth: Tinsehe River
  - location: Tinsehe in Selam municipality
  - coordinates: 13.695°N 39.19°E
  - elevation: 2,170 m (7,120 ft)
- Length: 5.5 km (3.4 mi)
- Width
  - average: 8 m (26 ft)

Basin features
- River system: Seasonal river
- Bridges: Tinsehe (rural road)
- Topography: Mountains and deep gorges

The May Meqa is a river of the Nile basin. Rising in the mountains of Dogu’a Tembien in northern Ethiopia, it flows northward to empty finally in the Weri’i and Tekezé River.

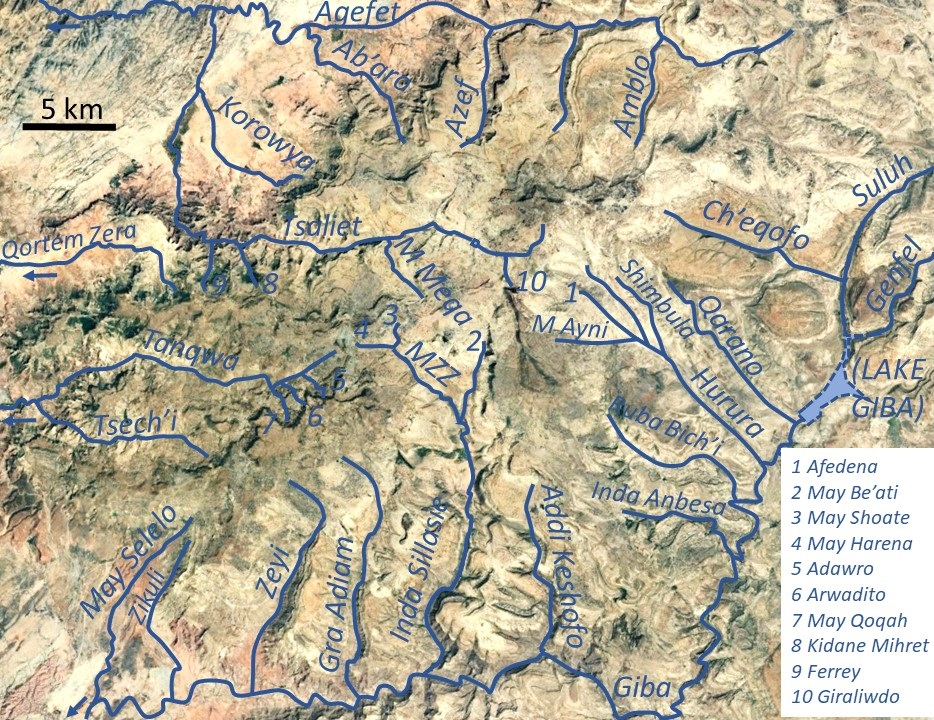
The river in the radial drainage network of Dogu’a Tembien

== Characteristics ==
It is a confined ephemeral river, locally meandering in its narrow alluvial plain, with an average slope gradient of 40 metres per kilometre. The May Meqa changes names along is course: the upper part, in Miheno is called May Tsahli, the middle part in Addi Werho May Meqa, and the lower part, near the mouth May Mugda. The mouth is just 50 metres upstream from Tinsehe waterfall

== Flash floods and flood buffering ==
Runoff mostly happens in the form of high runoff discharge events that occur in a very short period (called flash floods). These are related to the steep topography, often little vegetation cover and intense convective rainfall. The peaks of such flash floods have often a 50 to 100 times larger discharge than the preceding baseflow. The magnitude of floods in this river has however been decreased due to interventions in the catchment. On other steep slopes, exclosures have been established; the dense vegetation largely contributes to enhanced infiltration, less flooding and better baseflow. Physical conservation structures such as stone bunds and check dams also intercept runoff. Efforts have been done to establish biological control measurements (tree plantation) in the river bed.

== Boulders and pebbles in the river bed ==
Boulders and pebbles encountered in the river bed can originate from any location higher up in the catchment. In the uppermost stretches of the river, only rock fragments of the upper lithological units will be present in the river bed, whereas more downstream one may find a more comprehensive mix of all lithologies crossed by the river. From upstream to downstream, the following lithological units occur in the catchment.

- Lower basalt
- Amba Aradam Formation
- Antalo Limestone
- Quaternary freshwater tufa

== Trekking along the river ==
Trekking routes have been established across and along this river. The tracks are not marked on the ground but can be followed using downloaded .GPX files. Trek 23 follows the river over most of its length.

== See also ==
- List of Ethiopian rivers
