= Selam (Dogu'a Tembien) =

Municipality in Ethiopia

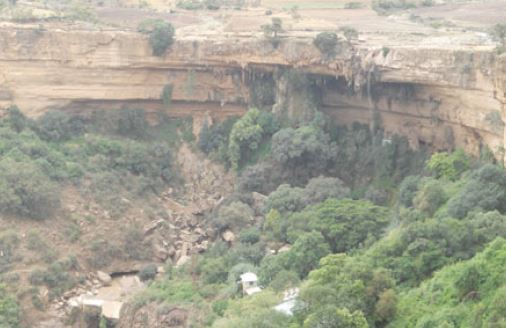
- Tinsehe waterfall

- Location within Ethiopia
- Coordinates: 13°40′N 39°12′E
- Country: Ethiopia
- Region: Tigray
- Zone: Debub Misraqawi (Southeastern)
- Woreda: Dogu'a Tembien

Area
  - Total: 17.77 km^{2} (6.86 sq mi)
- Elevation: 2,400 m (7,900 ft)

Population (2007)
  - Total: 3,855
  - Density: 217/km^{2} (560/sq mi)
- Time zone: UTC+3 (EAT)

Selam is a tabia or municipality in the Dogu'a Tembien district of the Tigray Region of Ethiopia. The tabia centre is in Addi Werho village, located approximately 3 km to the northeast of the woreda town Hagere Selam.

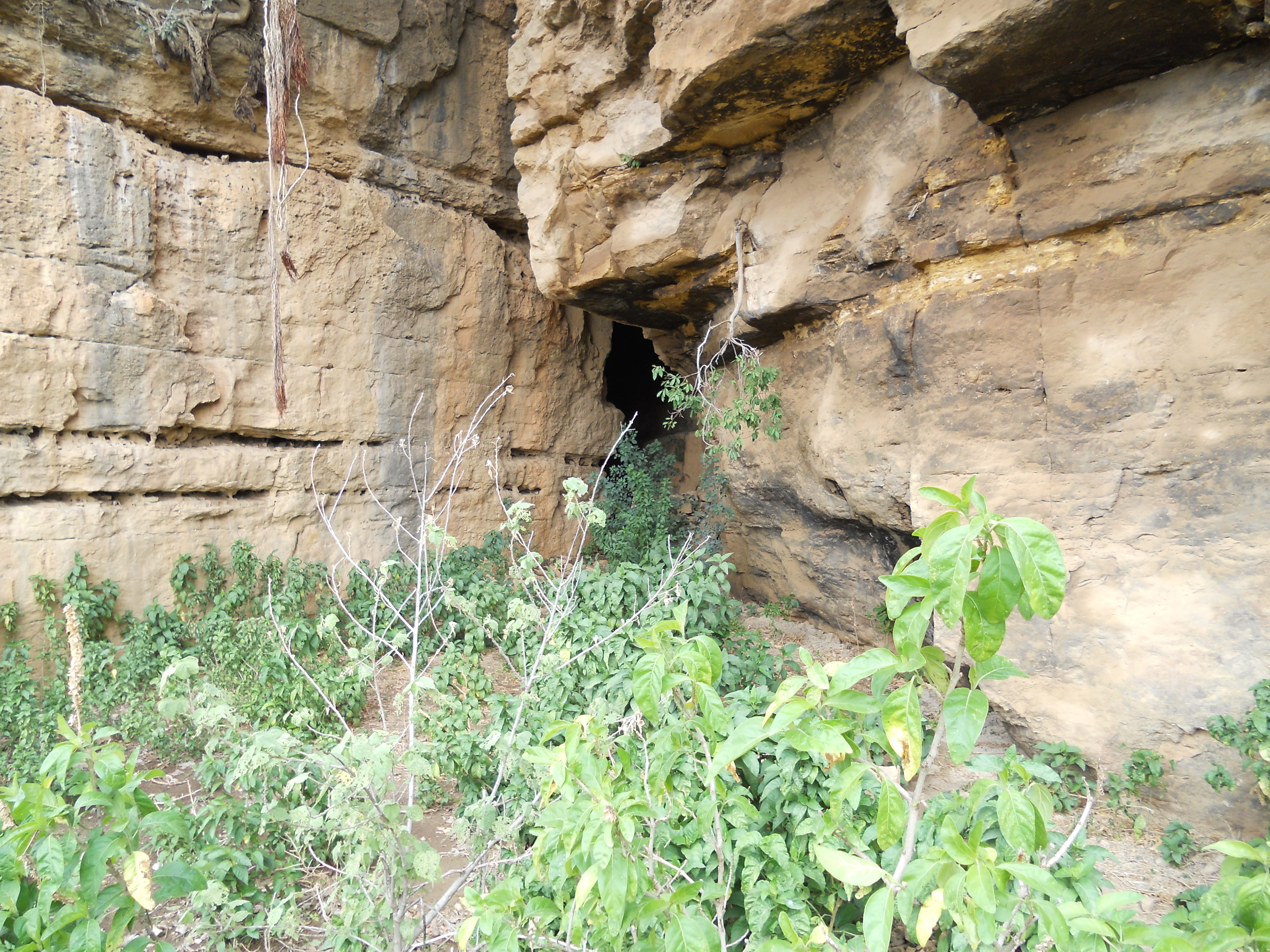
Cave entrance in Tinsehe Antalo Limestone

== Geography ==
The tabia stretches down north of the ridge occupied by the main road towards the Tinsehe gorge. The highest peak is Imba Khoboro (2,730 m a.s.l.) and the lowest place at the foot of the waterfall in Tinsehe (2,000 m a.s.l.).

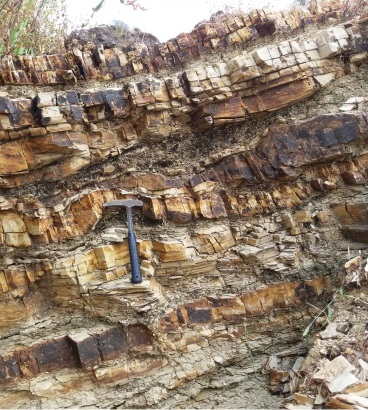
Intravolcanic sedimentary rock at Ksad Addi Amyuq roadcut

=== Geology ===
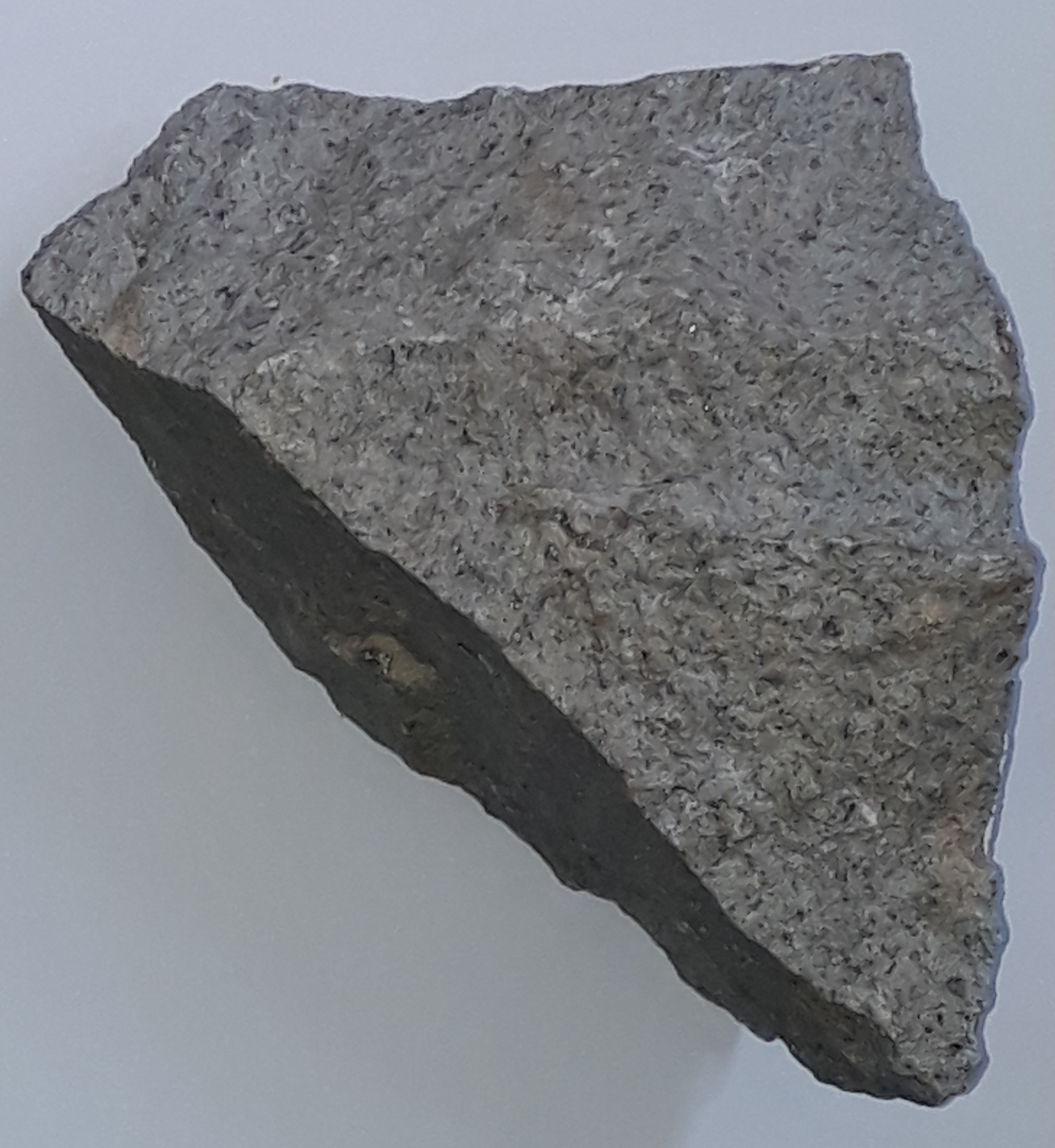
Rock sample of phonolite, collected at Addi Amyuq

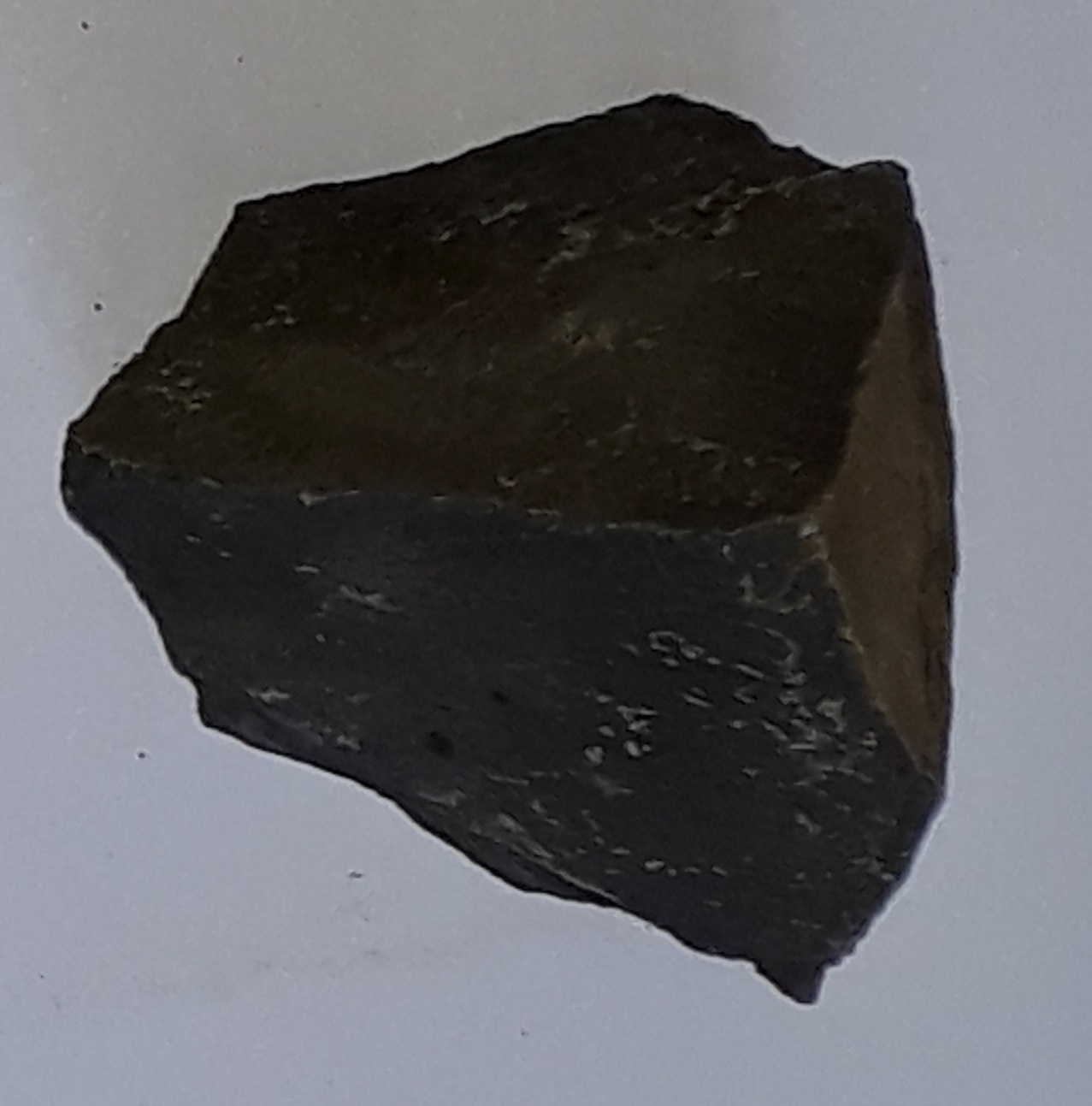
Rock sample collected from the Upper basalt at Addi Amyuq pass

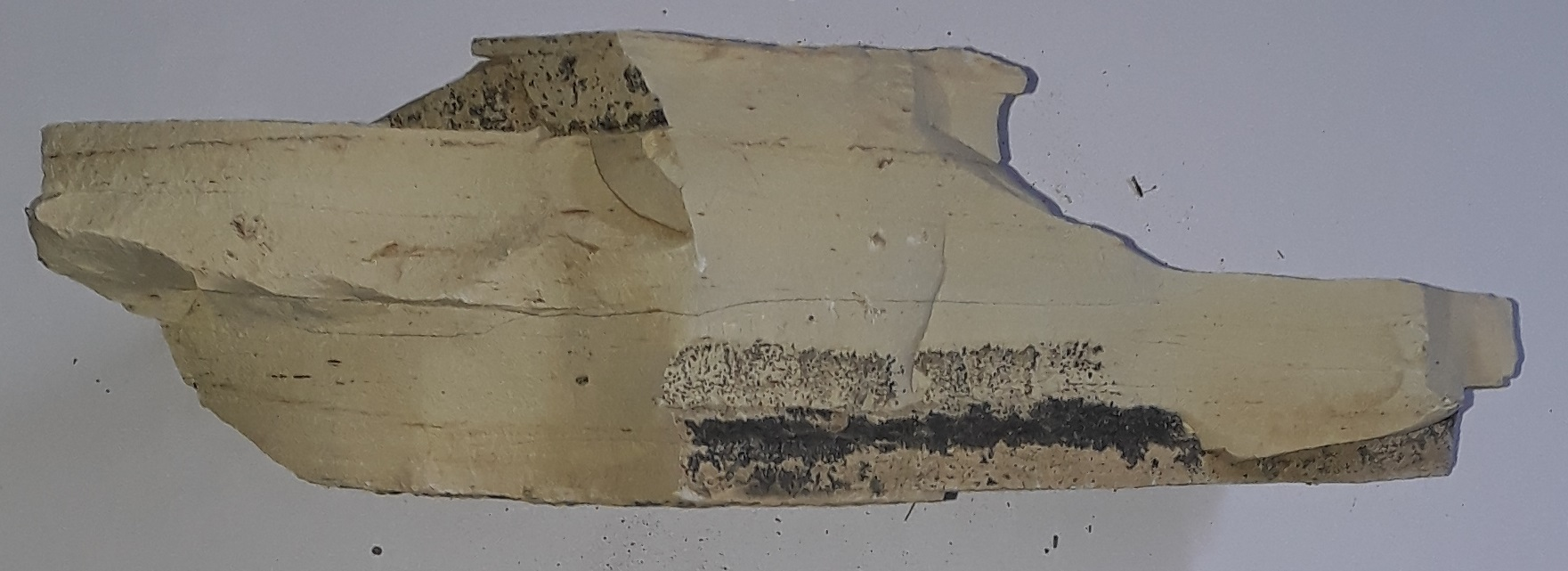
Rock sample of Interbedded lacustrine deposits, collected east of Khunale

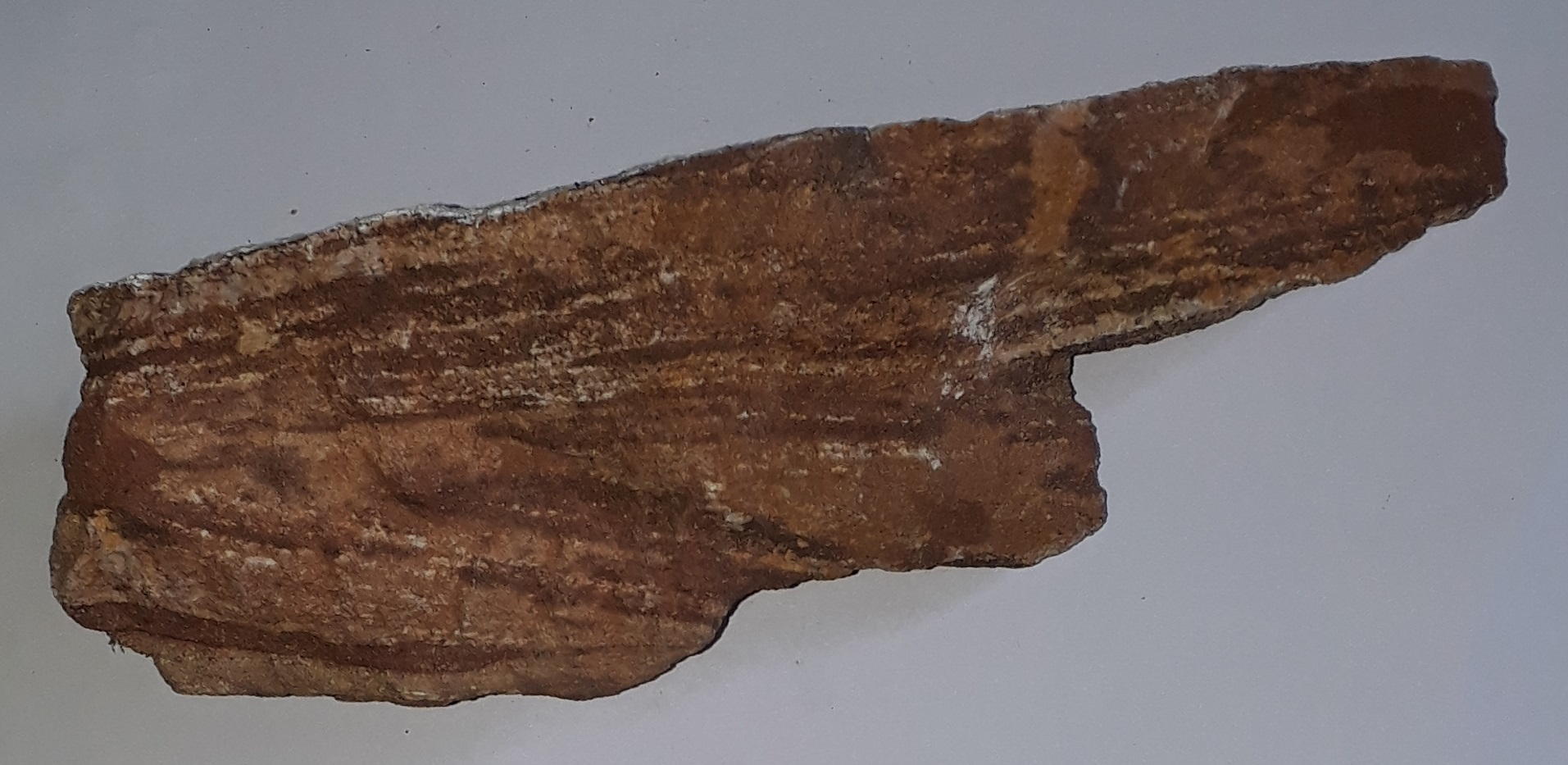
Rock sample of Amba Aradam sandstone, collected in Miheno

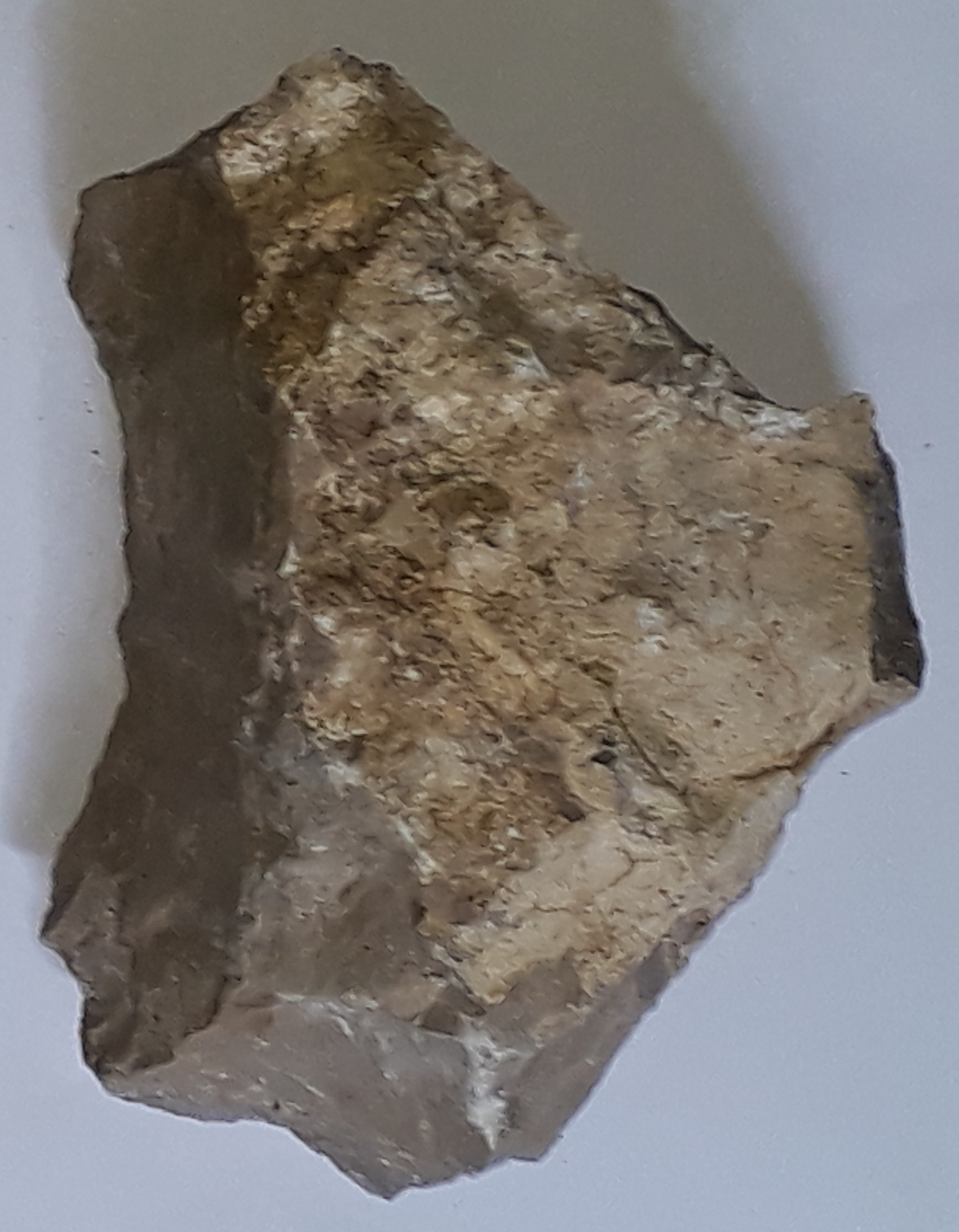
Rock sample from Antalo limestone, collected in Miheno

From the higher to the lower locations, the following geological formations are present:

- Phonolite plugs
- Upper basalt
- Interbedded lacustrine deposits
- Lower basalt
- Amba Aradam Formation
- Antalo Limestone
- Quaternary alluvium and freshwater tufa

=== Geomorphology and soils ===
The main geomorphic units, with corresponding soil types are:

==== Hagere Selam Highlands, along the upper basalt and sandstone ridge ====
- Associated soil types
  - shallow soils with high stone content (Skeletic Cambisol, Leptic Cambisol, Skeletic Regosol)
  - moderately deep dark stony clays with good natural fertility (Vertic Cambisol)

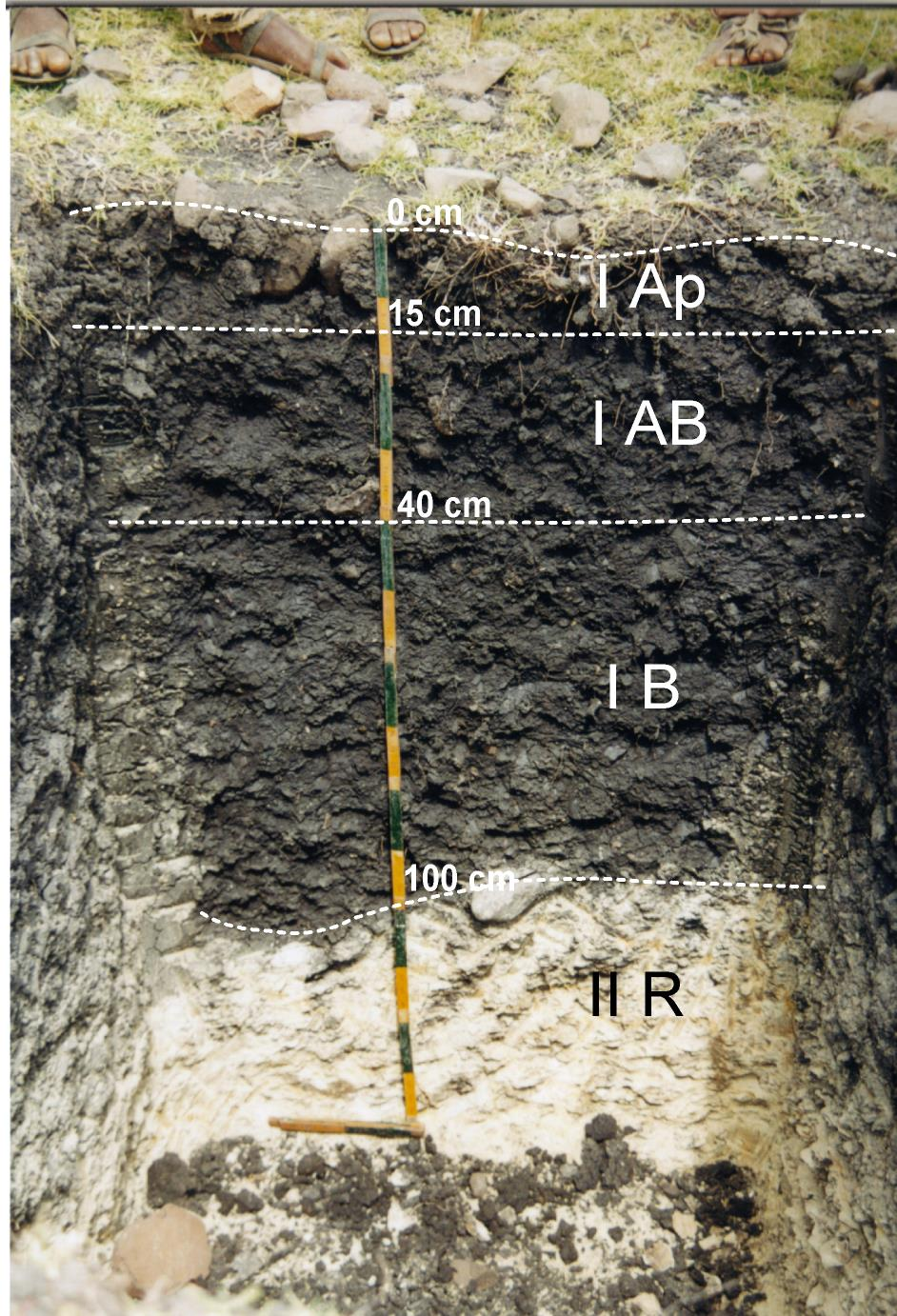
Mazi-Pellic Vertisol (Eutric) Thapto Haplic Leptosol at Mere'a Ziban

  - deep, dark cracking clays, temporarily waterlogged during the wet season (Pellic Vertisol)
- Inclusions
  - Rock outcrops and very shallow soils (Lithic Leptosol)
  - Rock outcrops and very shallow soils on limestone (Calcaric Leptosol)
  - Deep dark cracking clays with very good natural fertility, waterlogged during the wet season (Chromic Vertisol, Pellic Vertisol)
  - Shallow stony dark loams on calcaric material (Calcaric Regosol, Calcaric Cambisol)
  - Brown loamy soils on basalt with good natural fertility (Luvisol)

==== Gently rolling Antalo Limestone plateau (in the lower parts), holding cliffs and valley bottoms on limestone ====
- Associated soil types
  - shallow stony soils with a dark surface horizon overlying calcaric material (Calcaric Leptosol)
  - moderately deep dark stony clays with good natural fertility (Vertic Cambisol)
  - deep, dark cracking clays on calcaric material (Calcaric Vertisol, Calcic Vertisol)
- Inclusions
  - Rock outcrops and very shallow soils (Lithic Leptosol)
  - Shallow very stony loamy soil on limestone (Skeletic Calcaric Cambisol)
  - Deep dark cracking clays with very good natural fertility, waterlogged during the wet season (Chromic Vertisol, Pellic Vertisol)
  - Brown to dark sands and silt loams on alluvium (Vertic Fluvisol, Eutric Fluvisol, Haplic Fluvisol)

=== Climate and hydrology ===
==== Climate and meteorology ====
The rainfall pattern shows a very high seasonality with 70 to 80% of the annual rain falling in July and August. Mean temperature in Addi Werho is 18.8 °C, oscillating between average daily minimum of 10.5 °C and maximum of 26.7 °C. The contrasts between day and night air temperatures are much larger than seasonal contrasts.

==== Rivers ====
The Tsaliet River (a tributary to Weri'i River) is the most important rivers in the surroundings of the tabia. They flow towards Tekezze River and further on to the Nile. These rivers have incised deep gorges which characterise the landscape. The drainage network of the tabia is organised as follows:

- Weri'i River basin
  - May Leiba, in tabia Ayninbirkekin, which becomes Tinsehe R. in Selam and Mahbere Sillasie, and Tsaliet River, downstream from the Dabba Selama monastery
    - May Meqa River, in tabia Selam
    - Harehuwa River, in tabia Mahbere Sillasie

Whereas they are (nearly) dry during most of the year, during the main rainy season, these rivers carry high runoff discharges, sometimes in the form of flash floods. Especially at the begin of the rainy season they are brown-coloured, evidencing high soil erosion rates.

==== Springs ====
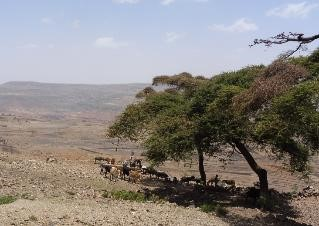
May Gudgwad spring in Khunale

As there are no permanent rivers, the presence of springs is of utmost importance for the local people. The main springs in the tabia are:

- May Gudgwad in Khunale
- May Miheno in Miheno

==== Water harvesting ====
In this area with rains that last only for a couple of months per year, reservoirs of different sizes allow harvesting runoff from the rainy season for further use in the dry season. Overall they suffer from siltation. Yet, they strongly contribute to greening the landscape, either through irrigation or seepage water. Main reservoirs are:

- Traditional surface water harvesting ponds, particularly in places without permanent springs, called rahaya
- Horoyo, household ponds, recently constructed through campaigns

=== Settlements ===
The tabia centre Addi Worho holds a few administrative offices, a health post, a primary school, and some small shops. There are a few more primary schools across the tabia. The main other populated places are:

- Khunale
- Addi Amyuq (on the boundary to Mahbere Sillasie)
- Miheno
- Tinsehe

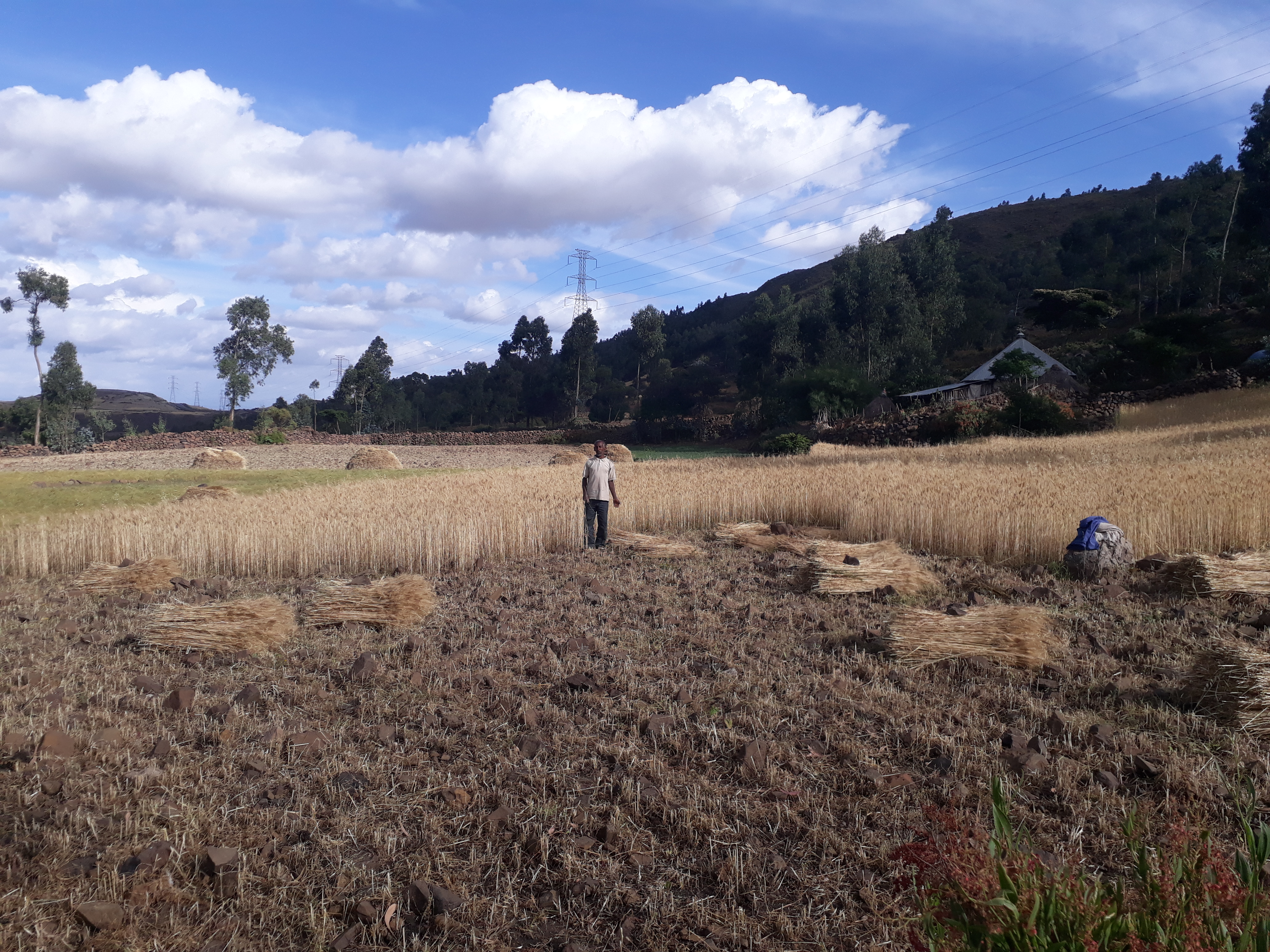
Crop harvesting in Khunale

=== Vegetation and exclosures ===
The tabia holds several exclosures, areas that are set aside for regreening, such as Khunale exclosure. Wood harvesting and livestock range are not allowed there. Besides effects on biodiversity, water infiltration, protection from flooding, sediment deposition, carbon sequestration, people commonly have economic benefits from these exclosures through grass harvesting, beekeeping and other non-timber forest products. The local inhabitants also consider it as "land set aside for future generations".

== Agriculture and livelihood ==
=== Agriculture ===
The population lives essentially from crop farming, supplemented with off-season work in nearby towns. The land is dominated by farmlands which are clearly demarcated and are cropped every year. Hence the agricultural system is a permanent upland farming system. The farmers have adapted their cropping systems to the spatio-temporal variability in rainfall.

=== Schools ===
Almost all children of the tabia are schooled, though in some schools there is lack of classrooms, directly related to the large intake in primary schools over the last decades. Schools in the tabia include Khunale school.

== History and culture ==
=== History ===
The history of the tabia is strongly confounded with the history of Tembien.

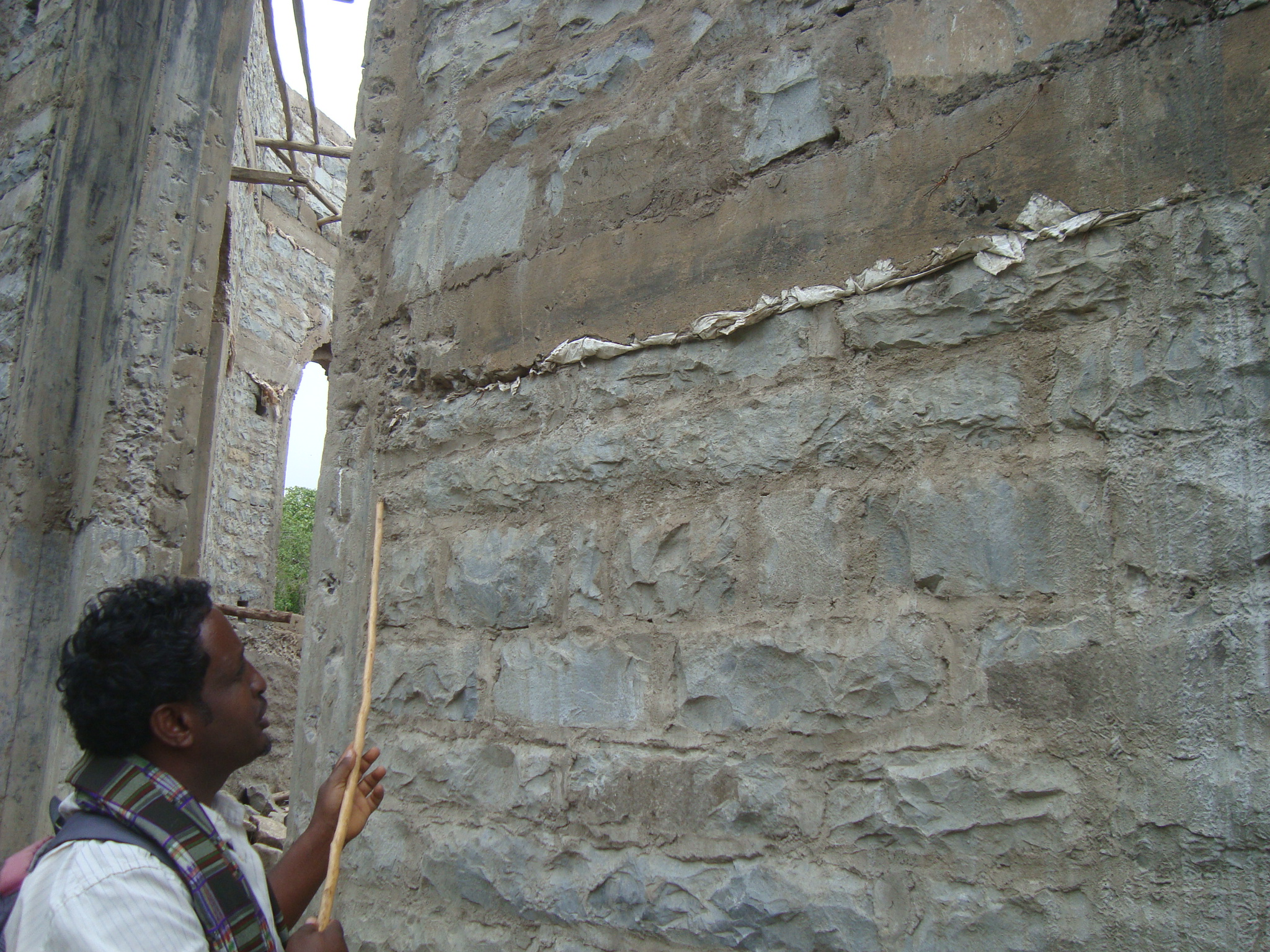
Phonolite is used as dimension stone for church building in Khunale

=== Religion and churches ===
Most inhabitants are Orthodox Christians. The following churches are located in the tabia:

- Arba'ite Insesa
- Abune Kiros
- Kidane Mihret, at the foot of, and partly under Tinsehe's waterfall, in a forested cove

=== Inda Siwa, the local beer houses ===
In the main villages, there are traditional beer houses (Inda Siwa), often in unique settings, where people socialise. Well known in the tabia are

- Kindhafti Abadi at Tinsehe
- Genet Gebrehiwet at Tinsehe

== Roads and communication ==
The main road Mekelle – Hagere Selam – Abiy Addi runs at the southern edge of the tabia. There are regular bus services to these towns. Further, a rural access road links Tinsehe and Addi Werho to the main asphalt road.

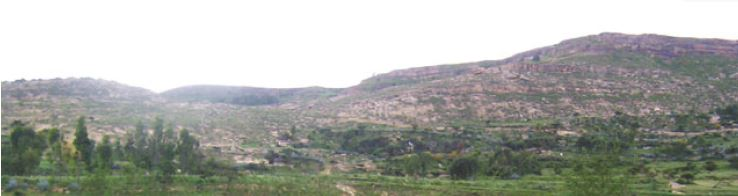
Limestone escarpment in Miheno

== Tourism ==
Its mountainous nature and proximity to Mekelle make the tabia fit for tourism. As compared to many other mountain areas in Ethiopia the villages are quite accessible, and during walks visitors may be invited for coffee, lunch or even for an overnight stay in a rural homestead.

=== Touristic attractions ===
- Tinsehe waterfall

=== Geotouristic sites ===
The high variability of geological formations and the rugged topography invite for geological and geographic tourism or "geotourism". Geosites in the tabia include:

- Ksad Addi Amyuq roadcut with exposed interbedded lacustrine deposits
- Views from Imba Zuw'ala
- Khunale exclosure
- Phonolite plug at Imba Khoboro
- Church built with phonolite stone in Khunale Arba'ite Insesa
- Meri'a Ziban hill in interbedded lacustrine deposits

=== Birdwatching ===
Birdwatching (for the species, see the main Dogu'a Tembien page) can be done particularly in the tropical forest at the foot of the Tinsehe waterfall.

=== Trekking routes ===
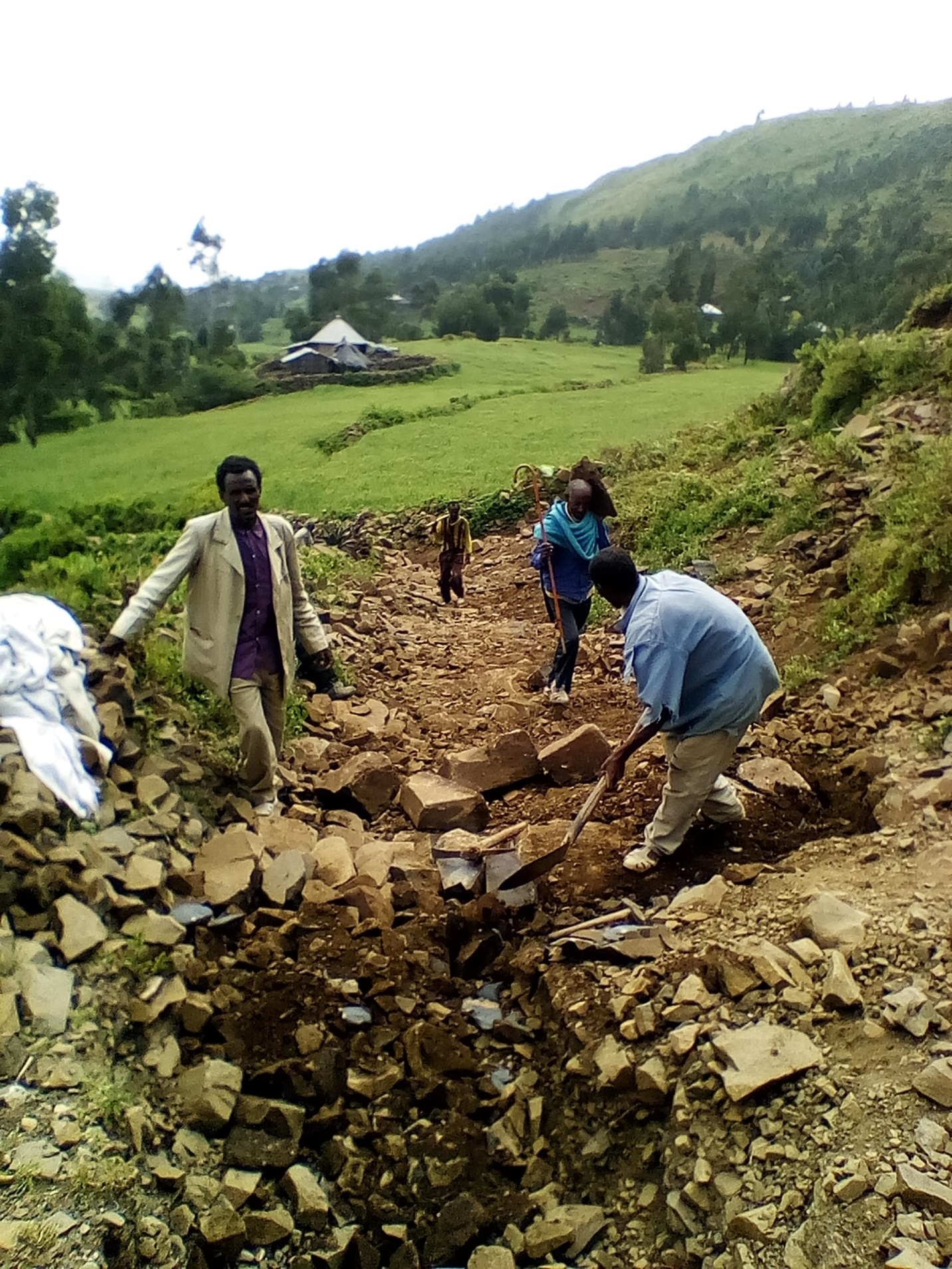
Maintenance of trekking route 2 in Khunale

Trekking routes have been established in this tabia. The tracks are not marked on the ground but can be followed using downloaded .GPX files.

- Trek 2, crosses the tabia from north (Khunale) to South (Tinsehe Waterfall)
- Trek 14, from west to east along the upper ridge at the southern side of the tabia
- Trek 23, from the main road in Miheno, downslope to Addi Idaga

== See also ==
- Dogu'a Tembien district.
