= Food security in Tanzania =

The state of food security is a heavily scrutinized issue in the United Republic of Tanzania. Agriculture accounts for almost one-third of the nation's GDP (Gross Domestic Product). It is an aspect of Tanzania that although obstructed by many internal and external factors, is continually worked on by outside forces and the nation itself.

There are several contributors to food security, including economic growth, agricultural policy, environmental changes, climate change and governance. Furthermore, food security – or lack of it – can have lasting repercussions on a population.

On a global scale, Tanzania is lagging behind in terms of food security. According to the Proteus Global Food Security Index – data collected by the World Food Programme – Tanzania has an index of 0.564 on an index scale of 0.08 to 0.775, where the higher end of the spectrum signals food insecurity, Tanzania measures 0.564 and ranks 162nd out of 185 countries included. Another report by the World Food Programme found that 7 out of 20 monitored Tanzanian markets reached crisis level in Q4-2019 according to ALPS (Alert for Price Spikes) calculation. To further contextualize the parameters used to assess these Tanzanian markets and their deficiencies, the ALPS Indicator "monitors the extent to which local markets experience unusually high food prices by comparing the level of monthly food prices against their estimated seasonal trend and categorizing them as normal, stress, alert or crisis."

== Challenges ==
Tanzania is burdened with a long list of structural issues stunting its capabilities in the food security arena. A lack of financial and operational means – limited access to capital, underdeveloped business skills, low levels of capacity – coupled with a weak infrastructure lead to an absence of incentives when it comes to further developing their agriculture sector.

=== Natural Obstacles ===
Some of the factors affecting Tanzania's food security aren't easily controllable variables.

As recently as February 2020, locusts are devastating Tanzanian and other East-African crops, threatening the region's ability to maintain agricultural production levels and consequently, food security . A Time article reporting on the issue emphasizes how big of a problem this product of nature can be:

The swarms are extremely large, in North-Eastern Kenya, one swarm was measured to be 37 miles long and 25 miles wide. The UN says that desert locusts are the most dangerous migratory pests because of their capacity to decimate crops, threatening food security and livelihoods. Swarms, which can contain 40-80 million locust adults, can consume crops in one day that would provide food for 35,000 people.

The inevitable adverse affects these insects will have on such a large component of the nation's economic stability make finding a solution all the more necessary.

Model of current Tanzania climate

=== Climate Change ===
As a direct result of being so heavily reliant on rain-fed agriculture as a steady source of GDP inflow and food security, a low-income nation such as Tanzania is extremely susceptible to the agricultural effects of climate change.

According to a 2012 World Bank Group research paper, in a DRY scenario, climate-change affected Tanzania's agricultural production is more than 10% lower compared to a control of no-climate-change Tanzania due to increases in temperature and shift in rainfall patterns by the mid-century (2041–2050). Out of the four scenarios outlined in the study (wet, dry, cool, and hot) three of them affected food security unfavorably, pointing to the likelihood of climate change's negative impact.

The risks of drought and the unpredictable nature of climate change and its affects on the weather/environment threaten the future growth of Tanzania and its large base of subsistence farmers.

== Advancements ==
While there may be many obstacles between Tanzania and full food security, the nation continues to find ways to move forward. According to USAID, more than 190,000 hectares of Tanzania's land have made moves toward improved practice in terms of agriculture and technology. Furthermore, overall productivity of rice per acre has actually doubled because of the collaboration of Tanzania and USAID in their concerted effort to promote sustainable agriculture and a greater focus on nutrition – otherwise known as the Sustainable Development Goal. Another collaborative campaign for food security Tanzania is participating in is the four-year Enabling Growth through Investment and Enterprise Program (ENGINE). Implemented by the International Executive Service Corps (IESC), the program helps expedite the assessment and subsequent improvement of regulatory, informational, and financial channels that assist business growth and investment of some of Tanzania's agricultural regions (Mbeya, Morogoro, and Iringa, and Zanzibar).

== Affects on Population ==
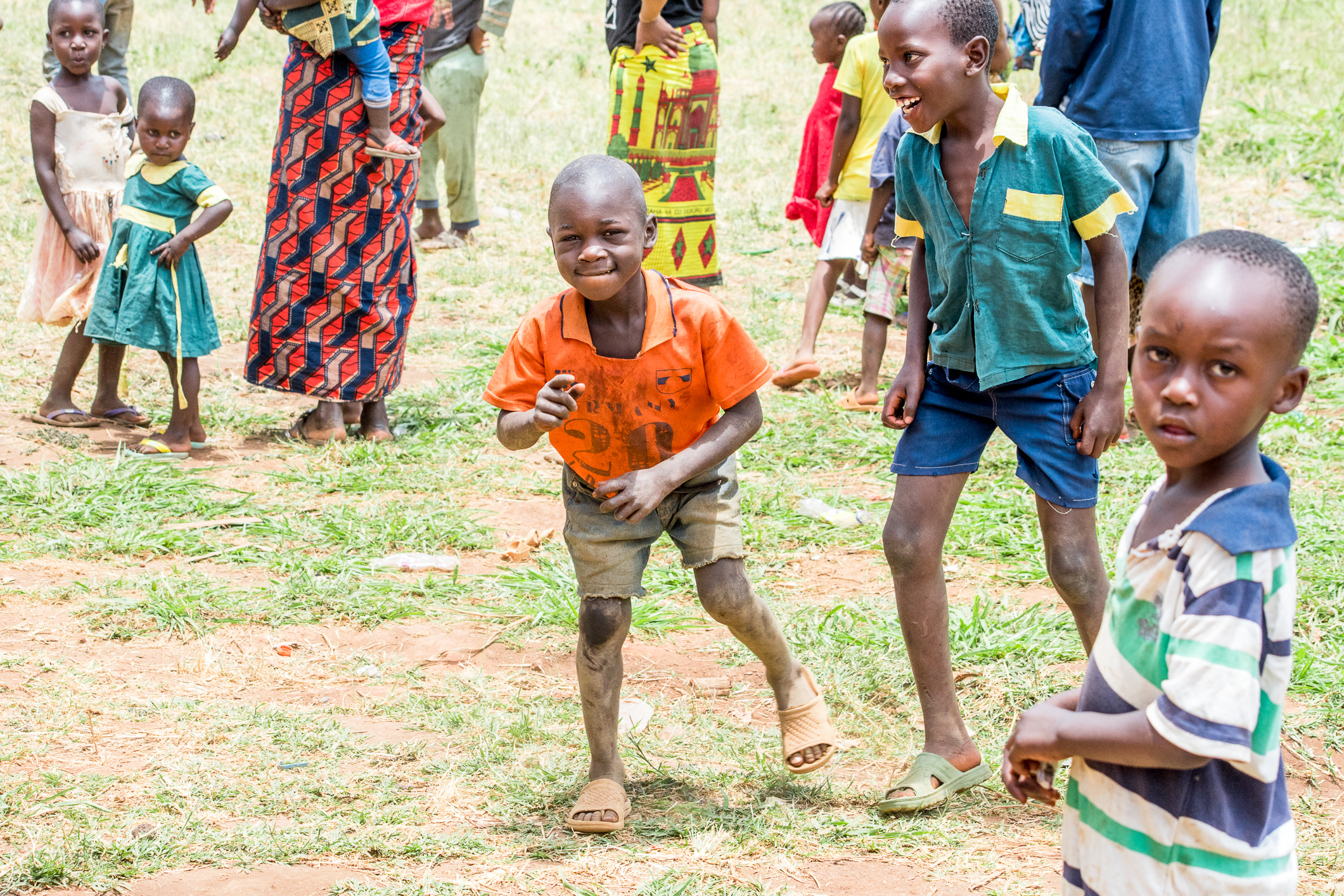
Tanzania's youth are especially susceptible to malnourishment

=== Physical Impacts ===
The food insecurity prevalent across the nation has rippling effects on the population. Tanzania has had an ongoing issue of undernourished citizens. According to an Brookings Tanzania case study, a sizable segment of rural Tanzania suffer malnourishment – approximately 39.3 percent. The World Bank surmises the same, where 34% of Tanzanian report not being able to achieve energy requirements. A large part of this can be attributed between the discrepancy between the food production on the nation level and the food received on the individual level. Accessibility to food isn't the same for every Tanzanian, leading to the fact that 34 percent of the population can't meet daily caloric requirements. Another main contributor to these inadequacies is a lack of nutritional diversity in food produced and eaten. According to an Acta Tropica journal study, both rural and urban Tanzanians heavily rely on carbohydrates – maize, rice, cassava, ugali – as their main source of food. Carbohydrates, while a good source of energy, fail to cover all the nutritional bases necessary for leading a healthy lifestyle. This very fact is evident in 2016 data collected by the ERH (Ending Rural Hunger): "result, high rates of malnutrition are observed, especially among children under five, leading the country to have above-average malnutrition rates compared to other countries in the region... 58 percent and 45 percent of children and women respectively are anemic."

=== Mental Impacts ===
In terms of its impact on the typical citizen, lack of food security doesn't just have adverse physical (i.e. malnutrition) effects; food insecurity issues can also manifest themselves within the mind.

A preliminary study conducted in 2006 observed four ethnic groups across two rural communities Tanzania; using a USDA food security module in tandem with the Hopkins Symptom Checklist to properly measure food security as well as anxiety and depression, the study found a strong positive correlation between food security levels and anxiety/depression. In general, food insecurity can be linked to a number nutritional inadequacies in the population of nation, and some of these inadequacies are associated with symptoms of depression and immune system function. These connections aren't as frequently studied as other implications of food insecurity; Hadley and Patil's 2006 study suggest this lack of proper observation stems from a "lack of adequate instruments to quantify mental health outcomes in rural non-Western settings."
