= Desert Locust Control Organization for Eastern Africa =

Organization

The Desert Locust Control Organization for Eastern Africa (DLCO-EA) is a regional organization for integrated pest and vector management to ensure food security in Eastern Africa (Uganda, Kenya, Tanzania, Ethiopia, Sudan, South Sudan, Eritrea, Somalia, and Djibouti), established in 1962.

== Organization ==
Member countries are Djibouti, Eritrea, Ethiopia, Kenya, Somalia, South Sudan, Sudan, Tanzania and Uganda.

The DLCO-EA's headquarters are in Addis Ababa, Ethiopia, and the operations coordination base (air unit) is at the Wilson Airport in Nairobi, Kenya. Each member country has a Control Reserve Base (CRB) and a Base Manager (MG) that represents the Organization at Country level and coordinates country migratory pest control operations.

== History ==
The DLCO-EA was established by an International Convention signed in Addis Ababa in 1962, and is registered with the United Nations. This followed the desert locust plagues of the 1940s that left massive hunger and deaths across the region, and the recommendation, in October 1961 by the 3rd session of the Food and Agriculture Organization Eastern Africa Desert Locust Control Sub-committee, for its establishment. The desert locusts breed in the Sahel region of Africa and migrate to the rest of the world when food resources are exhausted within the breeding areas.

Following the successful management of the locusts, resulting into Uganda, Kenya, and Tanzania being free from attacks for many years, the DLCO-EA mandate was extended to include other migratory pests such as the African Armyworm moth (Spodoptera exempta), the grain-eating and destroying birds (Quelea quelea) and Tsetse flies (Glossina spp), vectors of nagana and sleeping sickness.
