= Zikuli River =

River in the Tembien highlands of Ethiopia

Zikuli
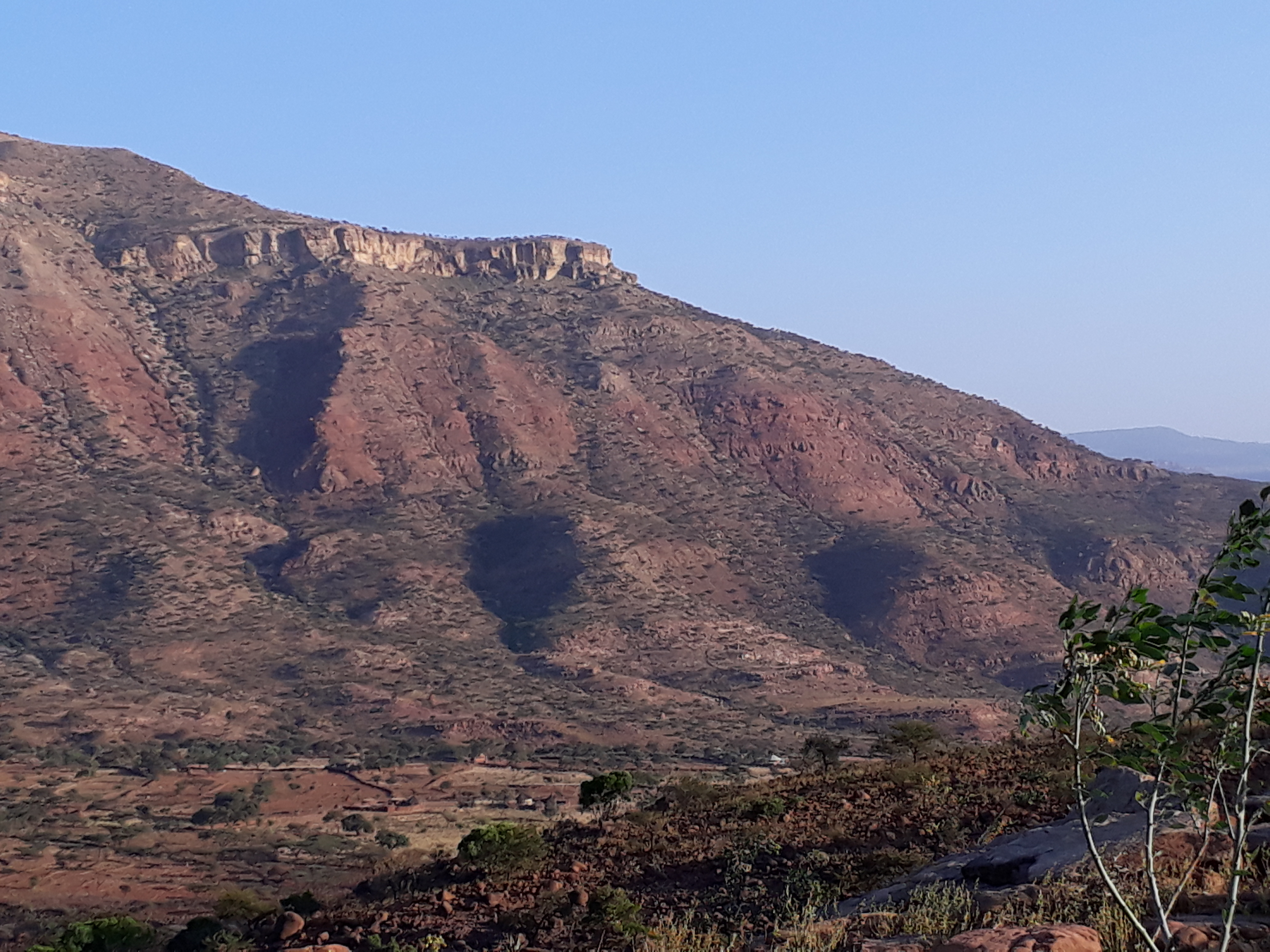
- The Zikuli valley

- Zikuli River in Dogu’a Tembien and Abergele
- Etymology: Named after the homonymous village

Location
- Country: Ethiopia
- Region: Tigray Region
- District (woreda): Dogu’a Tembien

Physical characteristics
- Source
  - location: Down from Addi Shinqur in Simret municipality
  - elevation: 1,837 m (6,027 ft)
- Mouth: Giba River
  - location: Kemishana in Simret municipality
  - coordinates: 13.479°N 39.090°E
  - elevation: 1,395 m (4,577 ft)
- Length: 12 km (7.5 mi)
- Width
  - average: 15 m (49 ft)

Basin features
- Progression: Giba→ Tekezé→ Atbarah→ Nile→ Mediterranean Sea
- River system: Seasonal river
- Topography: Mountains and deep gorges

The Zikuli, also called Gereb Awhi or Mennewe River, is a river of the Nile basin. Rising in the mountains of Dogu’a Tembien in northern Ethiopia, it flows southward to empty finally in the Giba and Tekezé River.

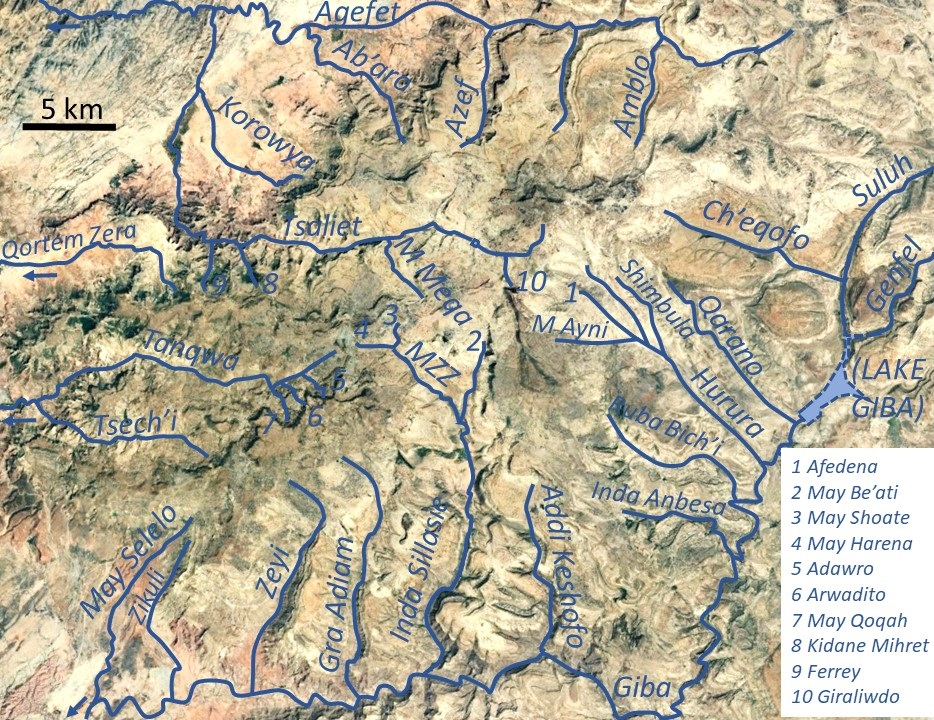
The river in the radial drainage network of Dogu’a Tembien

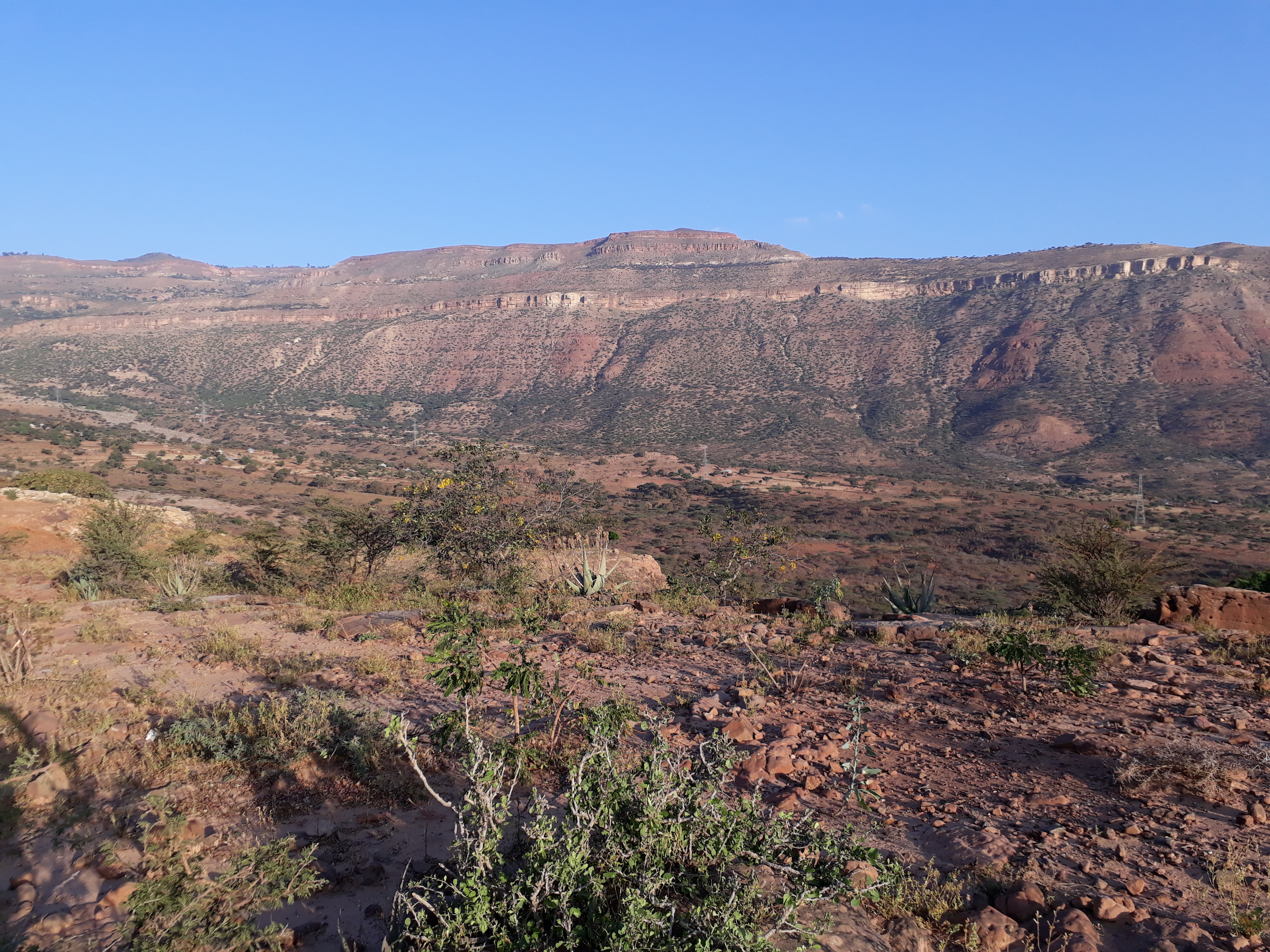
Upper Zikuli catchment

== Characteristics ==
The Zikuli is a confined ephemeral river, locally meandering in its narrow alluvial plain, with an average slope gradient of 37 metres per kilometre. With its tributaries, the river has cut a gorge.

== Flash floods and flood buffering ==
Runoff mostly happens in the form of high runoff discharge events that occur in a very short period (called flash floods). These are related to the steep topography, often little vegetation cover and intense convective rainfall. The peaks of such flash floods have often a 50 to 100 times larger discharge than the preceding baseflow. The magnitude of floods in this river has however been decreased due to interventions in the catchment. On steep slopes, exclosures have been established; the dense vegetation largely contributes to enhanced infiltration, less flooding and better baseflow. Physical conservation structures such as stone bunds and check dams also intercept runoff.

== Transhumance towards the lower valley ==
Transhumance takes place in the summer rainy season, when the lands near the villages are occupied by crops. Young shepherds will take the village cattle down to the gorge and overnight in small caves. The gorges are particularly attractive as a transhumance destination zone, because there is water and good growth of semi-natural vegetation.

== Boulders and pebbles in the river bed ==
Boulders and pebbles encountered in the river bed can originate from any location higher up in the catchment. In the uppermost stretches of the river, only rock fragments of the upper lithological units will be present in the river bed, whereas more downstream one may find a more comprehensive mix of all lithologies crossed by the river. From upstream to downstream, the following lithological units occur in the catchment.

- Upper basalt
- Interbedded lacustrine deposits
- Lower basalt
- Amba Aradam Formation
- Antalo Limestone
- Quaternary freshwater tufa
- Adigrat Sandstone

== Natural boundary ==
Almost over the full length of its course, the Zikuli runs parallel, just west of the border between Abergele and Dogu’a Tembien districts.

== Trekking along the river ==
Trekking routes have been established across and along this river. The tracks are not marked on the ground but can be followed using downloaded .GPX files.

- Trek 8 follows Zikuli River over a long distance. In the rainy season, flash floods may occur and it is advised not to walk in the river bed. At times it may be impossible to cross the river in the rainy season.

== See also ==
- List of Ethiopian rivers
