= May Selelo =

River in the Tembien highlands of Ethiopia

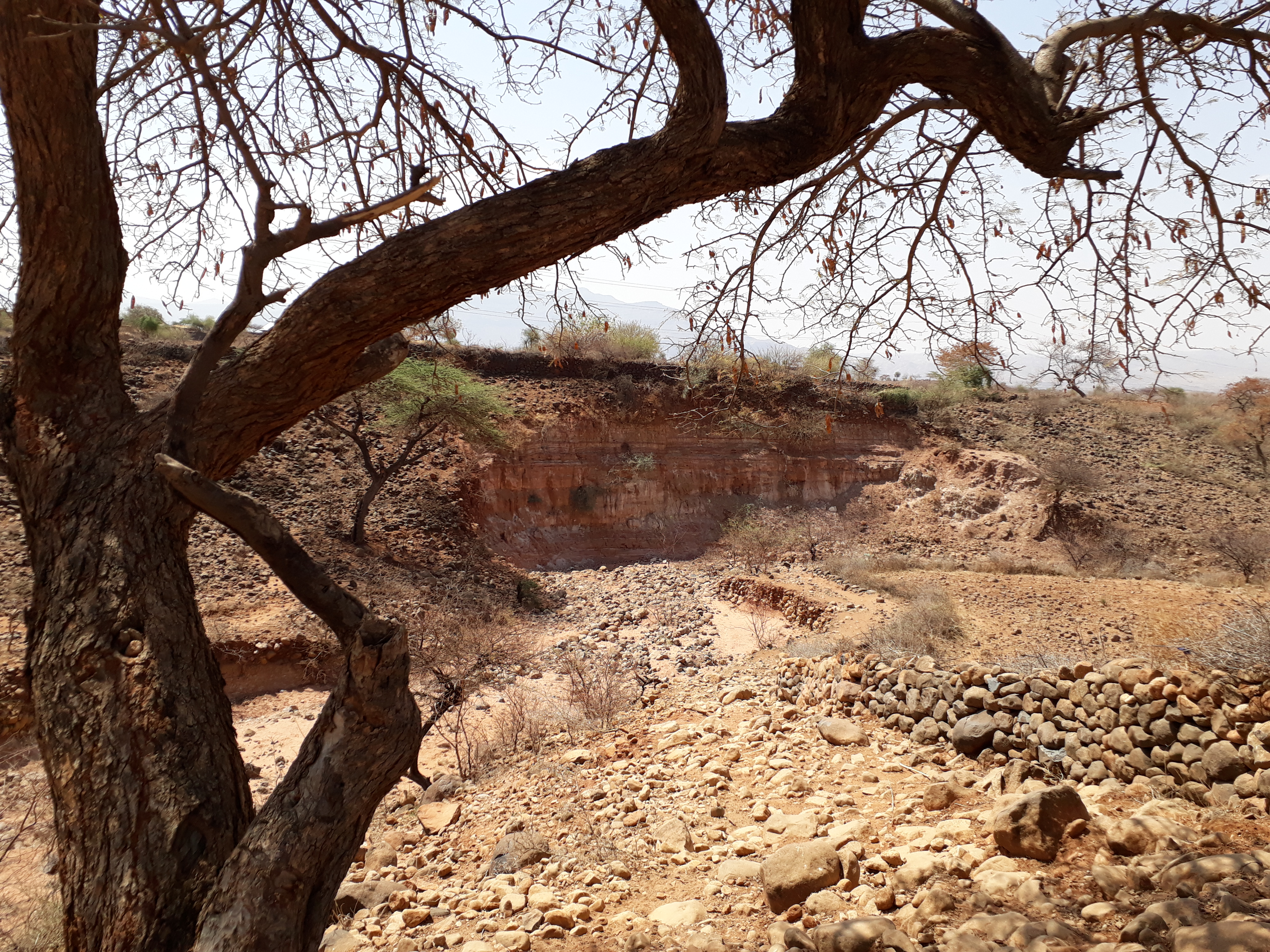
- The May Selelo River at Dasarawat

- May Selelo River in Dogu’a Tembien and Abergele

Location
- Country: Ethiopia
- Region: Tigray Region
- District (woreda): Dogu’a Tembien

Physical characteristics
- Source: Gunfan
  - location: Mennewe in Simret municipality
  - elevation: 2,200 m (7,200 ft)
- Mouth: Giba River
  - location: Just upstream from Giba bridge in Abergele district
  - coordinates: 13.463°N 39.028°E
  - elevation: 1,370 m (4,490 ft)
- Length: 19.5 km (12.1 mi)
- Width
  - average: 18 m (59 ft)

Basin features
- Progression: Giba→ Tekezé→ Atbarah→ Nile→ Mediterranean Sea
- River system: Seasonal/permanent river
- Landmarks: Mennawe monastery and birthplace of Ras Alula
- Topography: Mountains and deep gorges

The May Selelo is a river of the Nile basin. Rising in the mountains of Dogu’a Tembien in northern Ethiopia, it flows southward to empty in the Giba and Tekezé River.

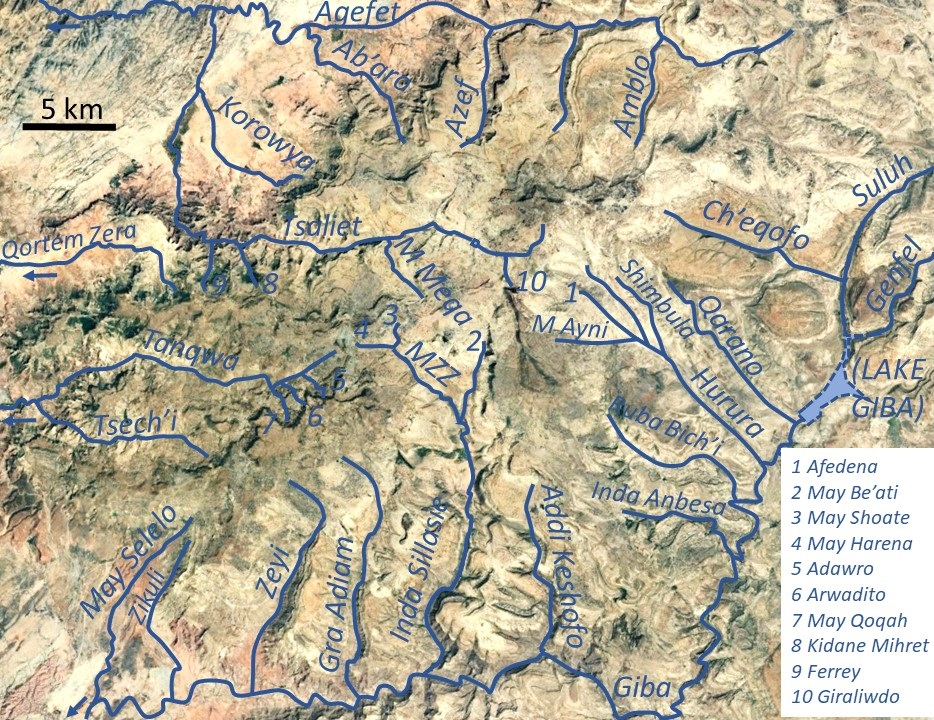
The river in the radial drainage network of Dogu’a Tembien

== Characteristics ==
It is a confined ephemeral river, locally meandering in its narrow alluvial plain, with an average slope gradient of 43 metres per kilometre. With its tributaries, the river has cut a deep gorge.

== Flash floods and flood buffering ==
Runoff mostly happens in the form of high runoff discharge events that occur in a very short period (called flash floods). These are related to the steep topography, often little vegetation cover and intense convective rainfall. The peaks of such flash floods have often a 50 to 100 times larger discharge than the preceding baseflow.

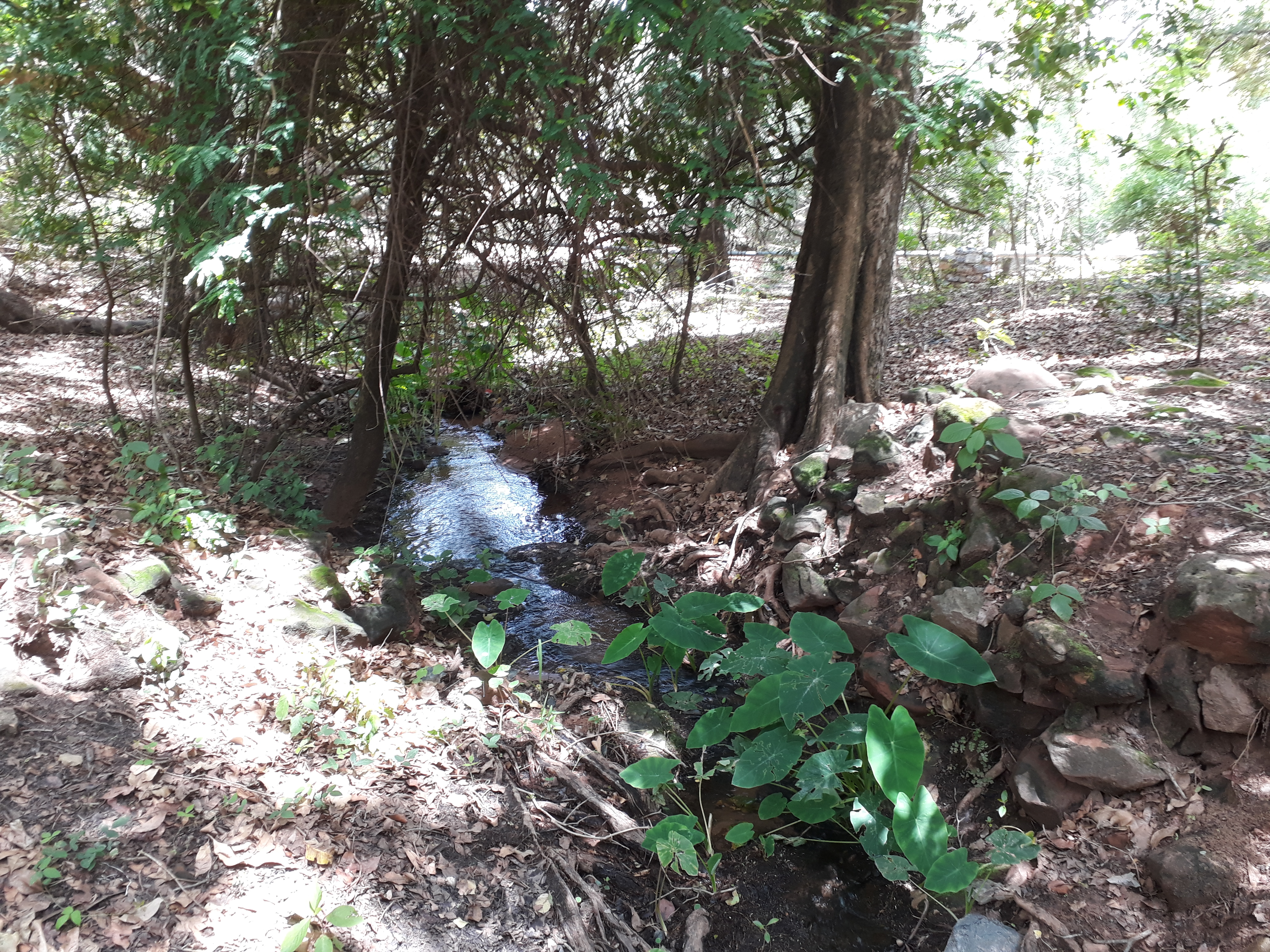
Affluent to May Selelo at Adenna

The magnitude of floods in this river has been decreased due to interventions in the catchment. On some steep slopes, exclosures have been established; the dense vegetation largely contributes to enhanced infiltration, less flooding and better baseflow. Physical conservation structures such as stone bunds and check dams also intercept runoff.

== Transhumance towards the gorge ==
Transhumance takes place in the summer rainy season, when the lands near the villages are occupied by crops. Young shepherds will take the village cattle down to the gorge and overnight in small caves. The gorges are particularly attractive as a transhumance destination zone, because there is water and good growth of semi-natural vegetation.

== Boulders and pebbles in the river bed ==
Boulders and pebbles encountered in the river bed can originate from any location higher up in the catchment. In the uppermost stretches of the river, only rock fragments of the upper lithological units will be present in the river bed, whereas more downstream one may find a more comprehensive mix of all lithologies crossed by the river. From upstream to downstream, the following lithological units occur in the catchment.

- Upper basalt
- Interbedded lacustrine deposits
- Lower basalt
- Amba Aradam Formation
- Antalo Limestone
- Quaternary freshwater tufa
- Adigrat Sandstone

== Two districts ==
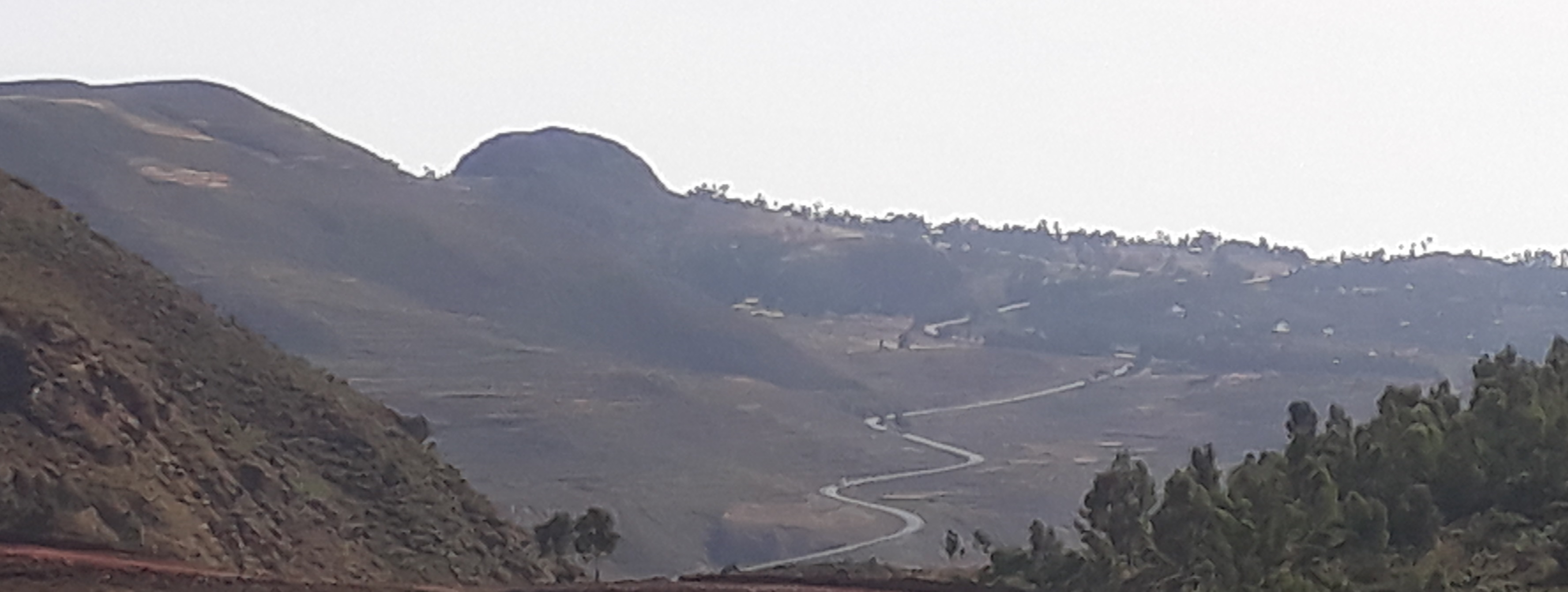
May Selelo headwaters

Along its course, this river passes through two woredas: Dogu’a Tembien for the headwaters, and Abergele for the larger part of its course.

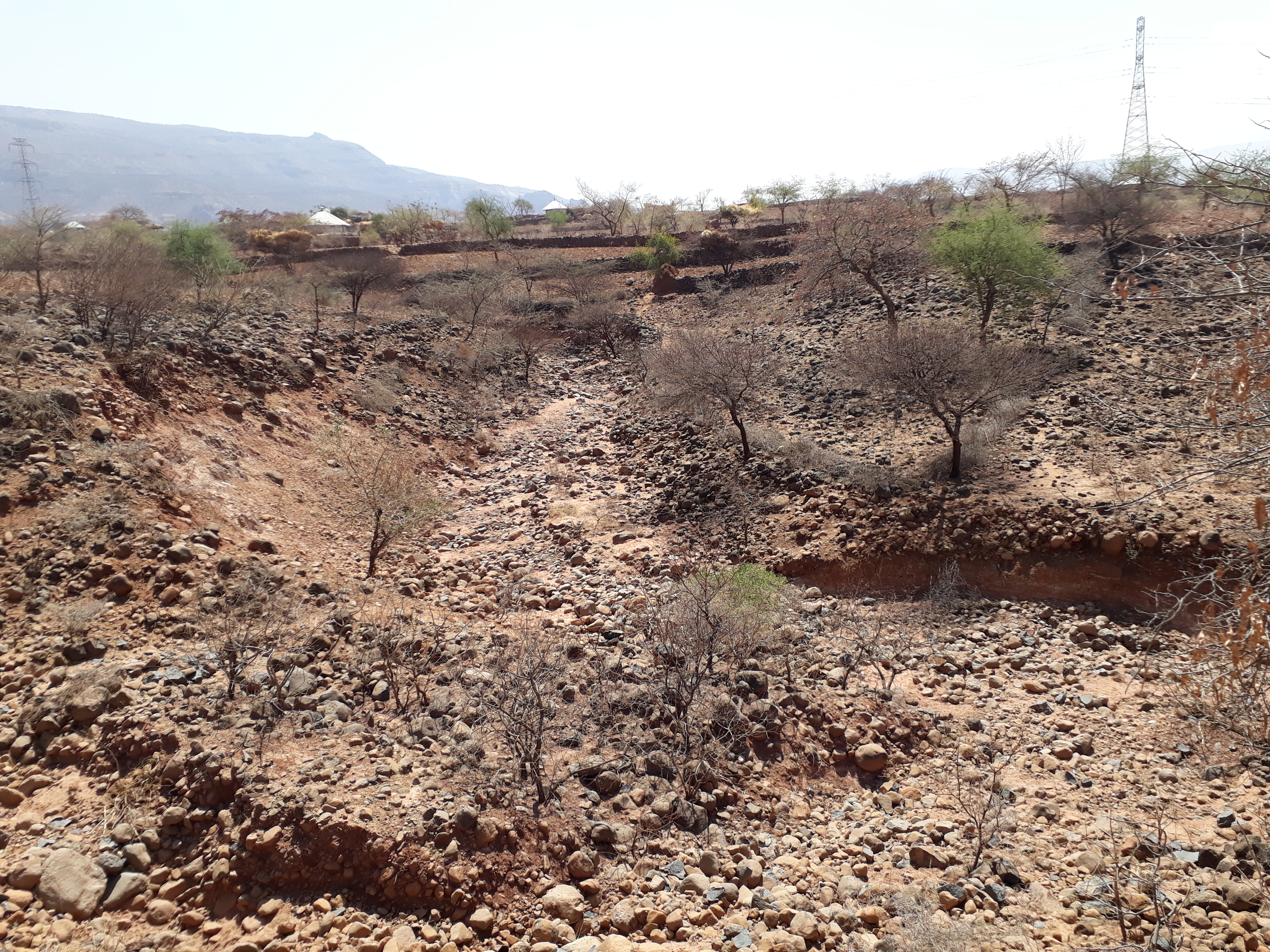
Trek S2 crosses May Selelo in Dasarawat

== Trekking along the river ==
Trekking routes have been established across and along this river. The tracks are not marked on the ground but can be followed using downloaded .GPX files.

- Trek 8, across the river in Kalazban village
- Trek S2, across the river in Dasarawat village

In the rainy season, flash floods may occur and it is advised not to follow the river bed. At times it may be impossible to cross the river in the rainy season.

== See also ==
- List of Ethiopian rivers
