= Giba River =

River in the Tigray highlands of Ethiopia

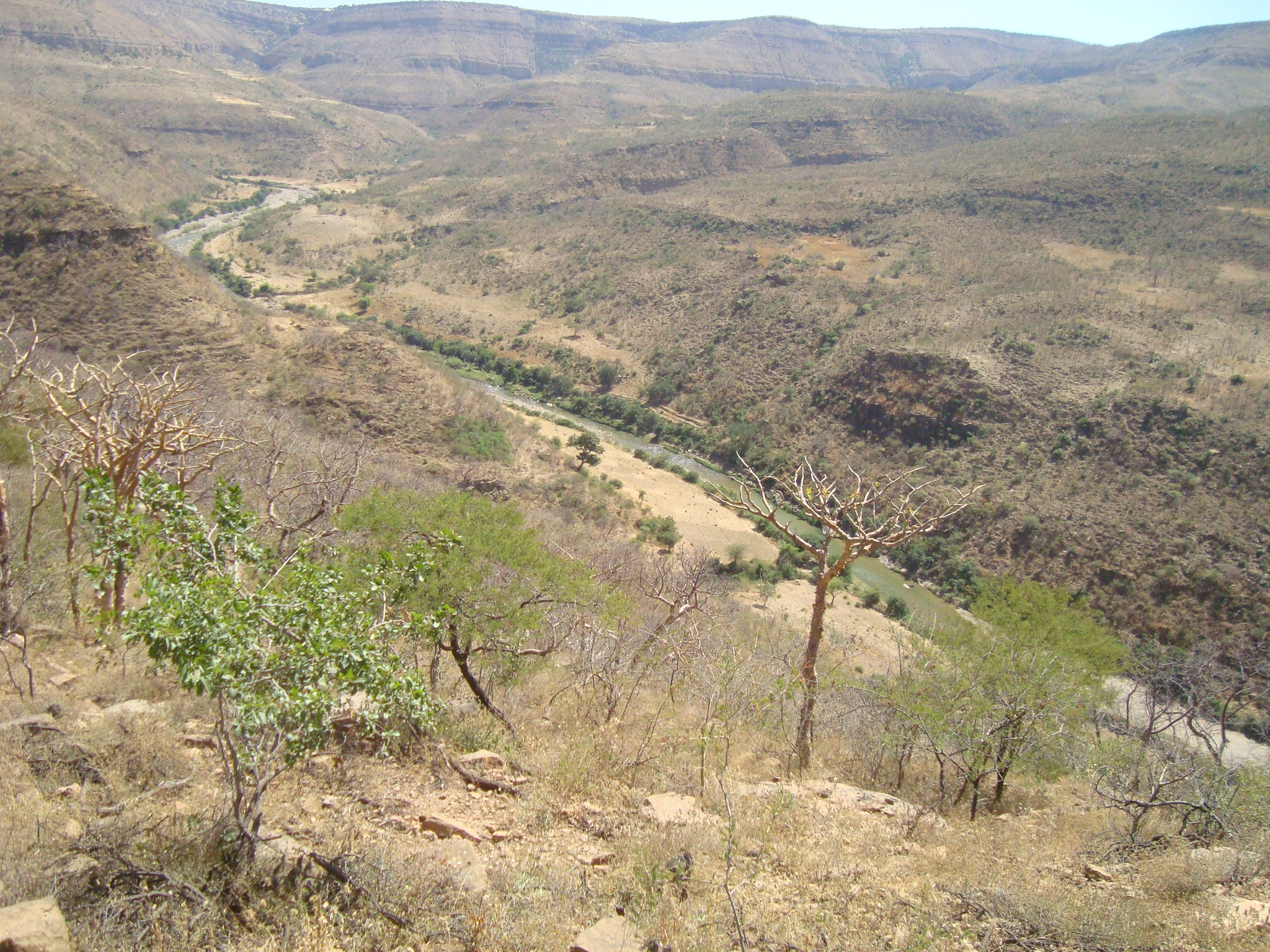
- The Giba River at Addi Lihtsi

- Giba River in Tigray Region

Location
- Country: Ethiopia
- Region: Tigray Region
- Districts (woreda): Dogu’a Tembien; Inderta; Saharti Samre; Abergele

Physical characteristics
- Source: Genfel River
  - location: Shugu'a Shugu'i in Emni Ankelalu
  - elevation: 1,770 m (5,810 ft)
- 2nd source: Sulluh River
- Mouth: Tekezé River
  - location: Down from Jo’amare in Kola Tembien
  - coordinates: 13.605°N 38.635°E
  - elevation: 970 m (3,180 ft)
- Length: 121 km (75 mi)
- Basin size: 5,200 km^{2} (2,000 mi^{2})
- Width
  - average: 40 m (130 ft)
- Discharge
  - location: Old bridge in Debre Nazret
  - maximum: 1,740 m^{3}/s (61,000 cu ft/s)
- Discharge
  - location: Upstream of the confluence with Tanqwa in Barashuwa
  - maximum: 551 m^{3}/s (19,500 cu ft/s)

Basin features
- Progression: Tekezé→ Atbarah→ Nile→ Mediterranean Sea
- River system: Permanent river
- Tributaries
  - left: Ilala, May Gabat
  - right: Inda Sillasie River, Tanqwa
- Waterbodies: Future Lake Giba, Gereb Segen and many small reservoirs
- Bridges: Qarano, Old bridge (Debre Nazret), Abergele
- Topography: Mountains and deep gorges

The Giba is a river of northern Ethiopia. It starts at the confluence of Genfel and Sulluh (which rises in the mountains of Mugulat) (3,298 metres above sea level) and flows westward to the Tekezé River. Future Lake Giba will occupy the plain where the Sulluh, Genfel and Agula'i Rivers meet, and hence be the future source of Giba River.

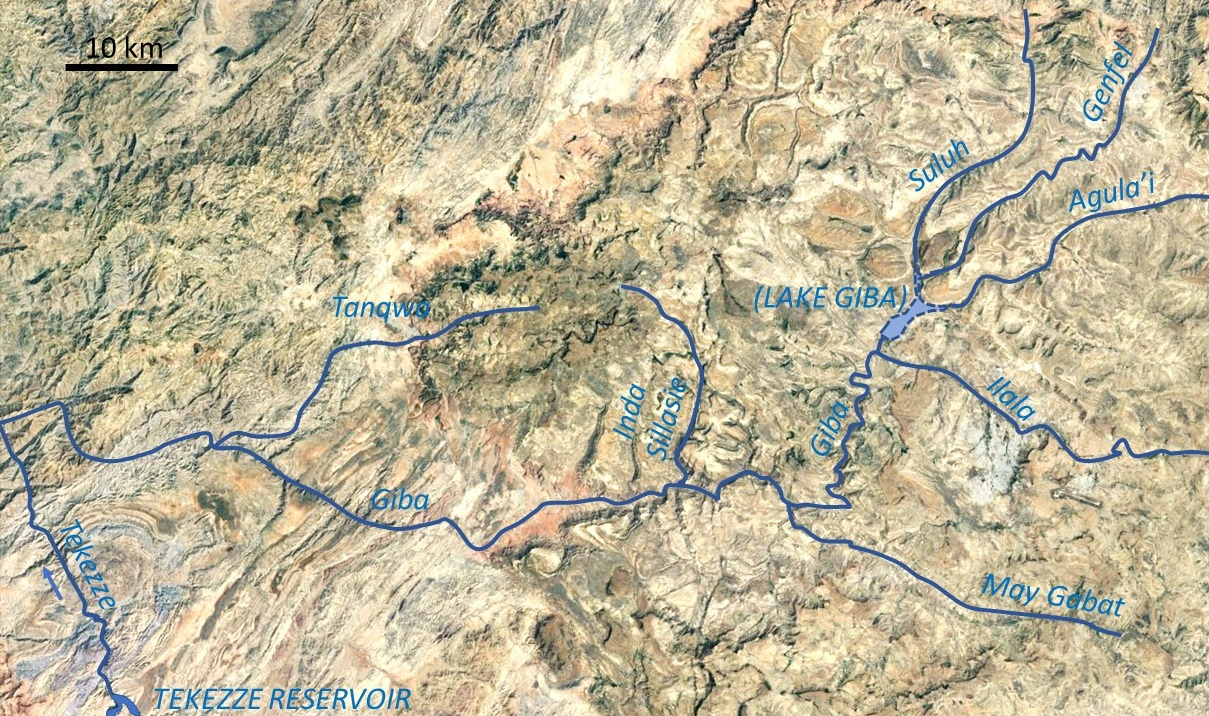
Giba drainage network

== Hydrography ==
It is a confined river, locally meandering in its narrow alluvial plain, with a slope gradient of 7 metres per kilometre. With its tributaries, the river has cut a deep gorge.

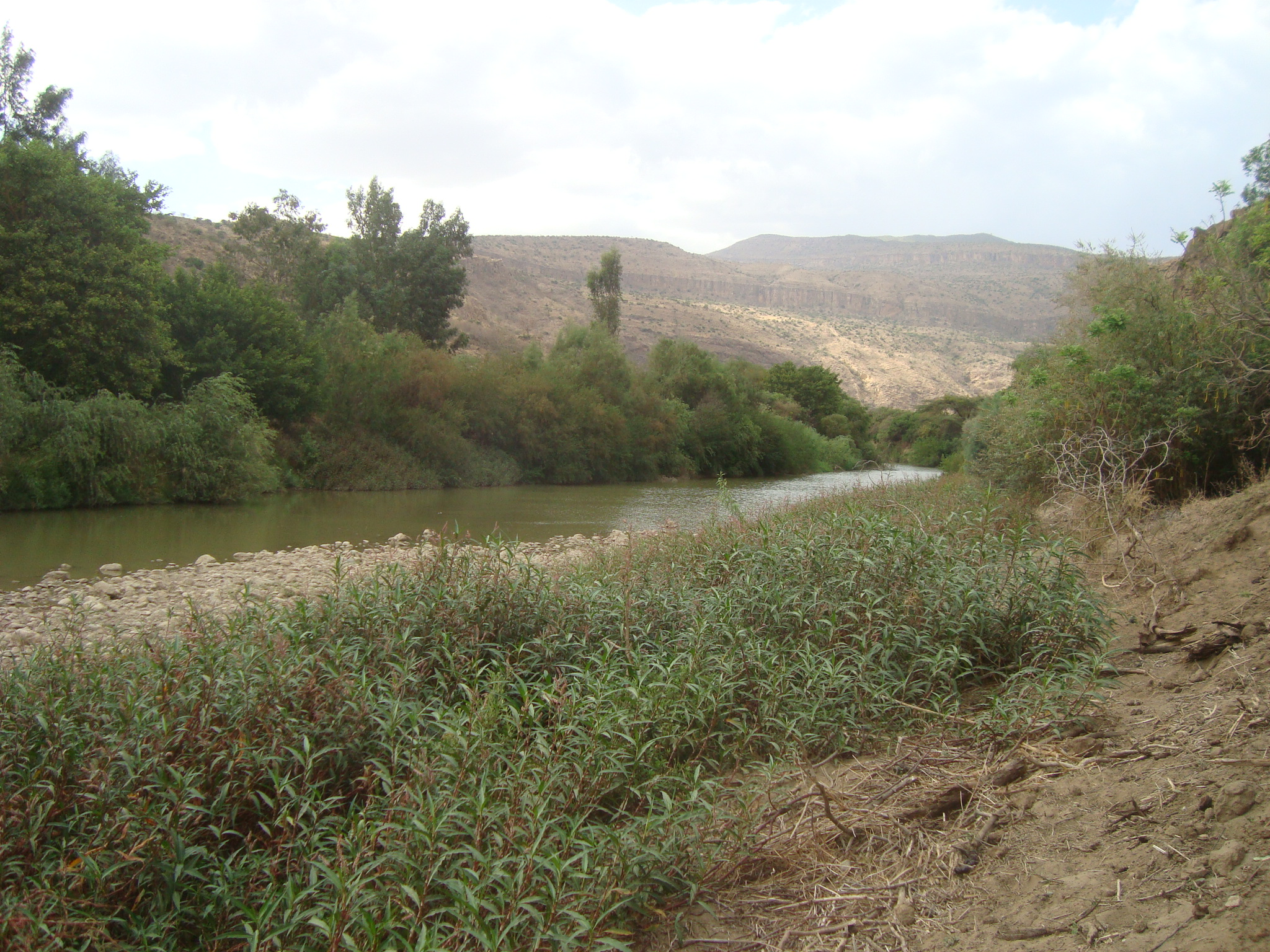
Pool in Giba

=== Tributaries ===
Main tributaries, from downstream to upstream, are

- Tanqwa
  - Tsech'i River
  - May Qoqah
  - Arwadito
  - Adawro River
- May Selelo
- Zikuli River
- Gra Adiam River, also called Bitchoqo River
- Zeyi River
- Inda Sillasie River
  - May Zegzeg
    - May Harena
    - May Sho'ate
  - May Be'ati River
- Addi Keshofo River
- May Gabat
- Inda Anbesa
- Ruba Bich'i River
- Hurura
  - Afedena River
    - May Ayni
  - Shimbula
- Ilala River
- Qarano River
- Agula'i River
- Genfel
- Sulluh
  - Ch'eqofo River

== Hydrology ==
=== Hydrological characteristics ===
The runoff footprint or annual total runoff volume is 558 million m³. Peak discharges up to 1740 m³ per second occur in the second part of the rainy season (month of August) when there are strong rains and the soils are saturated with water in many places. The percentage of total rainfall that directly leaves the catchment as storm runoff (also called runoff coefficient) is 8%.

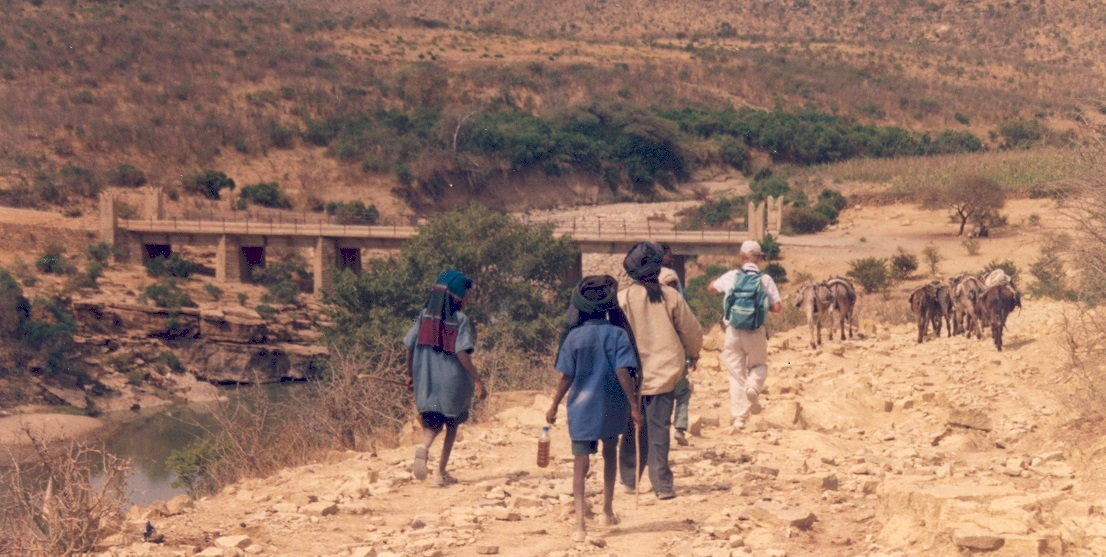
1960s bridge on Giba River at the east of Debre Nazret

The total amount of sediment that is transported by this river amounts to 3.96 million tonnes per year. Median sediment concentration in the river water is 10 grammes per litre, but may go up to 42 g/L. The highest sediment concentrations occur at the beginning of the rainy season, when loose soil and dust is washed away by overland flow and ends up in the river. As such water contains many nutrients (locally it is called "aygi"), farmers estimate that it strengthens their cattle, which they will bring to the river. All in all, average sediment yield is 1065 tonnes per km² and per year. All measurements were done at a purposively installed stations, on Giba and Tanqwa rivers, just upstream of their junction, in the years 2006 and 2007.

=== Flash floods ===
Runoff mostly occurs in the form of high runoff discharge events that occur in a very short period (called flash floods). These are related to the steep topography, often little vegetation cover and intense convective rainfall. The peaks of such flash floods have often a 50 to 100 times larger discharge than the preceding baseflow. These flash floods mostly occur during the evening or night, because the convective rain showers occur in the afternoon.

=== Changes over time ===
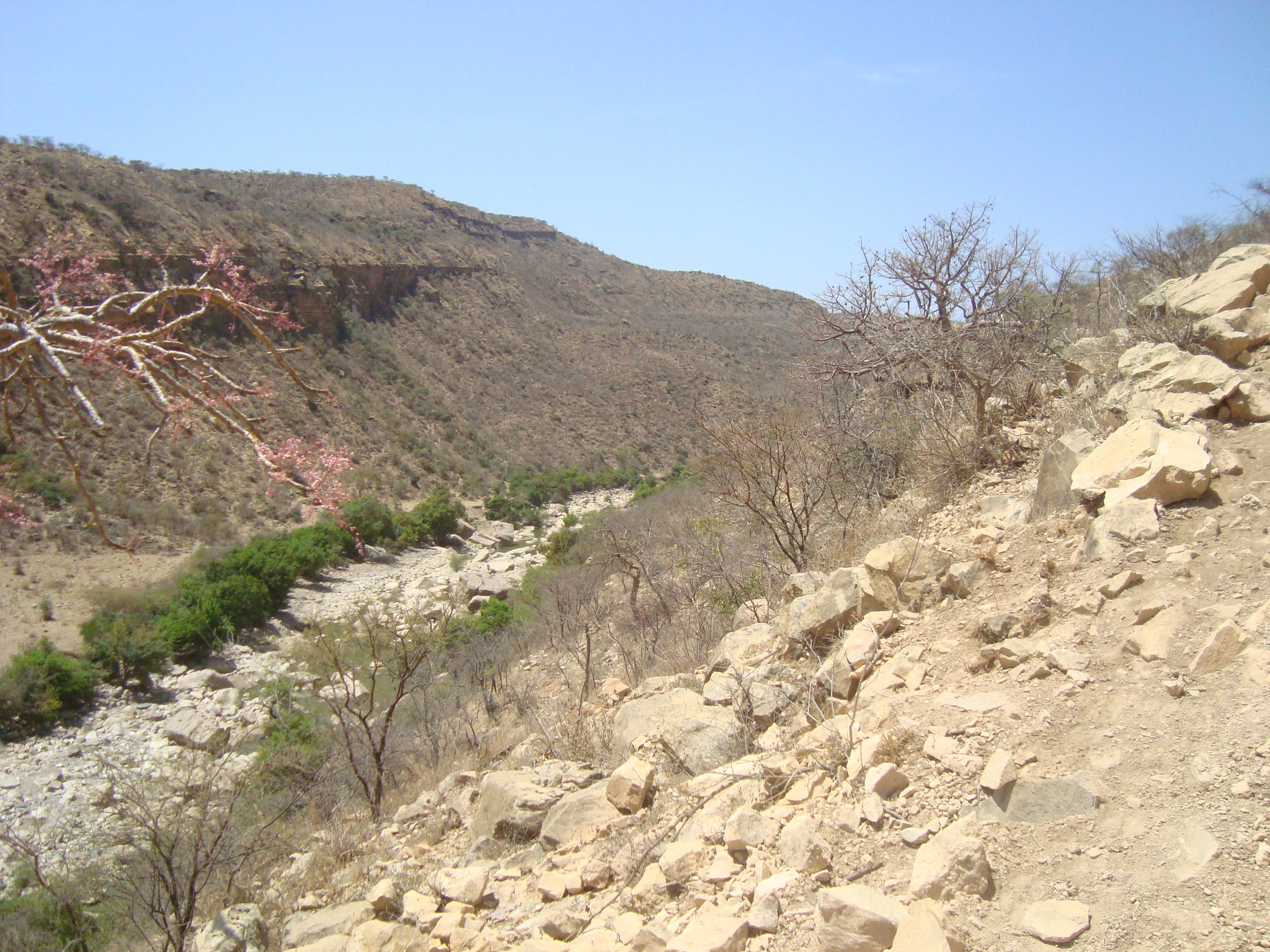
Giba River near the outlet of May Gabat, at left a flowering incense tree

Evidence given by Italian aerial photographs of the catchment, taken in the 1930s show that 49% of the catchment was covered with woody vegetation (against 35% in 2014). This vegetation could slow down runoff and the runoff coefficient was smaller (5% in 1935 against 8% in 2014). As a consequence, discharges in the river were less and the river was narrower than today. Up to the 1980s, there was strong pressure on the environment, and much vegetation disappeared. This river had its greatest discharges and width in that period.

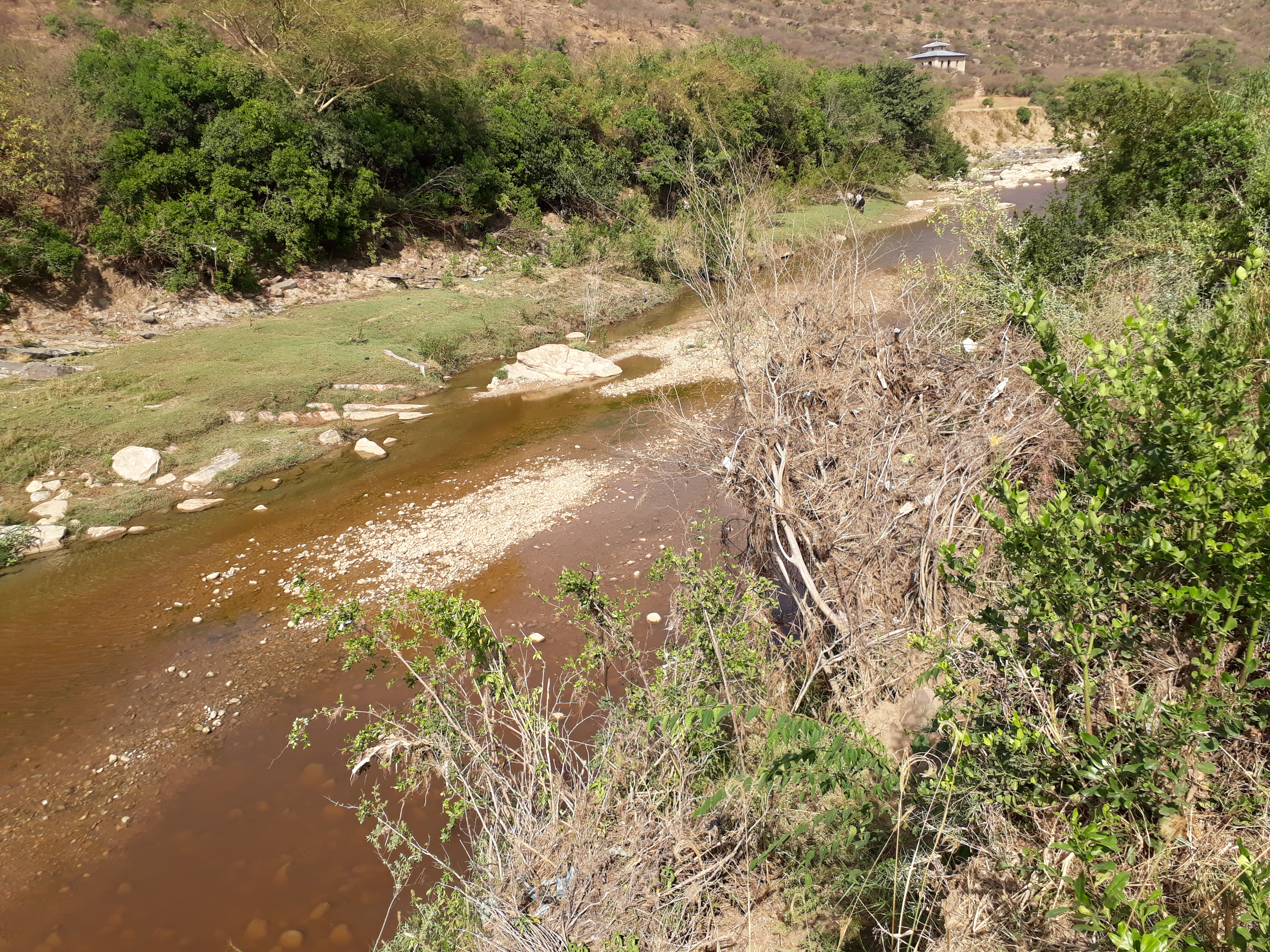
Giba river at Inda Mihtsun

The magnitude of floods in this river has however been decreased in recent years due to interventions in the catchment. At Gemgema, Afedena, May Be'ati and on many other steep slopes, exclosures have been established; the dense vegetation largely contributes to enhanced infiltration, less flooding and better baseflow. Physical conservation structures such as stone bunds and check dams also intercept runoff.

== Irrigated agriculture ==
Besides springs and reservoirs, irrigation is strongly dependent on the river’s baseflow. Such irrigated agriculture is important in meeting the demands for food security and poverty reduction. Irrigated lands are established in the narrow alluvial plains all along the river, mostly using pump irrigation. Very often tropical fruits are grown in these gorges as the climate is warmer than the overall surrounding highlands.

== Transhumance towards the river gorge ==
The valley bottoms in the gorge of this river, for instance at Inda Mihtsun, have been identified as a transhumance destination zone. Transhumance takes place in the summer rainy season, when the lands near the villages are occupied by crops. Young shepherds will take the village cattle down to the gorge and overnight in small caves. The gorges are particularly attractive as a transhumance destination zone, because there is water and good growth of semi-natural vegetation.

== Boulders and pebbles in the river bed ==
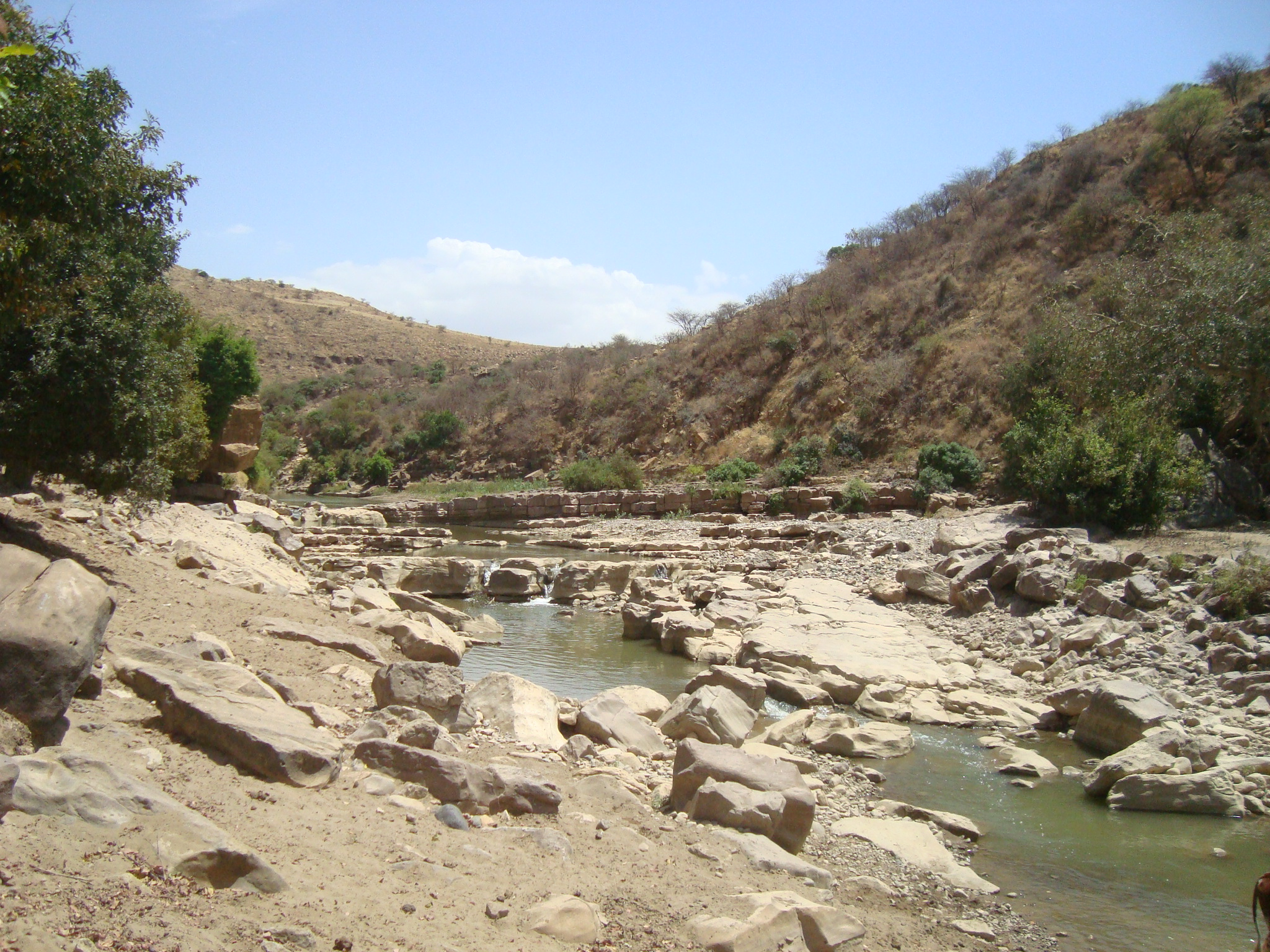
Giba cascading over Antalo Limestone near the confluence with May Gabat

Boulders and pebbles encountered in the river bed can originate from any location higher up in the catchment. In the uppermost stretches of the river, only rock fragments of the upper lithological units will be present in the river bed, whereas more downstream one may find a more comprehensive mix of all lithologies crossed by the river. From upstream to downstream, the following lithological units occur in the catchment.

- Phonolite plugs
- Upper basalt
- Interbedded lacustrine deposits
- Lower basalt
- Amba Aradam Formation
- Antalo Limestone
- Adigrat Sandstone
- Edaga Arbi Glacials
- Quaternary alluvium and freshwater tufa

Logically, in the uppermost stretches of the river, only the pebbles and boulders of the upper lithological units will be present in the river bed, whereas more downstream one may find a more comprehensive mix of all lithologies crossed by the river.

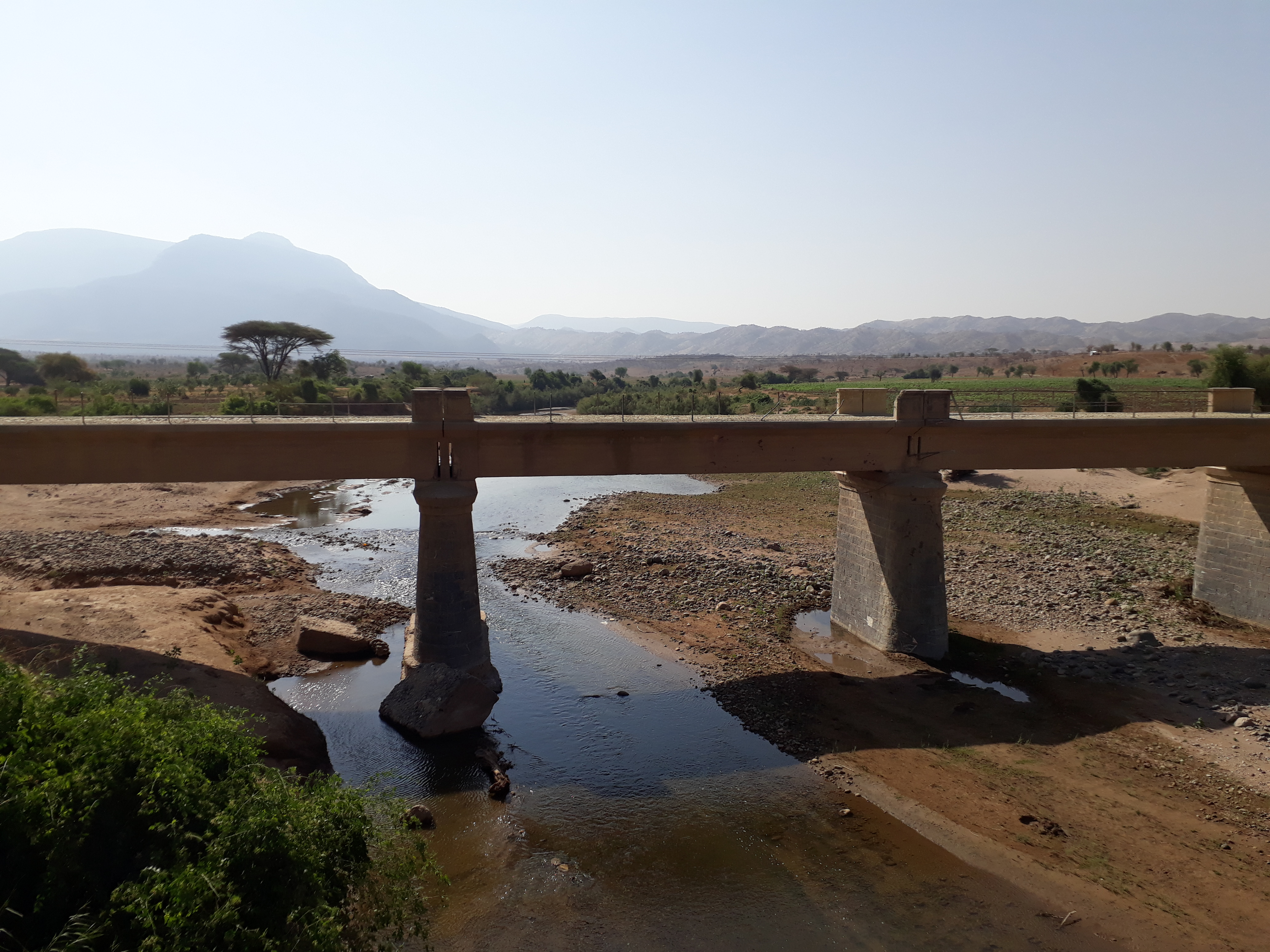
Lower Giba bridge

== Natural boundary ==
During its course, this river three different district ("woreda") borders. On the various parts:

- Upper Giba: border between Dogu’a Tembien and Inderta
- Middle Giba: border between Dogu’a Tembien and Saharti Samre
- Lower Giba: border between Kola Tembien and Abergele (woreda)

== Trekking along the river ==
Trekking routes have been established across and along this river. The tracks are not marked on the ground but can be followed using downloaded .GPX files.

- Trek 15, along the middle course of Giba
- Trek 22, across the Giba gorge in Debre Nazret
- Trek G, across the Giba gorge in Amanit
- Treks S1 and S2, across the Giba gorge in Abergele (woreda)

In the rainy season, flash floods may occur and it is advised not to follow the river bed. Frequently, it is then also impossible to wade across the river.

== See also ==
- List of Ethiopian rivers
