= May Harena =

River in the Tembien highlands of Ethiopia

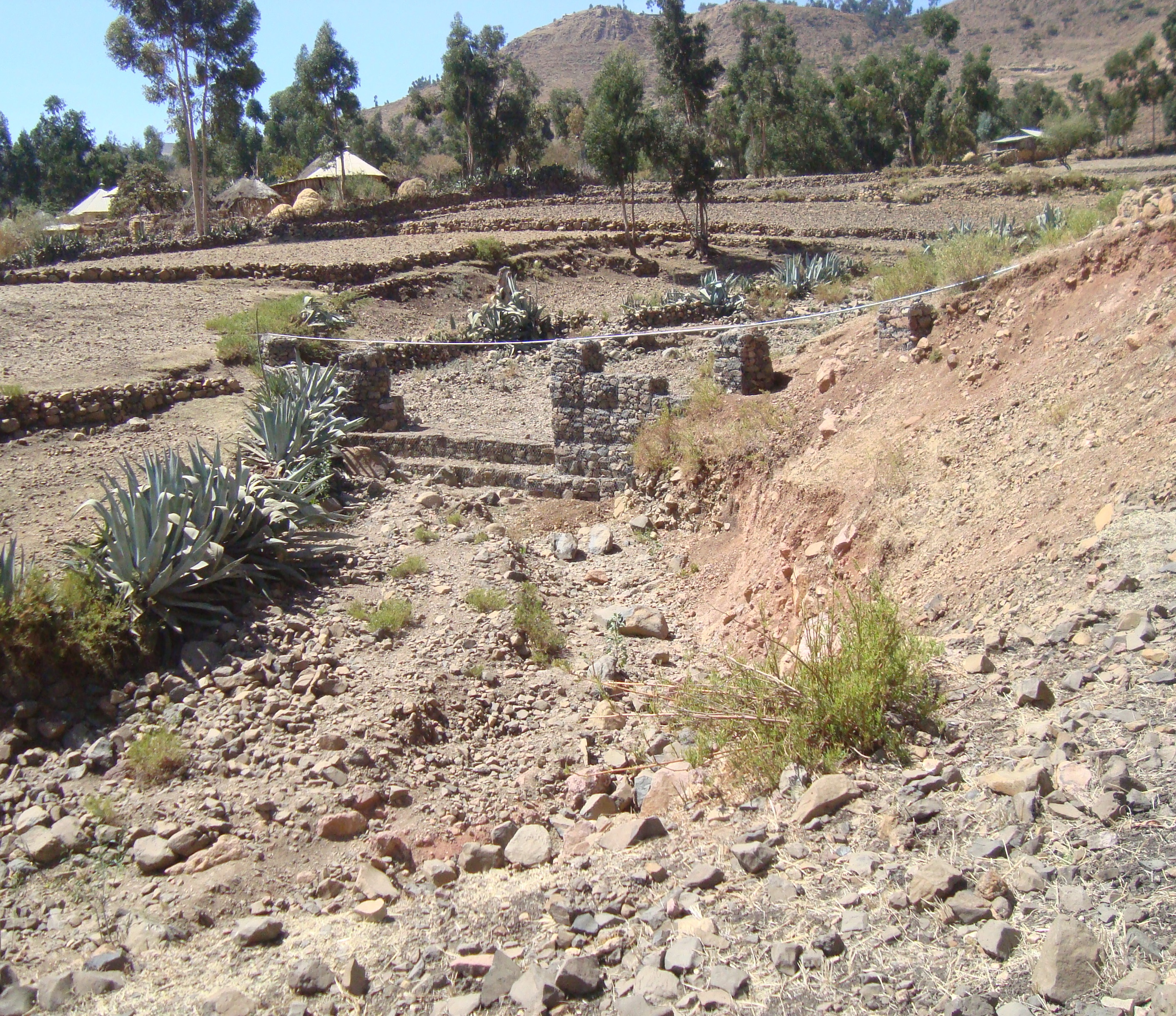
- The May Harena River at Harena

- May Harena in Dogu’a Tembien
- Etymology: After the homonymous village

Location
- Country: Ethiopia
- Region: Tigray Region
- District (woreda): Dogu’a Tembien

Physical characteristics
- Source
  - location: Valley head east of Hagere Selam
  - elevation: 2,480 m (8,140 ft)
- Mouth: May Zegzeg River
  - location: May Addi Abagiè at the border of Mika'el Abiy and Haddinnet municipalities
  - coordinates: 13.644°N 39.194°E
  - elevation: 2,270 m (7,450 ft)
- Length: 2.1 km (1.3 mi)
- Width
  - average: 10 m (33 ft)

Basin features
- Progression: May Zegzeg→ Rubaksa→ Giba→ Tekezé→ Atbarah→ Nile→ Mediterranean Sea
- River system: Seasonal river
- Landmarks: Hagere Selam town
- Topography: Mountains and deep gorges

The May Harena is a river of the Nile basin. Rising in the mountains of Dogu’a Tembien in northern Ethiopia, it flows eastward to empty finally in the Giba and Tekezé River.

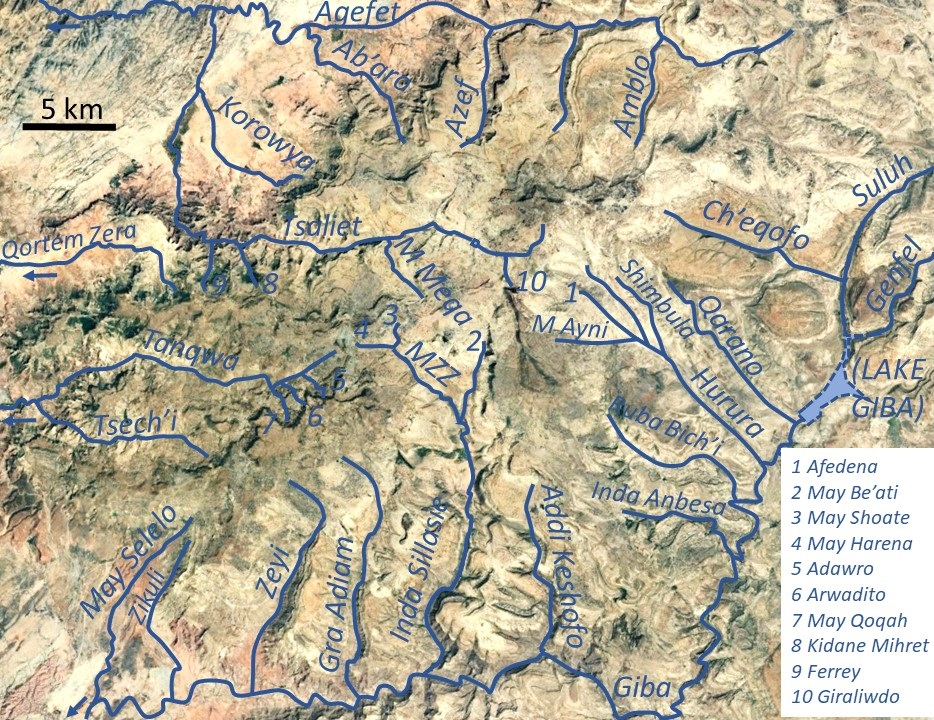
The river in the radial drainage network of Dogu’a Tembien

== Characteristics ==
The May Harena is a confined ephemeral river with an average slope gradient of 100 metres per kilometre.

== Hydrology ==
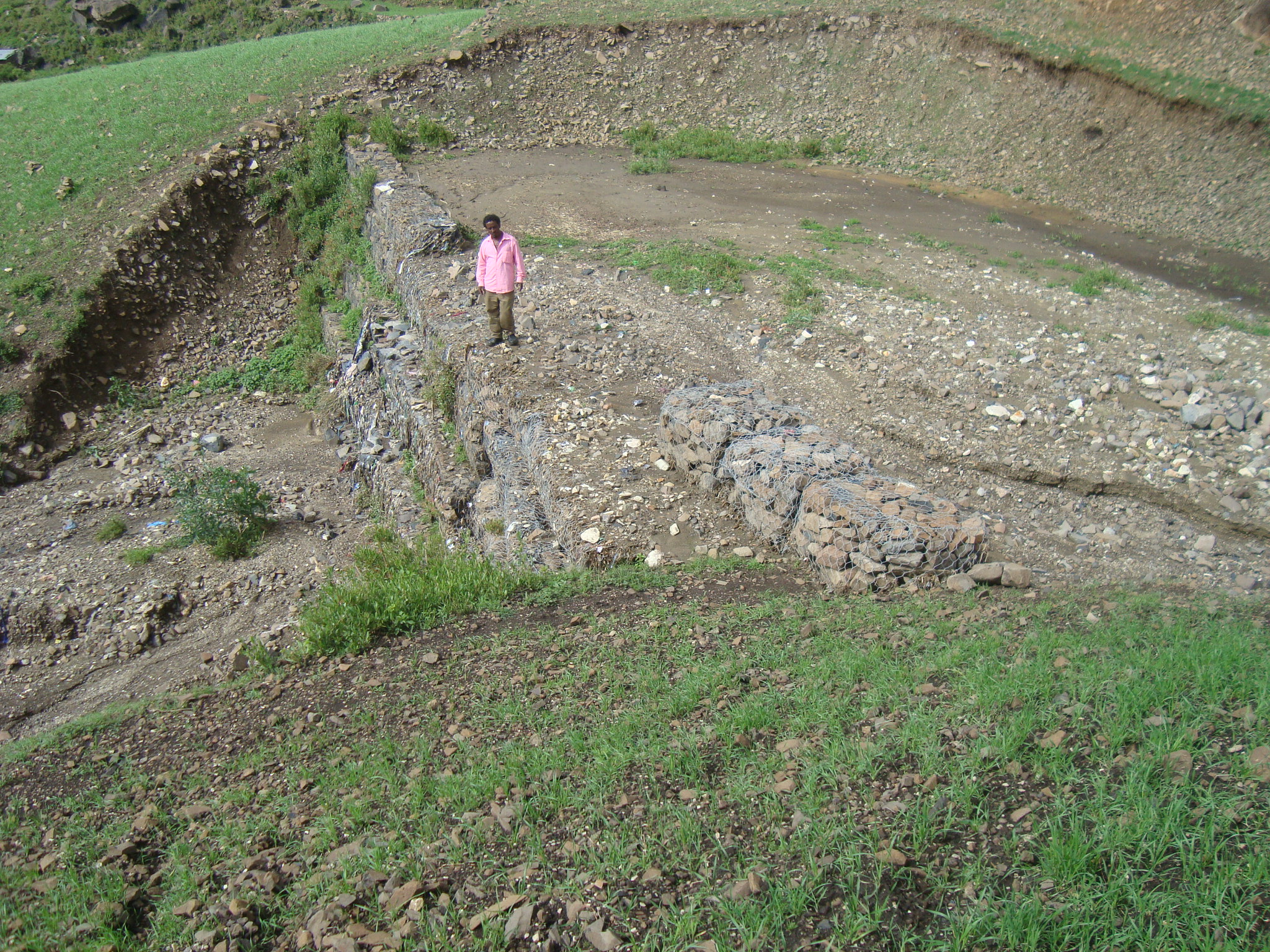
Check dam in upper May Harena aiming at buffering urban drainage – note evidence of urban waste on the gabion mesh

River discharge in May Harena is highly seasonal, with the river only carrying water in the rainy season, after rain events. The problem is exacerbated by the fact that most of the urban drainage from Hagere Selam is rapidly directed to this river. Conservation activities (such as those by the Selam WatSani project aim at buffering these floods. There is however a strong contrast with better regularised adjacent May Sho'ate River.

== Flash floods and flood buffering ==
Runoff mostly happens in the form of high runoff discharge events that occur in a very short period (called flash floods). These are related to the steep topography, often little vegetation cover and intense convective rainfall. The peaks of such flash floods have often a 50 to 100 times larger discharge than the preceding baseflow. The magnitude of floods in this river has somewhat been decreased due to interventions in the catchment. On some steep slopes, exclosures have been established; the dense vegetation largely contributes to enhanced infiltration, less flooding and better baseflow. Physical conservation structures such as stone bunds and check dams also intercept runoff.

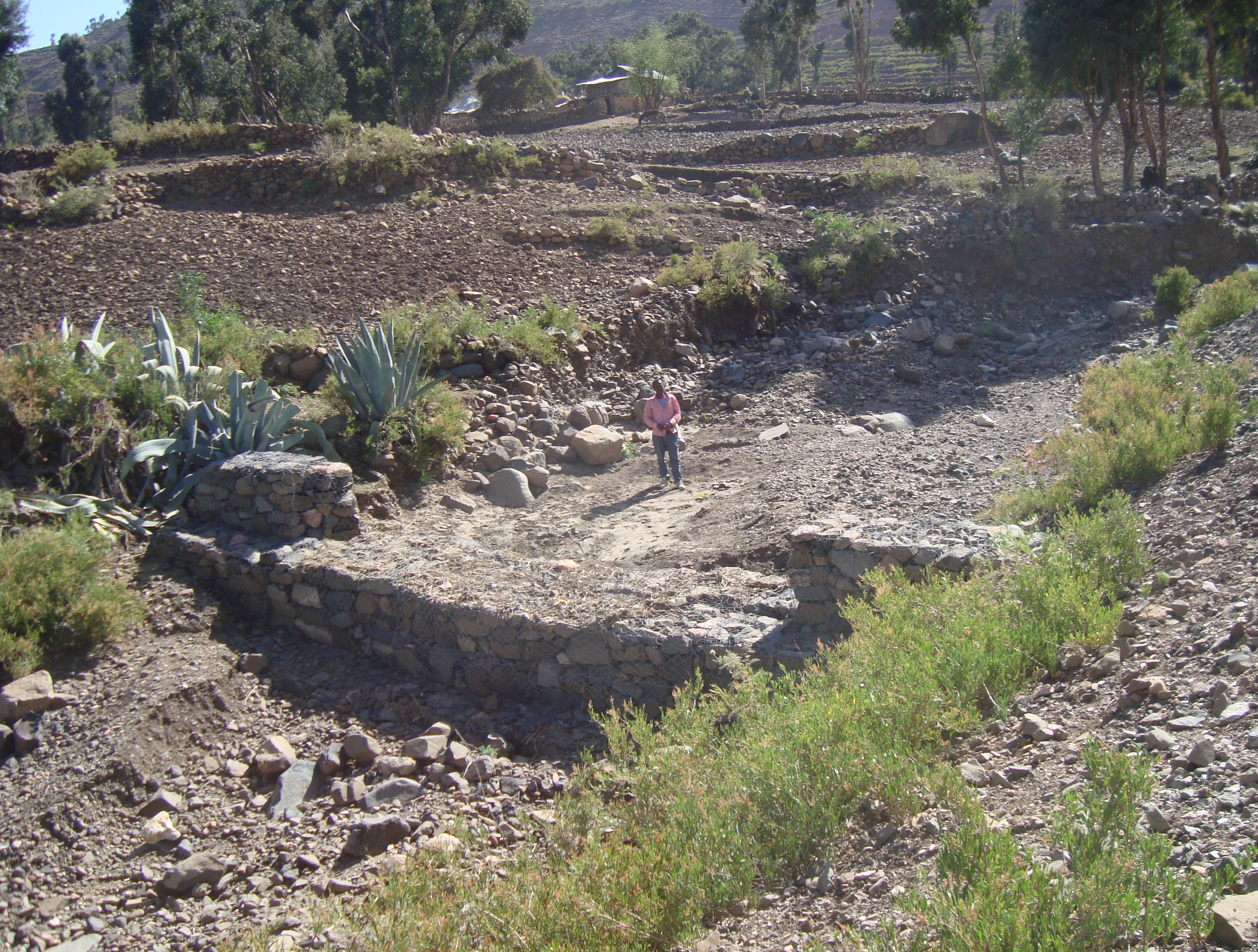
Check dam on May Harena

== Boulders and pebbles in the river bed ==
Boulders and pebbles encountered in the river bed can originate from any location higher up in the catchment. In the uppermost stretches of the river, only rock fragments of the upper lithological units will be present in the river bed, whereas more downstream one may find a more comprehensive mix of all lithologies crossed by the river. From upstream to downstream, the following lithological units occur in the catchment.

- Upper basalt
- Interbedded lacustrine deposits
- Lower basalt
- Amba Aradam Formation
- Antalo Limestone

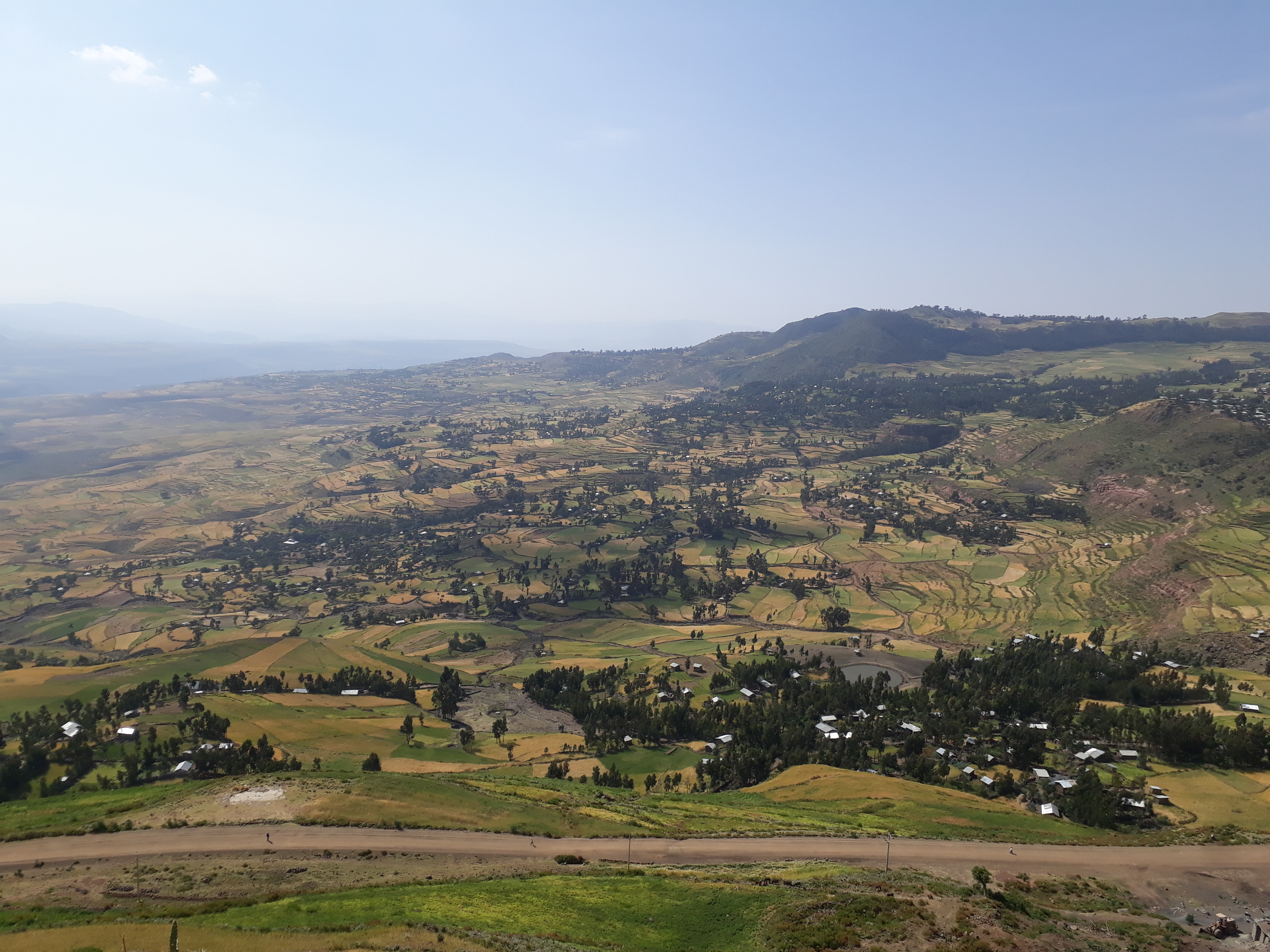
May Harena catchment

== Trekking along the river ==
Trekking routes have been established across and along this river. The tracks are not marked on the ground but can be followed using downloaded .GPX files. Trek 12 V runs parallel to the river, on its northern side.

== See also ==
- List of Ethiopian rivers
