= Ch'eqofo River =

River in the Tembien highlands of Ethiopia

Ch’eqofo
- Ch’eqofo River in Dogu’a Tembien

Location
- Country: Ethiopia
- Region: Tigray Region
- District (woreda): Dogu’a Tembien

Physical characteristics
- Source
  - location: Addilal
  - elevation: 2,330 m (7,640 ft)
- Mouth: Giba River
  - location: Down from Miqmat’ Awra in Emni Ankelalu municipality
  - coordinates: 13.674°N 39.411°E
  - elevation: 1,825 m (5,988 ft)
- Length: 13 km (8.1 mi)
- Width
  - average: 15 m (49 ft)

Basin features
- Progression: Giba→ Tekezé→ Atbarah→ Nile→ Mediterranean Sea
- River system: Seasonal/permanent river
- Topography: Mountains and deep gorges

The Ch’eqofo is a river of the Nile basin. Rising in the mountains of Dogu’a Tembien in northern Ethiopia, it flows southwestward to empty finally in the Giba and Tekezé River.

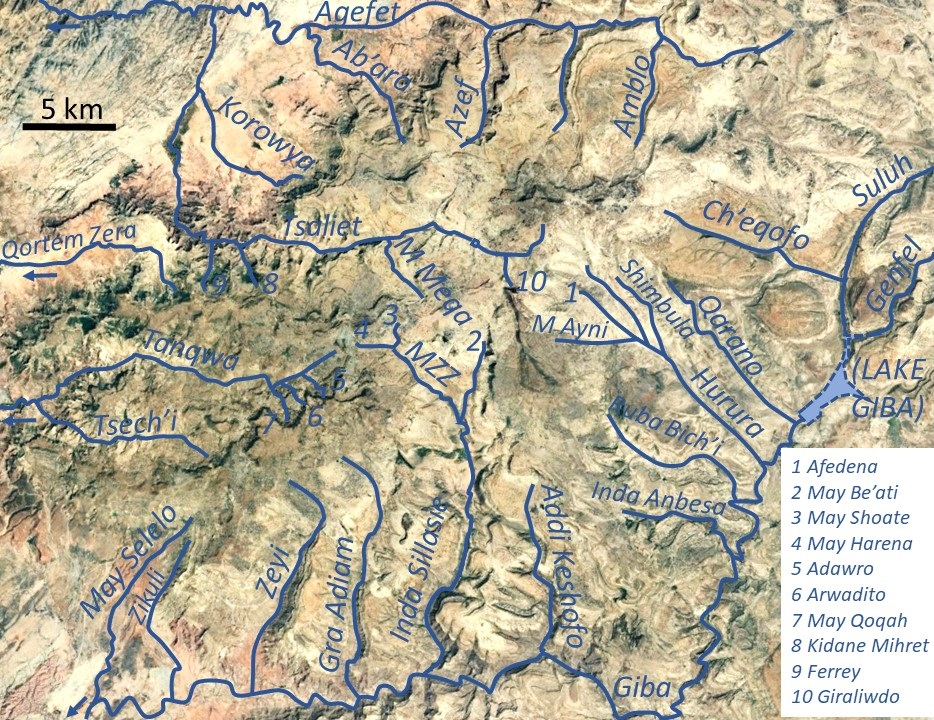
The river in the radial drainage network of Dogu’a Tembien

== Characteristics ==
It is a confined ephemeral river, locally meandering in its narrow alluvial plain, with an average slope gradient of 39 metres per kilometre. With its tributaries, the river has cut a deep gorge.

== Flash floods and flood buffering ==
Runoff mostly happens in the form of high runoff discharge events that occur in a very short period (called flash floods). These are related to the steep topography, often little vegetation cover and intense convective rainfall. The peaks of such flash floods have often a 50 to 100 times larger discharge than the preceding baseflow. The magnitude of floods in this river has however been decreased due to interventions in the catchment. On steep slopes, exclosures have been established; the dense vegetation largely contributes to enhanced infiltration, less flooding and better baseflow. Physical conservation structures such as stone bunds and check dams also intercept runoff.

== Boulders and pebbles in the river bed ==
Boulders and pebbles encountered in the river bed can originate from any location higher up in the catchment. In the uppermost stretches of the river, only rock fragments of the upper lithological units will be present in the river bed, whereas more downstream one may find a more comprehensive mix of all lithologies crossed by the river. From upstream to downstream, the following lithological units occur in the catchment.

- Lower basalt
- Amba Aradam Formation
- Mekelle Dolerite
- Antalo Limestone
- Quaternary freshwater tufa

== Transhumance towards the gorge ==
Transhumance takes place in the summer rainy season, when the lands near the villages are occupied by crops. Young shepherds will take the village cattle down to the gorge and overnight in small caves. The gorges are particularly attractive as a transhumance destination zone, because there is water and good growth of semi-natural vegetation.

== Trekking along the river ==
Trekking routes have been established across and along this river. The tracks are not marked on the ground but can be followed using downloaded .GPX files. Trek 24 follows the southern water divide, parallel to the river, and gives panoramic views over the Ch’eqofo valley. In the rainy season, flash floods may occur and it is advised not to follow the river bed.

== See also ==
- List of Ethiopian rivers
