= Ruba Bich'i River =

River in the Tembien highlands of Ethiopia

Ruba Bich’i
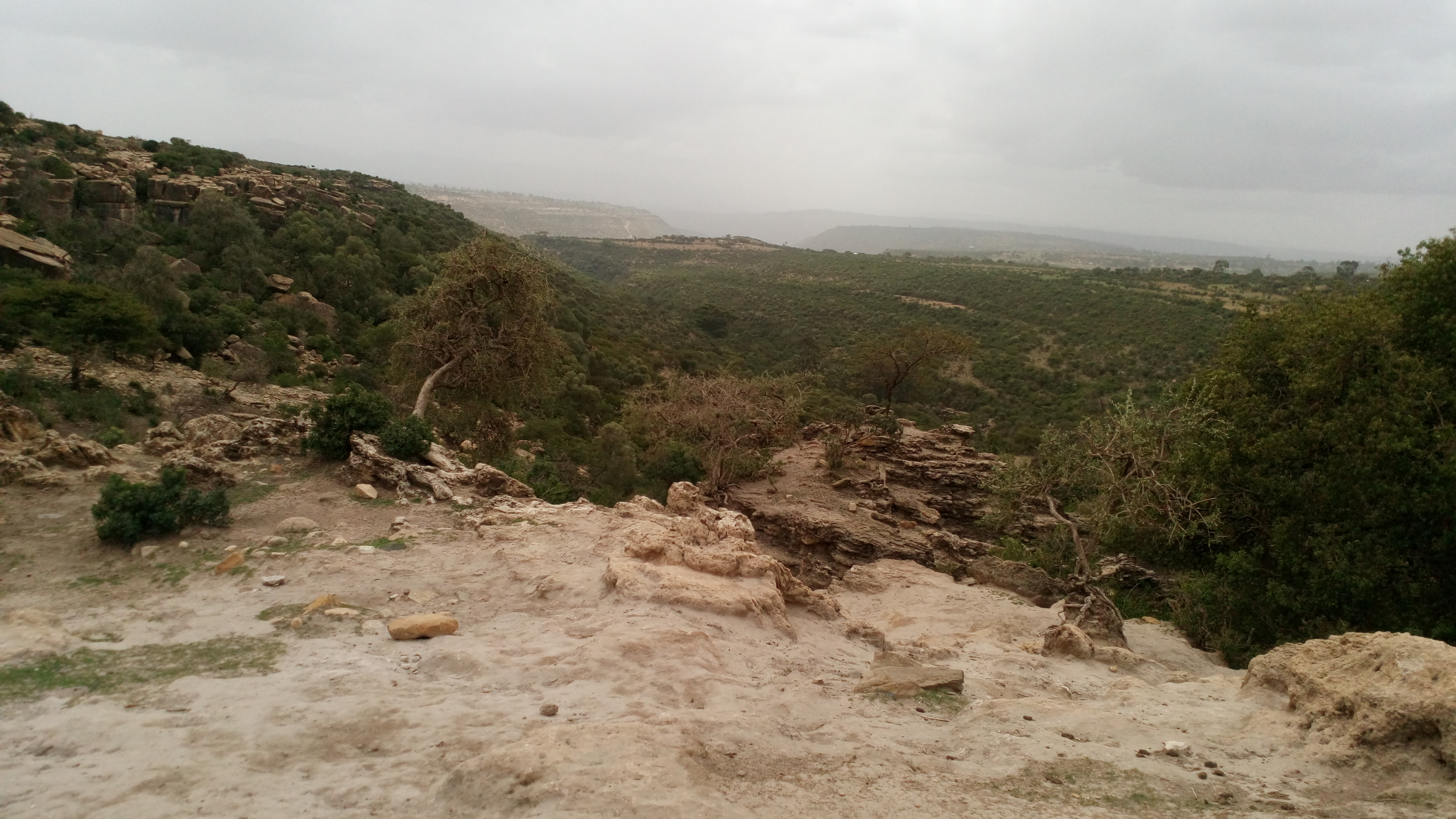
- The upper Ruba Bich’i gorge at Lafa

- Ruba Bich’i River in Dogu’a Tembien

Location
- Country: Ethiopia
- Region: Tigray Region
- District (woreda): Dogu’a Tembien

Physical characteristics
- Source
  - location: Addi Ganfur in Addi Azmera municipality
  - elevation: 2,222 m (7,290 ft)
- 2nd source: Imba Wahti
  - location: Lafa in Mizane Birhan municipality
- Mouth: Giba River
  - location: Downslope from Girasa Goh
  - coordinates: 13.571°N 39.359°E
  - elevation: 1,725 m (5,659 ft)
- Length: 13 km (8.1 mi)
- Width
  - average: 12 m (39 ft)

Basin features
- Progression: Giba→ Tekezé→ Atbarah→ Nile→ Mediterranean Sea
- River system: Permanent river
- Landmarks: Lafa tufa dam and rock church
- Topography: Mountains and deep gorges

The Ruba Bich’i is a river of the Nile basin. Rising in the mountains of Dogu’a Tembien in northern Ethiopia, it flows southeastward to empty directly in the Giba and further in Tekezé River.

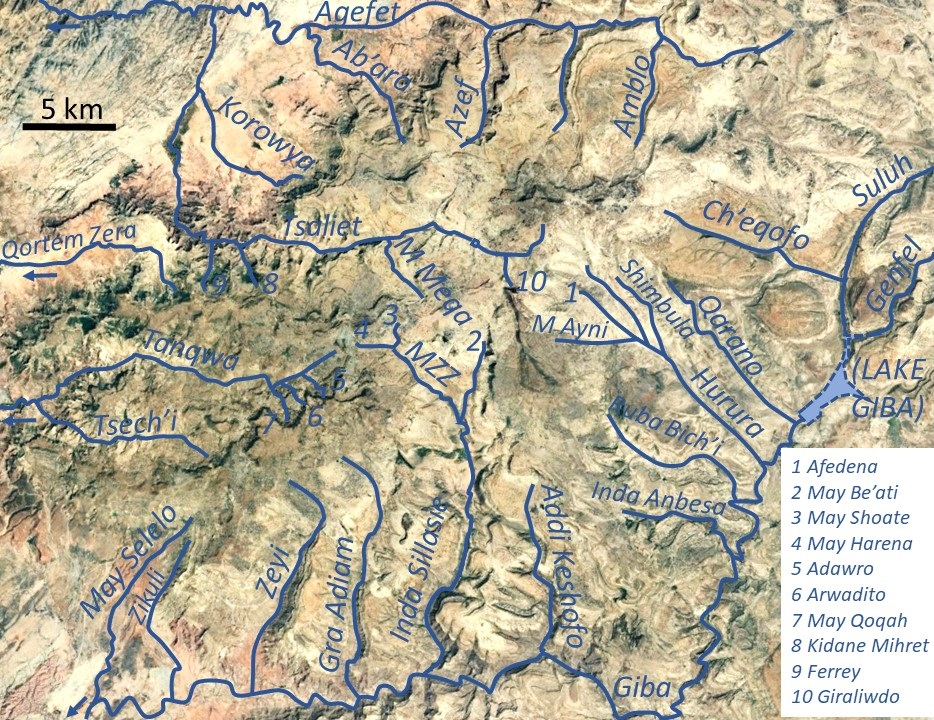
The river in the radial drainage network of Dogu’a Tembien

== Characteristics ==
The Ruba Bich’i is a confined ephemeral river, locally meandering in its narrow alluvial plain, with an average slope gradient of 38 metres per kilometre. With its tributaries, the river has cut a deep gorge.

== Flash floods and flood buffering ==
Runoff mostly happens in the form of high runoff discharge events that occur in a very short period (called flash floods). These are related to the steep topography, often little vegetation cover and intense convective rainfall. The peaks of such flash floods have often a 50 to 100 times larger discharge than the preceding baseflow. The magnitude of floods in this river has however been decreased due to interventions in the catchment. At Lafa, Mi'am Atali and on other steep slopes, exclosures have been established; the dense vegetation largely contributes to enhanced infiltration, less flooding and better baseflow. Physical conservation structures such as stone bunds and check dams also intercept runoff.

== Transhumance towards the gorge ==
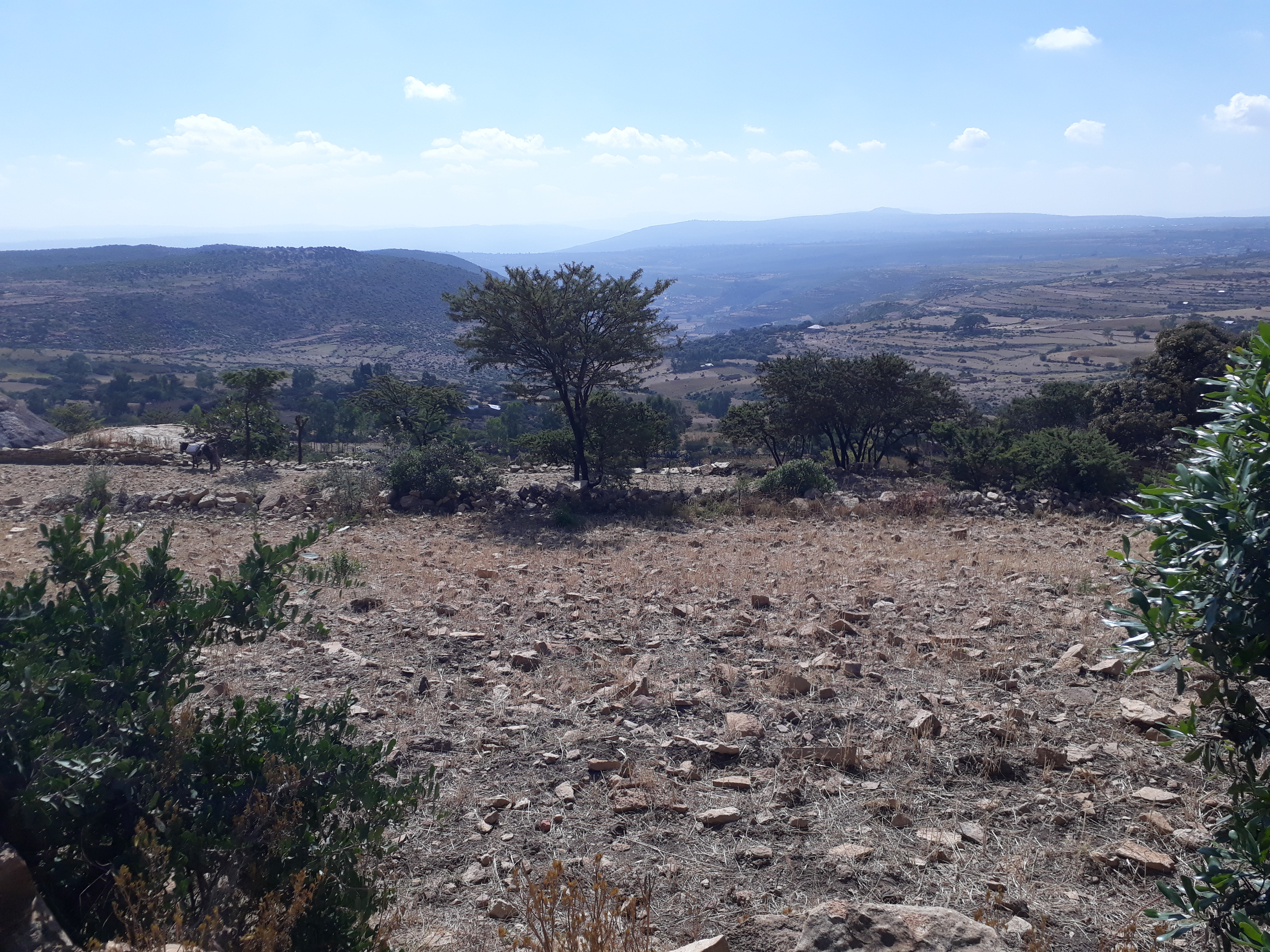
View over Ruba Bich’i valley from Zerfenti

Transhumance takes place in the summer rainy season, when the lands near the villages are occupied by crops. Young shepherds will take the village cattle down to the gorge and overnight in small caves. The gorges are particularly attractive as a transhumance destination zone, because there is water and good growth of semi-natural vegetation.

== Boulders and pebbles in the river bed ==
Boulders and pebbles encountered in the river bed can originate from any location higher up in the catchment. In the uppermost stretches of the river, only rock fragments of the upper lithological units will be present in the river bed, whereas more downstream one may find a more comprehensive mix of all lithologies crossed by the river. From upstream to downstream, the following lithological units occur in the catchment.

- Antalo Limestone
- Quaternary freshwater tufa

== Trekking along the river ==
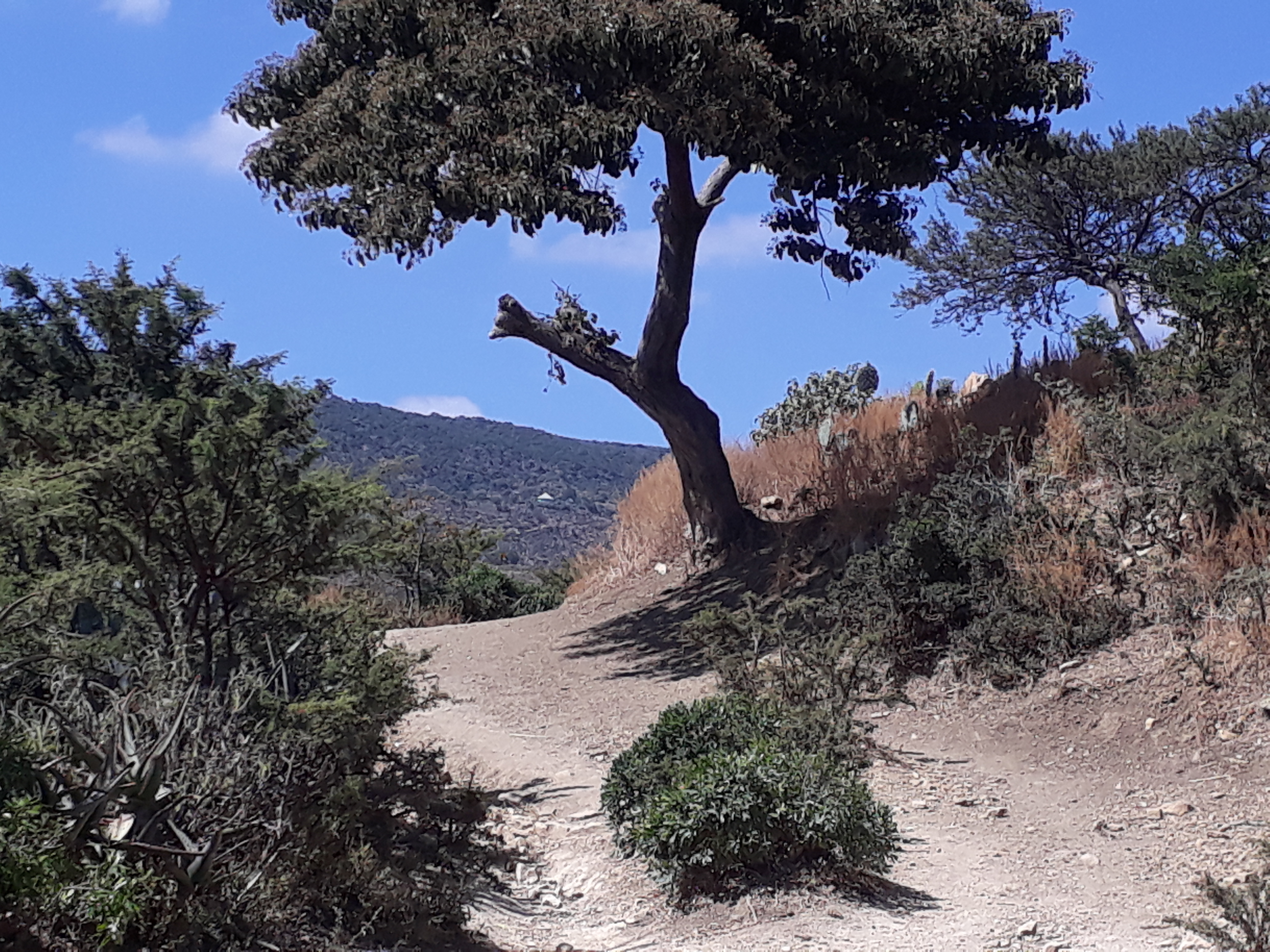
Along trek 14 in upper Ruba Bich’i catchment

Trekking routes have been established across and along this river. The tracks are not marked on the ground but can be followed using downloaded .GPX files. Trek 14 and trek 17 visit the upper part of Ruba Bich’i catchment.

== See also ==
- List of Ethiopian rivers
