= Alaji Basalts =

- Stratigraphic range: Miocene
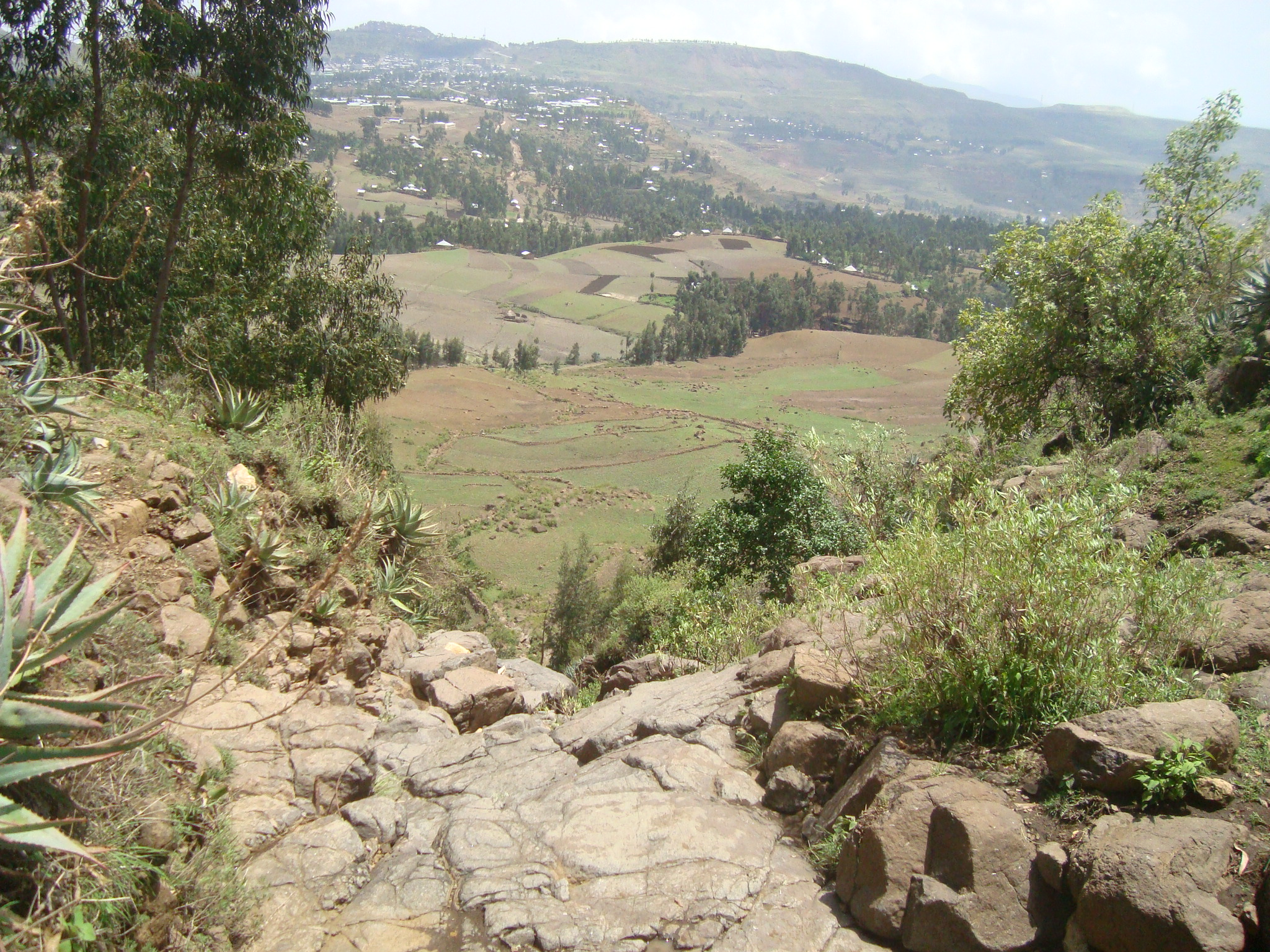
- Mt. Gumawta, Tembien highlands
- Type: Geological formation
- Underlies: Pliocene shield volcanoes, locally
- Overlies: Ashangi Basalts, Intra-volcanic sedimentary rock
- Thickness: 220 m (720 ft)

Lithology
- Primary: Basalt, Rhyolite
- Other: Trachyte

Location
- Coordinates: 12.9817°N 39.5198°E
- Region: Tigray
- Country: Ethiopia
- Extent: Ethiopian Highlands

Type section
- Named for: Imba Alaje Mountain
- Named by: William Thomas Blanford
- Alaji Basalts (Ethiopia)

The Alaji Basalts are the youngest series of the Ethiopian flood basalts. The most recent flows are 15 million years old.

== Name and definition ==
The name was coined by geologist William Thomas Blanford, who accompanied the British Expedition to Abyssinia in 1868, after the Imba Alaje mountain.

== Stratigraphic context ==
The Alaji Basalts are the uppermost Tertiary flood basalts in Ethiopia. Locally they are covered by Pliocene shield volcanoes, such as the Simien Mountains, or Mount Guna. These flows have been deposited on the lower Ashangi Basalts and locally on intra-volcanic sedimentary rock.

== Environment ==
Like all volcanic rocks, the Alaji Basalts originate from initial melting of the Earth's mantle. After extrusion, the magmatic structures form at the surface. Common volcanic structures such as lava tubes or ropy lavas are absent in the Alaji Basalts, but (columnar joints) are omnipresent. The basalts comprise successive flows. During cooling, newly developed crystals within the lava solidify and develop congealing stress that favours the formation of columnar joints (intersecting fractures). They are perpendicular to the surface of the lava flow: mostly vertical, but sometimes also inclined or almost horizontal.

== Lithology ==
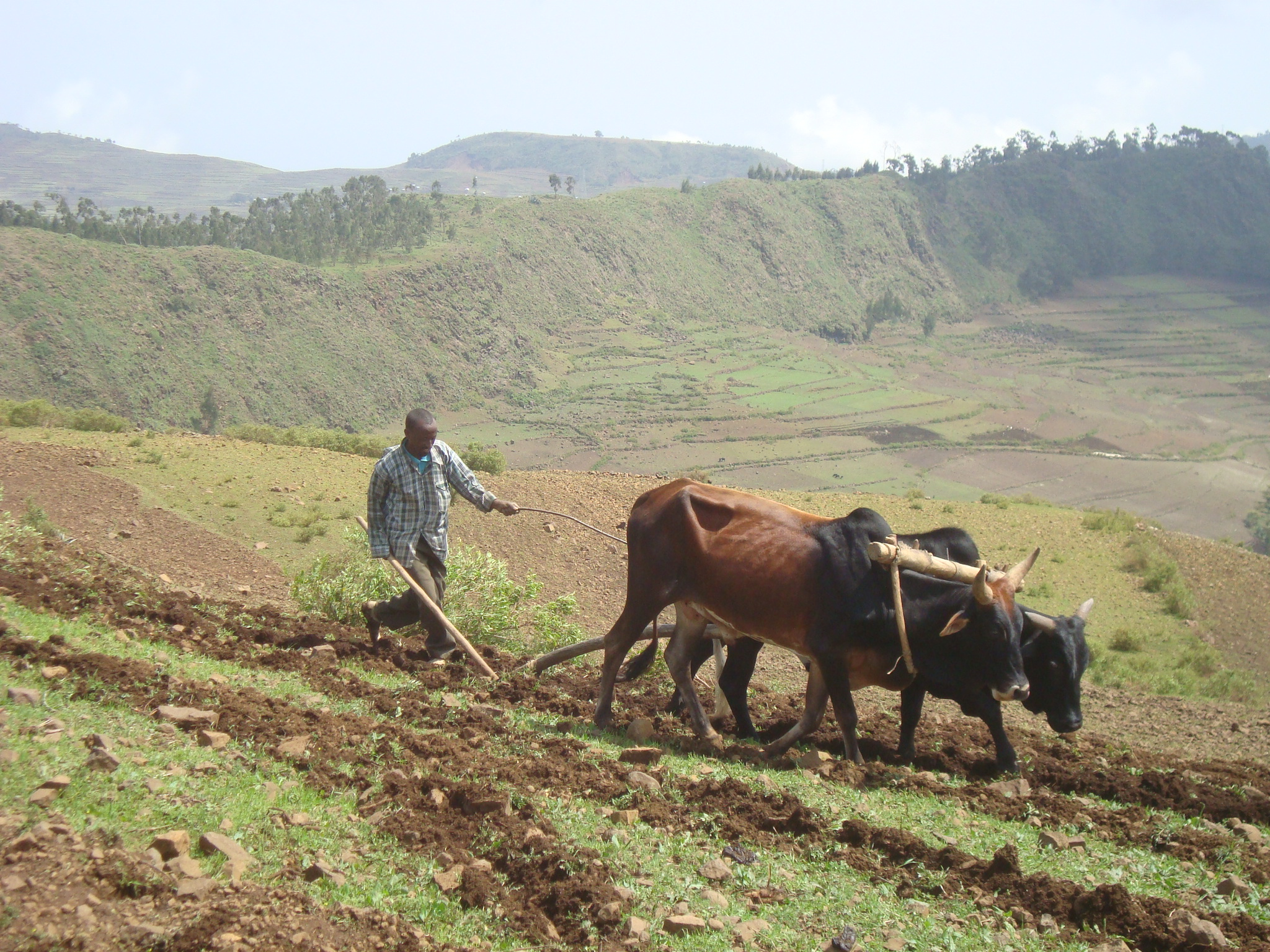
The Bi’en ridge near Hagere Selam in the Tigray Region is composed of Alaji Basalts. Weathering of the rock has led to the occurrence of fertile Luvisols

The Alaji Basalts hold alternating layers of rhyolitic and basaltic rocks. Its thickness varies between 80 and 220 metres. The upper layer is capped by trachytic materials. The lower part of the Alaji Basalts is composed of medium- to fine-grained basalts. The middle succession holds elongated plagioclase-dominated trachytes. The mineralogy of the basaltic rocks is marked by well-aligned elongated pyroxenes and micro-plagioclases. In the mineralogy of the trachytes one notices especially the by twinning of feldspar minerals and a small amount of altered pyroxenes.

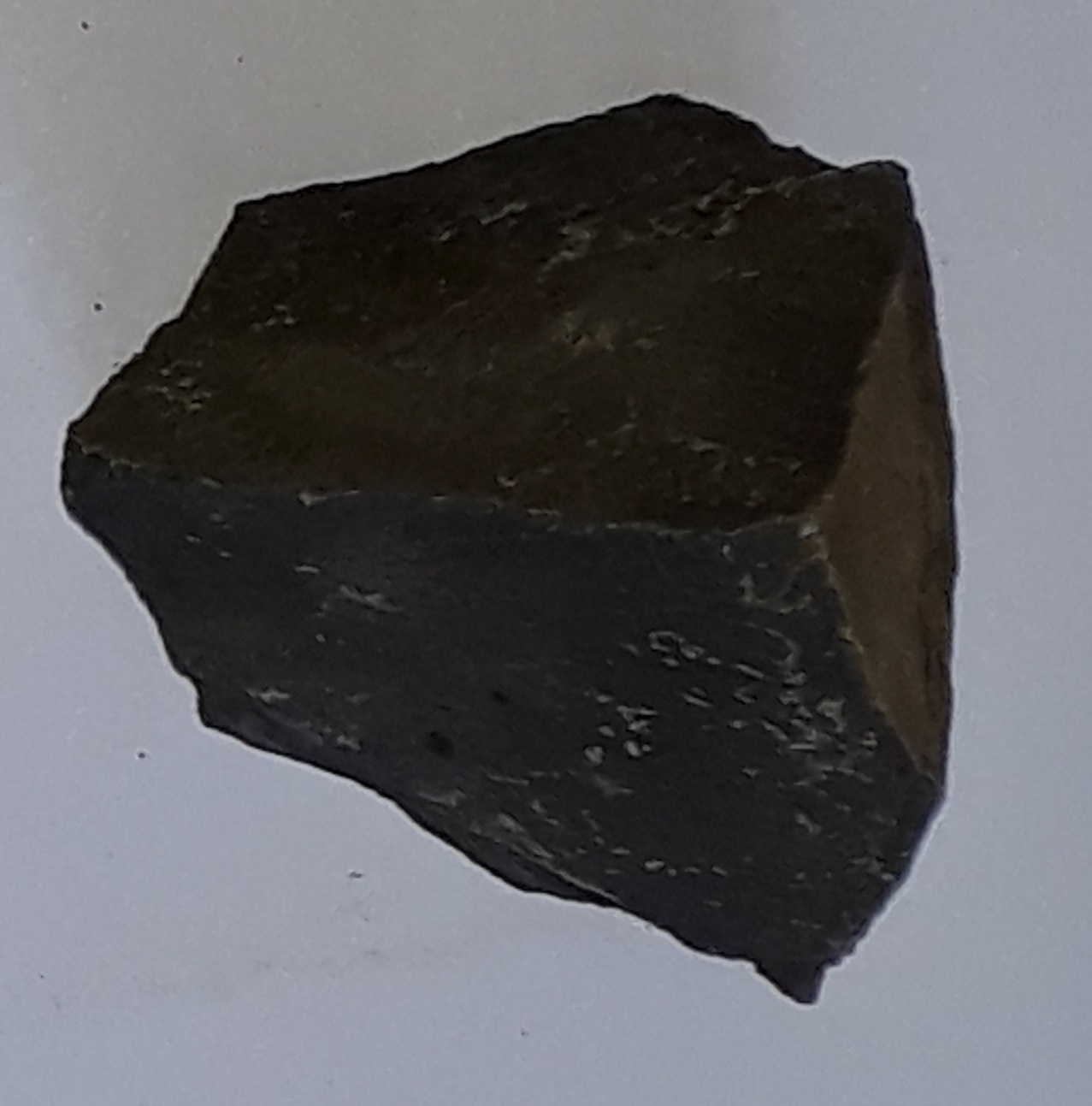
Rock sample of aphanitic basalt, collected at Addi Amyuq pass

== Geographical extent ==
The formation outcrops widely in the Ethiopian Highlands, particularly in the upper landscape positions.
