= Ashangi Basalts =

- Stratigraphic range: Oligocene
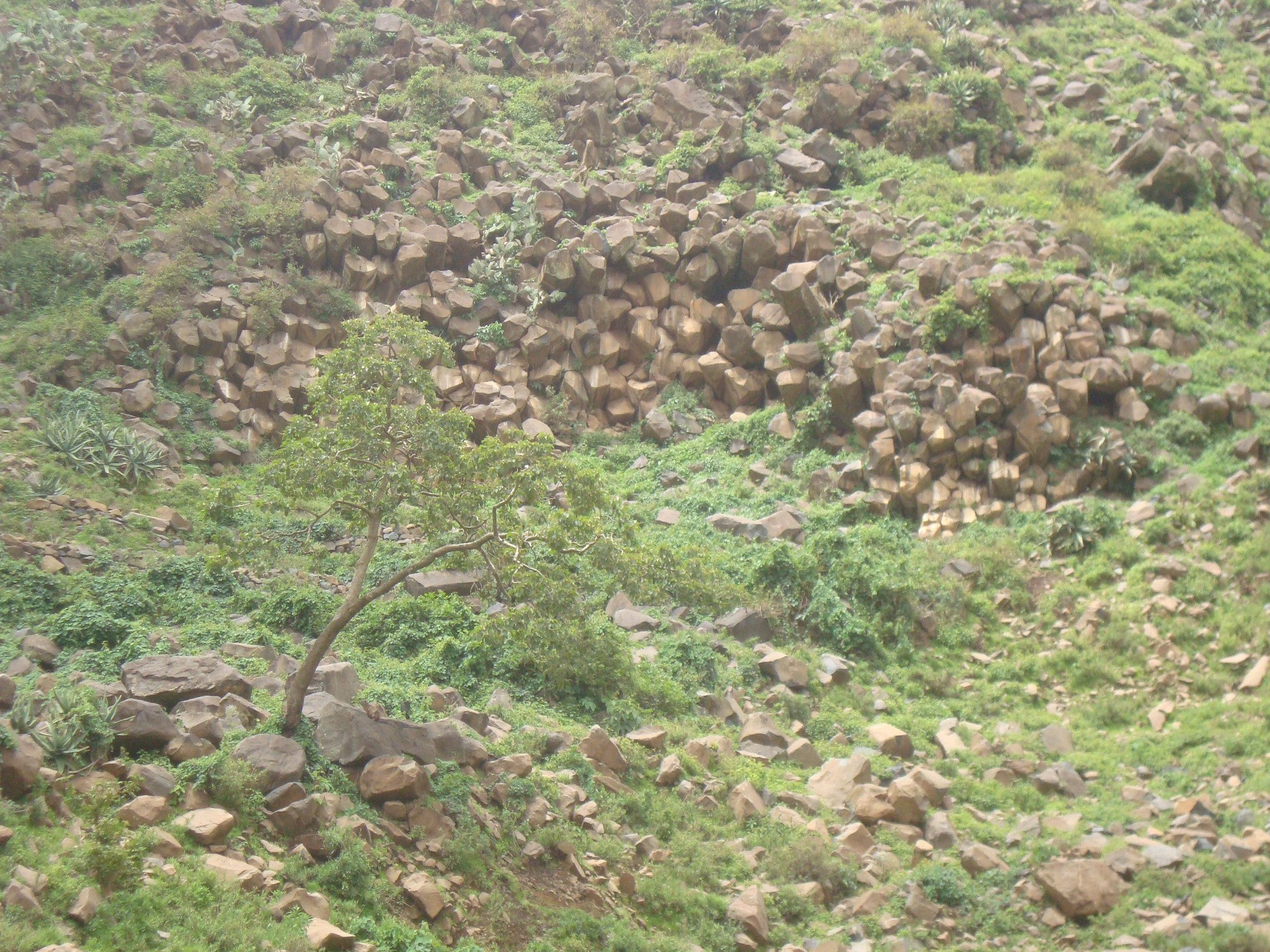
- West of Kerene Dogu'a Tembien)
- Type: Geological formation
- Underlies: Alaji Basalts, Intra-volcanic sedimentary rock
- Overlies: Amba Aradam Formation

Lithology
- Primary: Porphyritic Basalt

Location
- Coordinates: 12.5823°N 39.51984986°E
- Approximate paleocoordinates: 0°N 0°E
- Region: Tigray
- Country: Ethiopia
- Extent: Northern Ethiopian Highlands

Type section
- Named for: Lake Hashenge
- Named by: William Thomas Blanford
- Ashangi Basalts (Ethiopia)

The Ashangi Basalts are the earliest Tertiary volcanic rocks in north Ethiopia, hence they are in the lowest position. These dark porphyritic basalts are separated from the Mesozoic formations below it by basal conglomerates. The basalts hold phenocrysts that developed before the magma reached the earth surface. These basalts are weathered, partially eroded and have a sub-horizontal stratification, particularly at the lower part. This series was created during the first period of the flood basalt eruptions in north Ethiopia, in the Oligocene.

== Name and definition ==
The name was coined by geologist William Thomas Blanford, who accompanied the British Expedition to Abyssinia in 1868, after Lake Hashenge in Tigray, which is surrounded by large outcrops of the formation. So far the nomenclature has not been proposed for recognition to the International Commission on Stratigraphy.

== Stratigraphic context ==
The formation covers Mesozoic sedimentary rocks, particularly Amba Aradam Formation and Adigrat Sandstone. In many places, on its upper side, deposits of intra-volcanic sedimentary rock occur.

== Environment ==
These volcanic rocks formed through melting of Earth's mantle. After magma generation, lava flowed out over the surface, in successive flows. Some part of it disappeared within the next 1 to 3 million years due to weathering and erosion, while other parts remained present. Within the basalt, columnar joints occur as a result of cooling; they are visible along the flanks of the ridges. The columnar joints are perpendicular to the surface of the lava flows; they are mostly vertical, but may also be strongly inclined. The lower succession, the one that overlies the Amba Aradam Formation and the Adigrat Sandstone holds vertical and closely spaced columnar joints. A common characteristic of the columnar joints observed in the Ashangi Basalts is their pentagonal or hexagonal shape (in plan view).

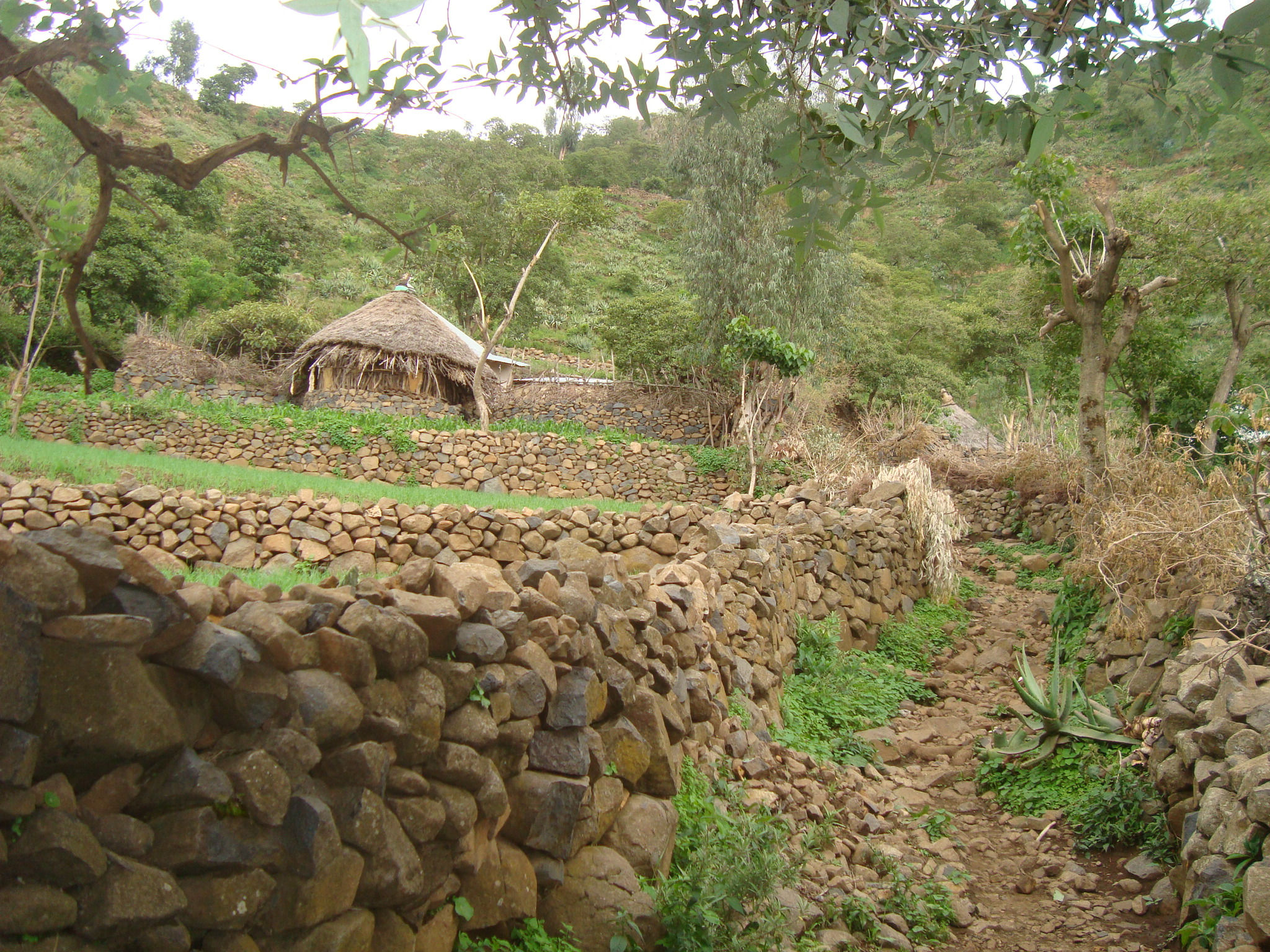
The upper part of Gumuara village in Dogu’a Tembien (Ethiopia) is located on the Ashangi Basalts, as can be seen from the typical building materials of houses and fences

== Lithology ==
The Ashangi Basalts are made of coarse-grained plagioclase minerals, surrounded by a matrix of fine-grained plagioclases and pyroxenes; some iron oxides are also present.

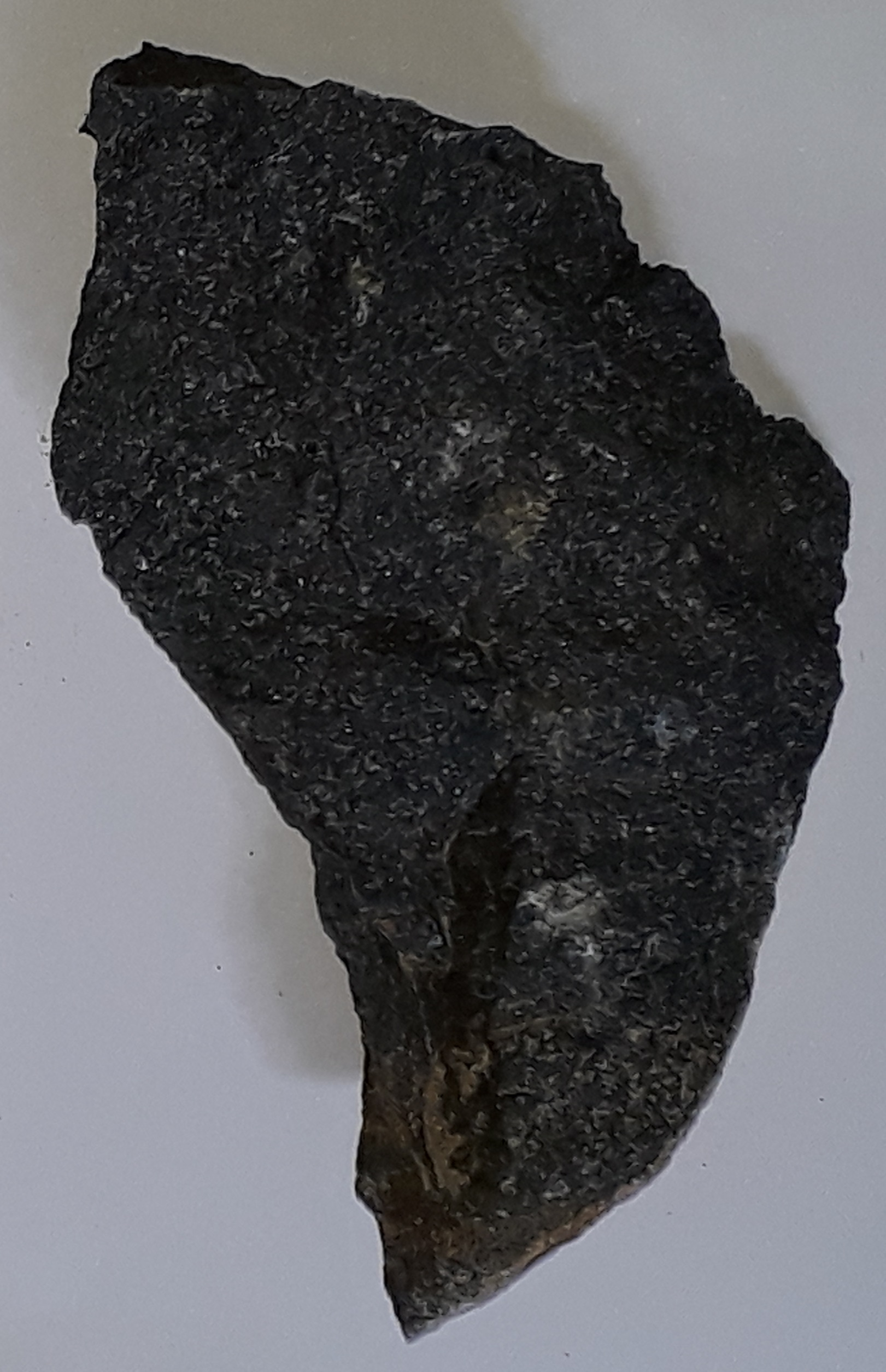
Rock sample of extremely porphyritic basalt, collected at Mashih

== Geographical extent ==
The Ashangi formation occurs widely in Tigray Region, including the May Ch'ew area and Dogu’a Tembien.
