= May Be'ati River =

River in the Tembien highlands of Ethiopia

May Be’ati
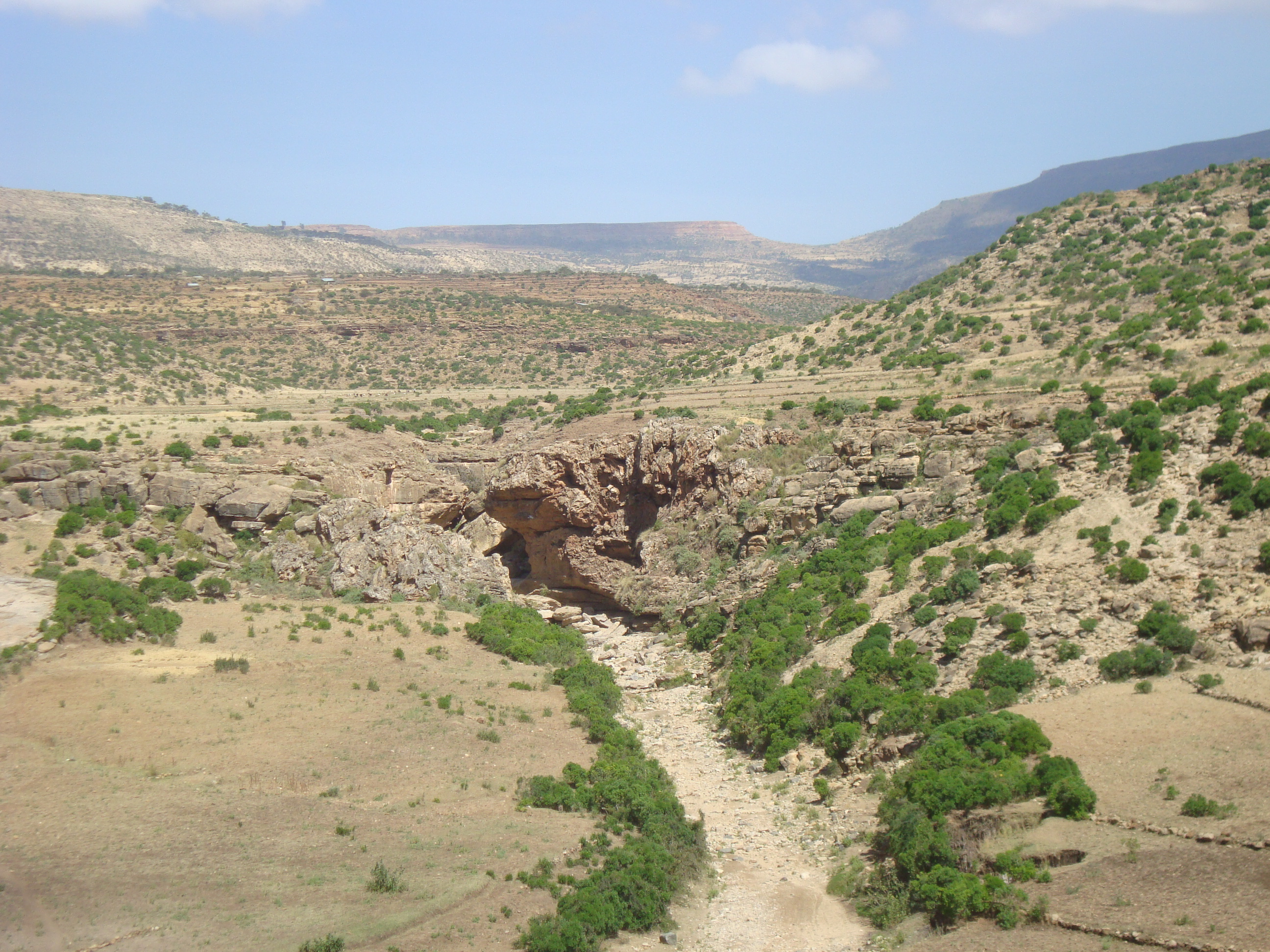
- The May Be’ati River near its confluence with May Zegzeg

- May Be’ati River in Dogu’a Tembien
- Etymology: After the homonymous village

Location
- Country: Ethiopia
- Region: Tigray Region
- District (woreda): Dogu’a Tembien

Physical characteristics
- Source: Gemgema
  - location: Halah in Ayninbirkekin municipality
  - elevation: 2,300 m (7,500 ft)
- 2nd source
  - location: May Be’ati in Ayninbirkekin municipality
- Mouth: May Zegzeg River
  - location: Inda Merue at the border of Mika'el Abiy and Haddinnet municipalities
  - coordinates: 13.614°N 39.226°E
  - elevation: 1,970 m (6,460 ft)
- Length: 7.3 km (4.5 mi)
- Width
  - average: 10 m (33 ft)

Basin features
- Progression: May Zegzeg→ Rubaksa→ Giba→ Tekezé→ Atbarah→ Nile→ Mediterranean Sea
- River system: Seasonal/permanent river
- Waterfalls: Tsigaba
- Bridges: Gemgema footbridge in Halah
- Topography: Mountains and deep gorges

The May Be’ati is a river of the Nile basin. Rising in the mountains of Dogu’a Tembien in northern Ethiopia, it flows southward to empty finally in the Giba and Tekezé River.

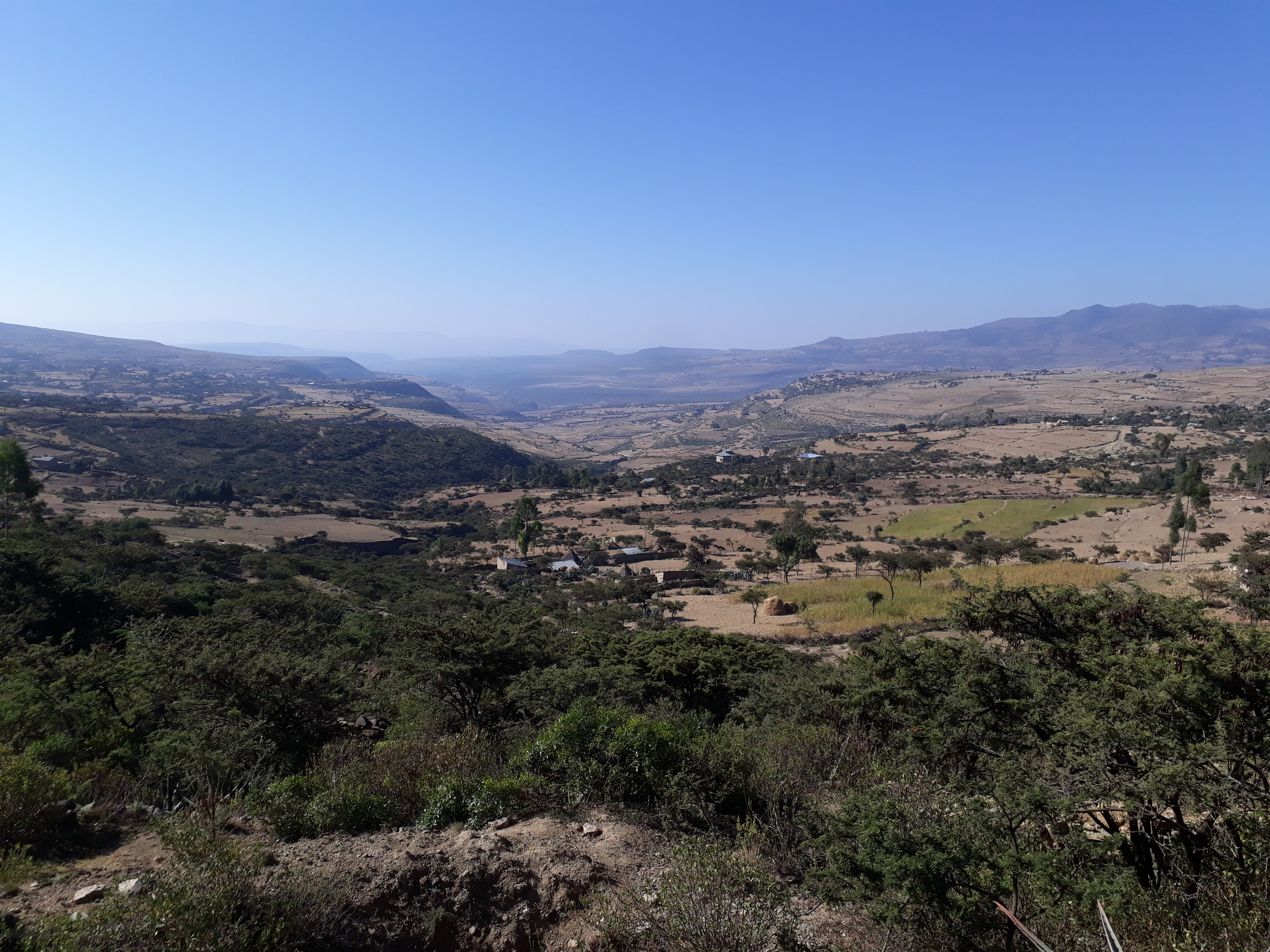
View on May Be’ati catchment – in the forested gorge the river is called Gemgema and in the middle plain it is called Tsigaba

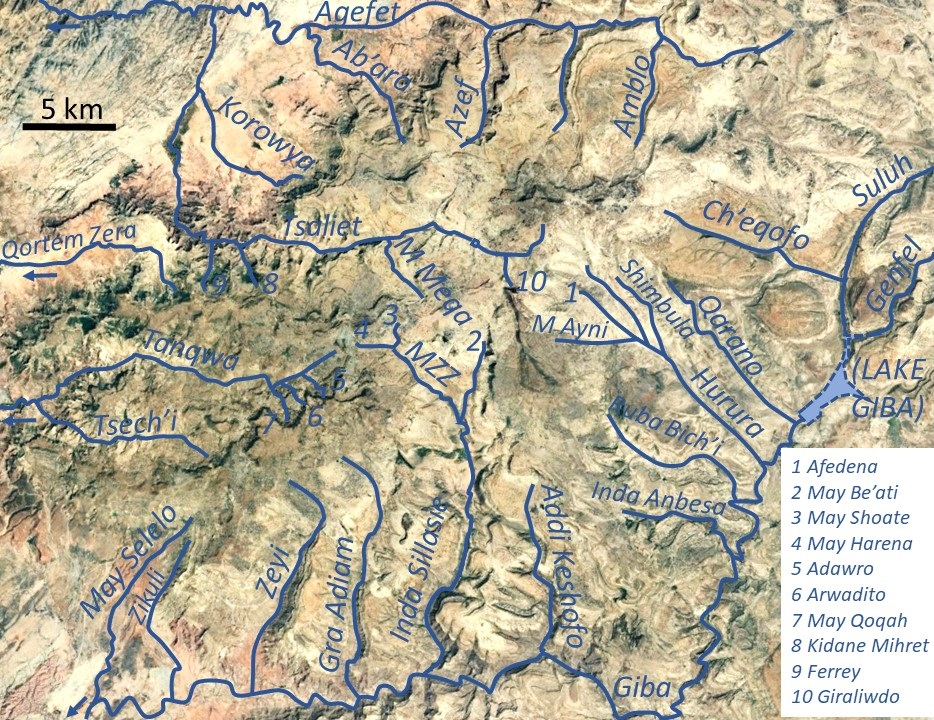
The river in the radial drainage network of Dogu’a Tembien

== Characteristics ==
The May Be’ati is a confined ephemeral river with an average slope gradient of 45 metres per kilometre. With its tributaries, the river has cut a deep gorge.

== Flash floods and flood buffering ==
Runoff mostly happens in the form of high runoff discharge events that occur in a very short period (called flash floods). These are related to the steep topography, often little vegetation cover and intense convective rainfall. The peaks of such flash floods have often a 50 to 100 times larger discharge than the preceding baseflow. The magnitude of floods in this river has however been decreased due to interventions in the catchment. In May Be’ati the effect of such interventions has also been monitored.

=== Physical and biological measures in the catchment ===
At Gemgema, May Be'ati and on other steep slopes, exclosures have been established; the dense vegetation largely contributes to enhanced infiltration, less flooding and better baseflow. Physical conservation structures such as stone bunds and check dams also intercept runoff. In the May Be'ati exclosure, more than 1000 precise measurements were done in 2003 and 2004, using 15 runoff plots, where the volume of runoff was measured daily. The rock type (Antalo Limestone), slope gradient and slope aspect were the same, the only difference was the land management and vegetation density. Whereas in degraded rangeland, 35% of the rainfall flows directly away to the river (runoff coefficient), this happens only for 13.4% of the rain in a recent exclosure and 1.7% in an old exclosure. For sake of comparison, the adjacent May Be'ati church forest has a runoff coefficient of only 0.1%.

=== Check dam construction ===
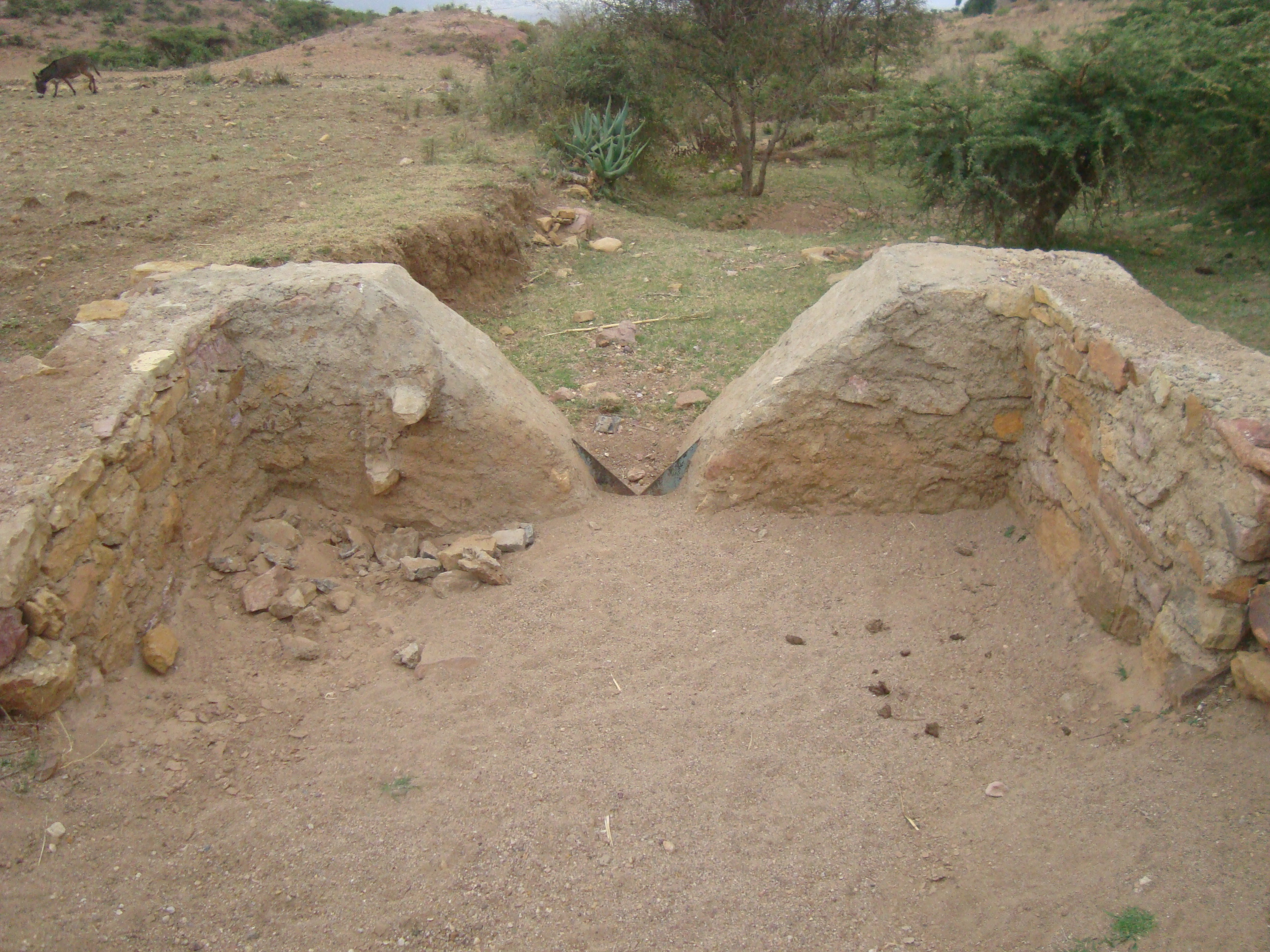
Discharge measurement in upper May Be’ati

The effects of check dams on runoff response have been studied at Addi Qolqwal in the upper catchment of this river, near the road on soils derived from Amba Aradam Sandstone. An increase of hydraulic roughness by check dams and water transmission losses in deposited sediments are responsible for the delay of runoff to reach the lower part of the river channels. The reduction of peak runoff discharge was larger in the torrent with check dams and vegetation (minus 12%) than in that without treatment (minus 5.5%). Reduction of total runoff volume was also larger in the torrent with check dams (minus 18%) than in the untreated torrent (minus 4%). The implementation of check dams combined with vegetation reduced peak flow discharge and total runoff volume as large parts of runoff infiltrated in the sediments deposited behind the check dams. As gully check dams are implemented in a large areas of northern Ethiopia, this contributes to groundwater recharge and increased river baseflow.

=== Check dams and subsurface dams ===
The most common structure to control gullies in this catchment is the check dam. However, there are several problems with collapsing check dams, even if they are built in a correct way, using well-shaped stones and having spillway and apron. One problem is in the Vertisol areas, such as near May Be’ati village in the upper catchment: sometimes the check dam stands intact and the water creates a new gully around it. The reasons are the cracks occurring in Vertisols: the water that accumulates behind the dam will start flowing through the cracks; it will round the dam and create an underground tunnel that becomes wider and wider until collapse. To control this, simple and cheap subsurface dams were implemented around 2010. Trenches, 2.5 meter deep and 25 meter long, were excavated at both sides of a check dams and a heavy plastic sheet (geomembrane) inserted vertically, after which the trench was filled with soil. The plastic sheet prevents water from flowing underground through the cracks. No more bypass occurs, and the water table is raised.

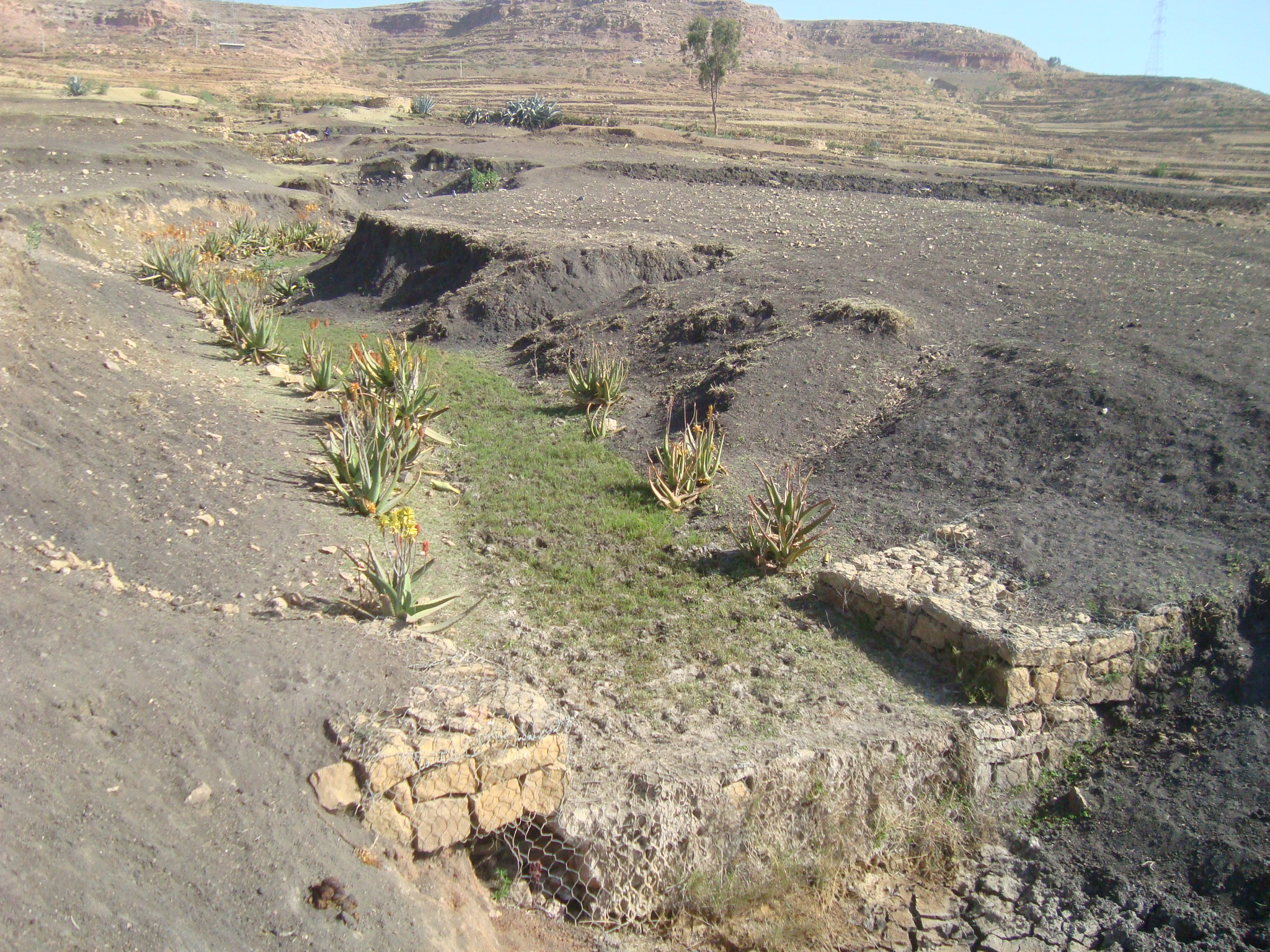
Check dam in the May Be’ati headwaters – towards left and right a geomembrane has been insterted, what leads to an increase of the water table, hence the greenness in the gully bottom

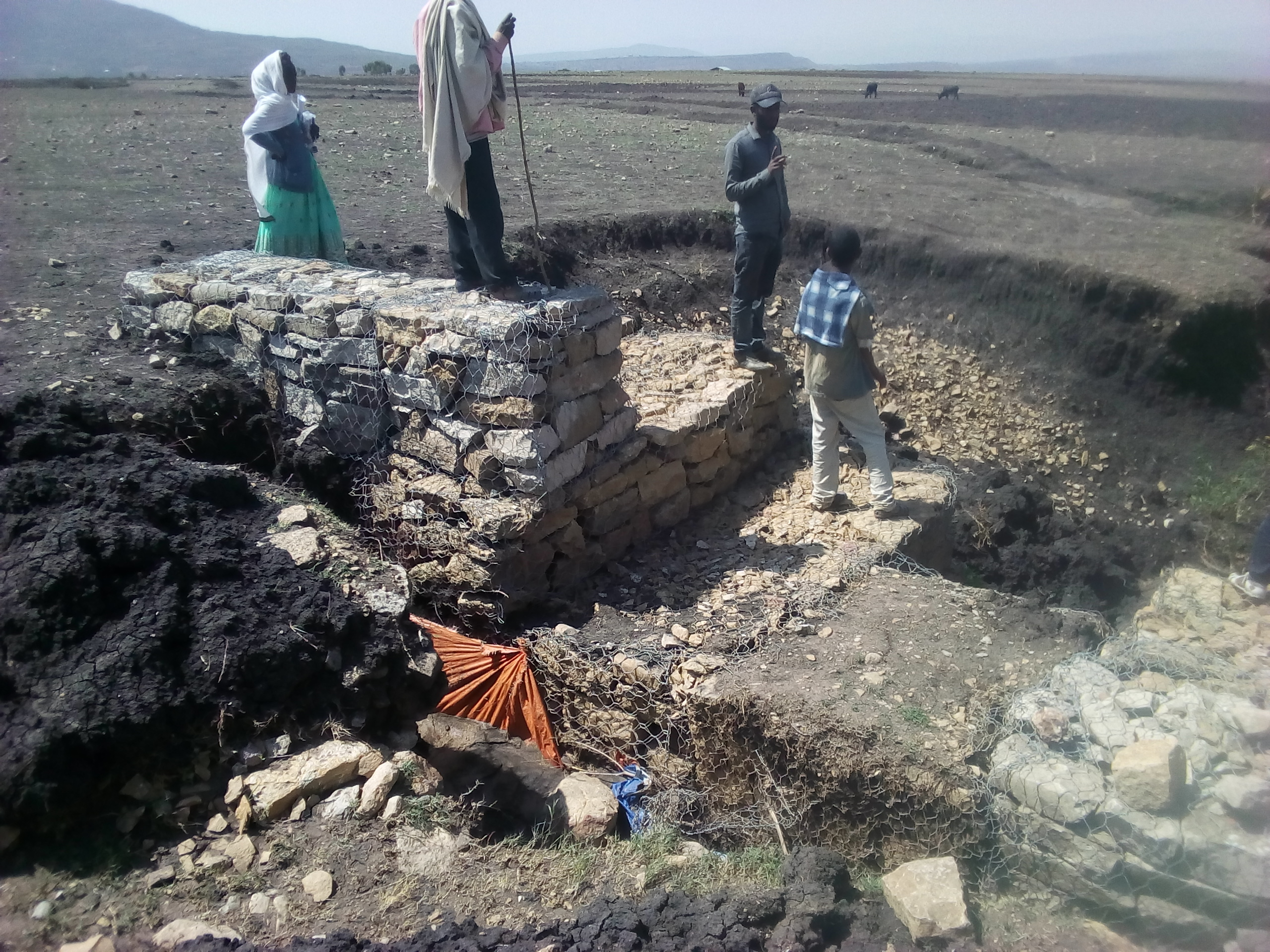
Check dam with subsurface dam

=== Spate irrigation on exclosures ===
The effectiveness of exclosures could be enhanced by supplementing additional water to the short and erratic rain. The effects of such spate irrigation on species diversity, stocking and ring width growth of trees was evaluated in two exclosures (Addi Qolqwal and May Be'ati) in the catchment of May Be’ati River. The runoff diversion from the gully channel towards the regenerating forest was done with trenches dug at different locations to enhance an even runoff water distribution over the exclosures. The exclosure in May Be’ati was irrigated in 2005 while the Addi Qolqwal exclosure was irrigated from 2012 onwards but monitored from 2014 to 2016. The volume of irrigation water (from surface runoff) applied is of the same order of magnitude as the direct rainfall on the site. Trees in the irrigated exclosure have greater species diversity and show better growth. Particularly during the peak rainy season when there is excess water in Dogu’a Tembien, that cannot be used for crop irrigation, spate irrigation towards woody vegetation can be an important buffer for peak runoff discharges and if largely applied, it can reduce floods in the downstream areas.

== Boulders and pebbles in the river bed ==
Boulders and pebbles encountered in the river bed can originate from any location higher up in the catchment. In the uppermost stretches of the river, only rock fragments of the upper lithological units will be present in the river bed, whereas more downstream one may find a more comprehensive mix of all lithologies crossed by the river. From upstream to downstream, the following lithological units occur in the catchment.

- Upper basalt
- Interbedded lacustrine deposits
- Lower basalt
- Amba Aradam Formation
- Antalo Limestone
- Quaternary freshwater tufa

== Trekking along the river ==
Trekking routes have been established across and along this river. The tracks are not marked on the ground but can be followed using downloaded .GPX files. Trek routes 13 and 13V cross the river and its catchment.

== See also ==
- List of Ethiopian rivers
