= Inda Sillasie River =

River in the Tigray highlands of Ethiopia

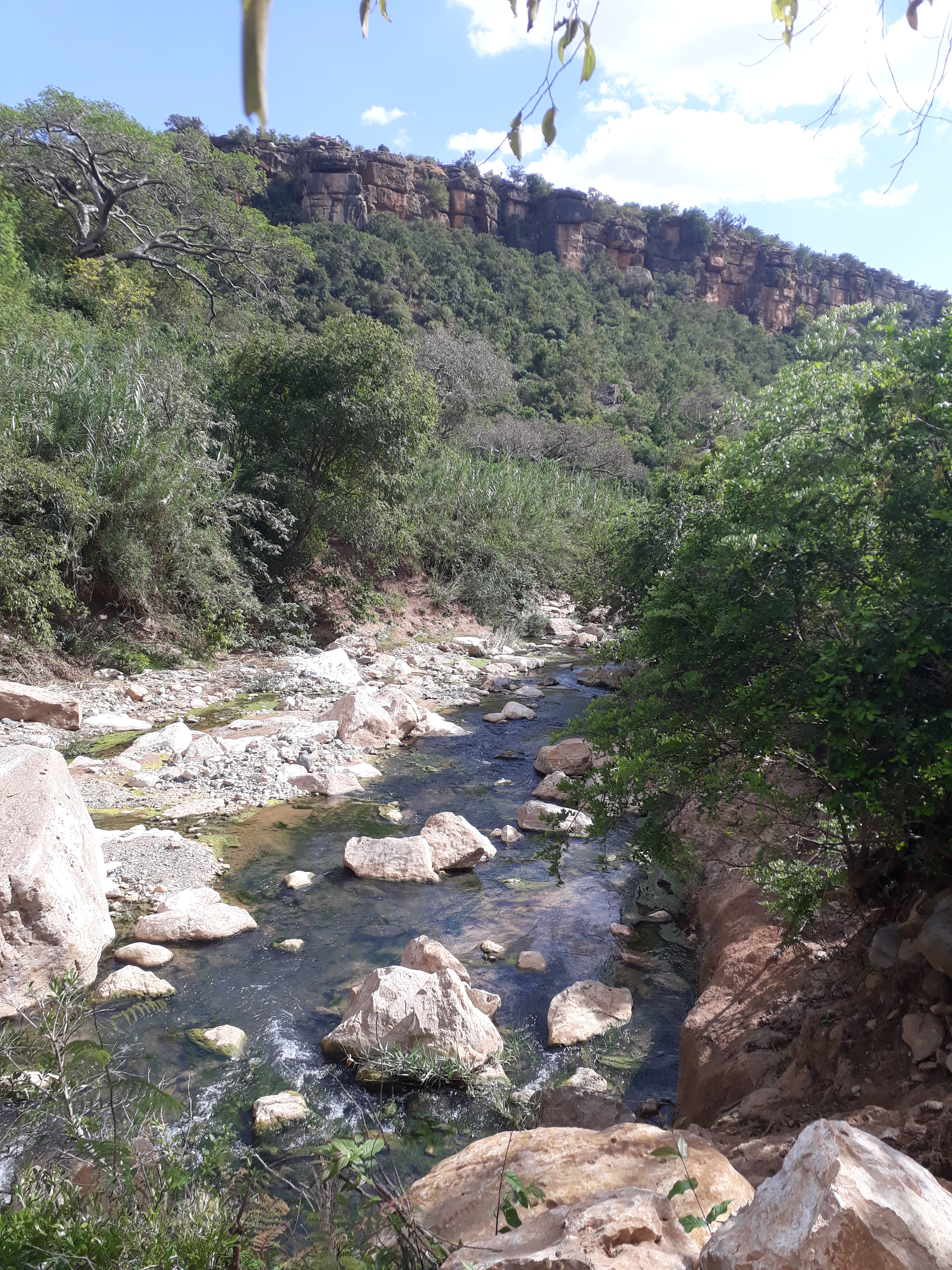
- The Inda Sillasie River at Dabba Hadera

- Inda Sillasie River in Tigray Region

Location
- Country: Ethiopia
- Region: Tigray Region
- Districts (woreda): Dogu’a Tembien, xxx

Physical characteristics
- Source: May Zegzeg River
  - elevation: 1,970 m (6,460 ft)
- 2nd source: May Be'ati River
- Mouth: Giba River
  - location: Down from Addi Lihtsi in Amanit municipality
  - coordinates: 13.491°N 39.21°E
  - elevation: 1,470 m (4,820 ft)
- Length: 19 km (12 mi)
- Basin size: 121 km^{2} (47 mi^{2})
- Width
  - average: 18 m (59 ft)
- Discharge
  - location: At the outlet, near Inda Sillasie monastery
  - maximum: 172 m^{3}/s (6,100 cu ft/s)

Basin features
- Progression: Giba→ Tekezé→ Atbarah→ Nile→ Mediterranean Sea
- River system: Permanent river
- Landmarks: Rubaksa; Dabba Hadera and Inda Sillasie monasteries
- Waterfalls: Rapids
- Bridges: Footbridge at Rubaksa
- Topography: Mountains and deep gorges

The Inda Sillasie is a river of northern Ethiopia. It originates at the confluence of May Zegzeg and May Be'ati Rivers in the mountains of Dogu’a Tembien (1970 metres above sea level), and flows southward to Giba River which empties finally in the Tekezé River. Along its course, it first takes the name Rubaksa River, then Dabba Hadera River, and finally Inda Sillasie River.

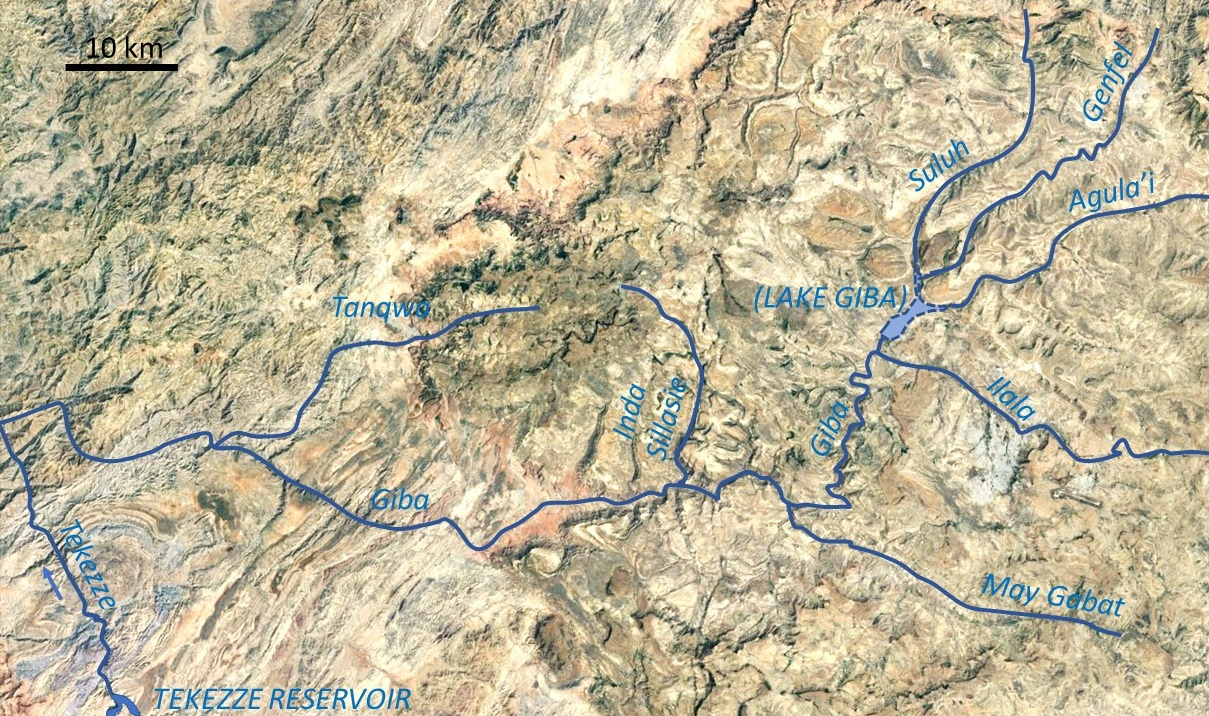
Giba drainage network

== Hydrography ==
It is a confined river, locally meandering in its narrow alluvial plain, with a slope gradient of 26 metres per kilometre. With its tributaries, the river has cut a deep gorge.

=== Tributaries ===
Main tributaries are

- May Zegzeg
  - May Harena
  - May Sho'ate
- May Be'ati River

== Hydrology ==
=== Hydrological characteristics ===
The runoff footprint or annual total runoff volume is 13 million m³. Peak discharges up to 172 m³ per second occur in the second part of the rainy season (month of August) when there are strong rains and the soils are saturated with water in many places. The percentage of total rainfall that directly leaves the catchment as storm runoff (also called runoff coefficient) is 9%. As limestone is present in 28% of the catchment this runoff coefficient is less than that of adjacent rivers. The total amount of sediment that is transported by this river amounts to 59,200 tonnes per year. Median sediment concentration in the river water is 1.57 grammes per litre, but may go up to 106 g/L. The highest sediment concentrations occur at the beginning of the rainy season, when loose soil and dust is washed away by overland flow and ends up in the river. As such water contains many nutrients (locally it is called "aygi"), farmers estimate that it strengthens their cattle, which they will bring to the river. All in all, average sediment yield is 733 tonnes per km^{2} and per year. All measurements were done at a purposively installed station near the mouth of the river, in the year 2006.

=== Flash floods ===
Runoff mostly occurs in the form of high runoff discharge events that occur in a very short period (called flash floods). These are related to the steep topography, often little vegetation cover and intense convective rainfall. The peaks of such flash floods have often a 50 to 100 times larger discharge than the preceding baseflow. These flash floods mostly occur during the evening or night, because the convective rain showers occur in the afternoon.

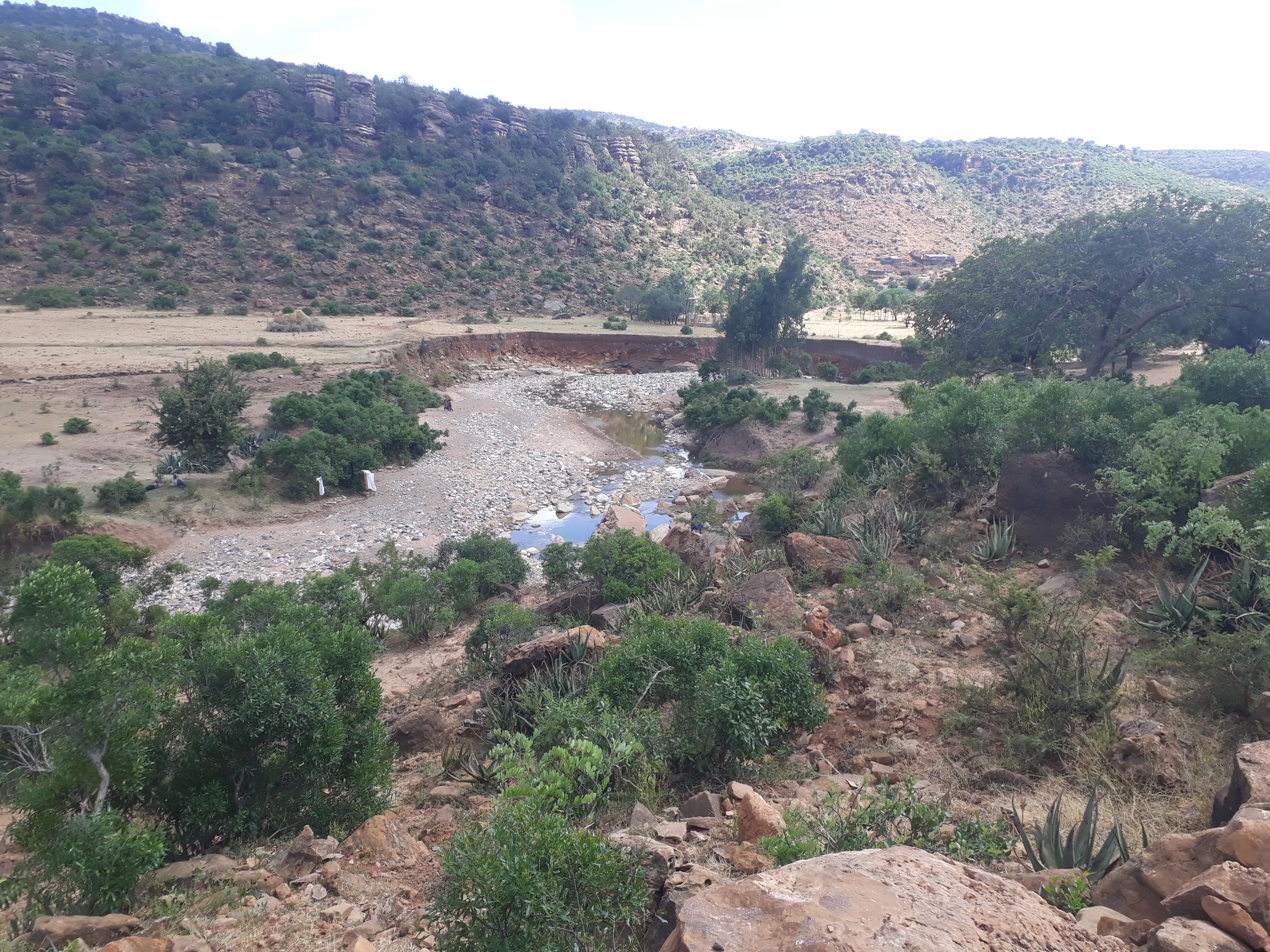
Middle course of the river

=== Changes over time ===
Evidence given by Italian aerial photographs of the catchment, taken in the 1930s show that 55% of the catchment was covered with woody vegetation (against 35% in 2014). Up to the 1980s, there was strong pressure on the environment, and much vegetation disappeared. This river had its greatest discharges and width in that period. The magnitude of floods in this river has however been decreased in recent years due to interventions in the catchment. At Addi Meles, Kidmi Gestet, May Hib'o, Gemgema, May Be'ati and on other steep slopes, exclosures have been established; the dense vegetation largely contributes to enhanced infiltration, less flooding and better baseflow. Physical conservation structures such as stone bunds and check dams also intercept runoff.

== May Zegzeg Integrated Catchment Management Project ==
As part of outreach accompanying research in Dogu'a Tembien, the May Zegzeg Integrated Catchment Management Project was set up in 2004 in the catchment of the May Zegzeg River by researchers in cooperation with ADCS, a local NGO. The project included the implementation of conservation techniques to increase water infiltration and conserve the soil. The objective of the second phase of this project was to improve the livelihood of the communities of the Inda Sillasie catchment, as well as to demonstrate and promote global catchment management in the district. The results of the implementation of site-specific conservation techniques aimed at increasing water infiltration and conserving soil were particularly monitored in the headwaters at May Sho'ate: dry masonry stone bunds, check dams in gullies, and the set-aside of degraded rangelands which resulted in exclosures.

== Irrigated agriculture ==
Besides springs and reservoirs, irrigation is strongly dependent on the river's baseflow. Such irrigated agriculture is important in meeting the demands for food security and poverty reduction. Irrigated lands are established in the narrow alluvial plains along the river in Rubaksa, and additional gardens have been installed in the lower gorge through the May Zegzeg project.

== Remarkable springs along the river ==
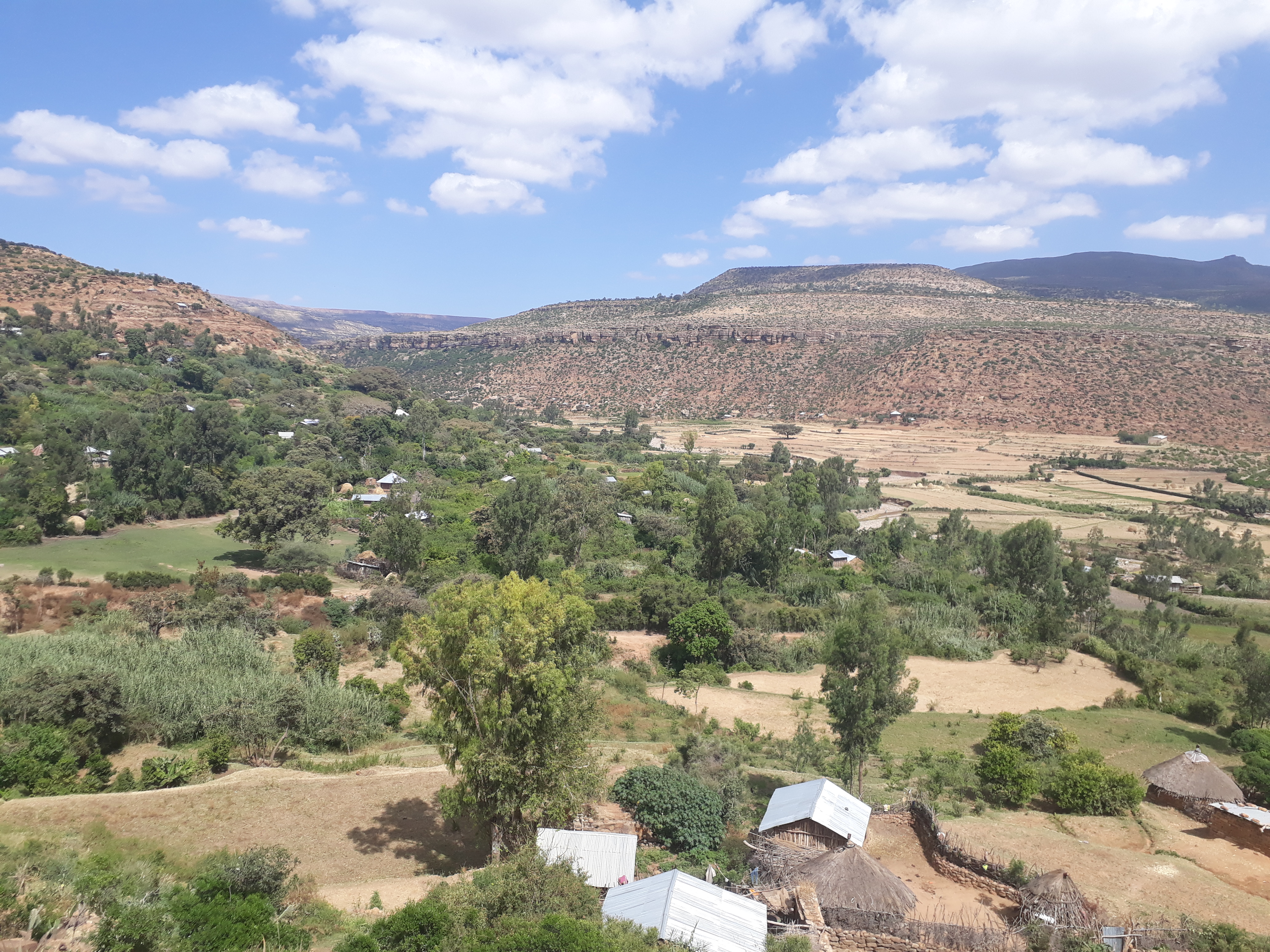
Rubaksa gardens, irrigated with water from a karstic resurgence

There are three large karstic resurgences in the Antalo Limestone along this river:

- Rubaksa, spring water mainly used as irrigation water
- Dabba Hadera monastery, pilgrim destination
- Inda Sillasie monastery and "holy water"

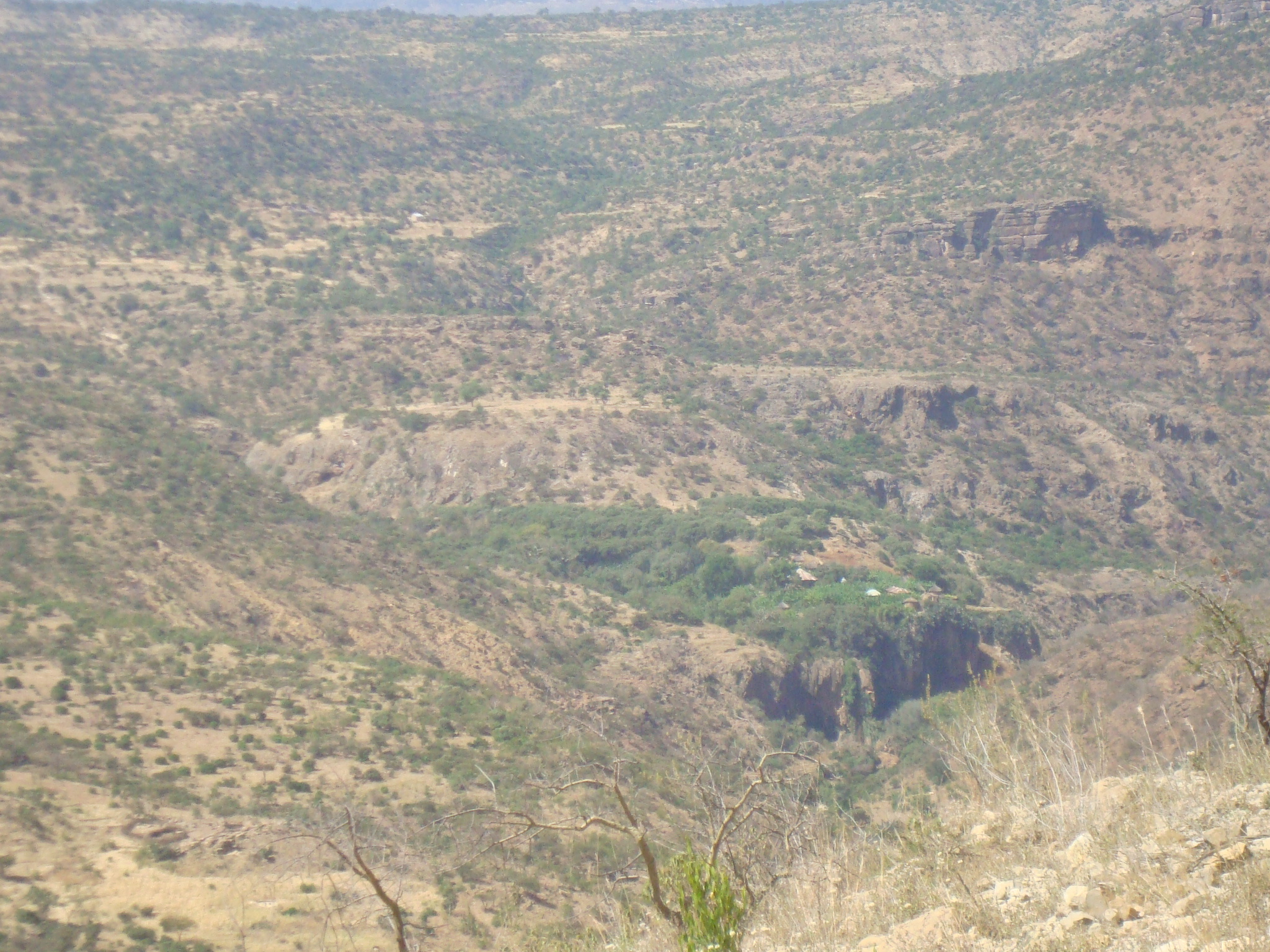
Inda Sillasie monastery along the homonymous gorge

== Transhumance towards the river gorge ==
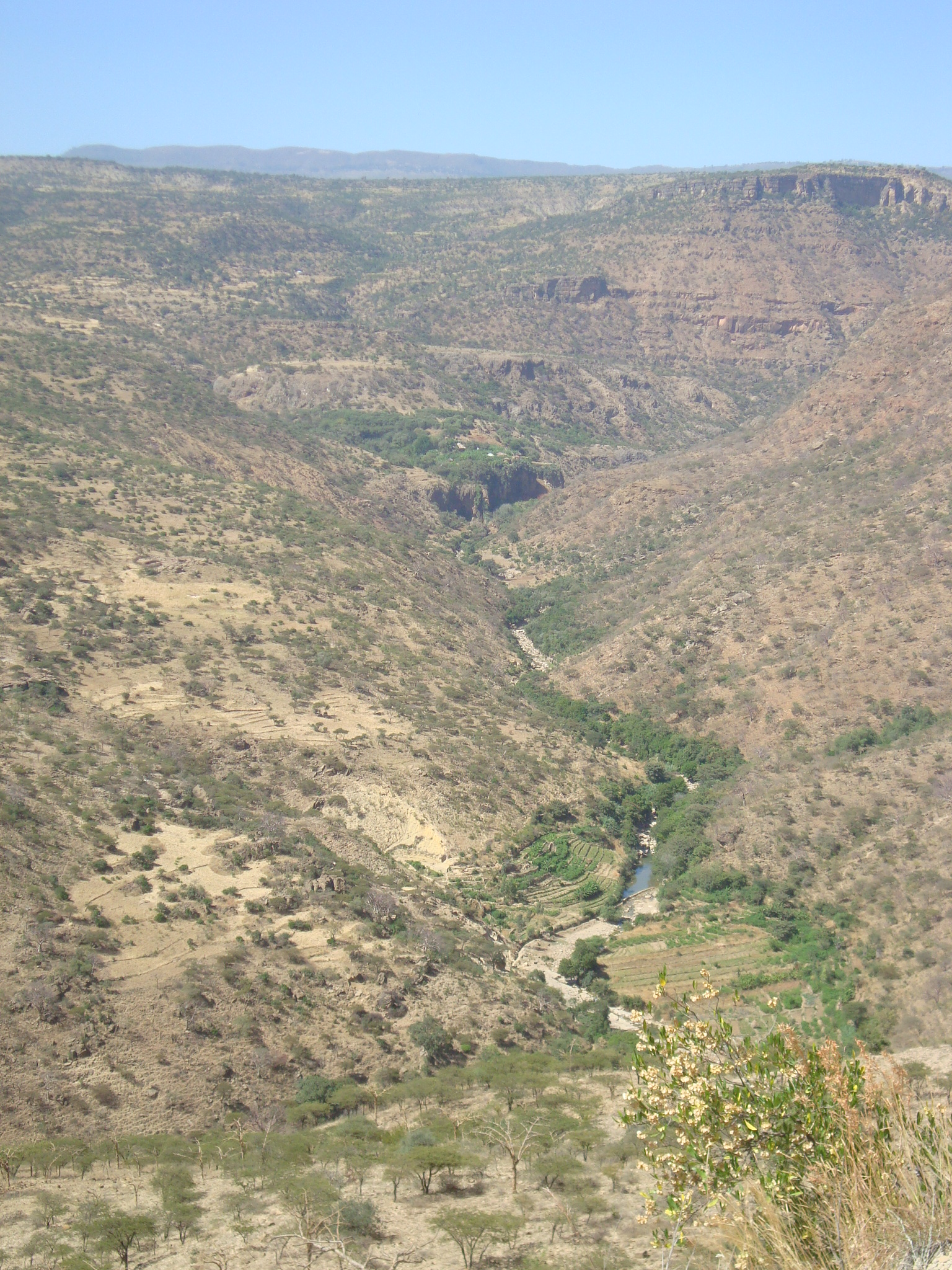
Inda Sillasie gorge with partial view on irrigated lands established by the May Zegzeg project

Valley bottoms in the gorges of this river have been identified as a transhumance destination zone. Transhumance takes place in the summer rainy season, when the lands near the villages are occupied by crops. Young shepherds will take the village cattle down to the gorge and overnight in small caves. The gorges are particularly attractive as a transhumance destination zone, because there is water and good growth of semi-natural vegetation.

== Boulders and pebbles in the river bed ==
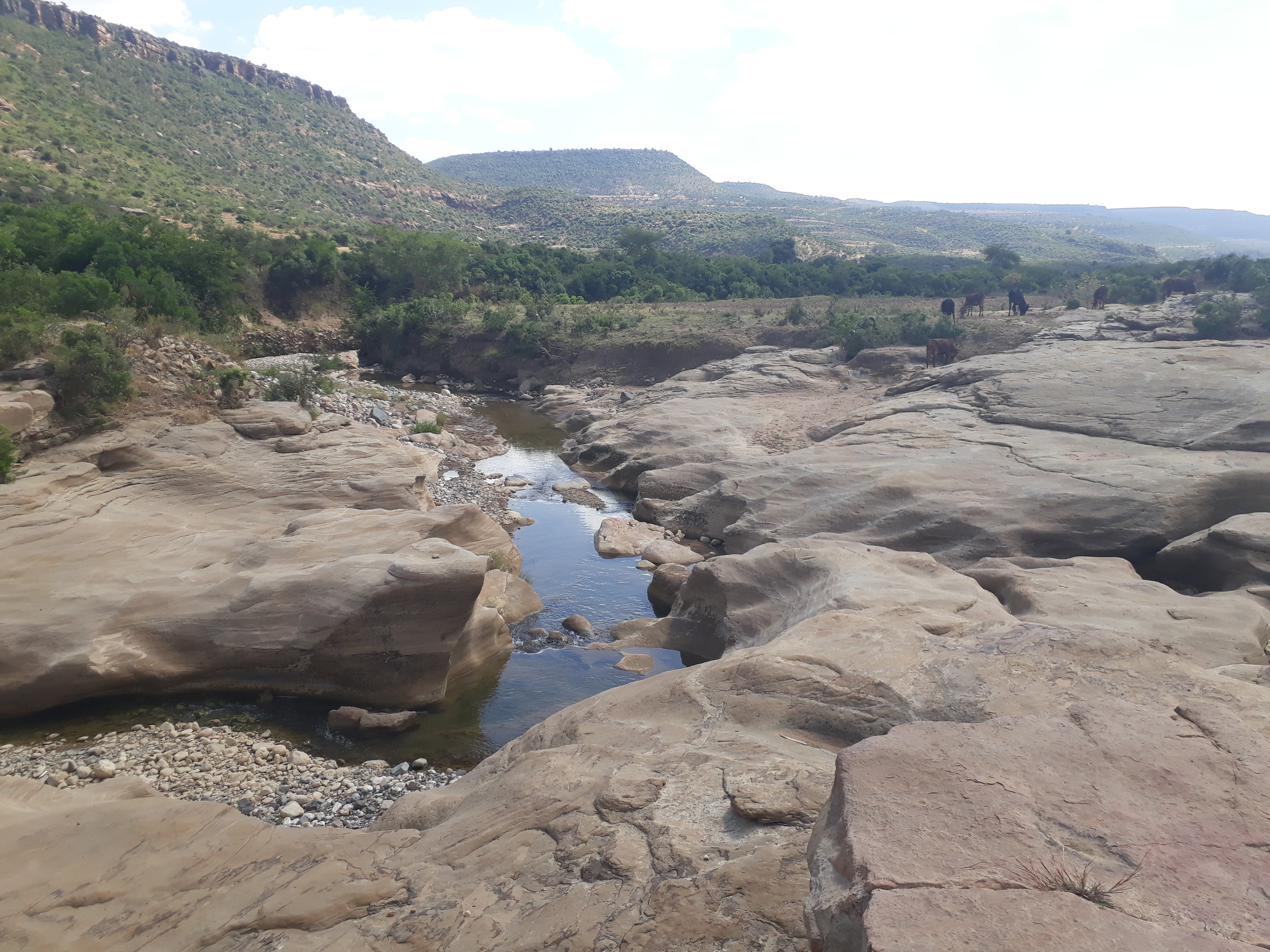
Antalo Limestone outcrop in the Rubaksa rapids

Boulders and pebbles encountered in the river bed can originate from any location higher up in the catchment. In the uppermost stretches of the river, only rock fragments of the upper lithological units will be present in the river bed, whereas more downstream one may find a more comprehensive mix of all lithologies crossed by the river. From upstream to downstream, the following lithological units occur in the catchment.

- Phonolite plugs
- Upper basalt
- Interbedded lacustrine deposits
- Lower basalt
- Amba Aradam Formation
- Antalo Limestone

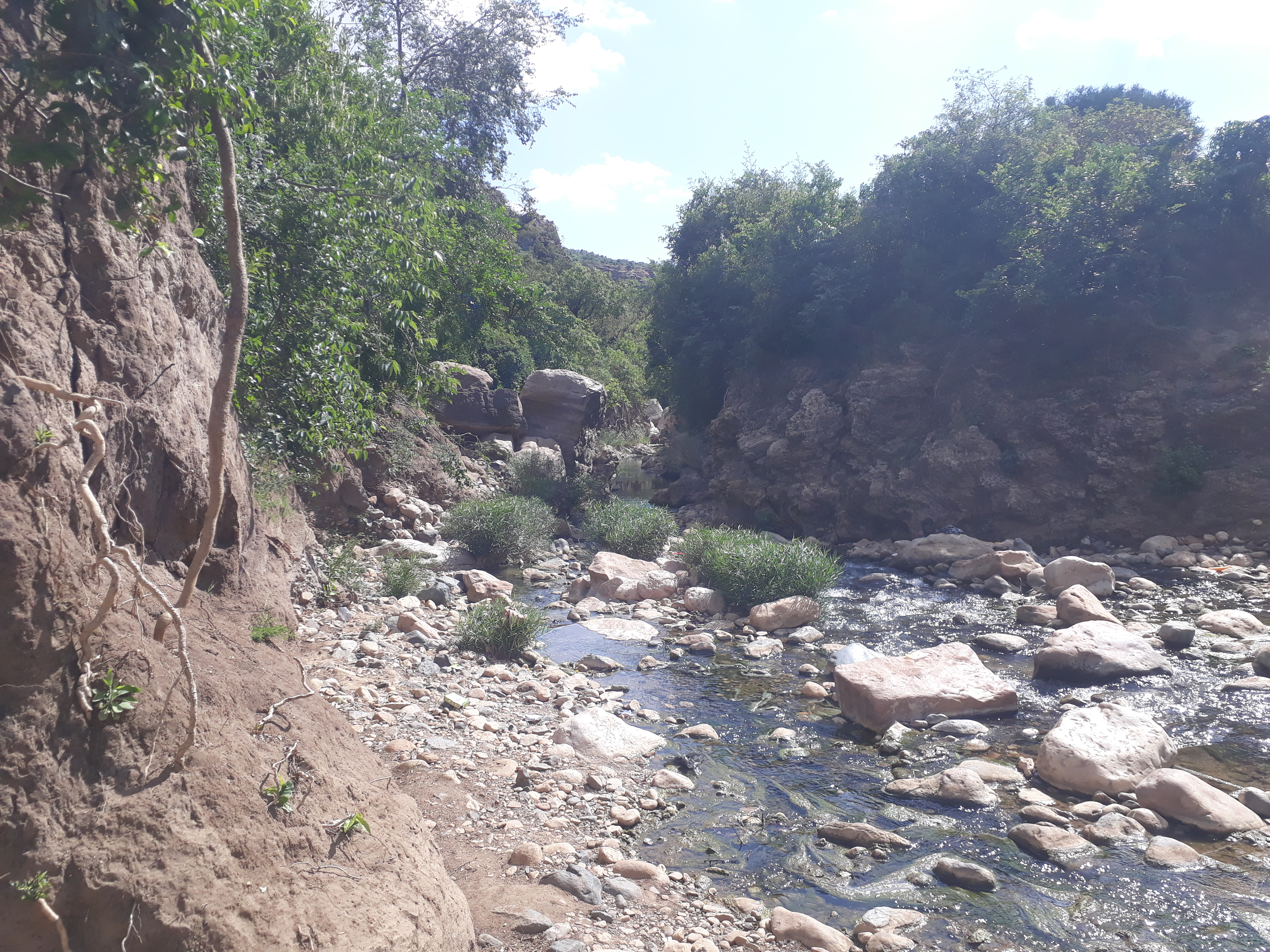
Tufa deposit in the river bed, downstream from Dabba Hadera

- Quaternary freshwater tufa
- Adigrat Sandstone

== Natural boundary ==
During its course, this river passes through three municipalities: Mika'el Abiy, Inda Sillasie and Amanit. Over most of its length, it constitutes the border between the latter two.

== Trekking along the river ==
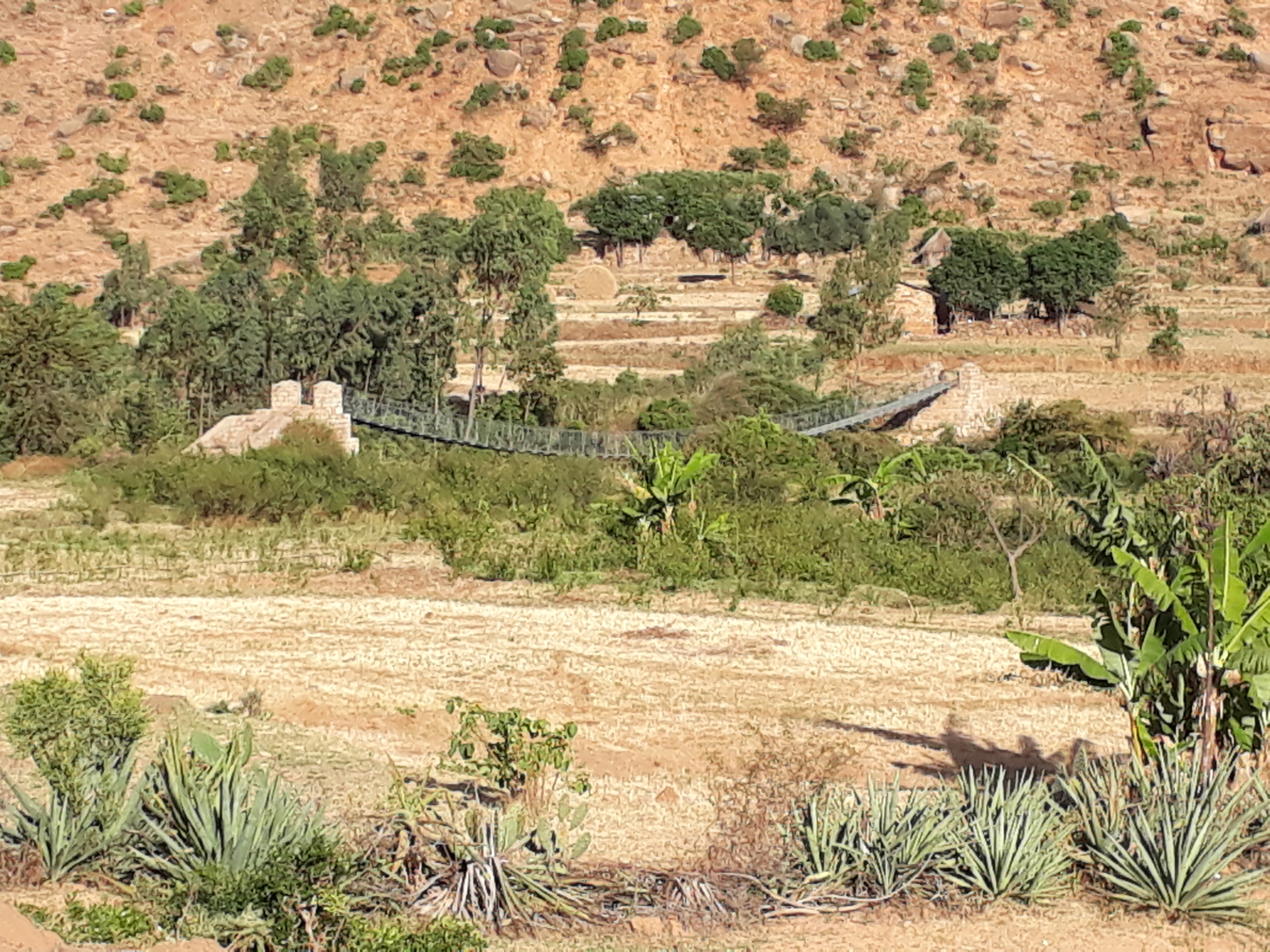
Rubaksa footbridge

Trekking routes have been established across and along this river. The tracks are not marked on the ground but can be followed using downloaded .GPX files.

- Trek 10, along the middle and lower course of the river
- Trek 12, along the upper course of the river
- Trek 16, across the river in Rubaksa village

In the rainy season, flash floods may occur and it is advised not to follow the river bed. Frequently, it is then also impossible to wade across the river.

== See also ==
- List of Ethiopian rivers
