= May Sho'ate =

River in the Tembien highlands of Ethiopia

May Sho’ate Argak'a
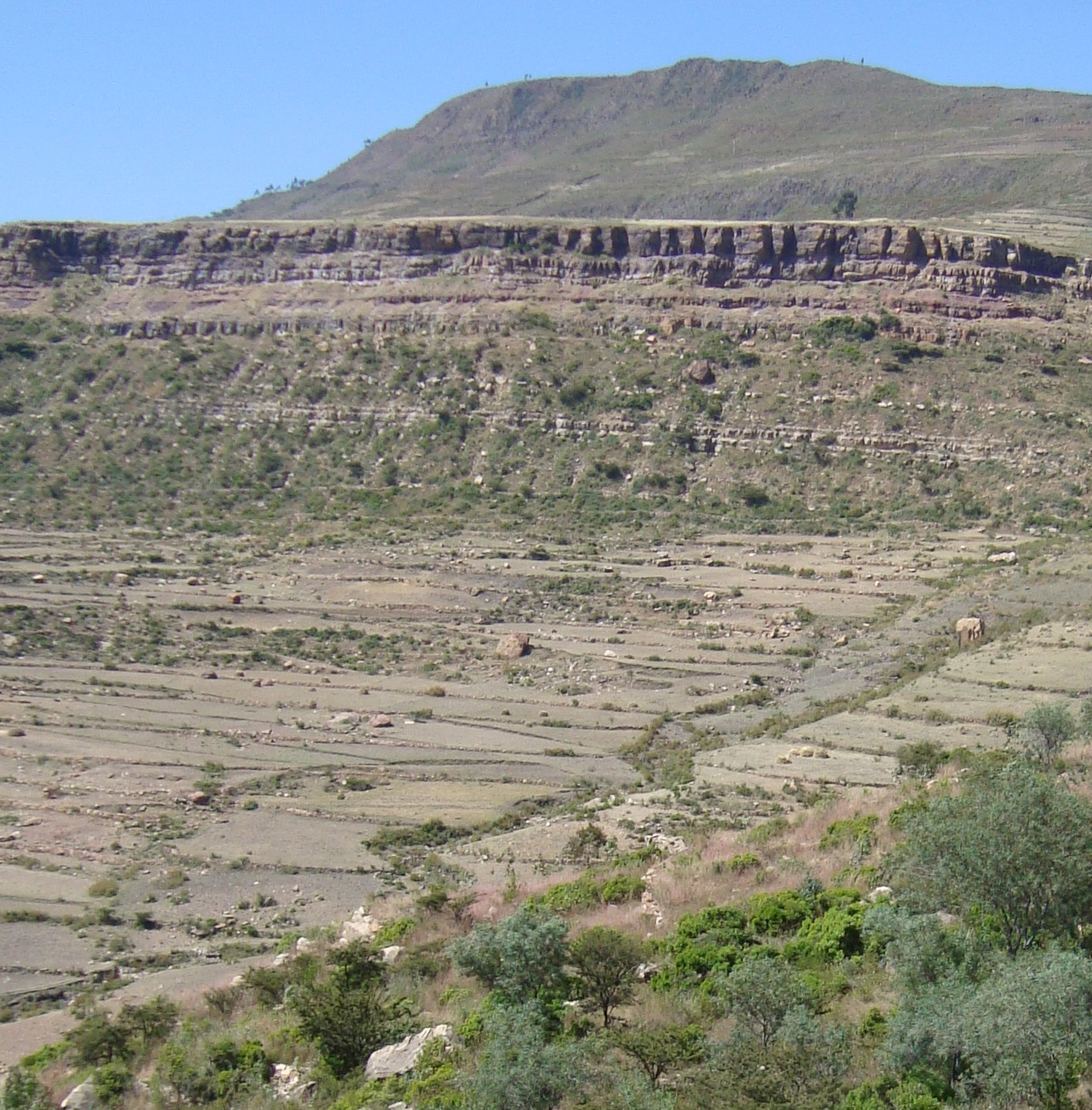
- The May Sho’ate River in its catchment

- May Sho’ate River in Dogu’a Tembien

Location
- Country: Ethiopia
- Region: Tigray Region
- District (woreda): Dogu’a Tembien

Physical characteristics
- Source: May Ntebteb
  - location: Zenaqo in Ayninbirkekin municipality
  - elevation: 2,500 m (8,200 ft)
- Mouth: May Zegzeg River
  - location: May Addi Abagie, at the border of Mika'el Abiy and Haddinnet municipalities
  - coordinates: 13.644°N 39.194°E
  - elevation: 2,270 m (7,450 ft)
- Length: 1.9 km (1.2 mi)
- Width
  - average: 5 m (16 ft)

Basin features
- Progression: May Zegzeg→ Rubaksa→ Giba→ Tekezé→ Atbarah→ Nile→ Mediterranean Sea
- River system: Seasonal/permanent river
- Landmarks: Ilias’ Stone
- Waterfalls: May Ntebteb
- Topography: Mountains and deep gorges

The May Sho’ate (also called Argak'a) is a river of the Nile basin. Rising in the mountains of Dogu’a Tembien in northern Ethiopia, it flows southward to empty finally in Giba and Tekezé River.

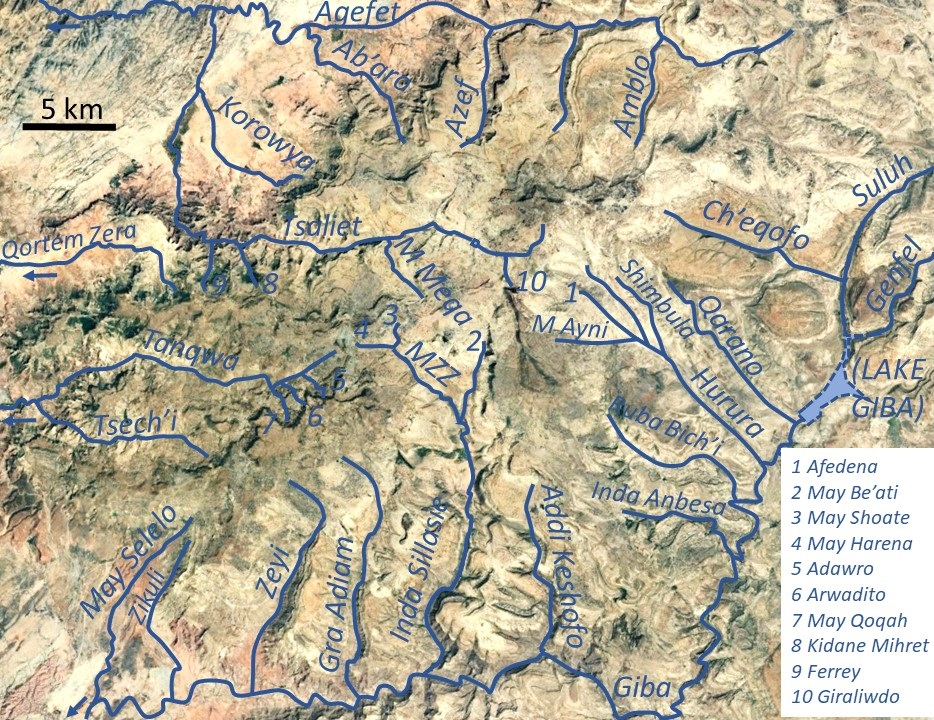
The river in the radial drainage network of Dogu’a Tembien

== Characteristics ==
It is a confined ephemeral river with an average slope gradient of 121 metres per kilometre. With its tributaries, the river has cut a deep gorge.

== May Zegzeg Integrated Catchment Management Project ==
As part of outreach accompanying research in Dogu'a Tembien, the May Zegzeg Integrated Catchment Management Project was set up in 2004 in the catchment of the May Zegzeg River by researchers in cooperation with ADCS, a local NGO. There was a particular focus on the May Sho’ate subcatchment. The project included the implementation of conservation techniques to increase water infiltration and conserve the soil. The objective was to improve the livelihood of the communities of Harena, Hech'i and Addi Qolqwal as well as to demonstrate and promote global catchment management in the district. The results of the implementation of site-specific conservation techniques aimed at increasing water infiltration and conserving soil were particularly monitored in the headwaters at May Sho'ate: dry masonry stone bunds, check dams in gullies, and the set-aside of degraded rangelands which resulted in exclosures.

== Flash floods and flood buffering ==
Runoff mostly happens in the form of high runoff discharge events that occur in a very short period (called flash floods). These are related to the steep topography, often little vegetation cover and intense convective rainfall. The peaks of such flash floods have often a 50 to 100 times larger discharge than the preceding baseflow.

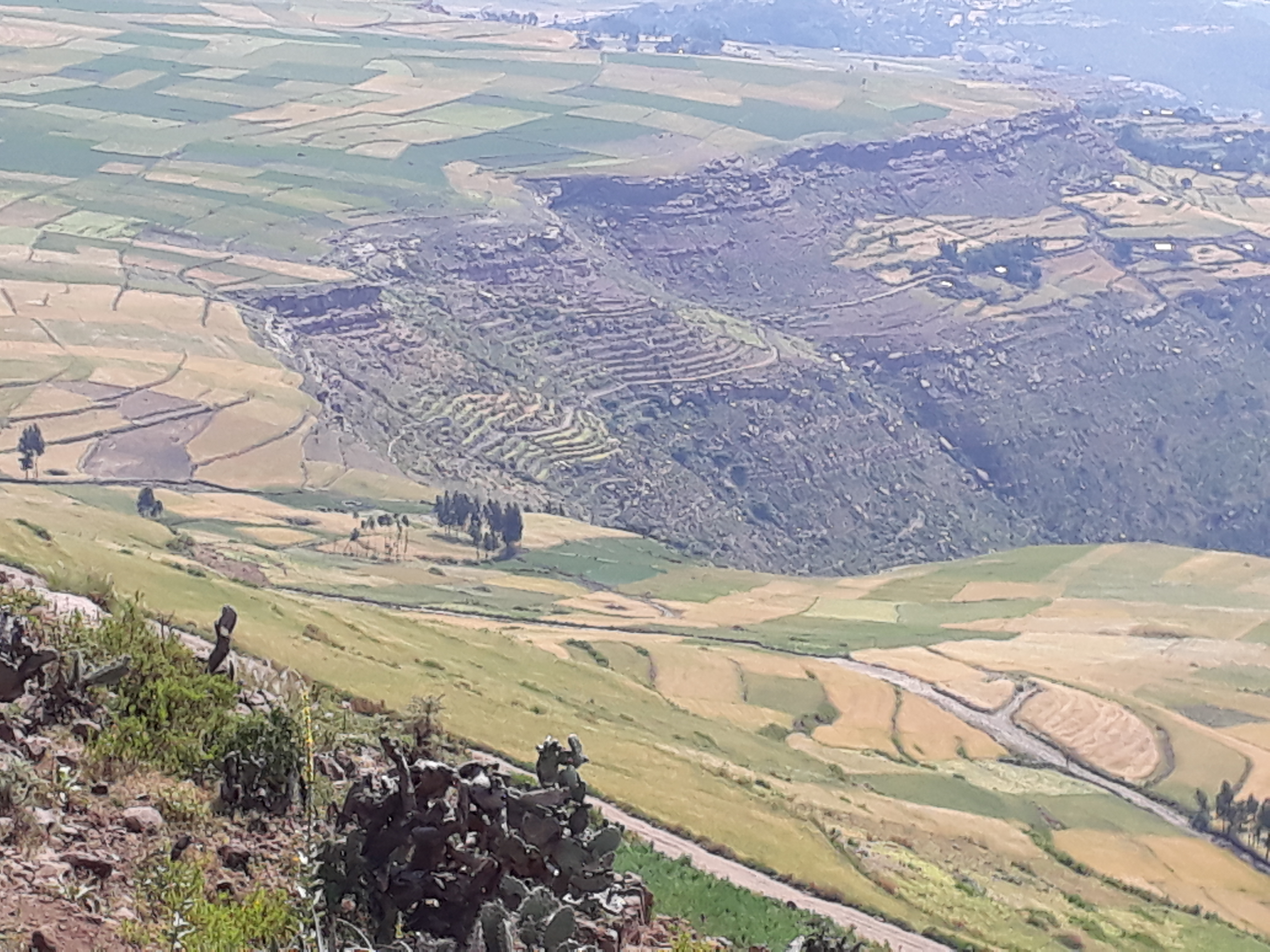
May Sho’ate catchment

The magnitude of floods in this river has however been decreased due to interventions in the catchment by the May Zegzeg project, and other community activities. On the steep slopes, exclosures have been established; the dense vegetation largely contributes to enhanced infiltration, less flooding and better baseflow. Physical conservation structures such as stone bunds and check dams also intercept runoff.

== Irrigated agriculture ==
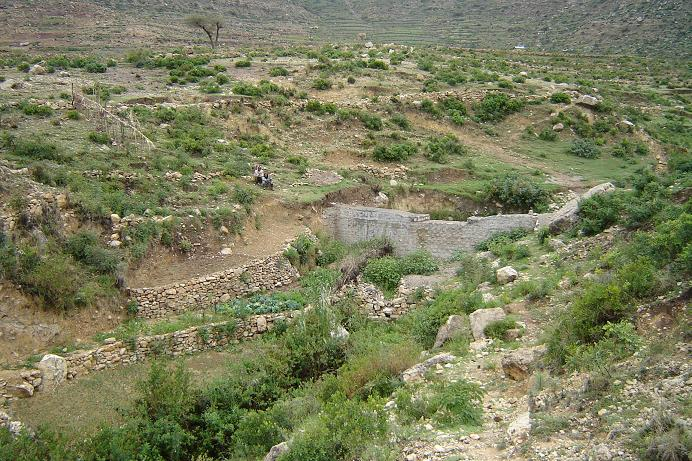
May Sho’ate dam

Besides springs and reservoirs, irrigation is strongly dependent on the river's baseflow. Such irrigated agriculture is important in meeting the demands for food security and poverty reduction. Irrigated lands near springs that became strong after conservation activities:

- Zenaqo in the upper catchment
- May Addi Abagiè, near the confluence of May Sho’ate and May Harena

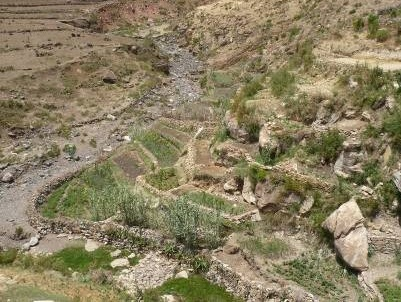
Irrigation near the confluence of May Sho’ate and May Harena

== Boulders and pebbles in the river bed ==
Boulders and pebbles encountered in the river bed can originate from any location higher up in the catchment. In the uppermost stretches of the river, only rock fragments of the upper lithological units will be present in the river bed, whereas more downstream one may find a more comprehensive mix of all lithologies crossed by the river. From upstream to downstream, the following lithological units occur in the catchment.

- Upper basalt
- Interbedded lacustrine deposits
- Lower basalt
- Amba Aradam Formation
- Antalo Limestone

== Research catchment ==
Given its representativeness for the wider northern Ethiopian Highlands and the proximity to Hagere Selam town, various research undertakings took place along May Sho’ate and in its catchment. These studies were particularly related to:

- Contribution of tillage erosion to landscape formation (monitoring study)
- Removal of rock fragments and its effect on soil loss and crop yield (study on experimental plots)
- Remobilisation of ancient mass movements (the May Ntebteb landslide)
- Impact of road building on gully erosion risk
- Causes of high stone cover in farm fields
- Effectiveness of loose rock check dams for gully control (monitoring study)
- Effectiveness of stone bunds in controlling soil erosion (monitoring studies)
- Rainfall erosivity and variability (based on rain data collection)
- Impacts of soil conservation on soil fertility and crop yield (monitoring study)
- Rockfall from the cliffs in the catchment and rock fragment displacement on scree slopes (monitoring study)
- Soil mapping
- River sediment budget before and after land conservation
- Groundwater recharge monitoring
- Conservation agriculture (studies on experimental plots and in farmers fields)
- Land use and soil erosion rates (study on experimental plots)
- Water balance (monitoring study)
- Rodents harbouring in loose rock conservation structures

== Natural boundary ==
During its course, this river constitutes the borders between Ayninbirkekin and Mika'el Abiy municipalities|.

== Trekking along the river ==
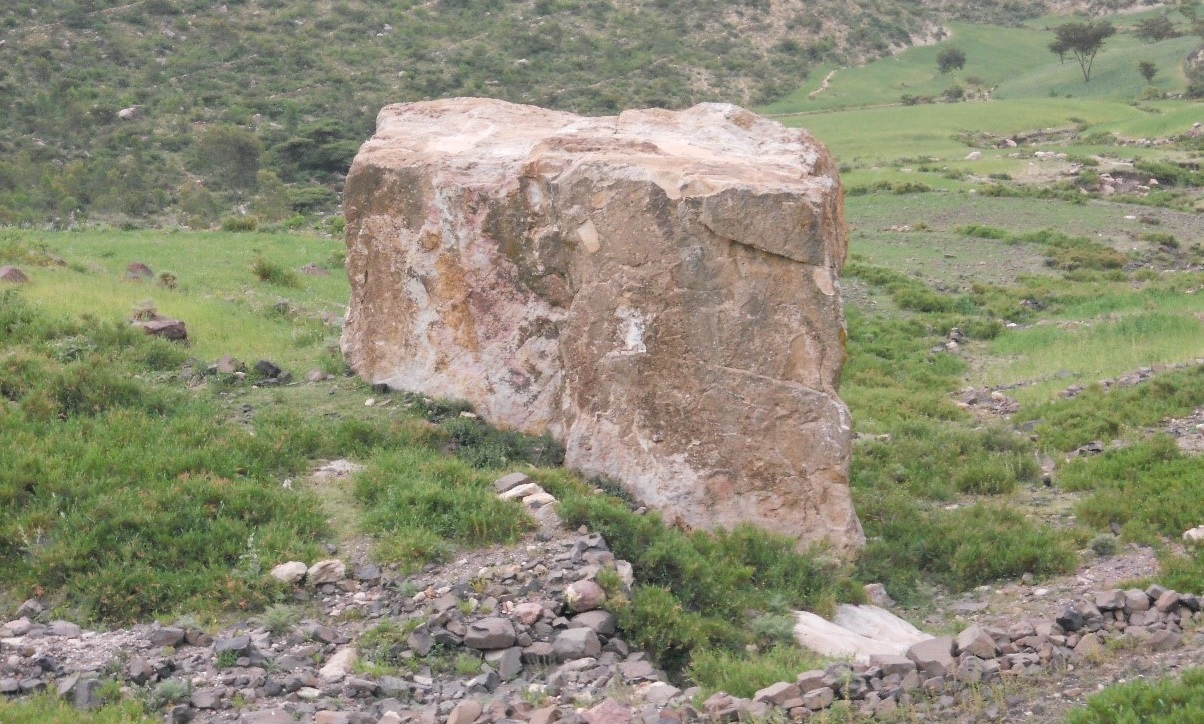
Ilias’ stone along May Sho’ate river bed

Trekking routes have been established across and along this river. The tracks are not marked on the ground but can be followed using downloaded .GPX files.

- Trek 12, across the river and its upper catchment near Addi Qolqwal village
- Trek 12V, across the river and its lower catchment near Hech'i and Harena villages

== See also ==
- List of Ethiopian rivers
