= May Zegzeg =

River in the Tembien highlands of Ethiopia

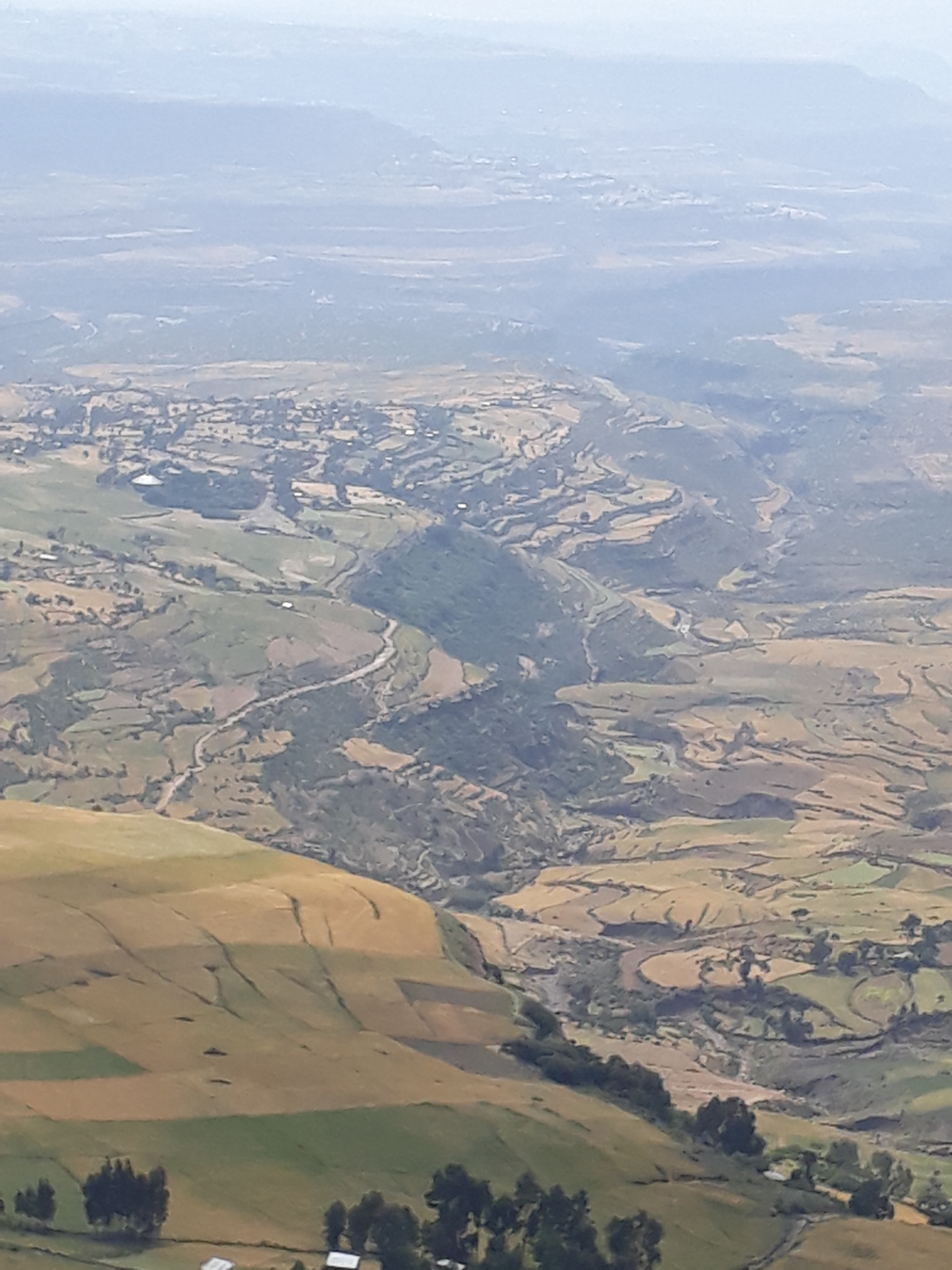
- The May Zegzeg gorge at Hech'i

- May Zegzeg River in Dogu’a Tembien
- Etymology: Cascading water in Tigrinya

Location
- Country: Ethiopia
- Region: Tigray Region
- District (woreda): Dogu’a Tembien

Physical characteristics
- Source: May Sho'ate
  - location: Harena in Mika'el Abiy municipality
  - elevation: 2,270 m (7,450 ft)
- 2nd source: May Harena
  - location: Harena in Mika'el Abiy municipality
- Mouth: Rubaksa River
  - location: Rubaksa
  - coordinates: 13.614°N 39.226°E
  - elevation: 1,970 m (6,460 ft)
- Length: 7 km (4.3 mi)
- Width
  - average: 25 m (82 ft)

Basin features
- Progression: Rubaksa→ Giba→ Tekezé→ Atbarah→ Nile→ Mediterranean Sea
- River system: Permanent river
- Landmarks: Inda Meru’e lapiez
- Waterfalls: Several small waterfalls
- Topography: Mountains and deep gorges

The May Zegzeg is a river of the Nile basin. Rising in the mountains of Dogu’a Tembien in northern Ethiopia, it flows southward to empty finally in the Giba and Tekezé River.

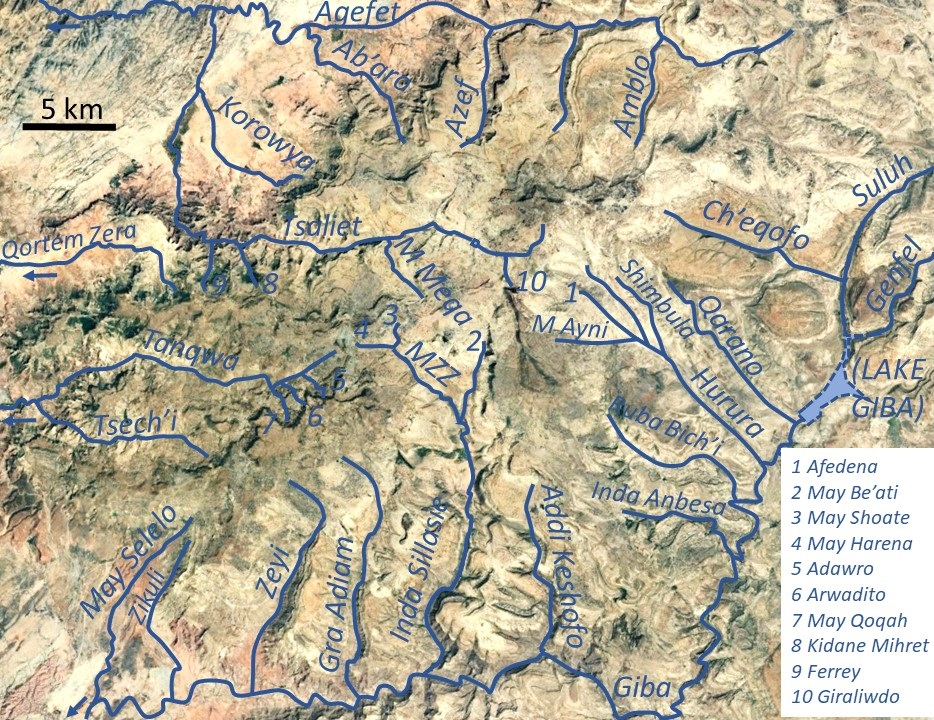
The May Zegzeg (MZZ) river in the radial drainage network of Dogu’a Tembien

== Characteristics ==
It is a confined river, locally meandering in its narrow alluvial plain, with an average slope gradient of 43 metres per kilometre. With its tributaries May Sho'ate and May Harena, the river has cut a gorge. Jointly with adjacent May Be’ati River, this river is the source of Rubaksa River.

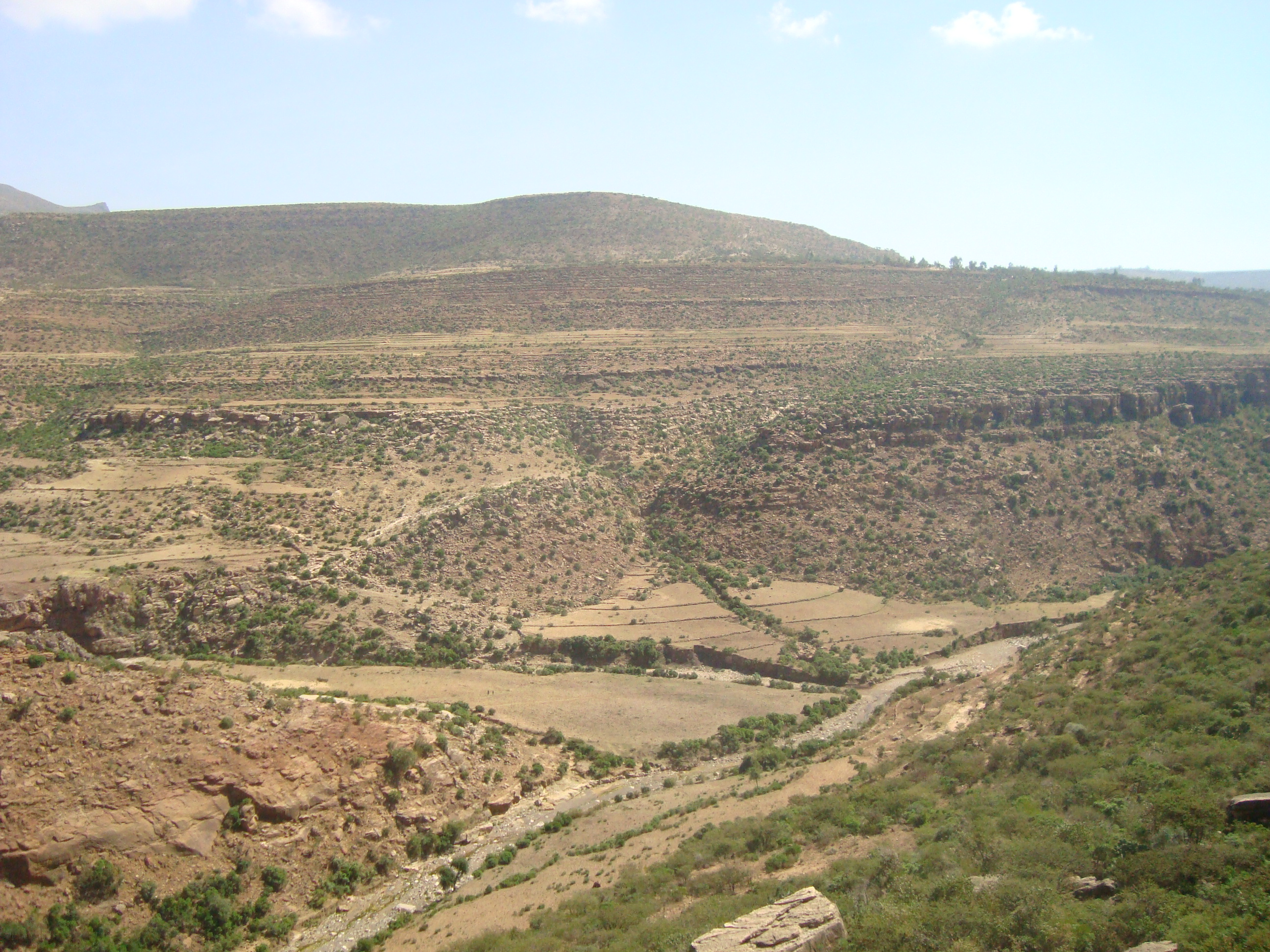
Coming from the north (left), May Zegzeg receives May Be’ati River and becomes Rubaksa River

== Flash floods and flood buffering ==
Runoff mostly happens in the form of high runoff discharge events that occur in a very short period (called flash floods). These are related to the steep topography, often little vegetation cover and intense convective rainfall. The peaks of such flash floods have often a 50 to 100 times larger discharge than the preceding baseflow. The magnitude of floods in this river has however been decreased due to interventions in the catchment. At Habdi Luqmuts and on other steep slopes, exclosures have been established; the dense vegetation largely contributes to enhanced infiltration, less flooding and better baseflow. Physical conservation structures such as stone bunds and check dams also intercept runoff.

== Boulders and pebbles in the river bed ==
Boulders and pebbles encountered in the river bed can originate from any location higher up in the catchment, including the following lithological units:

- Phonolite plugs
- Upper basalt
- Interbedded lacustrine deposits
- Lower basalt
- Amba Aradam Formation
- Antalo Limestone
- Quaternary freshwater tufa

== May Zegzeg Integrated Catchment Management Project ==
As part of outreach accompanying research in Dogu'a Tembien, the May Zegzeg Integrated Catchment Management Project was set up in 2004 in the catchment of the May Zegzeg River by researchers in cooperation with ADCS, a local NGO. The project included the implementation of conservation techniques to increase water infiltration and conserve the soil. The objective was to improve the livelihood of the communities of Harena, Hech'i and Addi Qolqwal as well as to demonstrate and promote global catchment management in the district. The results of the implementation of site-specific conservation techniques aimed at increasing water infiltration and conserving soil were particularly monitored in the headwaters at May Sho'ate: dry masonry stone bunds, check dams in gullies, and the set-aside of degraded rangelands which resulted in exclosures.

== Natural boundary ==
Over its full course, this river constitutes the border between Mika'el Abiy (at the west) and Ayninbirkekin municipalities (at the east)

== Trekking along the river ==
Trekking routes have been established across and along this river. The tracks are not marked on the ground but can be followed using downloaded .GPX files.

- Trek 12, runs parallel to the river on the eastern bank, from May Sho'ate to Rubaksa

In the rainy season, flash floods may occur and it is advised not to follow the river bed.

== See also ==
- List of Ethiopian rivers
