= Mika'el Abiy =

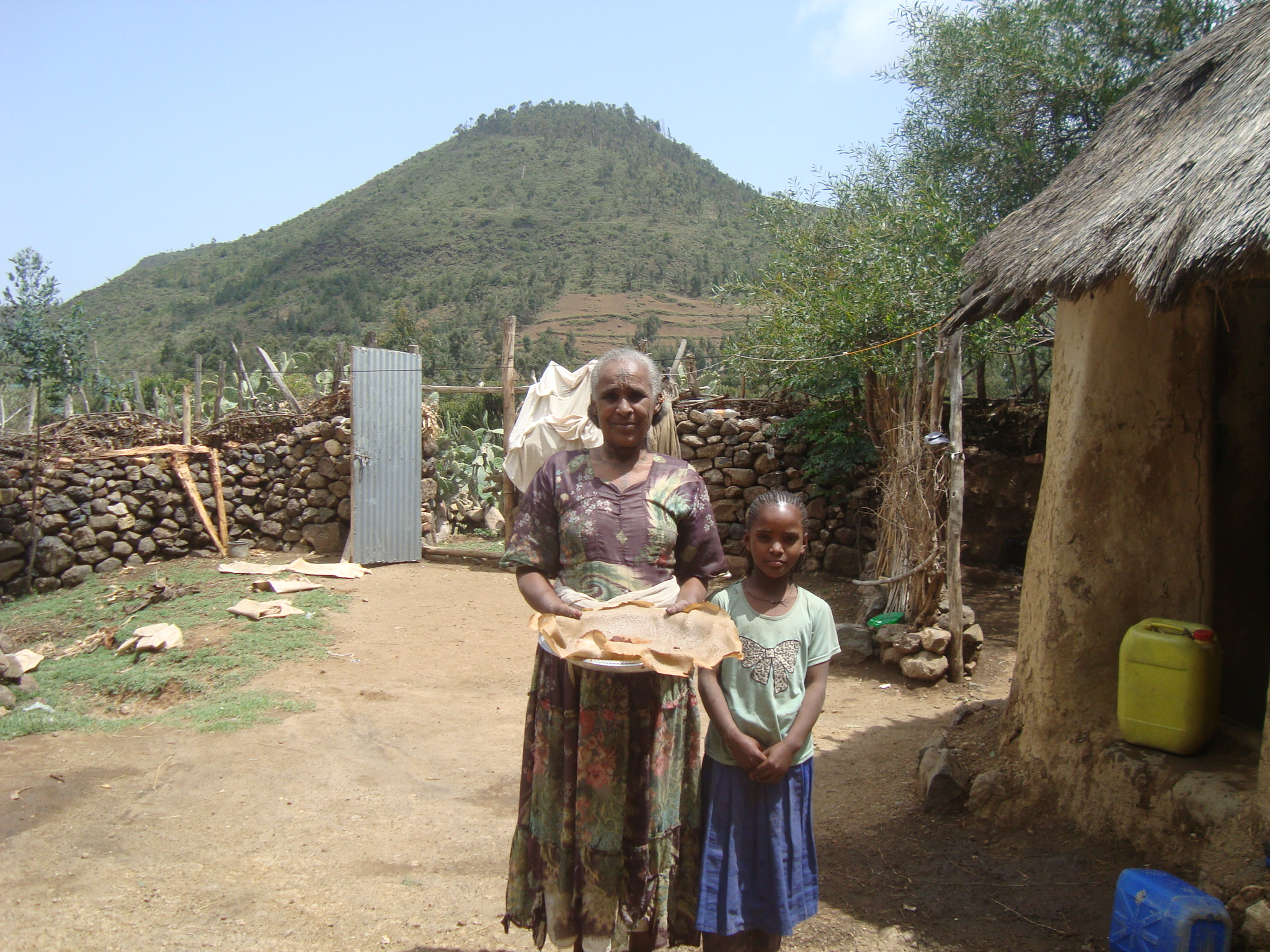
- Mount Gumawta dominates the Mika'el Abiy skyline

- Location within Ethiopia
- Coordinates: 13°37′N 39°12′E
- Country: Ethiopia
- Region: Tigray
- Zone: Debub Misraqawi (Southeastern)
- Woreda: Dogu'a Tembien

Area
  - Total: 33.76 km^{2} (13.03 sq mi)
- Elevation: 2,320 m (7,610 ft)

Population (2007)
  - Total: 5,698
  - Density: 169/km^{2} (440/sq mi)
- Time zone: UTC+3 (EAT)

Mika'el Abiy is a tabia or municipality in the Dogu'a Tembien district of the Tigray Region of Ethiopia. The tabia centre is in Megesta village, located approximately 7 km to the southeast of the woreda (town) Hagere Selam.

== Geography ==
The tabia stretches down south of the main road towards Rubaksa, which is a wider area with several springs and traditional irrigation. The highest peak is Gumawta (2815 m a.s.l.) on the Tsatsen plateau and the lowest place Rubaksa (1920 m a.s.l.).

=== Geology and soils ===
==== Geological formations ====
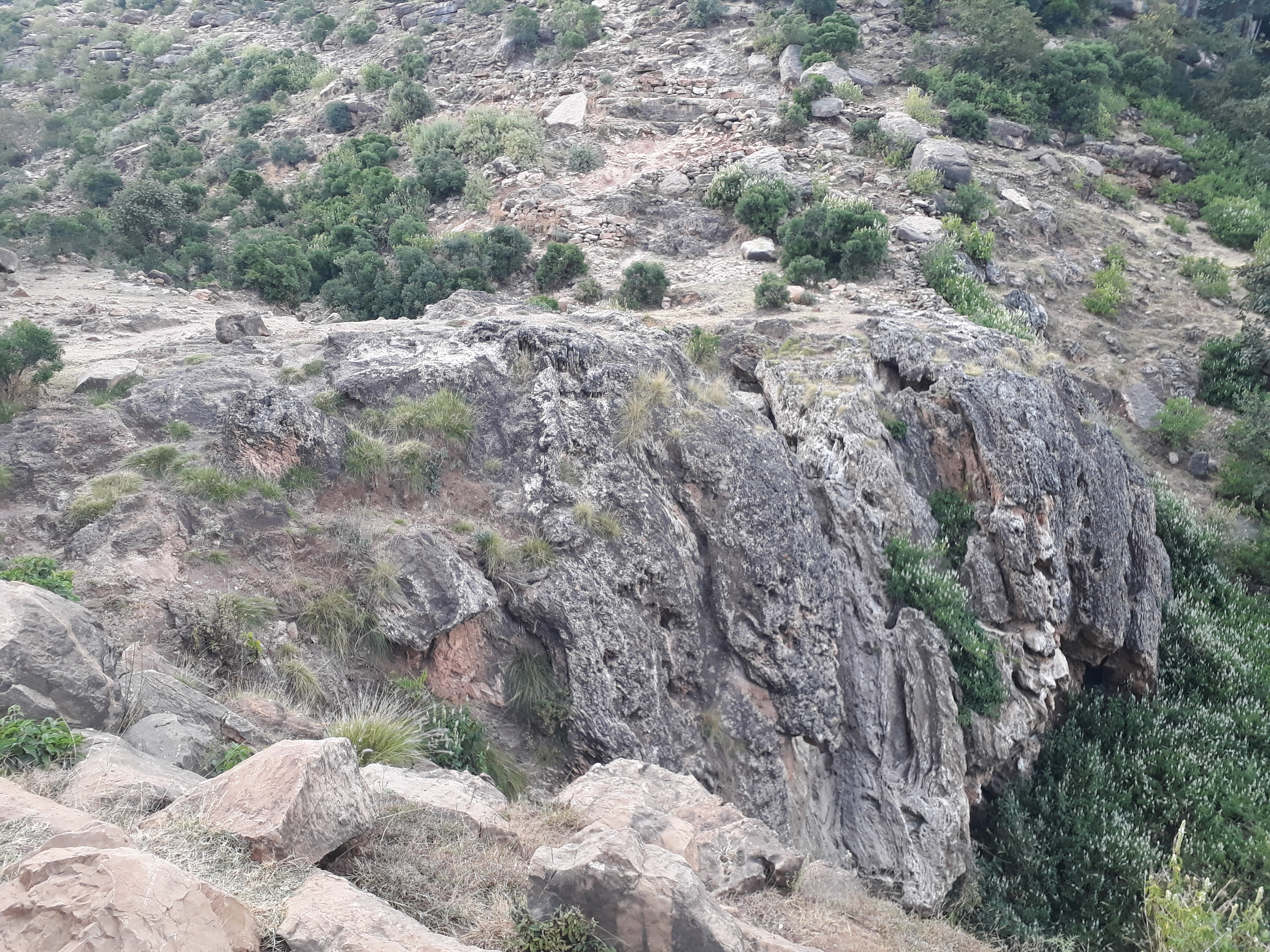
Rubaksa tufa plug

From the higher to the lower locations, the following geological formations are present:

- Upper basalt
- Interbedded lacustrine deposits
- Lower basalt
- Amba Aradam Formation
- Antalo Limestone
- Quaternary alluvium and freshwater tufa

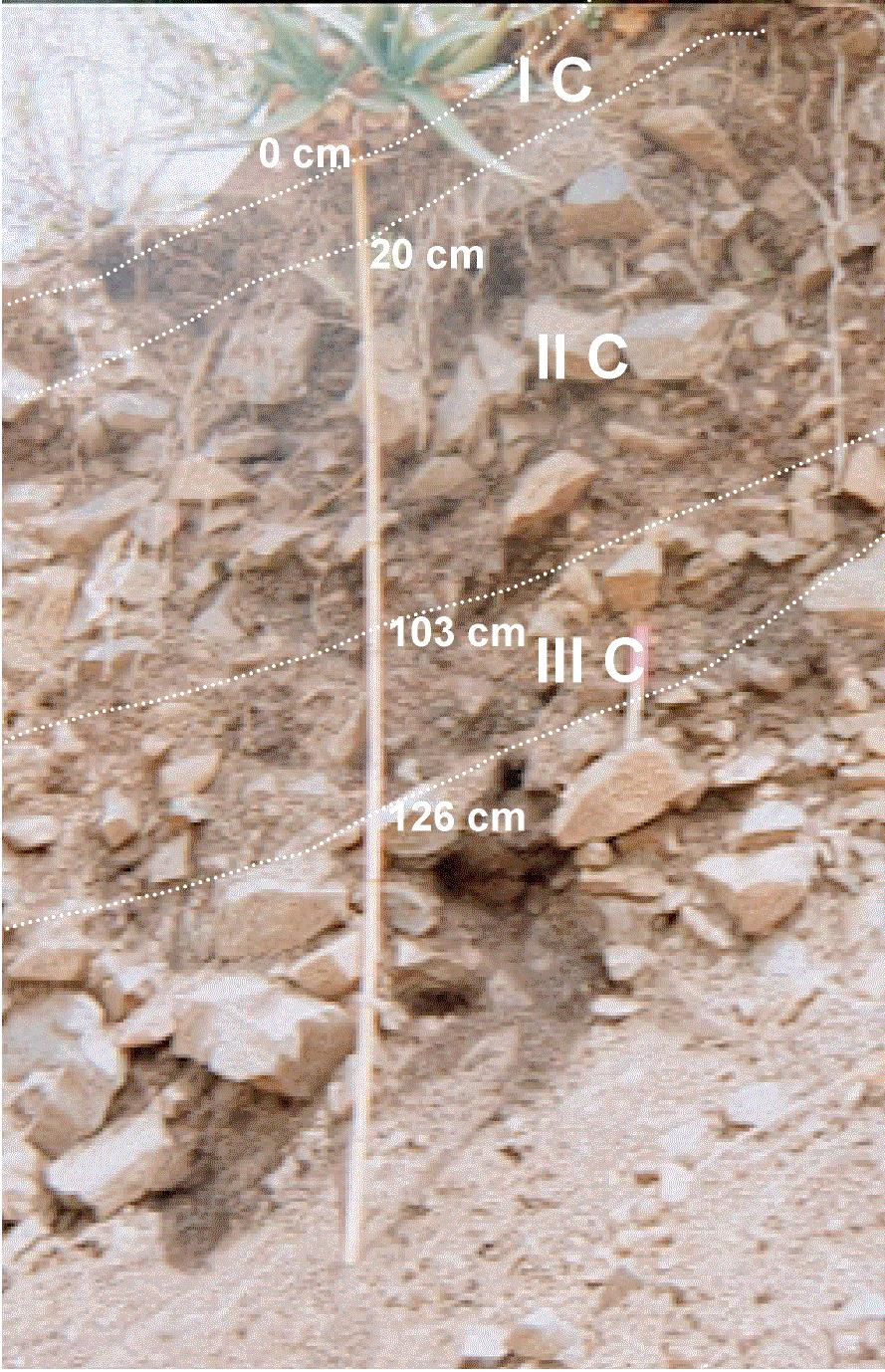
Humi-Cumuliskeletic Regosol at Kuliheni (upper Harena)

==== Soilscape ====
The main geomorphic units, with corresponding soil types are:

- Hagere Selam Highlands, along the basalt and sandstone ridge
  - Associated soil types
    - shallow soils with high stone contents (Skeletic Cambisol, Leptic Cambisol, Skeletic Regosol)
    - moderately deep dark stony clays with good natural fertility (Vertic Cambisol)
    - deep, dark cracking clays, temporarily waterlogged during the wet season (Pellic Vertisol)
  - Inclusions
    - Rock outcrops and very shallow soils (Lithic Leptosol)
    - Rock outcrops and very shallow soils on limestone (Calcaric Leptosol)
    - Deep dark cracking clays with very good natural fertility, waterlogged during the wet season (Chromic Vertisol, Pellic Vertisol)
    - Shallow stony dark loams on calcaric material (Calcaric Regosol, Calcaric Cambisol)
    - Brown loamy soils on basalt with good natural fertility (Luvisol)

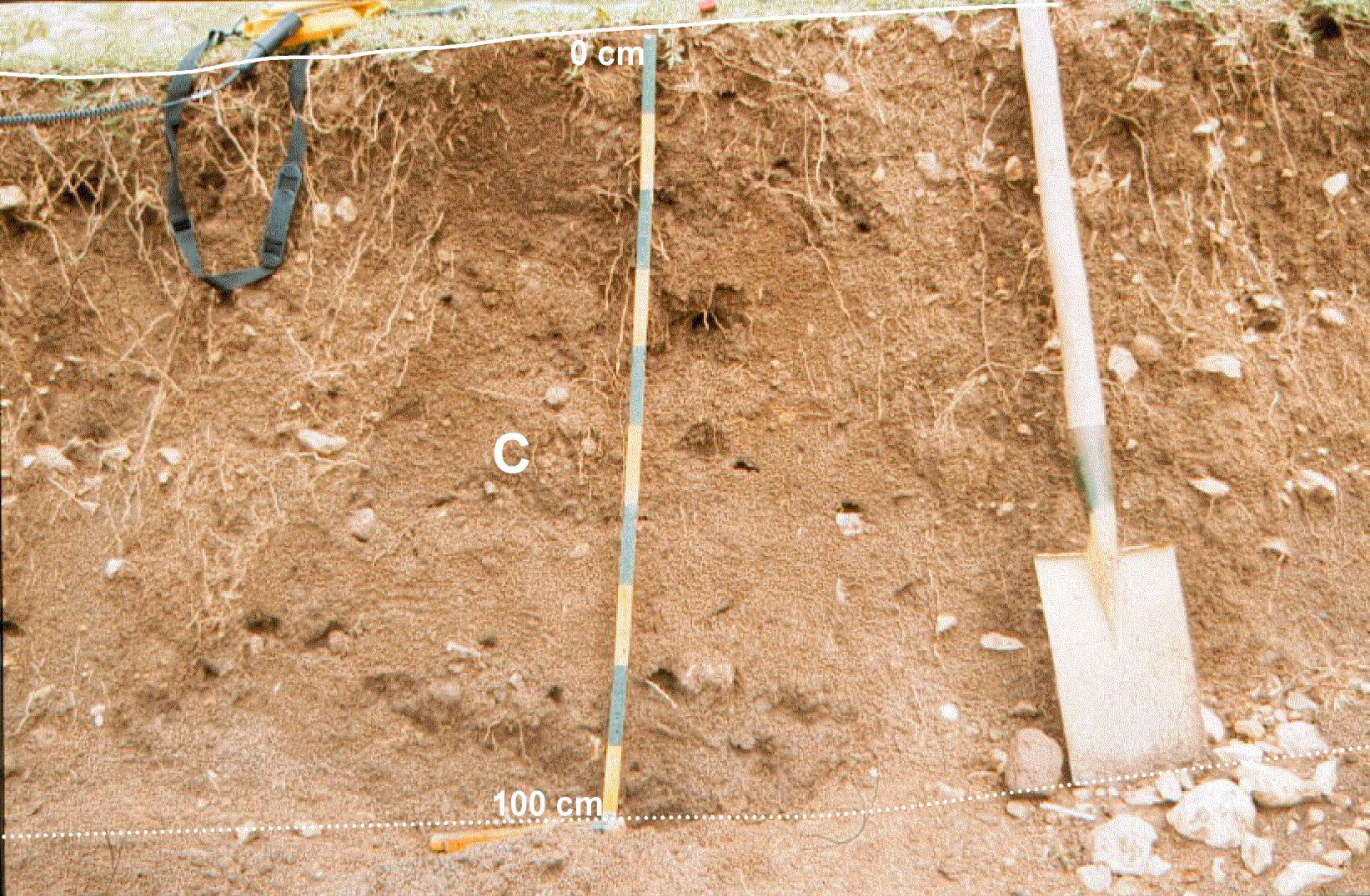
Humi-Cumulicalcaric Regosol at May Addi Abagie in Harena

- Gently rolling Antalo Limestone plateau, holding cliffs and valley bottoms on limestone
  - Associated soil types
    - shallow stony soils with a dark surface horizon overlying calcaric material (Calcaric Leptosol)
    - moderately deep dark stony clays with good natural fertility (Vertic Cambisol)
    - deep, dark cracking clays on calcaric material (Calcaric Vertisol, Calcic Vertisol)
  - Inclusions
    - Rock outcrops and very shallow soils (Lithic Leptosol)
    - Shallow very stony loamy soil on limestone (Skeletic Calcaric Cambisol)
    - Deep dark cracking clays with very good natural fertility, waterlogged during the wet season (Chromic Vertisol, Pellic Vertisol)
    - Brown to dark sands and silt loams on alluvium (Vertic Fluvisol, Eutric Fluvisol, Haplic Fluvisol) and colluvium (Calcaric Regosol)

=== Springs ===
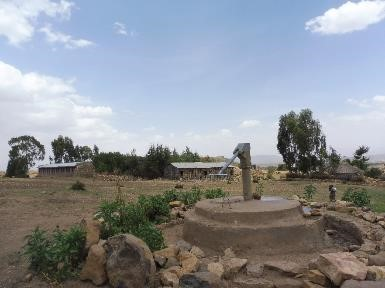
Selam Seret community hand pump

As there are no permanent rivers, the presence of springs is of utmost importance for the local people. The following are the main springs in the tabia:

- May Zahla in Dingilet
- May Ayni in Rubaksa

=== Livelihood ===
The population lives essentially from crop farming, supplemented with off-season work in nearby towns. The land is dominated by farmlands which are clearly demarcated and are cropped every year. Hence the agricultural system is a permanent upland farming system, and the population are not nomads.

=== Population ===
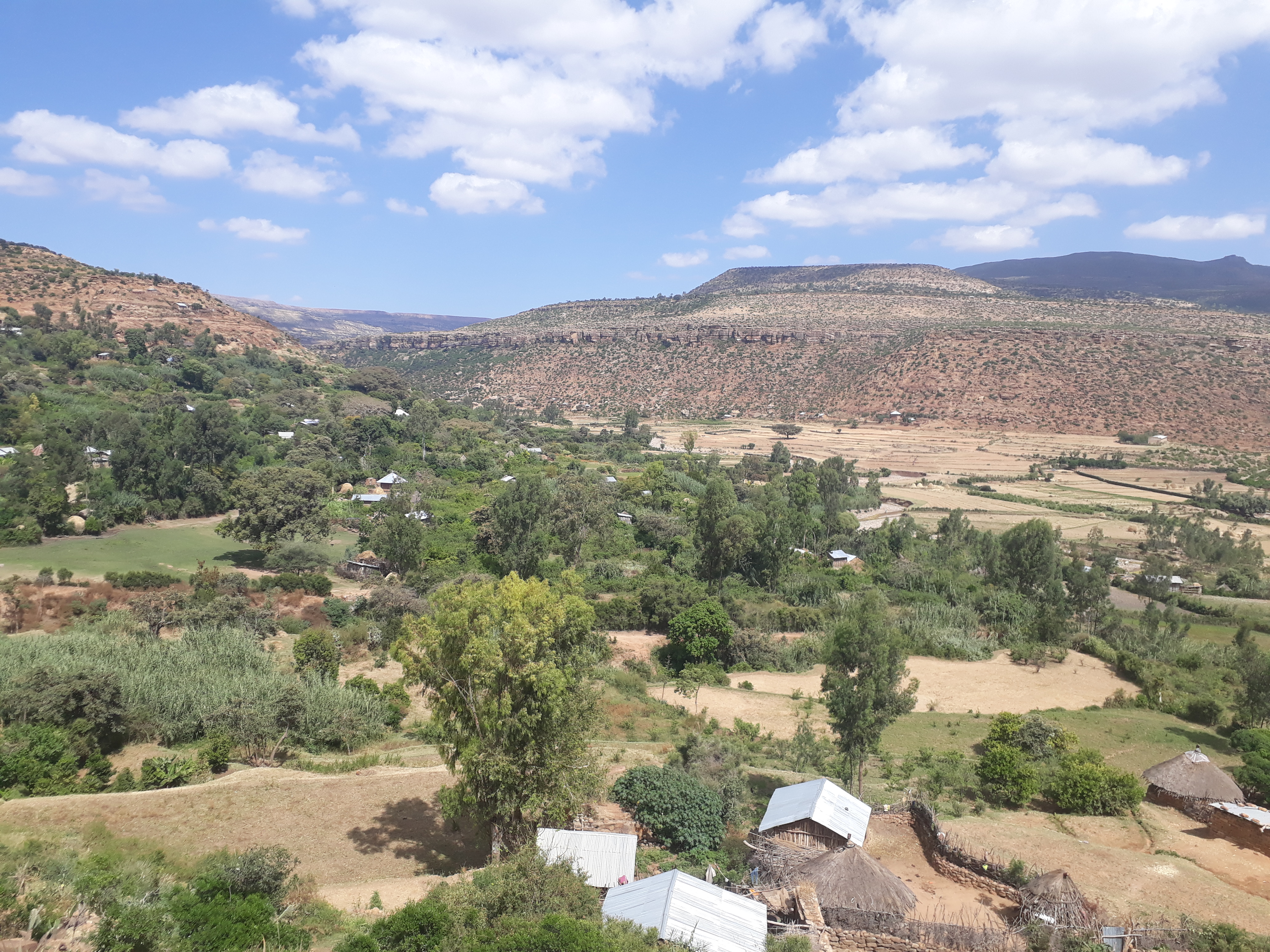
Rubaksa gardens

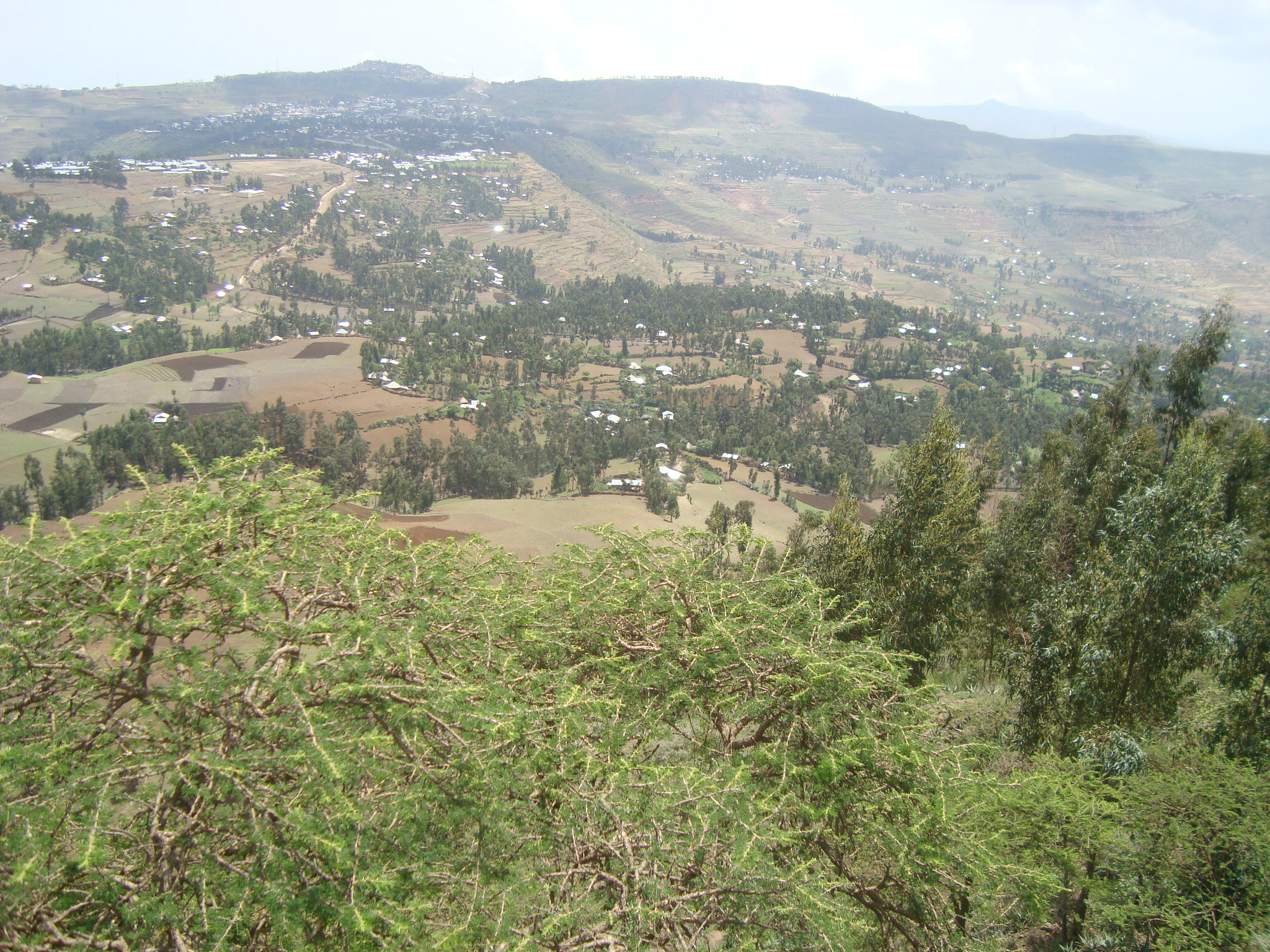
The village of Dingilet expands rapidly towards Hagere Selam (at the back)

The tabia centre Megesta holds a few administrative offices and some small shops. The villages close to Hagere Selam (Dingilet and Harena) have established a new settlement, at the margin of Hagere Selam, where the inhabitants benefit from the proximity of the town. The main other populated places in the tabia are:

- Awulo
- Rubaksa
- T'eshi
- Addi Kwanti

- Gabla Imni
- Haddush Addi
- Dingilet
- Harena

=== Religion and churches ===
Most inhabitants are Orthodox Christians.

=== Legends and myths ===
In the northern part of Harena, called Argak'a, there is a large rock of more than 50 m^{2} - a legend says that a certain Ilias transported it up to there.

== Roads and communication ==
The main road Mekelle – Hagere Selam – Abiy Addi runs at the north and west of the tabia.

== Schools ==
Almost all children of the tabia attend school and in some schools there is lack of classrooms, due to the large intake in primary schools.

== Gallery ==
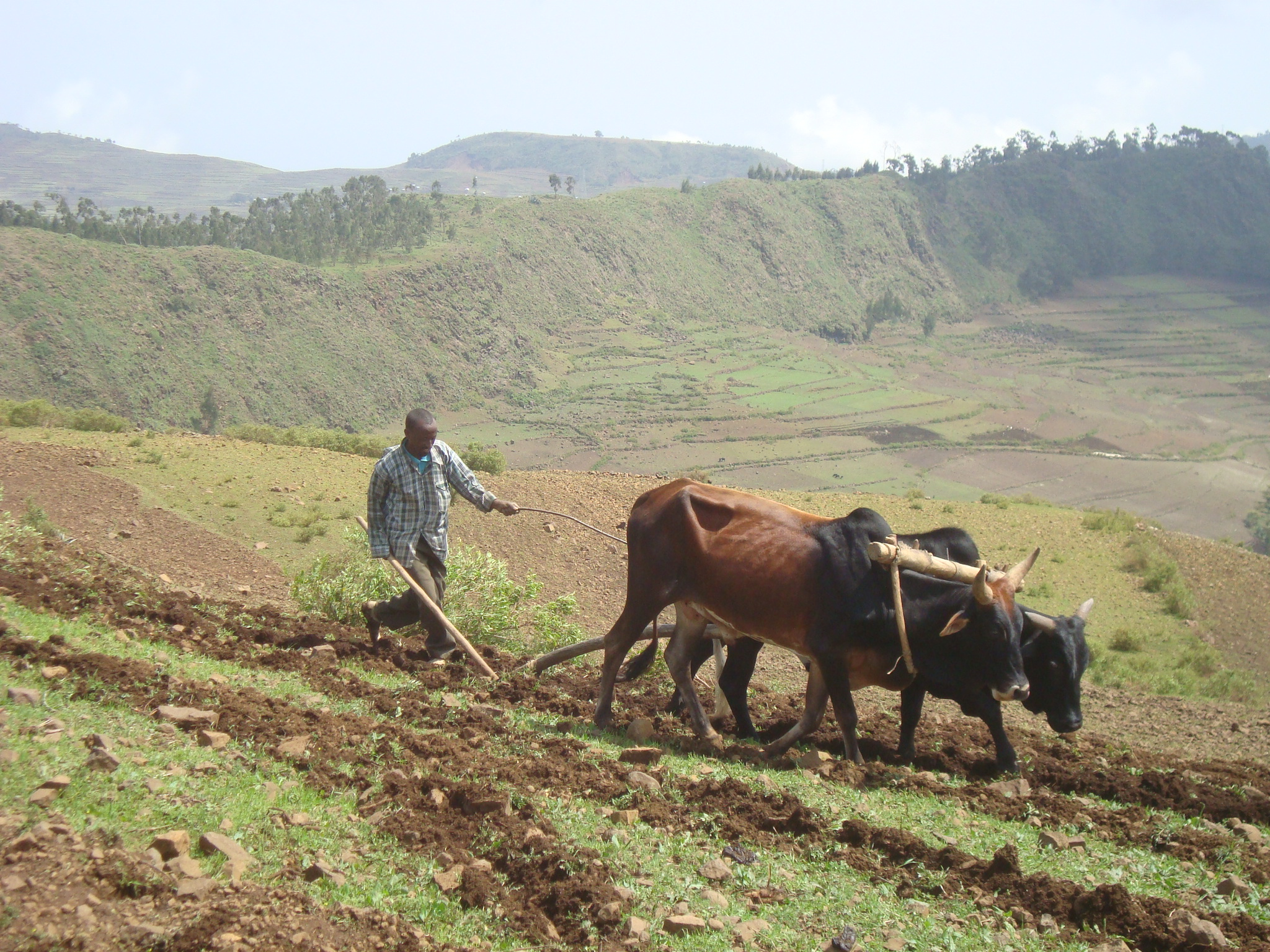
A farmer ploughing at Haddush Addi.

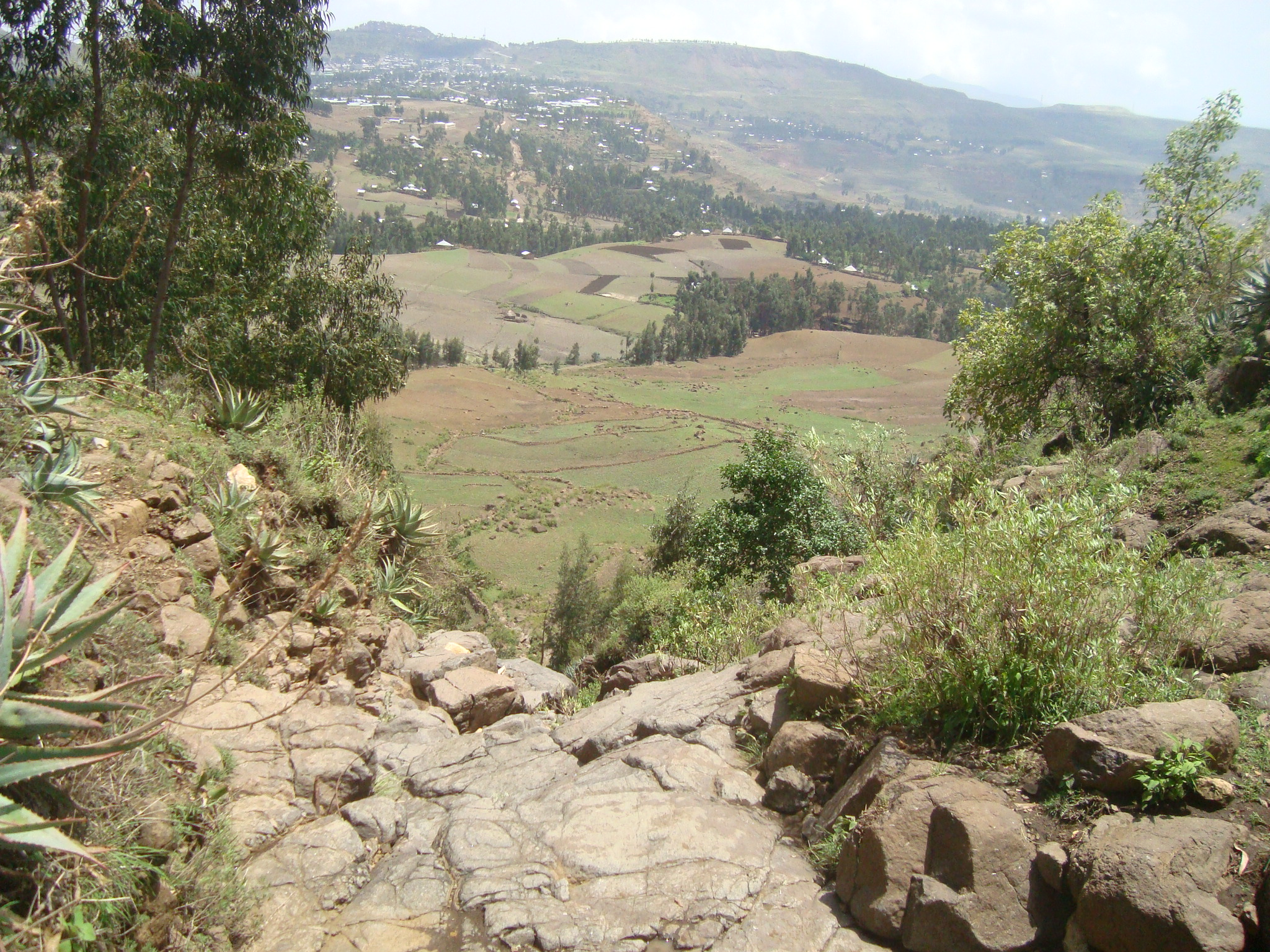
View towards Dingilet from Mt Gumawta.

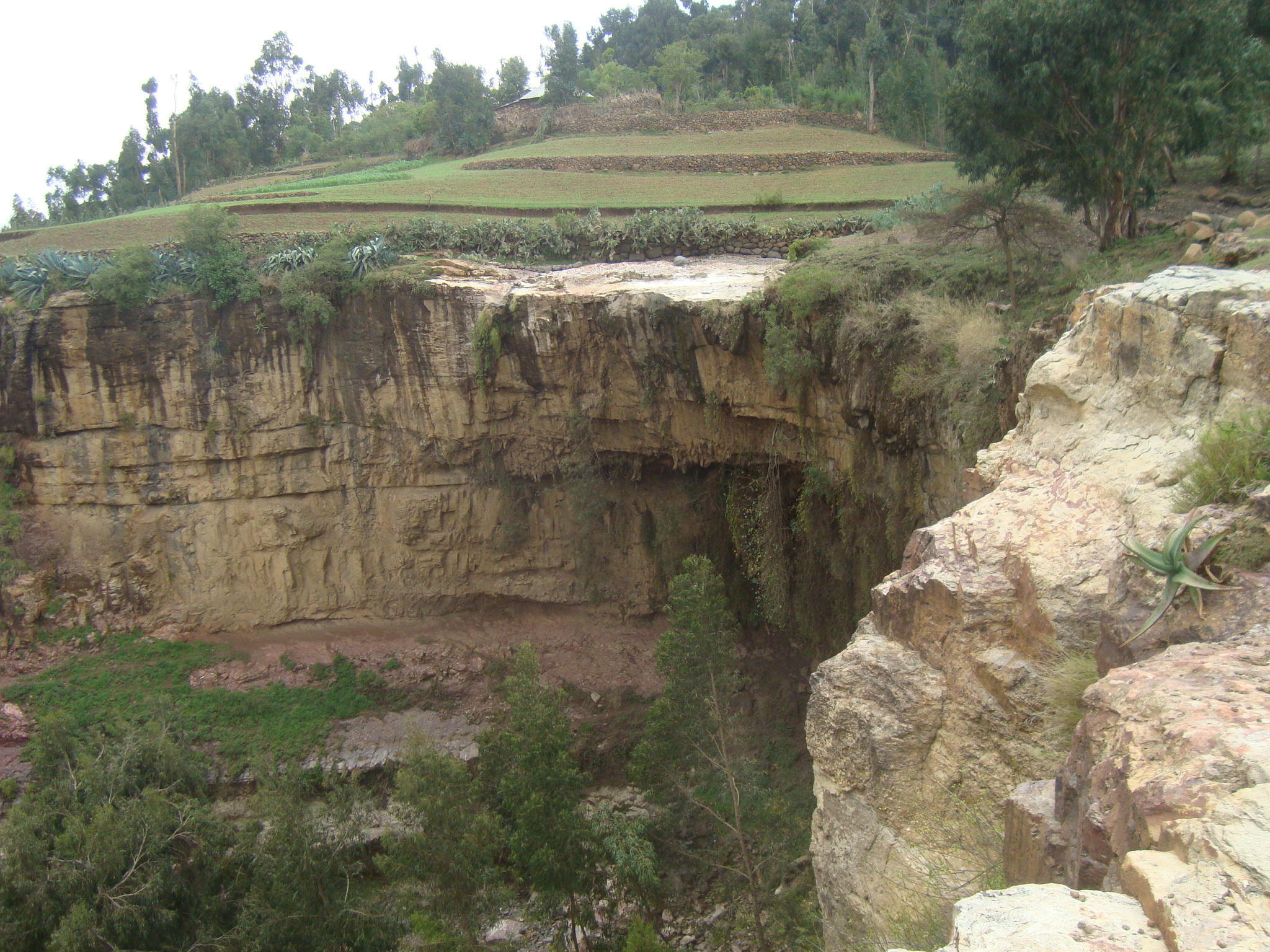
Waterfall in Dingilet.
