= Swale (landform) =

Shady spot, marshy place or shallow channel

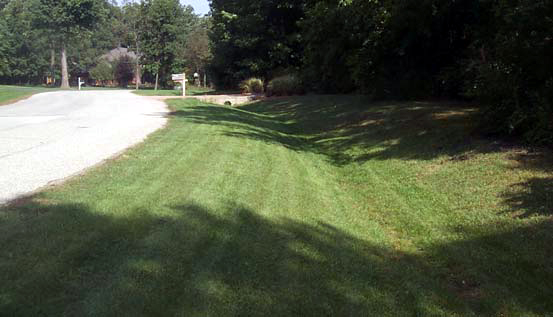
A constructed swale or bioswale built in a residential area to manage stormwater runoff

A swale is a shady spot, or a sunken or marshy place. In US usage in particular, it is a shallow channel with gently sloping sides. Such a swale may be either natural or human-made. Artificial swales are often infiltration basins, designed to manage water runoff, filter pollutants, and increase rainwater infiltration. Bioswales are swales that involve the inclusion of plants or vegetation in their construction, specifically.

== On land ==
The use of swales has been popularized as a rainwater-harvesting and soil-conservation strategy by Bill Mollison, David Holmgren, and other advocates of permaculture. In this context a swale is usually a water-harvesting ditch on contour, also called a contour bund.

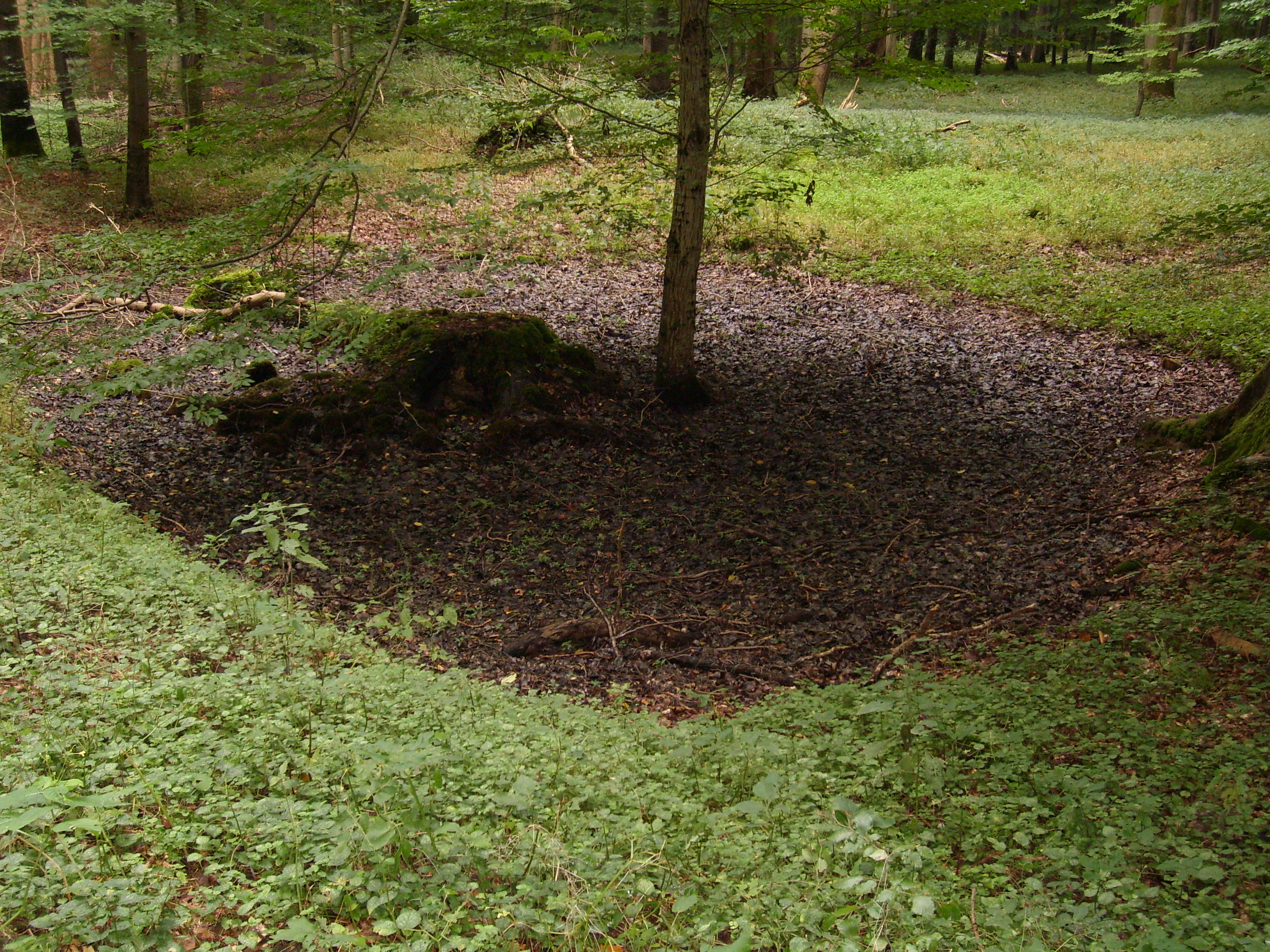
A natural swale

Swales as used in permaculture are designed by permaculturalists to slow and capture runoff by spreading it horizontally across the landscape (along an elevation contour line), facilitating runoff infiltration into the soil. This archetypal form of swale is a dug-out, sloped, often grassed or reeded "ditch" or "lull" in the landform. One option involves piling the soil onto a new bank on the still lower slope, in which case a bund or berm is formed, mitigating the natural (and often hardscape-increased) risks to slopes below and to any linked watercourse from flash flooding.

In arid and seasonally dry places, vegetation (existing or planted) in the swale benefits heavily from the concentration of runoff. Trees and shrubs along the swale can provide shade and mulch which decrease evaporation.

== On beaches ==
The term "swale" or "beach swale" is also used to describe long, narrow, usually shallow troughs between ridges or sandbars on a beach, that run parallel to the shoreline.

== See also ==
- Contour trenching
- Gutter
- Keyline design
- Rain garden
- Stormwater
- Water-sensitive urban design
