= Contour trenching =

Conservation technique in agriculture

Contour trenching (a.k.a., Continuous Contour Trench or CCT) is an agricultural technique that can be easily applied in arid sub-Sahara areas to allow for water, and soil conservation, and to increase agricultural production.

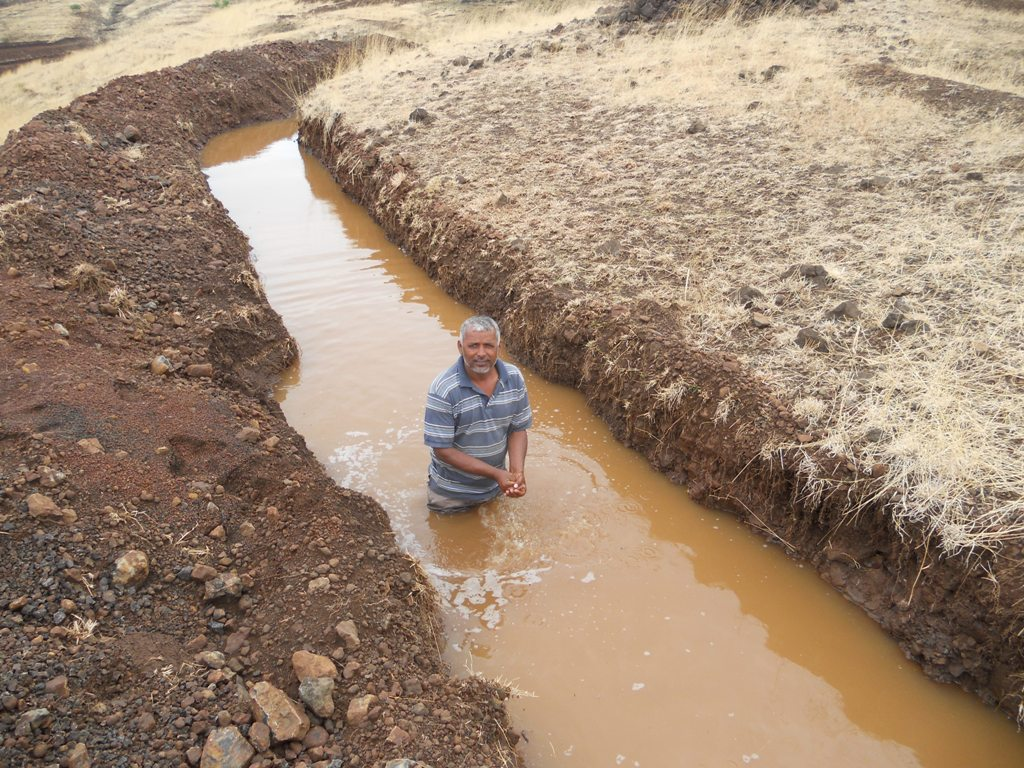
A deep continuous contour trench in Maharashtra, India

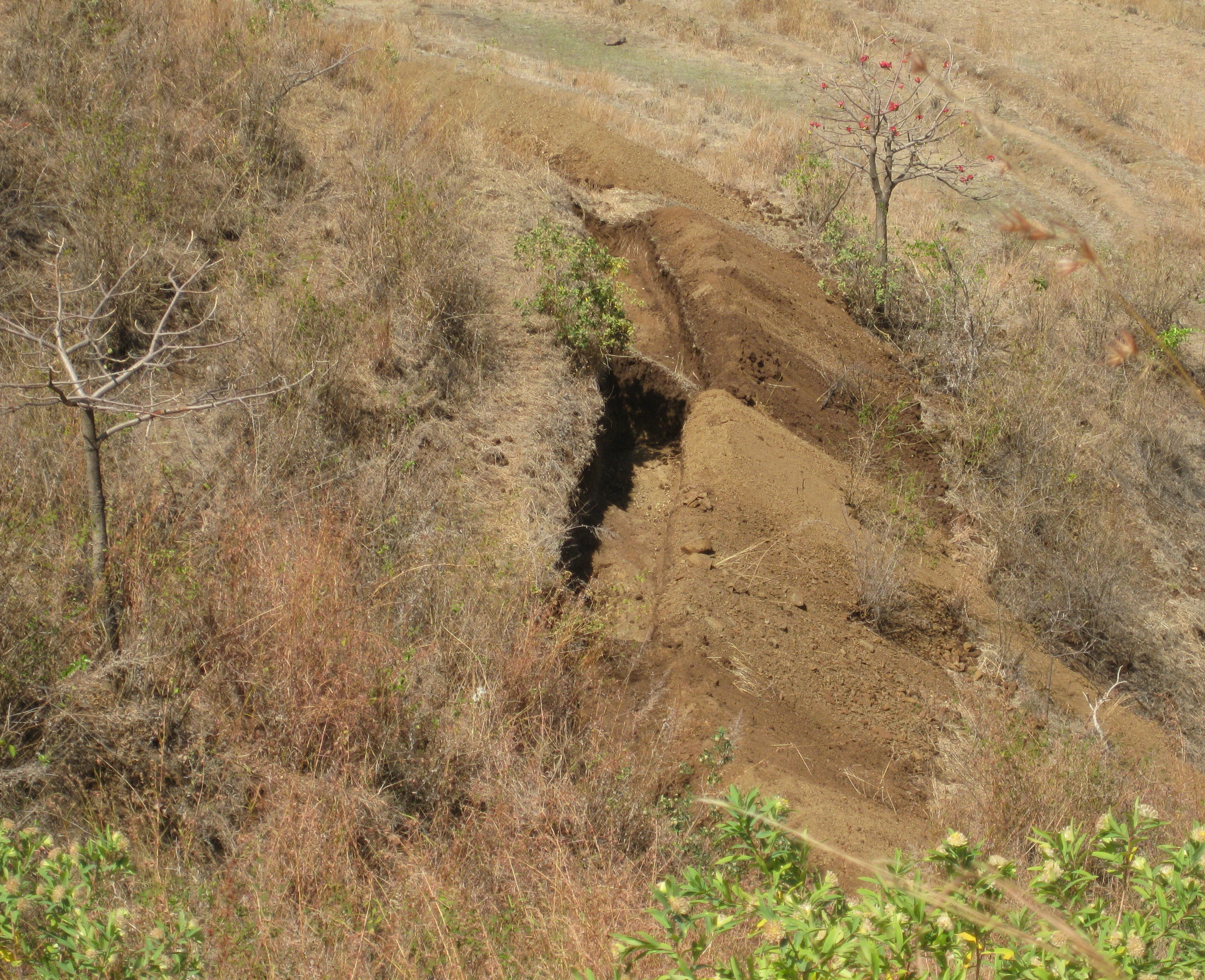
A contour trenchline in India

Between two trenches crops can benefit during the growing season (when there is less rain) from the subsoil water reserve gathered during the rainy season.

== Advantages ==
Immediate advantages are the following:

- The rain water does not immediately run off the hill,
- Water does not evaporate uselessly
- The water balance is enhanced
- Crops do not suffer later on from water shortage,
- Fertile soil particles are not lost by water and wind erosion.
- When the sun shines on the water, light and heat are reflected onto plants on the northern shore of the trench, this effect and the increased humidity create micro climates in the area. These micro climates can support plants from different hardiness zones.

== Techniques ==
Trenches can be artificially dug along the contour lines, across the slope so that water flowing down the hill is retained by the trench, and is infiltrating the soil below.

== Implementation ==
Depending on the slope of the hill, the parallel trenches can be closer or further from one another.

Manually dug trenches are smaller. Machine dug trenches can be deeper. The dimensions, and the format of the trench should correspond to the local climate and soil conditions. The trench should be big enough to keep all the water; no water should spill over the downhill border. The upside of the trench should be protected against erosion, by means of e.g. grass, shrubs, or fabric.

== See also ==
- Swale (landform)
- Keyline design
- Terrace (agriculture)
- Groundwater recharge
- Hydrology (agriculture)
- Infiltration (hydrology)
