= Allan Yeomans =

Australian author, cultural critic and farmer (1931–2024)

- Born: Allan James Yeomans; 03 October, 1931
- Died: 15 February, 2024
- Education: University of Sydney
- Occupation: Climate Activist
- Spouse: Chris Yeomans
- Website: https://yeomansconcepts.com/

Allan James Yeomans (3 October 1931 – 15 February 2024) was an Australian agriculturist, design engineer, author, lecturer, and inventor. He argued that it is possible to bring global warming and climate under control and restore weather systems to normal at negligible cost while simultaneously improving our wealth and standard of living.

== Early life and education ==
Yeomans was born in Sydney on 3 October 1931. He grew up in North Richmond, on his family's farm. He attended primary schools in a series of gold mining towns throughout Eastern Australia, then attending Scots College (Sydney) for secondary school.

He attended Sydney University and studied engineering, and physics under Professor Harry Messel. He left university and manufactured water skis. However, subsequently he completed the first postgraduate course on computing using the SILLIAC computer. This was the Sydney University sister unit to the then new ILLIAC "supercomputer" developed at the University of Illinois. At Sydney University he also completed a postgraduate course in nuclear energy and radioisotopes.

Yeomans joined the family business, open-cut coal mining. Then with his father P.A. Yeomans, he set up operations in 1952 to manufacture the Graham Hoeme Chisel Plow from Amarillo, Texas. Australia was only the second country in the world to produce this new type of cultivating implement.

He started his own business in 1957, initially manufacturing furniture. His Banana Chair became a household word in Australia. He also set up and produced the chaise longue in Los Angeles in 1961.

== Keyline and plows ==
Yeomans was involved with the development of his father's Keyline design system of agriculture and was instrumental in naming the system "Keyline". His father P.A. Yeomans sold the chisel plough business in 1964 and restrictions were placed on both father and son to prevent their involvement in agricultural machinery for a stipulated period.

In 1980, he purchased a semi-defunct agricultural manufacturing business in central NSW and moved to Forbes, where he met and married his second wife Chris.

The subsoiler plough concept, a second generation chisel plough being developed prior to the sale of the family business, had been placed on hold; its development was eventually restarted. The operation was moved to Queensland in 1990 and his company continues to manufacture and further develop this second generation chisel plough. Units have been delivered to organic and sustainable orientated farmers in South Africa, South East Asia, Europe and the Americas.

== Building ==
In 1960, he became a builder and built several hundred houses, along with the first modern major high-rise residential building in Australia, in the early 1960s. The building is "Colebrook" in Double Bay, Sydney, and has one hundred and eighteen apartments and nineteen stories.

== Aircraft ==
Yeomans produced aircraft tooling for Qantas and the Royal Australian Air Force, undertook classified research for the Royal Australian Navy, built small ship componentry and transport equipment for the Australian Army.

He has logged several thousand hours racing gliders, a sport where he held a senior instructor rating. In 1968, he became the first person to cross the Australian Blue Mountains in a sailplane. He flies light aircraft, helicopters and gyrocopters and also ultralights where he held a Chief Flying Instructor rating. He is a competent meteorologist and has acted as advising meteorologist and task setter at State and National Gliding Competitions in Australia.

In 2012, at age 81, he took up aerobatics and purchased his own Pitts Special S2B competition aerobatic biplane. He competed in State aerobatic competition, the last being the 2016 New South Wales State Competition where he competed in Sportsman Class. At age 85 he was considered as one of the oldest competition aerobatic pilots in the world.

== Global warming and climate change ==
Yeomans started compiling information and warning people in talks and lectures about global warming in the mid to late 1980s. His book Priority One - Together We Can Beat Global Warming resulted from those actions. The book relies heavily on both his experience in soil fertility enhancement, and meteorology. In 1990, he was the only non-American invited to attend, and to participate in, a three-day, twenty-two person "think tank" to define the future of agriculture in the United States. It was held at the Esalen Institute in Big-Sur, California. It resulted in the Asilomar Declaration on Sustainable Agriculture. At this conference he presented a paper "An Agricultural Solution to the Greenhouse Effect" in which he proposed the then novel concept of absorbing atmospheric carbon into soil by the systematic enhancement of soil fertility levels. The concept is becoming internationally accepted and has become the basic tenets of the organization, Carbon Farmers of America.

His concept of the sequestration of atmospheric carbon dioxide by the enhancement of soil fertility was, as of 2010, adopted as policy by the Australian Federal Opposition parties. Allan Yeomans also strongly supported the overall adoption of nuclear energy for industrial power. He advocated for a switch to biofuels for all transport, and for these to be produced in what are currently tropical rain forests. He argued that we have no other safe practical alternatives. He criticized what he considered the predilection of the major world environmental movements to species survival, while effectively ignoring meaningful global warming prevention issues.

== Personal life and death ==
His sports and hobbies included skin diving, scuba diving, and competitive water skiing (one time national jump record holder. 1953 Marathon Event 7 hours 55.5 minutes). He was married in London in 1953 and was divorced in 1968. He had five daughters. His second wife Chris created the "Save The Farm Fund" charity in the drought ridden 1990s. In 1995 she was named Gold Coast Citizen of the Year. She was awarded Queenslander of the Year for Queensland Day in 1996 and a runner up for Australian of the Year, also in 1996. Chris was awarded an Order of Australia in 1997. A park on the Gold Coast was named the "Chris Yeomans Park" in her honour.

His father, P.A. Yeomans, and mother Rita Yeomans are both now dead.

Allan Yeomans died on 15 February 2024, at the age of 92.
