= Ericaceous =

Ericaceous may refer to:

- Ericaceae, the heather family
- Calcifuges, all plants which dislike alkaline (chalky) soil – including heathers, rhododendron and camellia
- Ericaceous bed, a bed with acidic soil typically having a pH between 4.5 and 6 used for growing Calcifuges
