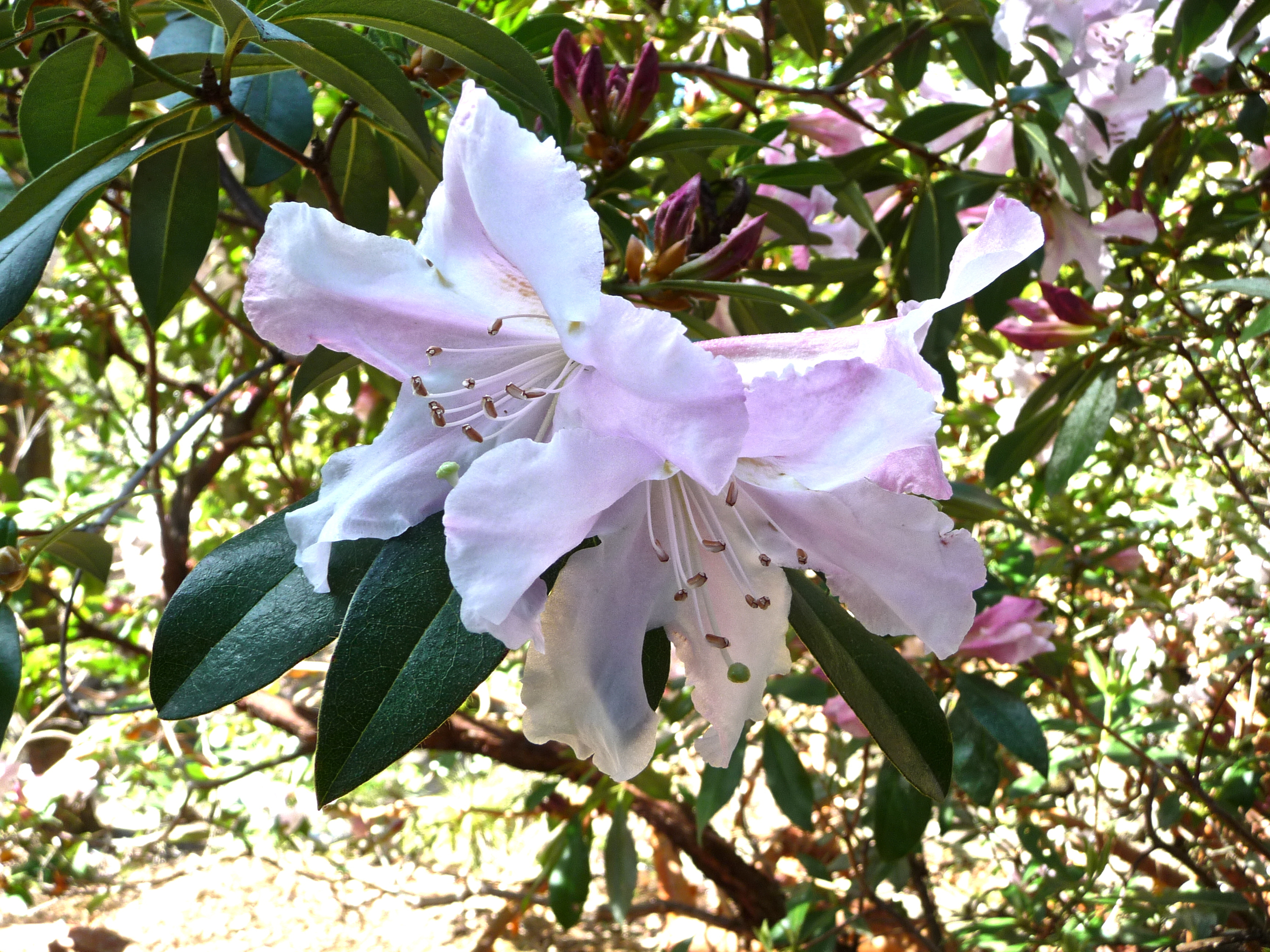

Scientific classification
- Kingdom: Plantae
- Clade: Tracheophytes
- Clade: Angiosperms
- Clade: Eudicots
- Clade: Asterids
- Order: Ericales
- Family: Ericaceae
- Genus: Rhododendron
- Species: R. veitchianum

Binomial name
- Rhododendron veitchianum Hook. f.

Synonyms
- Azalea veitchiana (Hook.) Kuntze; Rhododendron cubittii Hutch.; Rhododendron smilesii Hutch.

= Rhododendron veitchianum =

Species of flowering plant

Rhododendron veitchianum is a species of flowering plant in the heath family Ericaceae, native to Myanmar, Thailand, and Laos, where it grows at altitudes of 900–2,400 m (3,000–7,900 ft)

Growing to 2–3 m (6.6–9.8 ft) in height, it is an evergreen shrub, with obovate or narrowly elliptic leaves, 6.5–10 cm (2.6–3.9 in) by 2–4 cm (0.79–1.57 in) in size. The large trumpet-shaped flowers are 5–6.5 cm (2.0–2.6 in) in diameter, white, often with a yellow blotch at the base.

In temperate zones Rhododendron veitchianum must be grown in a large greenhouse or conservatory, in extremely well-drained acidic (ericaceous) soil.
