= Nicholas Burtner =

American permaculturist and consultant

Nicholas Burtner is an American permaculturist and consultant. Based in the Dallas, Texas area, he has advised on many landscape projects involving the utilization of keyline design and climate-suitable plants. Since 2012, he has operated the School of Permculture, an educational and consulting firm. In addition, Burtner is a devout Christian, and says he builds his organization around Christ.

== See also ==
- Brad Lancaster
