= Guter =

Guter may be the name of:

- Donald J. Guter (born 1948), American educator and navy officer
- Guter Fernández de Castro (flourished 1124–66), Castilian nobleman and military commander
- Johannes Guter (1882–1962), Latvian-born German filmmaker
- Mattias Guter (born 1988), Swedish ice hockey player

== See also ==
- Gutter (disambiguation)
