= Gutter =

Gutter may refer to:

== Water discharge structures ==
- Rain gutter, used on roofs and in buildings
- Street gutter, for drainage of streets

== Film ==
- The Gutter (1938 film), a French film
- The Gutter (2024 film), an American film

== Design and printing ==
- Gutter (typography), the space between columns of printed text
- Gutter, in bookbinding, page edges joined to the spine
- Gutter (philately), the space between panes of postage stamps that creates configurations of "gutter pairs" or "gutter blocks"

== Other uses ==
- Gutters, in bowling and table shuffleboard, the trough hazards on either side of the playing lane into which the bowling ball or shuffleboard puck may fall
- "Gutter" (song), a song by Medina
- "Gutter", a 2026 song by Melanie Martinez from Hades

== See also ==
- Guter (disambiguation)
