= P. A. Yeomans =

Australian inventor

Percival Alfred Yeomans (1905 - November 1984) was an Australian inventor known for the Keyline system for the development of land and increasing the fertility of that land. As a mining engineer and gold assayer, Yeomans had developed a keen sense of hydrology and equipment design. Upon his brother-in-law's death in a grass fire, P.A. Yeomans assumed management of a large tract of land he later named Nevallan in New South Wales. There he developed improved methods and equipment for cultivation. His designs won him The Prince Philip Design Award Australia in 1974.

His Keyline principles or concepts (Keyline Design) have been adopted by farm owners in almost every country in the world. Yeomans' Keyline concepts are now part of the curriculum of many sustainable agriculture courses in colleges and universities across the world. His ideas have also been a key factor in the development of permaculture design. P.A. Yeomans wrote four books: The Keyline Plan, The Challenge of Landscape, Water For Every Farm and The City Forest.

== See also ==
- Keyline design
- Permaculture
- Allan Yeomans
