= Hydrophobic soil =

Soil whose particles repel water

Hydrophobic soil is a soil whose particles repel water. The layer of hydrophobicity is commonly found at or a few centimeters below the surface, parallel to the soil profile. This layer can vary in thickness and abundance and is typically covered by a layer of ash or burned soil.

== Formation and structure ==
Hydrophobic soil is most familiarly formed when a fire or hot air disperses waxy compounds found in the uppermost litter layer consisting of organic matter. After the compounds disperse, they mainly coat sandy soil particles near the surface in the upper layers of soil, making the soil hydrophobic. Other producers of hydrophobic coatings are contamination and industrial spillages along with soil microbial activity. Hydrophobicity can also be seen as a natural soil property that results from the degradation of natural vegetation such as Eucalyptus that has natural wax properties.

It was found that in a particular New Zealand sand, this waxy lipid coating consisted of primarily hydrocarbons and triglycerides that were basic in pH along with a lesser value of acidic long-chain fatty acids. Capillary penetration amongst soil particles is limited by the hydrophobic coating on the particles, resulting in water repellence in each particle affected as the hydrophilic head of the lipid attaches itself to the sand particle leaving the hydrophobic tail shielding the outside of the particle. This can be seen in Figure 1 below.

Figure 1: The structure of a hydrophobic sand particle versus an unaffected soil particle. The hydrophobic soil particle is coated in a wax-like lipid compound with a hydrophilic head is attached to the individual particle and the hydrophobic tail is surrounding the outside of the particle. This hydrophobic tail shields any water from being absorbed by soil particles when many are affected. The unaffected sand particle does not have this coating meaning that water can infiltrate through the sandy soil.

Other important soil water averting factors have been found to include soil texture, microbiology, soil surface roughness, soil organic matter content, soil chemical composition, acidity, soil water content, soil type, mineralogy of clay particles, and seasonal variations of the region. Soil texture plays a large role in predicting whether a soil could be water repelling as larger grained particles in the soil such as sand have smaller surface areas, making them more prone to being fully coated by hydrophobic compounds. It is much more difficult to entirely coat a silt or clay particle with more surface area, but when it does happen, the resulting water repellency of the soil is severe. As soil organic matter in the form of plant or microbial biomass decomposes, physiochemical changes can release these hydrophobic compounds into the soil as well. This, however, depends on the type of microbial activity present in the soil as it can also hinder the development of hydrophobic compounds.

== Hydrophobicity testing ==
Soil water repellence is almost always tested with the water droplet penetration time (WDPT) test first because of the simplicity of the test. This test is executed by recording the time it takes for one droplet of water to infiltrate a specific soil, indicating the stability of repellency. Water infiltration is expressed as water entering the soil in a spontaneous fashion and correlates with the angle of the water-soil contact. If the water-soil contact angle is greater than 90º, then the soil is determined to be hydrophobic. It has also been observed that if the test droplet is placed on hydrophobic soil, it will rapidly develop a particulate skin before disappearing.

Results of the WDPT:

Penetration time of water droplet	Classification
Less than 5 seconds	Soil is not water repellent
5 seconds to 1 minute	Soil is slightly repellent
1 to 10 minutes	Soil is water repellent
More than 10 minutes	Soil is severely repellent

Table 1: Characterizing the degree of hydrophobicity in soils based on the water droplet penetration test.

Another method for determining soil water repellency is the molarity of ethanol droplet (MED) test. The MED test uses solutions of ethanol of varying surface tensions to observe soil wetting within a time frame of 10 seconds. If there is no wetting within the specified timeframe, an aqueous solution of ethanol with lower surface tension is then placed on a different area of the sample. The results of the MED test depend on the molarity of the ethanol solution whose droplets were absorbed in the allotted 10 seconds. Classifying soil water repellency from this test can be done by using a MED index where a non-water repellent soil has an index of less than or equal to 1 and a severely water repellent soil has an index of greater than or equal to 2.2. The MED index, 90º surface tension, ethanol molarity, and volume percentage correlate and can be converted into one another. In this test, the liquid-air surface tension value of the ethanol solution that is absorbed within this timeframe is used as the ninety-degree surface tension of the soil. The water entry pressure associated with the tested soil is another indicator of infiltration rates as it is associated with the degree of water repellency along with soil pore size.

== Effect on agriculture and ecosystems ==
Hydrophobic soils and their aversion to water have consequences on plant water availability, plant-available nutrients, hydrology, and geomorphology of the affected area. By reducing the infiltration rate, runoff generation time is reduced and leads to an increase in the land flow of water during precipitation or irrigation events. Greater runoff increases erosion, causes uneven wetting patterns in soil, accelerates nutrient leaching reducing soil fertility, develops different flow paths in the region, and increases the risk of contamination in soils.

Drainage of nutrients occurs in weaker areas of repellency in hydrophobic soil where water preferentially drains into the soil. Because the water cannot drain into the stronger areas of hydrophobicity, the water finds pathways of preferential flow where it can infiltrate deeper into the soil profile. If irrigation or precipitation events are large, the water could potentially flow below the root zone, making it unavailable to any plant life and oftentimes taking fertilizers and nutrients with it. This additionally leads to an uneven distribution of nutrients and applied chemicals resulting in patchy vegetation.

In an agricultural setting, hydrophobic soil is a large constraint on crop yields. For example, in Australia, there have been documented reports of up to 80% loss in production due to soil water repellency. This is due to low rates of seed germination in soils as well as low plant available water levels.

== Locations and appearance of hydrophobic soils ==
Hydrophobic soils have been found on all continents except for Antarctica. It occurs in dry regions in the United States, southern Australia, and the Mediterranean Basin, and in wet regions including Sweden, the Netherlands, British Columbia, and Columbia. Although it mainly appears in coarse-textured soils such as sand-dominated soils, it affects soils of all different soil types and has been reported in forests, pastures, agricultural plots, and shrublands. Generally, the degree of hydrophobicity is more severe in the soils of legume-grass pastures compared to cultivated agricultural fields.

== Hydrophobic soil management ==
One method of managing sandy water-repellent soil is claying. This is done by adding select clay materials, such as calcium-bentonite, to give the soil more surface area per unit volume and improve soil mineralogy supporting aggregation. A hydrophobic barley field increased crop yield from 1.7 to 3.4 t/ha, and a field of lupins increased the yield by 1 t/ha within 2 years of claying.

Liming is a method to reduce soil water repellency in acidic soils. The liming process consists of adding calcium carbonate, which increases the pH of the soil towards neutral. Separate from hydrophobic soils, increased calcium and pH are associated with increased infiltration from improved structure and aggregation in biologically active soils.

Increasing the soil's pH increases the ability of naturally occurring humic substances to improve infiltration in hydrophobic soils. Humic acid is only water-soluble at a pH greater than 6.5, while fulvic acid is soluble at all pH ranges. Both resident acids have a property that enables them to reduce the surface tension of water when in solution. In contrast, it has been reported that soils with a deficiency of fulvic acid in solution would have more severe water repellency.

The agricultural practice of tilling decreases the degree of soil water repellency. Tilling crop fields reduces the carbon content of the soil through mixing and mineralization, thus decreasing the likelihood of decomposition by microorganisms that can lead to the dispersal of the hydrophobic coating that triggers soil water repellency.

Naturally forming holes and cracks in hydrophobic soil patches allow water to infiltrate the surface. These can form from burrowing animals, root channels, or macropores from decayed roots. These macropores have been identified as essential pathways in forest ecosystems for water to penetrate the soil because they account for approximately 35% of the near-surface volume of the soil.
