= Keyline =

Line that separates color and monochromatic areas

A keyline, in graphic design, is a boundary line that separates color and monochromatic areas or differently colored areas of printing on a given page or other printed piece. The line itself, usually consisting of a black (or other dark colored) border, provides an area in which lighter colors can be printed with slight variation in registration. In traditional paste-up graphics workflows, keylines for cropping were often merely indicated on original artwork, and then images were stripped into the area manually with the keylines themselves being added as part of the process. Keylines are often included when printing something that will be cut out using a die form, requires folding, or uses perforation lines.

Per the International Paper's Pocket Pal (18th ed., printed in 2000), keyline is defined as being "in artwork, an outline drawing of finished art to indicate the exact shape, position, and size for elements such as halftones, line sketches, etc."
