= Root invasion =

Root invasion is the incursion of plant roots with undesirable impacts.

== Biological ==
When the roots of neighboring plants or trees invade the area of other plants there will be decline in the health and eventual wasting of the plant whose space is being invaded. In planted areas, periodical inspection during planting and care can allow for the discovery and removal of invading roots.

== Plumbing ==
As plant roots spread in the search for nutrition, they will opportunistically enter irrigation or sewer with resulting line blockage. 5% of sewer line blockage is attributed to root invasion, though reports of line breakage due to the intrusion are rare. Clay and concrete pipes are more likely to be invaded then PVC pipe, with pipe joints being the typical mode of entry for roots.

== Structural ==
Roads, sidewalks and foundations can all suffer structural issues from tree roots. Several methods of control have been attempted, from barriers to encouraging growth in desirable directs. Selection of plants with root systems that will not conflict with nearby structures is the most effective method of damage control.
