= Ericaceous fertilizer =

Type of fertilizer that is high in acidity

Ericaceous fertilizer is a type of fertilizer that is high in acidity. It is used on plants from the plant family Ericaceae (Azaleas and Blueberries for example) which thrive in an acidic soil.
