= Ericaceous bed =

Acidic garden soil

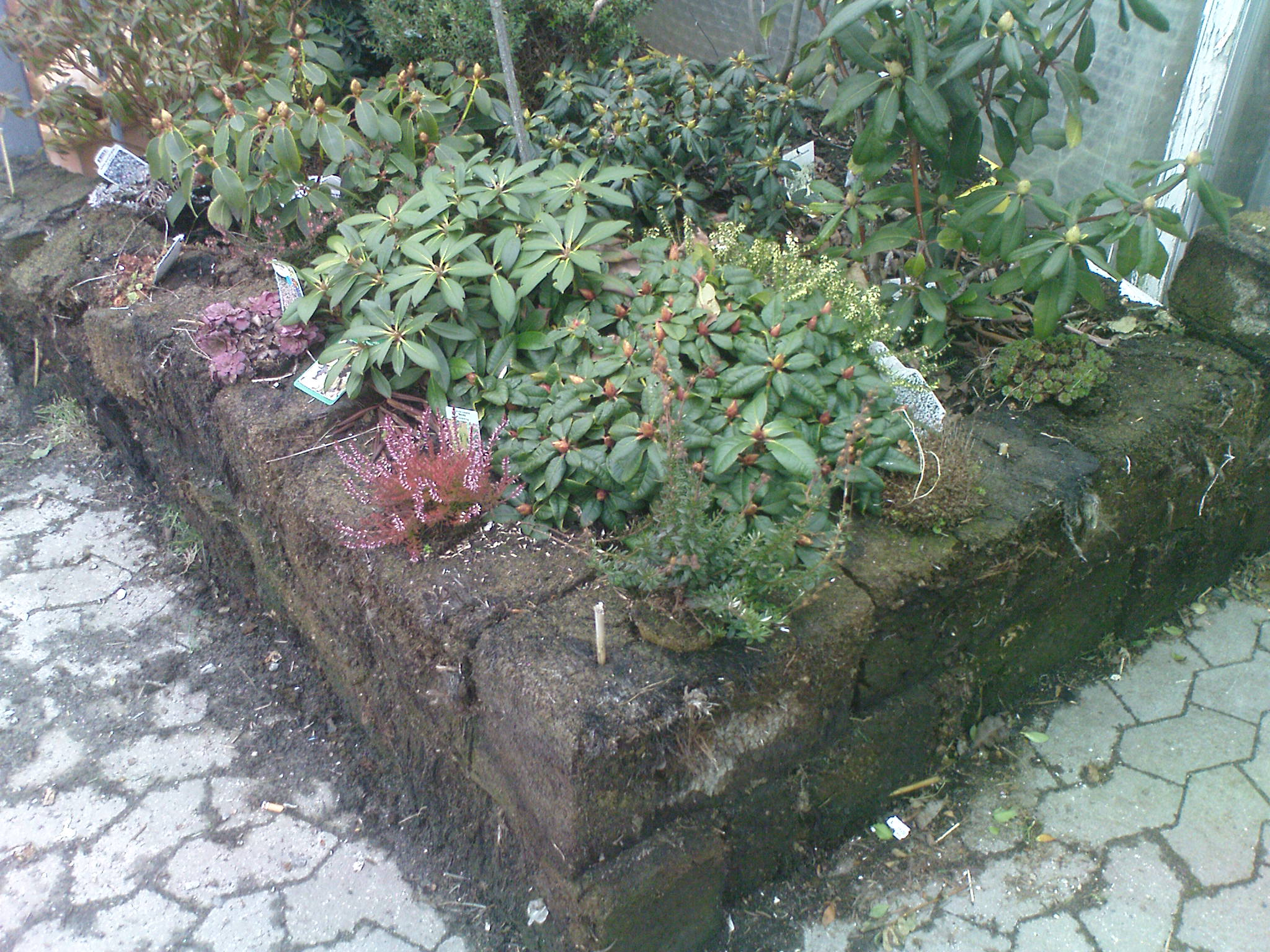
Ericaceous bed made from peat blocks

An ericaceous bed is a bed (or garden) with acidic and often nutrient-poor soil such as ericaceous compost and different types of peat. The pH of the soil is typically between 4.5 and 6. The purpose is to grow a number of garden plants which require (or thrive best in) acidic soil. Such plants commonly include heathers (Erica, Calluna, rhododendrons and camellias). Another group of plants common in ericaceous beds are those belonging to the boreal coniferous forest, e.g. Vaccinium (blueberries). A number of orchids also grow well in nutrient-poor soil. Ericaceous fertilizer can be applied to plants that require acidic, but not nutrient-poor, soil.

Botanically, plants with ericoid mycorrhizas grow successfully on mor humus soils in which low pH and high organic acid levels combine to exclude many other species. The mycorrhiza facilitates the growth of the ericaceous plants, mainly by selectively de-toxifying the environment.
