= Method of lines =

Numerical method

Method of lines - the example, which shows the origin of the name of method.

The method of lines (MOL, NMOL, NUMOL) is a technique for solving partial differential equations (PDEs) in which all but one dimension is discretized. By reducing a PDE to a single continuous dimension, the method of lines allows solutions to be computed via methods and software developed for the numerical integration of ordinary differential equations (ODEs) and differential-algebraic systems of equations (DAEs). Many integration routines have been developed over the years in many different programming languages, and some have been published as open source resources.

The method of lines most often refers to the construction or analysis of numerical methods for partial differential equations that proceeds by first discretizing the spatial derivatives only and leaving the time variable continuous. This leads to a system of ordinary differential equations to which a numerical method for initial value ordinary equations can be applied. The method of lines in this context dates back to at least the early 1960s. Many papers discussing the accuracy and stability of the method of lines for various types of partial differential equations have appeared since.

== Application to elliptic equations ==
MOL requires that the PDE problem is well-posed as an initial value (Cauchy) problem in at least one dimension, because ODE and DAE integrators are initial value problem (IVP) solvers. Thus it cannot be used directly on purely elliptic partial differential equations, such as Laplace's equation. However, MOL has been used to solve Laplace's equation by using the method of false transients. In this method, a time derivative of the dependent variable is added to Laplace’s equation. Finite differences are then used to approximate the spatial derivatives, and the resulting system of equations is solved by MOL. It is also possible to solve elliptical problems by a semi-analytical method of lines. In this method, the discretization process results in a set of ODE's that are solved by exploiting properties of the associated exponential matrix.

Recently, to overcome the stability issues associated with the method of false transients, a perturbation approach was proposed which was found to be more robust than standard method of false transients for a wide range of elliptic PDEs.
