= Keyline design =

Landscaping to optimize water usage

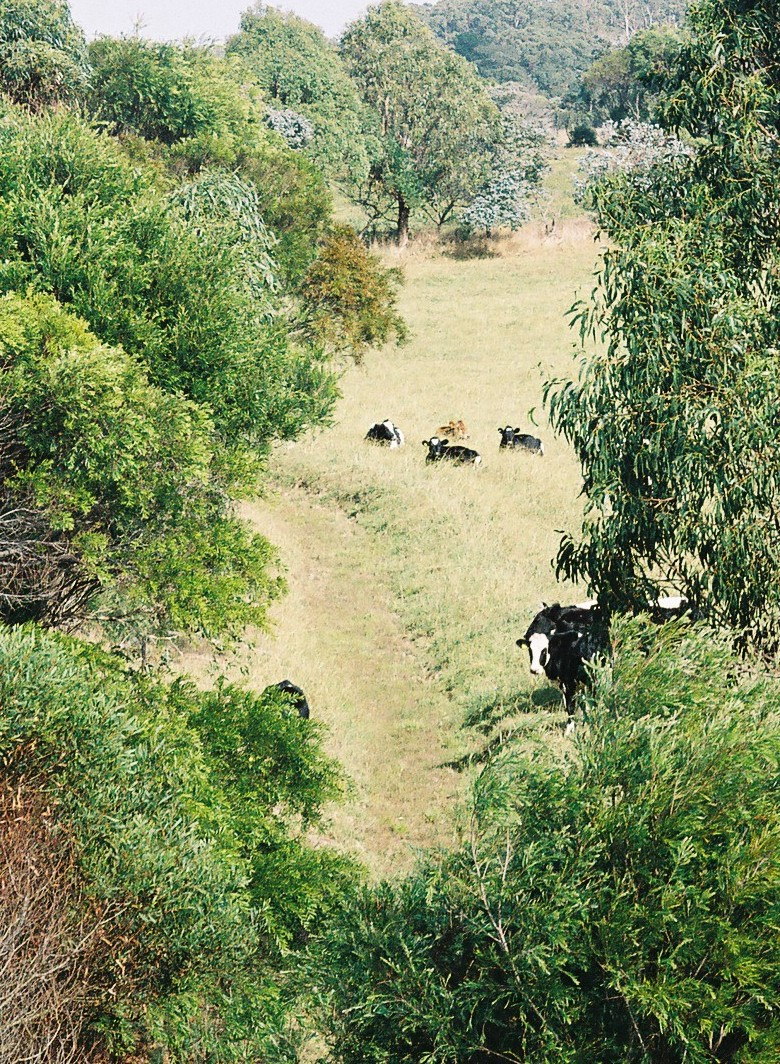
A keyline irrigation channel in Orana, Australia

Keyline design is a landscaping technique of maximizing the beneficial use of the water resources of a tract of land. The "keyline" is a specific topographic feature related to the natural flow of water on the tract. Keyline design is a system of principles and techniques of developing rural and urban landscapes to optimize use of their water resources.

Australian farmer and engineer P. A. Yeomans invented and developed Keyline design in his books The Keyline Plan, The Challenge of Landscape, Water For Every Farm, and The City Forest.

== Application ==
P. A. Yeomans published the first book on Keyline design in 1954. Yeomans described a system of amplified contour ripping to control rainfall runoff and enable fast flood irrigation of undulating land without the need for terracing it.

Keyline designs include irrigation dams equipped with through-the-wall lockpipe systems, gravity feed irrigation, stock water, and yard water. Graded earthen channels may be interlinked to broaden the catchment areas of high dams, conserve the height of water, and transfer rainfall runoff into the most efficient high dam sites. Roads follow both ridge lines and water channels to provide easier movement across the land.

== Keyline Scale of Permanence ==
The foundation of Yeomans' Keyline design system is the Keyline Scale of Permanence (KSOP), which was the outcome of 15 years of adaptive experimentation on his properties Yobarnie and Nevallan. The Scale identifies the environmental elements of typical farms and orders them according to their degree of permanence as follows:

- Climate
- Landshape (topography)
- Water supply
- Roads and means of access
- Trees
- Structures (edifices)
- Subdivisional fences
- Soil

Keyline design considers these elements in planning the placement of water storage features, roads, trees, edifices, and fences. On undulating land, keyline design involves identifying ridges, valleys, and natural water courses and designing with them in mind in order to optimize water storage sites. Constructing interconnecting channels may be part of such optimization.

The identified natural water lines delineate the possible locations for the various less permanent elements, e. g. roads, fences, trees, and edifices, which if so located would help optimize the natural potential of the land in question.

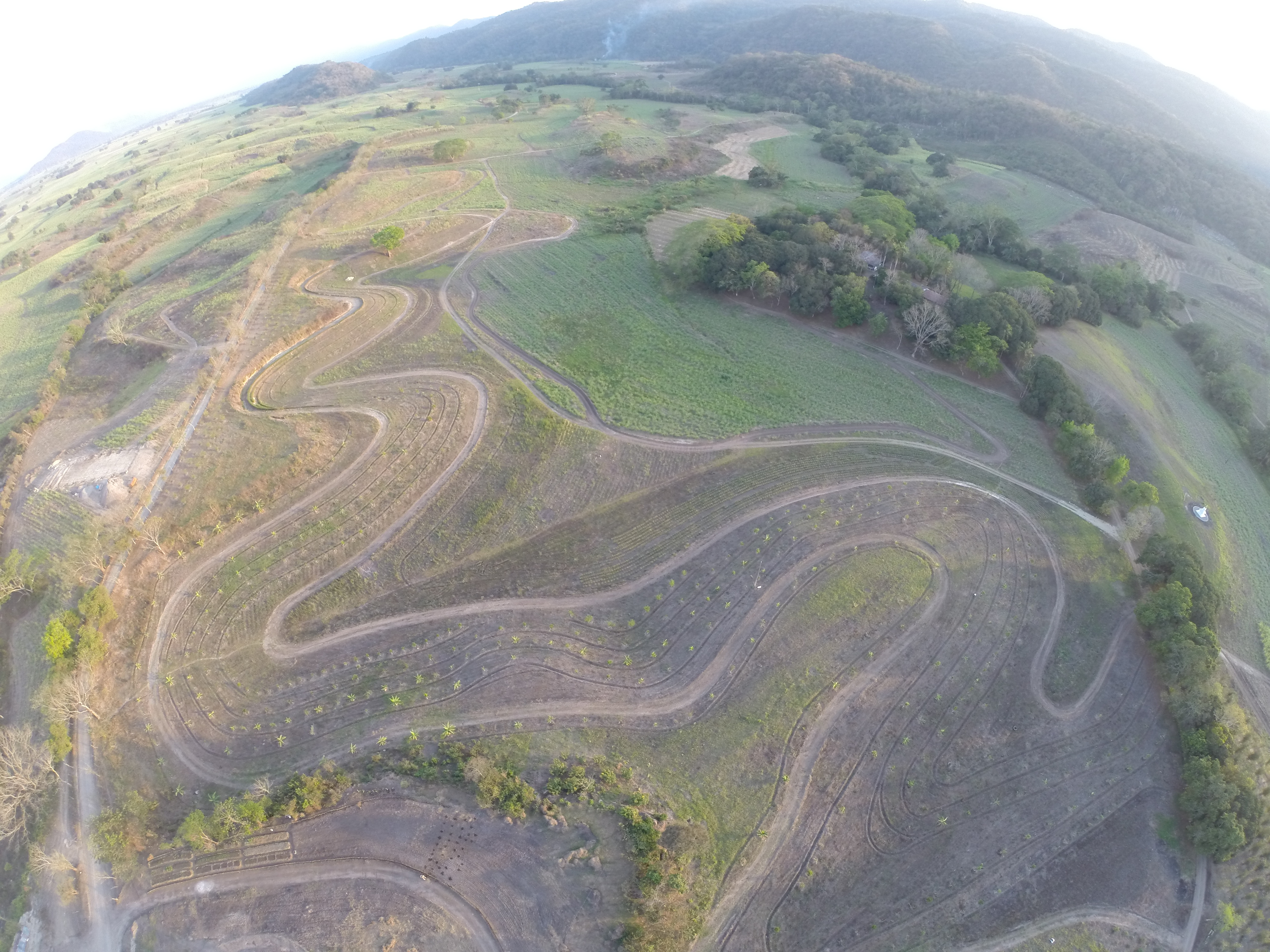
Rancho San Ricardo, Oaxaca, México

== Keypoint ==
In a smooth, grassy valley, a location designated the keypoint is identified at which the lower and more level portion of the primary valley floor suddenly steepens higher. The keyline of this primary valley is determined by pegging a contour line that conforms to the natural shape of the valley through the keypoint, such that all points on the keyline are at the same elevation as the keypoint. Contour plowing both above and below the keyline and parallel to it is necessarily "off-contour", but the developing pattern tends to drift rainwater runoff away from the center of the valley and, incidentally, prevent erosion of its soil.

Cultivation conforming to Keyline design for ridges is carried out parallel to any suitable contour, but only on the high side of the contour's guide line. This process develops a pattern of off-contour cultivation in which all the rip marks made in the soil slope down toward the center of the ridge. This pattern of cultivation allows more time for water to infiltrate. Cultivation following the Keyline pattern also enables controlled flood irrigation of undulating land, which increases the rate of development of deep, fertile soil.

In many nations, including Australia, it is important to optimize the infiltration of rainfall, and Keyline cultivation accomplishes this while delaying the concentration of runoff that could damage the land. Yeomans' technique differs from traditional contour plowing in several important respects. Random contour plowing also becomes off-contour but usually with the opposite effect on runoff, namely causing it to quickly run off ridges and concentrate in valleys. The limitations of the traditional system of soil conservation, with its "safe disposal" approach to farm water, was an important motivation to develop Keyline design.

== Applications ==
David Holmgren, one of the founders of permaculture, used Yeoman's Keyline design extensively in the formulation of his principles of permaculture and the design of sustainable human settlements and organic farms.

Darren J. Doherty has extensive global experience in Keyline design, development, management, and education. He uses Keyline as the basis for his Regrarians framework, which he considers a revision and synthesis of Keyline design, permaculture, holistic management, and several other innovative, human ecological frameworks into a coherent process-based system of design and management of regenerative economies.

A topographical example of Keyline design is available at (37.159154°S 144.252248°E).

Keyline design also includes principles of rapidly enhancing soil fertility. They are explored in Priority One by P. A. Yeomans' son, Allan. Yeomans and his sons were also instrumental in the design and production of special plows and other equipment for Keyline cultivation.

== Further Development: Seepage Line System ==
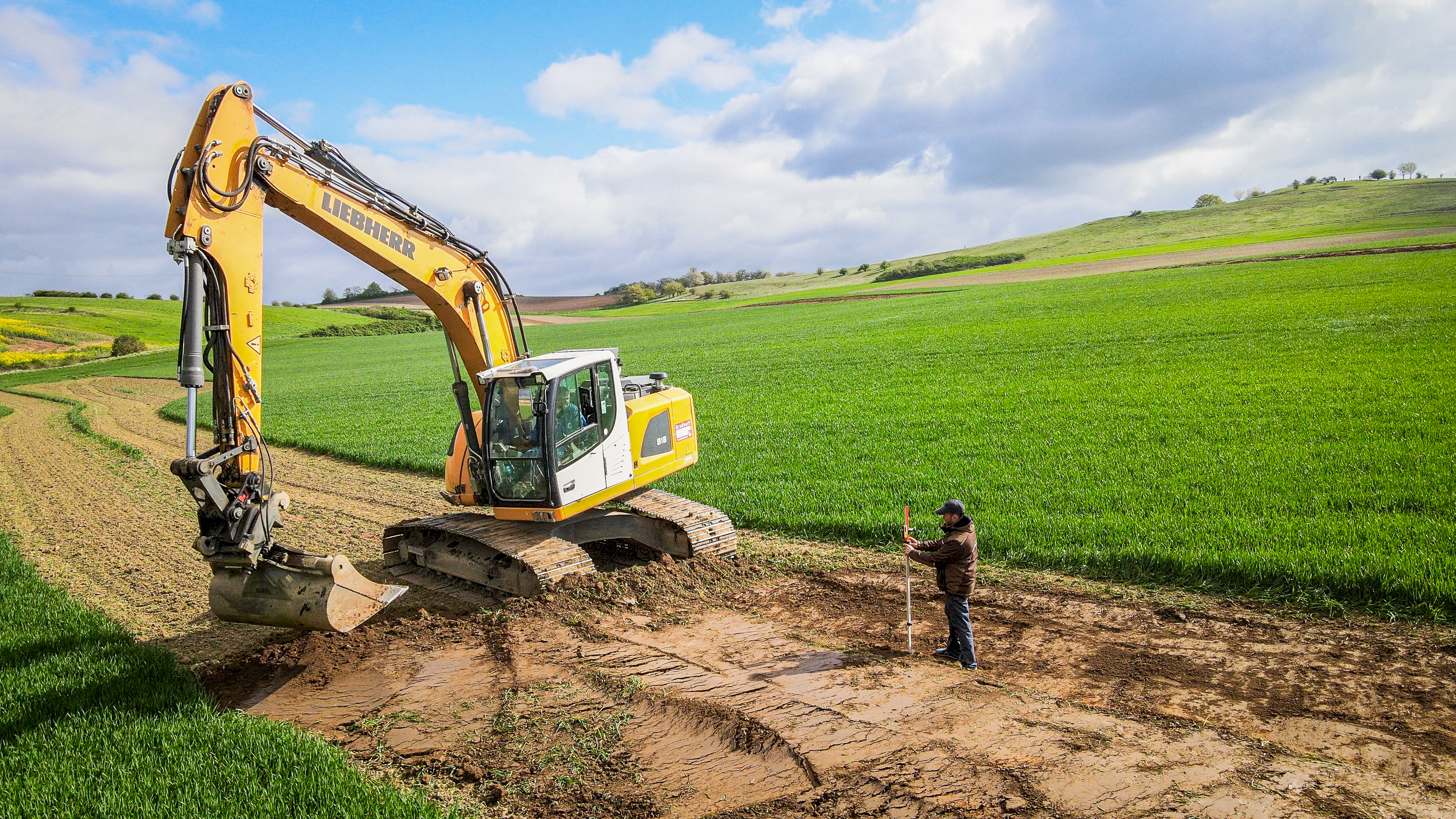
Seepage Line System by Dr. Philipp Gerhardt, developed as an evolution of the Keyline concept. Photo: Schreiber farm, Neindorf, Germany.

An important evolution of classical Keyline Design has been introduced by German agronomist Dr. Philipp Gerhardt (b. 1983). Based on field experience, Gerhardt observed that traditional keylines often fail to manage increasingly frequent heavy rainfall and can interfere with modern farm operations. In response, he developed the Seepage Line System, a flexible, iterative approach that replaces fixed keylines with custom-shaped contour ditches, tailored to site-specific topography.

These individually designed lines enhance water infiltration, reduce erosion, and allow for overflow management during extreme weather. The system also integrates well with agroforestry and parallel tillage, helping maintain operational efficiency.

German federal agencies have recognized this adaptation as a valuable tool for climate-resilient land use. It is promoted for its ability to improve soil moisture retention, limit erosion, and buffer the effects of droughts and heavy rains.

The system has been applied by farms such as Schreiber GbR in northern Germany and is being explored in other regions. Research and field trials in Lower Saxony and Hesse confirm its effectiveness in reducing surface runoff and supporting water-retentive agroforestry systems.

Documented benefits include improved integration of tree crops, enhanced water retention, and more stable yields under climate stress.

== See also ==
- Conservation biology
- Conservation ethic
- Conservation movement
- Contour farming
- Ecology
- Environmentalism
- Environmental protection
- Habitat conservation
- Keyline
- Natural environment
- Natural capital
- Natural resource
- Nicholas Burtner
- Renewable resource
- Sustainable agriculture
- Sustainability
- Water conservation
- Soil salination
