= Hurura =

River in the Tembien highlands of Ethiopia

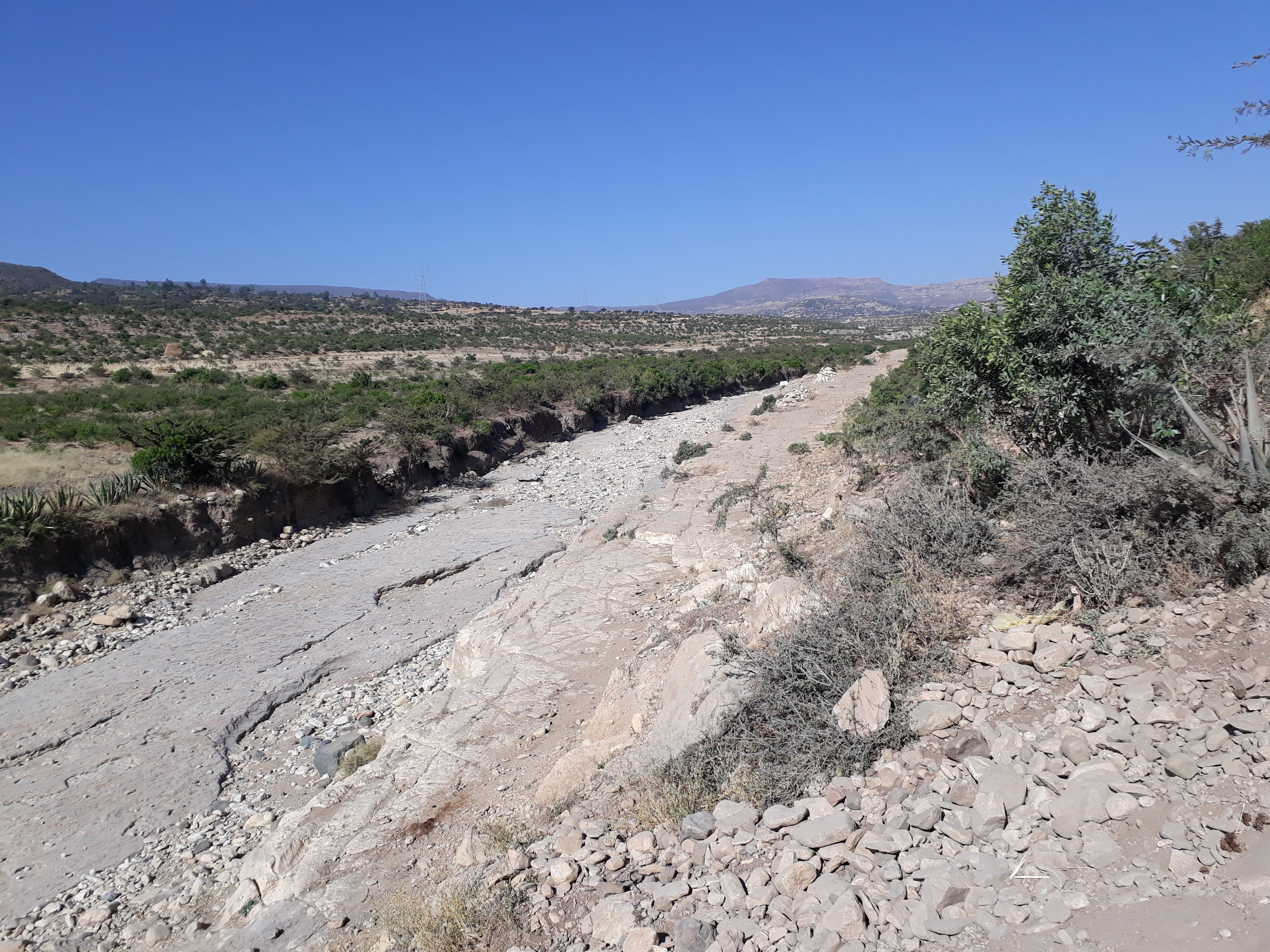
- The Hurura River at Tukhul

- Hurura River in Dogu’a Tembien

Location
- Country: Ethiopia
- Region: Tigray Region
- District (woreda): Dogu’a Tembien

Physical characteristics
- Source
  - location: Tegula’i in Haddinnet municipality
  - elevation: 2,475 m (8,120 ft)
- Mouth: Giba River
  - location: Tahtay Qarano in Addi Azmera municipality
  - coordinates: 13.581°N 39.371°E
  - elevation: 1,740 m (5,710 ft)
- Length: 22 km (14 mi)
- Width
  - average: 20 m (66 ft)

Basin features
- Progression: Giba→ Tekezé→ Atbarah→ Nile→ Mediterranean Sea
- River system: Seasonal/permanent river
- Tributaries
  - left: Shimbula
  - right: Afedena River, May Ayni
- Bridges: West of Tukhul
- Topography: Mountains and deep gorges

The Hurura is a river of the Nile basin. Rising in the mountains of Dogu’a Tembien in northern Ethiopia, it flows southwestward to empty in the Giba and finally in Tekezé River.

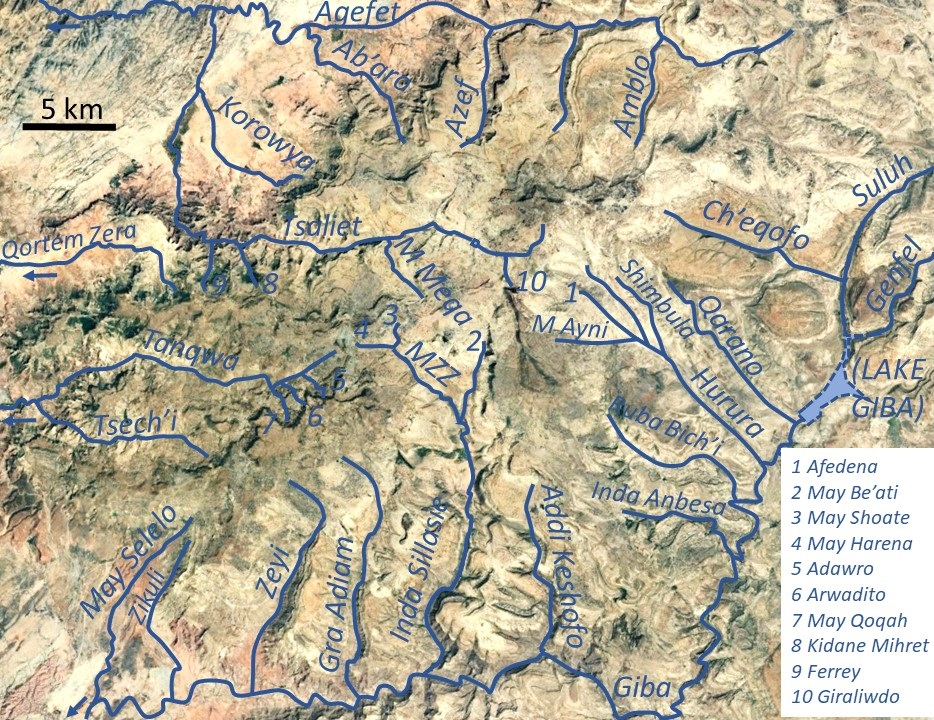
The river in the radial drainage network of Dogu’a Tembien

== Characteristics ==
It is a confined ephemeral river, locally meandering in its narrow alluvial plain, with an average slope gradient of 33 metres per kilometre. With its tributaries, the Hurura has cut a deep gorge.

== Flash floods and flood buffering ==
Runoff mostly happens in the form of high runoff discharge events that occur in a very short period (called flash floods). These are related to the steep topography, often little vegetation cover and intense convective rainfall. The peaks of such flash floods have often a 50 to 100 times larger discharge than the preceding baseflow. The magnitude of floods in this river has however been decreased due to interventions in the catchment. At Afedena, Sesemat, Tukhul and on other steep slopes, exclosures have been established; the dense vegetation largely contributes to enhanced infiltration, less flooding and better baseflow. Physical conservation structures such as stone bunds and check dams also intercept runoff.

== Boulders and pebbles in the river bed ==
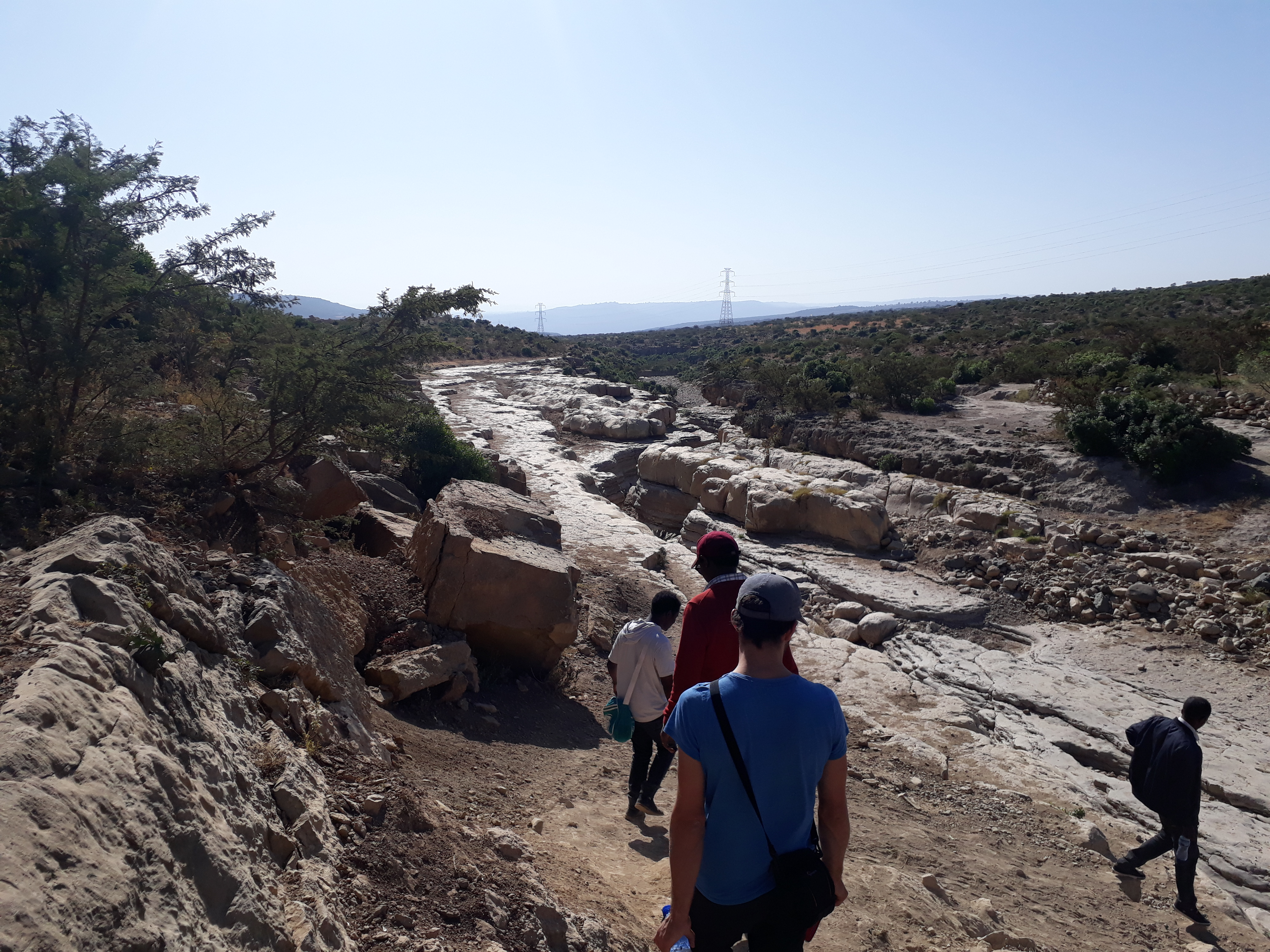
Antalo Limestone outcropping in the bed of Hurura River

Boulders and pebbles encountered in the river bed can originate from any location higher up in the catchment. In the uppermost stretches of the river, only rock fragments of the upper lithological units will be present in the river bed, whereas more downstream one may find a more comprehensive mix of all lithologies crossed by the river. From upstream to downstream, the following lithological units occur in the catchment.

- Upper basalt
- Interbedded lacustrine deposits
- Lower basalt
- Amba Aradam Formation
- Mekelle Dolerite
- Antalo Limestone
- Quaternary freshwater tufa

== Trekking along the river ==
Trekking routes have been established across and along this river. The tracks are not marked on the ground but can be followed using downloaded .GPX files. Trek 14 crosses the river near Sesemat village. In the rainy season, flash floods may occur and it is advised not to follow the river bed.

== See also ==
- List of Ethiopian rivers
