= Afedena River =

River in the Tembien highlands of Ethiopia

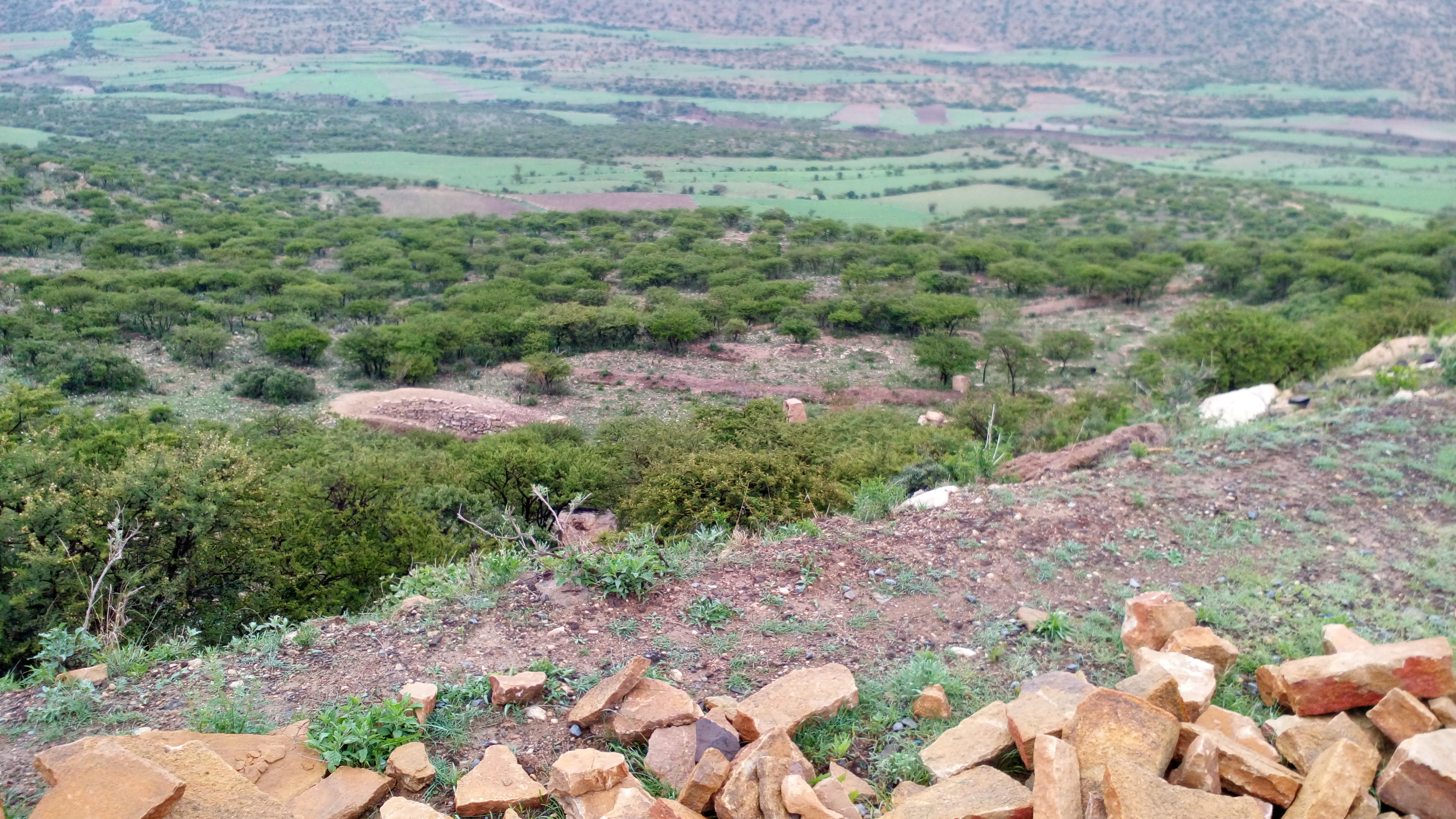
- The Afedena River at Afedena

- Afedena River in Dogu’a Tembien

Location
- Country: Ethiopia
- Region: Tigray Region
- District (woreda): Dogu’a Tembien

Physical characteristics
- Source
  - location: Imba Ra’isot in Ayninbirkekin municipality
  - elevation: 2,221 m (7,287 ft)
- Mouth: Hurura River
  - location: Tukhul in Addi Azmera municipality
  - coordinates: 13.645°N 39.314°E
  - elevation: 1,995 m (6,545 ft)
- Length: 6.5 km (4.0 mi)
- Width
  - average: 10 m (33 ft)

Basin features
- Progression: Hurura→ Giba→ Tekezé→ Atbarah→ Nile→ Mediterranean Sea
- River system: Seasonal river
- Tributaries
  - right: May Ayni
- Topography: Mountains and deep gorges

The Afedena is a river of the Nile basin. Rising in the mountains of Dogu’a Tembien in northern Ethiopia, it flows southwestward to empty finally in the Giba and Tekezé River.

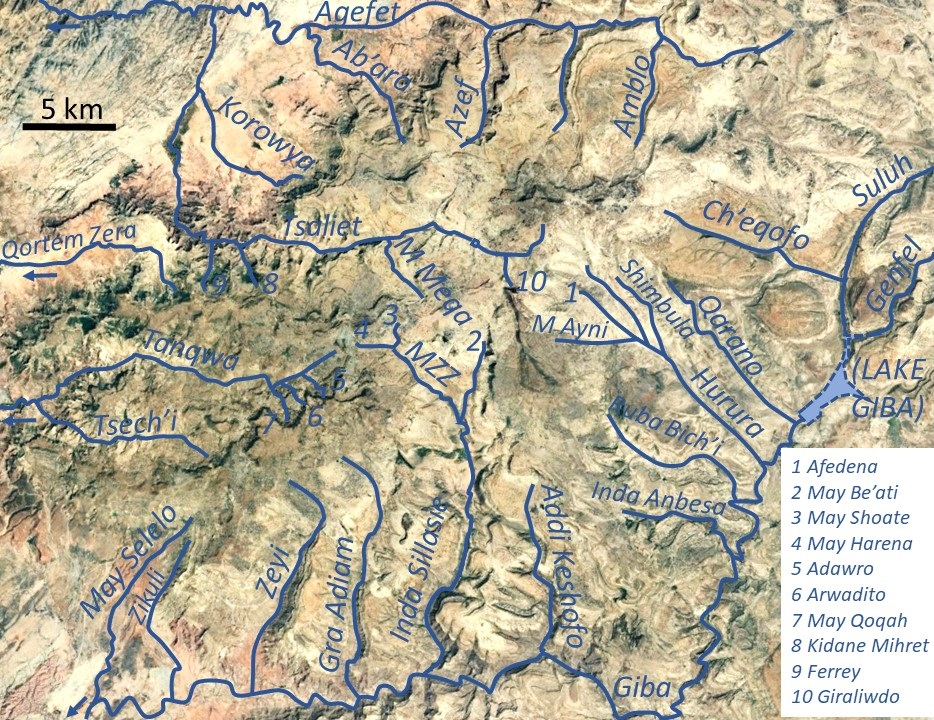
The river in the radial drainage network of Dogu’a Tembien

== Characteristics ==
The Afedena is a confined ephemeral river, locally meandering in its narrow alluvial plain, with an average slope gradient of 35 metres per kilometre. With its tributaries, the river has cut a gorge.

== Flash floods and flood buffering ==
Runoff mostly happens in the form of high runoff discharge events that occur in a very short period (called flash floods). These are related to the steep topography, often little vegetation cover and intense convective rainfall. The peaks of such flash floods have often a 50 to 100 times larger discharge than the preceding baseflow. The magnitude of floods in this river has however been decreased due to interventions in the catchment. At Afedena, exclosures have been established; the dense vegetation largely contributes to enhanced infiltration, less flooding and better baseflow. Physical conservation structures such as stone bunds and check dams also intercept runoff.

== Boulders and pebbles in the river bed ==
Boulders and pebbles encountered in the river bed can originate from any location higher up in the catchment. In the uppermost stretches of the river, only rock fragments of the upper lithological units will be present in the river bed, whereas more downstream one may find a more comprehensive mix of all lithologies crossed by the river. From upstream to downstream, the following lithological units occur in the catchment.

- Lower basalt
- Amba Aradam Formation
- Antalo Limestone
- Quaternary freshwater tufa

== See also ==
- List of Ethiopian rivers
