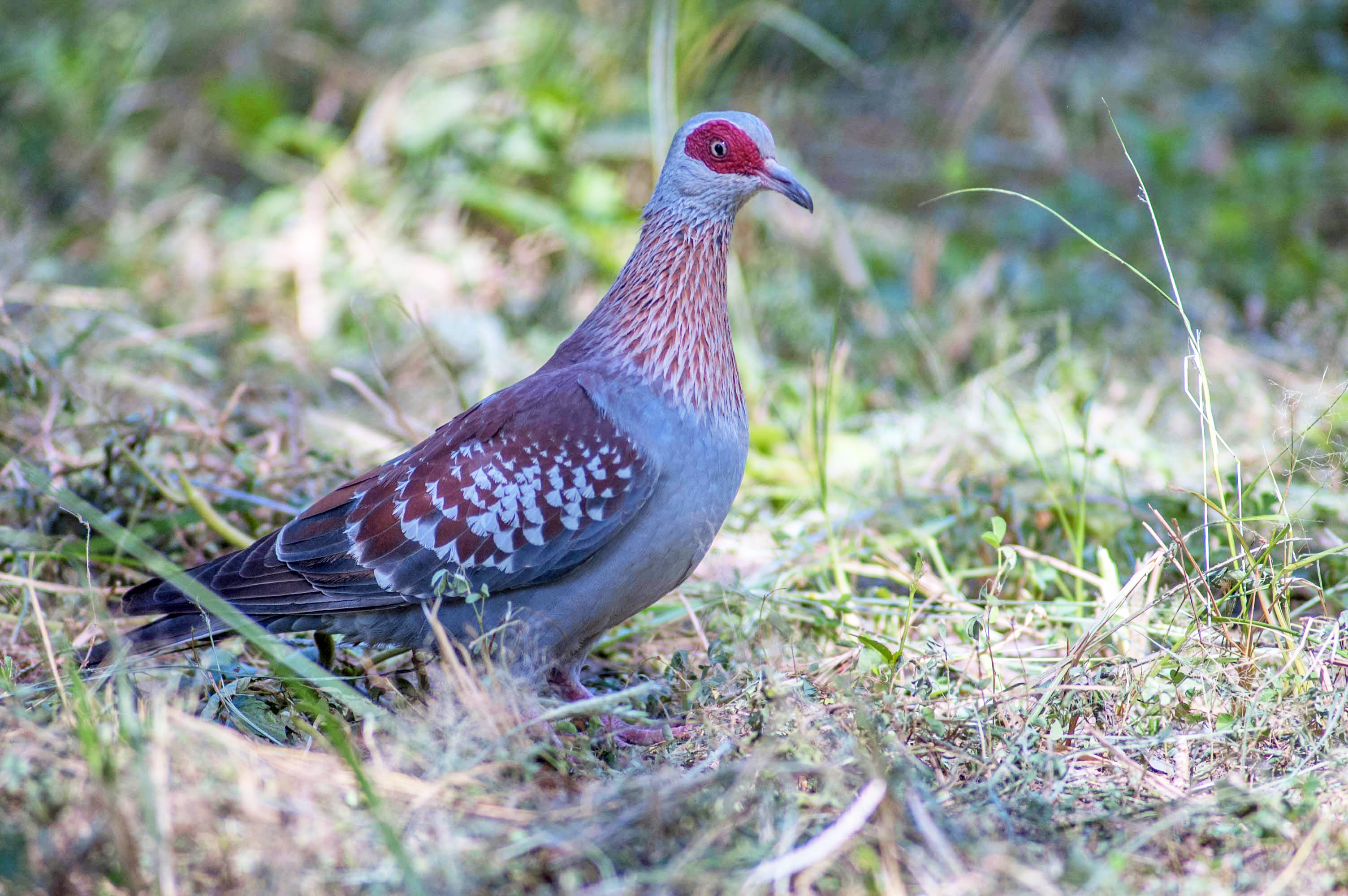
- Nominate C. g. guinea, Gambia

Conservation status
- Least Concern (IUCN 3.1)

Scientific classification
- Kingdom: Animalia
- Phylum: Chordata
- Class: Aves
- Order: Columbiformes
- Family: Columbidae
- Genus: Columba
- Species: C. guinea

Binomial name
- Columba guinea Linnaeus, 1758

= Speckled pigeon =

Species of bird

The speckled pigeon (Columba guinea), also known as the African rock pigeon or Guinea pigeon, is a pigeon that is a resident breeding bird in much of Africa south of the Sahara. It is a common and widespread species in open habitats over much of its range, although there are sizable gaps in its distribution.

== Taxonomy ==
In 1747 the English naturalist George Edwards included a description and an illustration of the speckled pigeon in the second volume of his A Natural History of Uncommon Birds. His hand-coloured etching was made from two live birds at the home of the Duke of Richmond in London. Edwards was told that the pigeons had been brought from the inland region of Guinea in West Africa. When in 1758 the Swedish naturalist Carl Linnaeus updated his Systema Naturae for the tenth edition, he placed the speckled pigeon with all the other pigeons in the genus Columba. Linnaeus included a brief description, coined the binomial name Columba guinea and cited Edwards' work.

Despite the marked differences in plumage from the rock dove C. livia, speckled pigeon is closely related to it, and in captivity will hybridise with it; the hybrid males (but not the first-generation hybrid females) are fertile. Some speckled pigeon ancestry is present in many breeds of domesticated pigeon, showing it has been used in pigeon breeding over a long period. However speckled pigeon genes are absent in natural wild rock dove populations.

There are two recognised subspecies:

- C. g. guinea Linnaeus, 1758 – Mauritania to Ethiopia south to the Democratic Republic of the Congo and northern Malawi
- C. g. phaeonota Gray, G.R., 1856 – southwestern Angola to Zimbabwe and South Africa

== Description ==
It is a medium-sized pigeon, at 32–35 cm in length similar in size to rock dove and stock dove. Its back and wings are rufous, the latter heavily speckled with white spots. The rest of the upperparts and underparts are blue-grey, and the head is grey with red patches of bare skin around the eye. The neck is brownish, streaked with white, and the legs are red. The sexes are similar, but immatures are browner than adults and lack the red eye patches. The call is a loud doo-doo-doo.

== Behaviour and ecology ==
The speckled pigeon is frequently seen around human habitation and cultivation. Most of its food is vegetable, and it gathers in large numbers where grain or groundnuts are available. This species builds a large stick nest on protected rocky outcrops and in urban areas often atop covered pergola pillars and on flat roofs under deep eaves and lays two white eggs. Its flight is quick, with regular beats and an occasional sharp flick of the wings that are characteristic of pigeons in general.

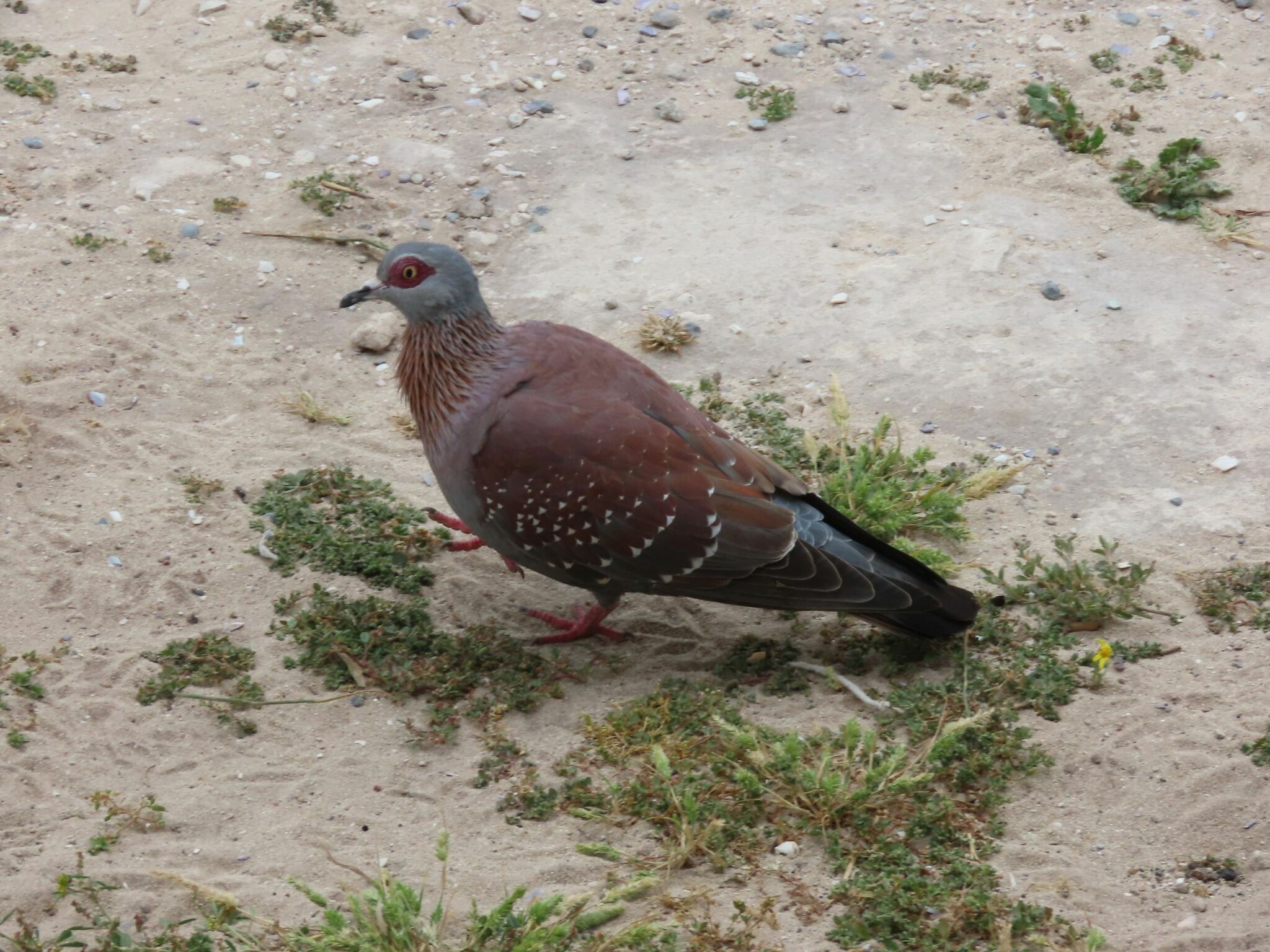
C. g. phaeonata, South Africa

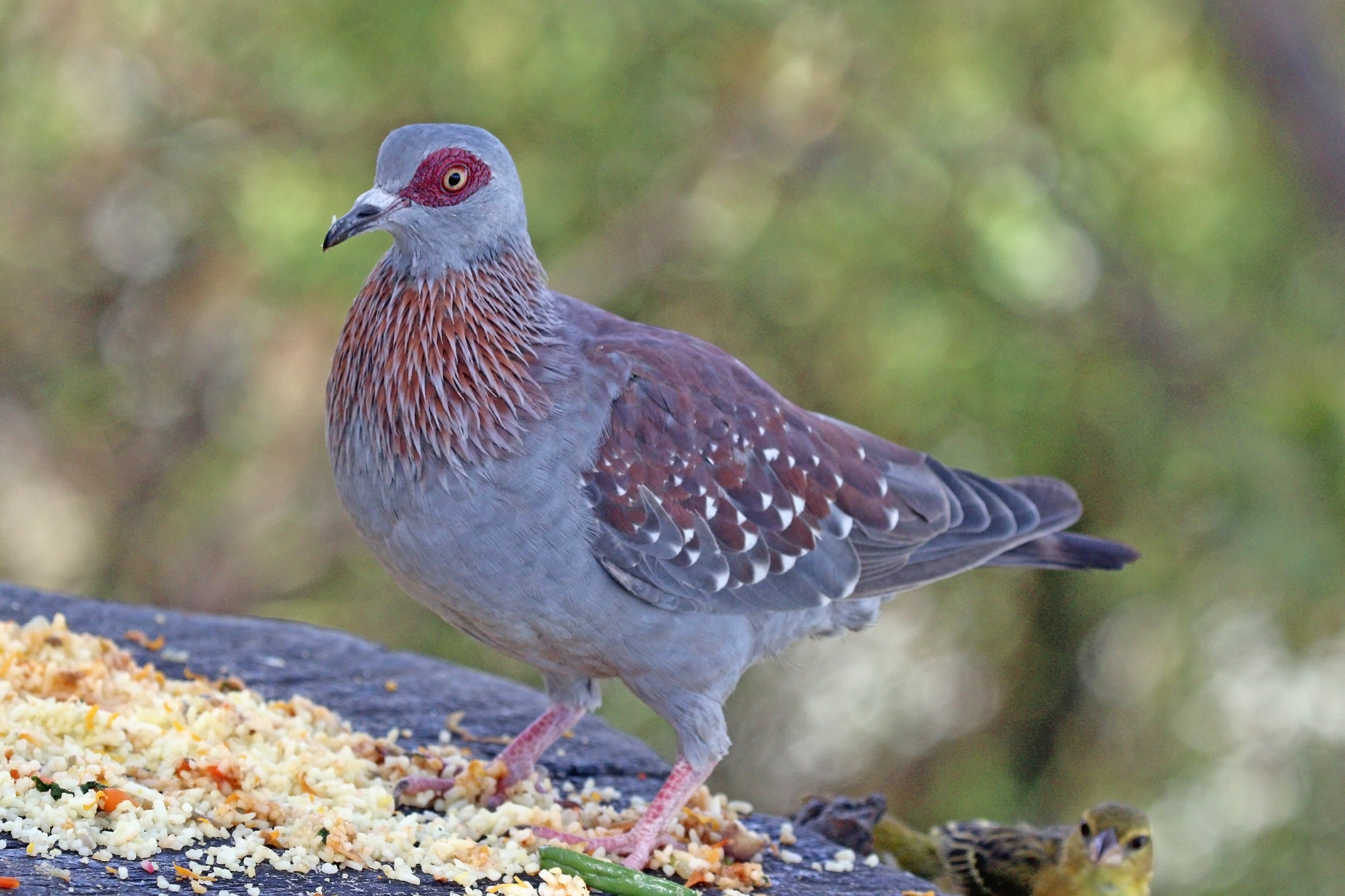
C. g. guinea, Lake Baringo, Kenya

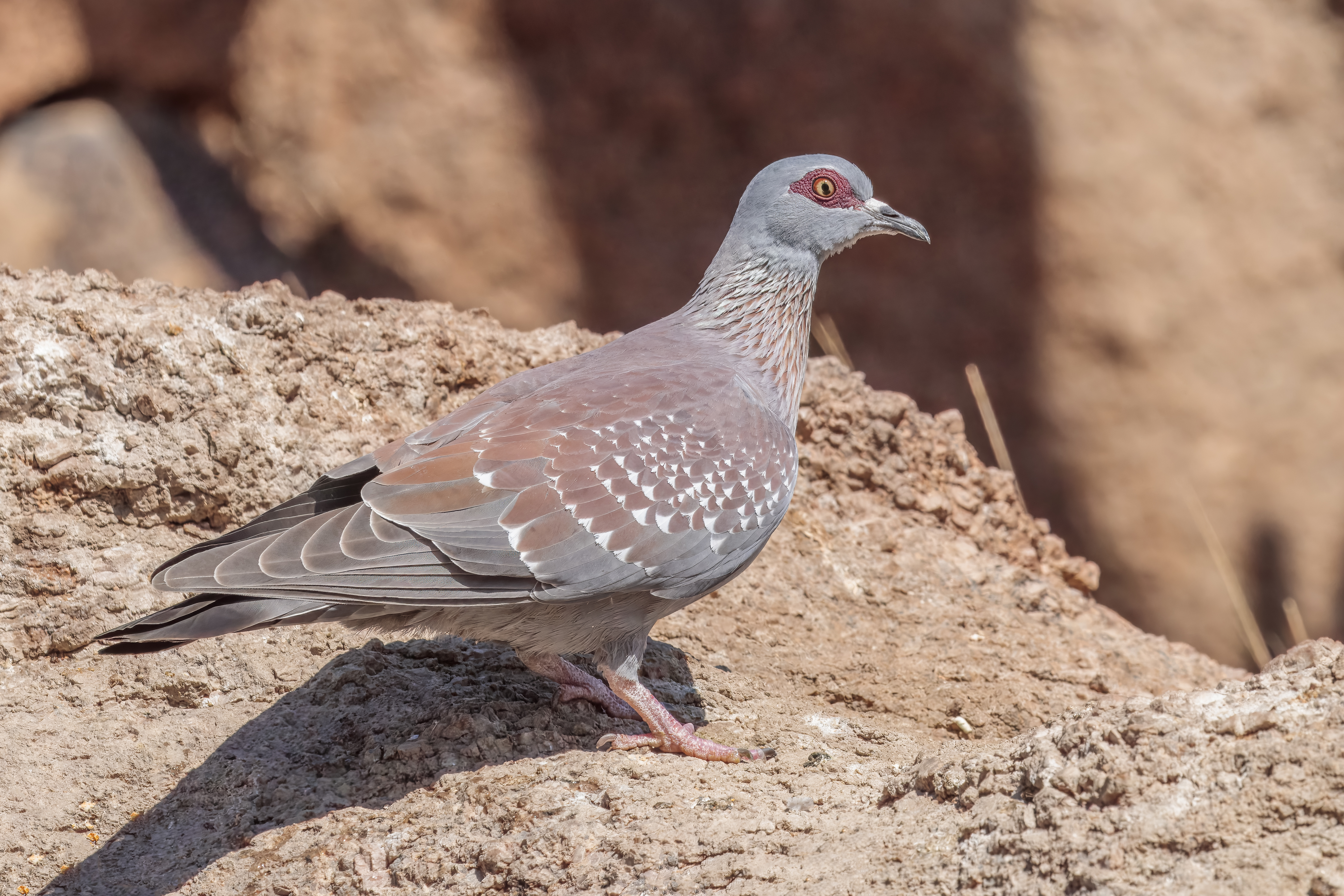
C. g. bradfieldi, Damaraland, Namibia

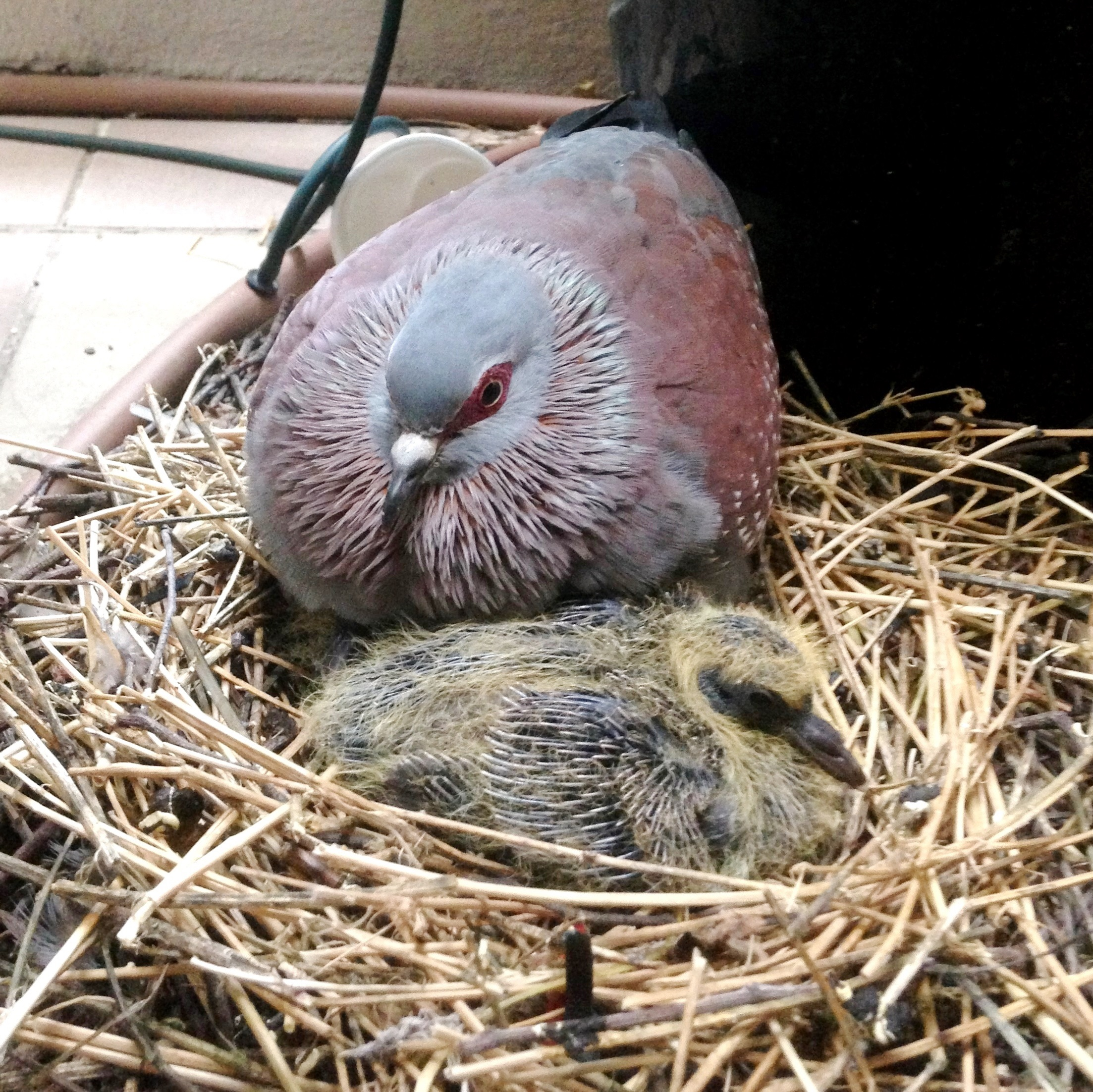
C. g. phaeonota with chick in nest, Cape Town, South Africa.

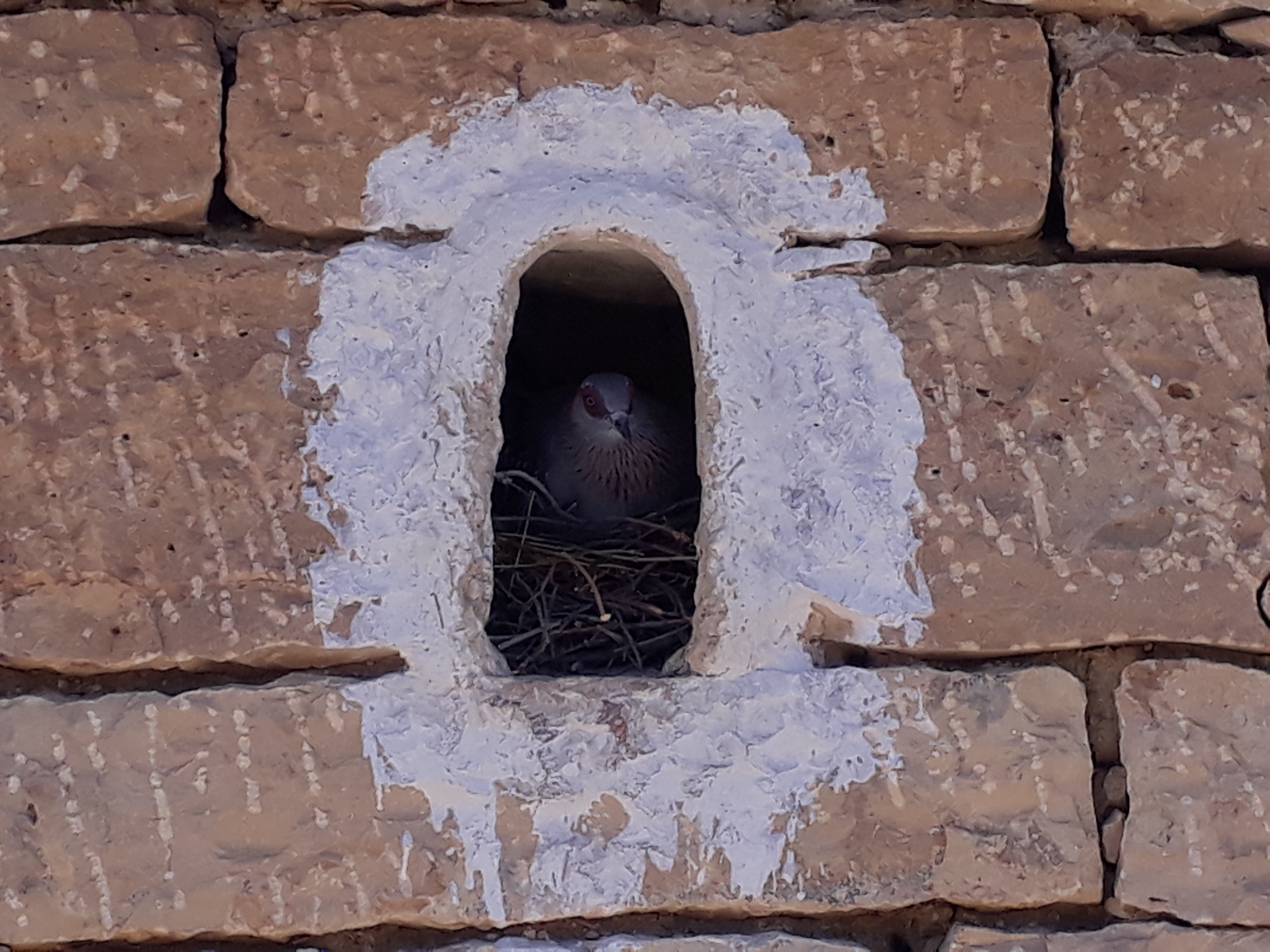
Nest box for Columba guinea in the wall of a homestead in Zerfenti, (Ethiopia)

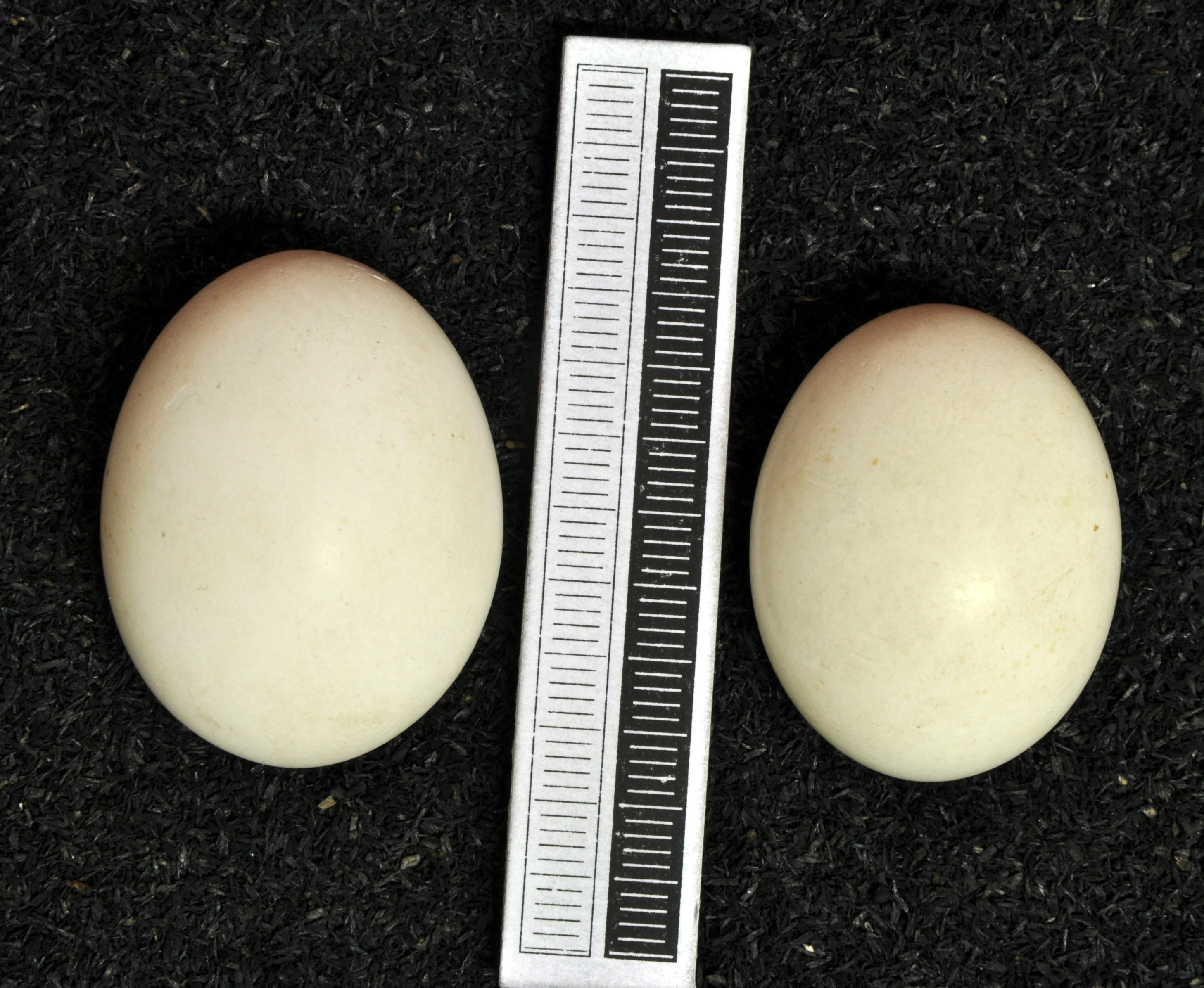
Eggs, Collection Museum Wiesbaden

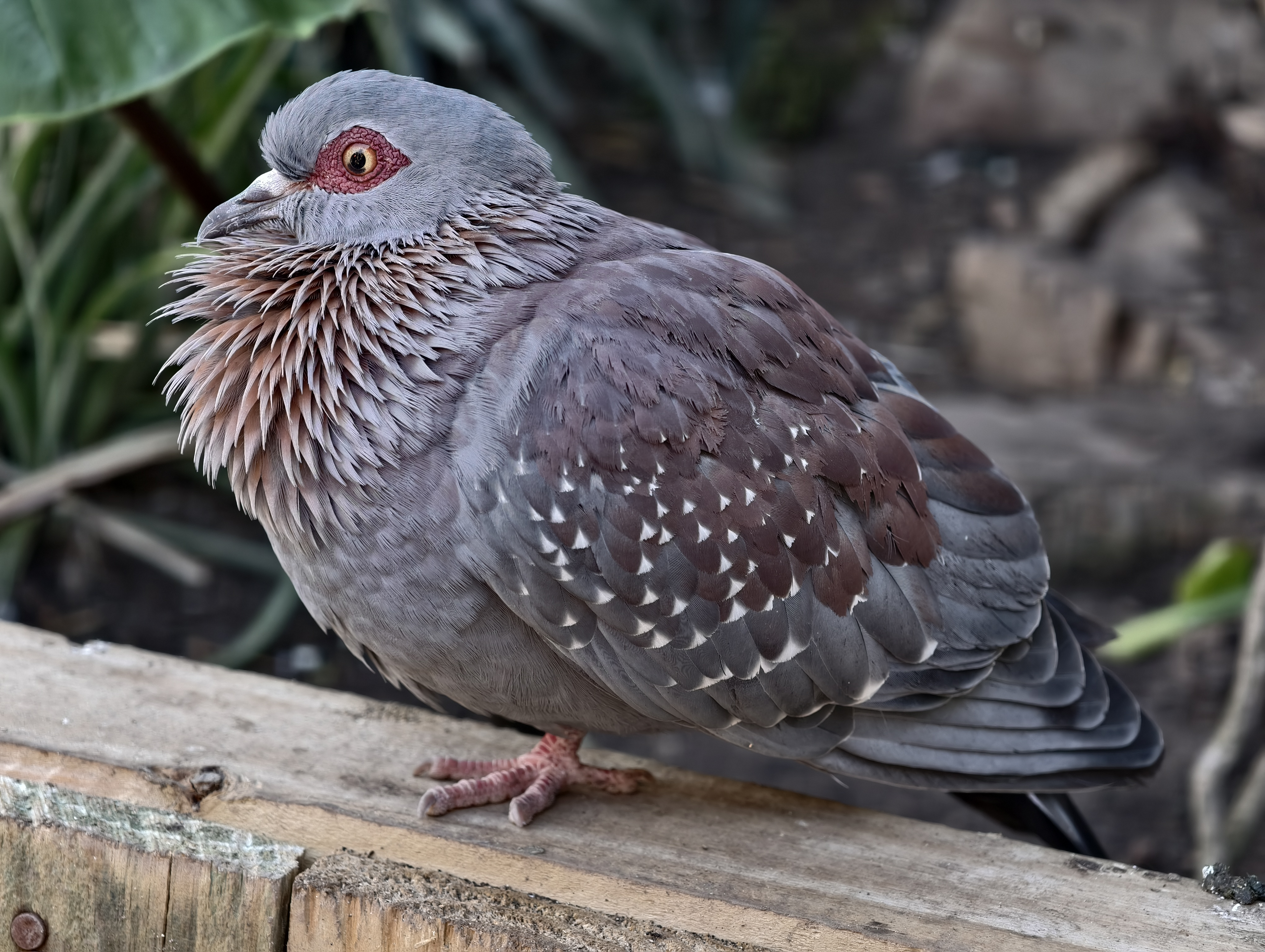
Speckled pigeon, World of Birds Wildlife Sanctuary & Monkey Park, Hout Bay, South Africa
