= Sesemat (exclosure) =

Exclosure for woodland restoration in Ethiopia

Sesemat exclosure
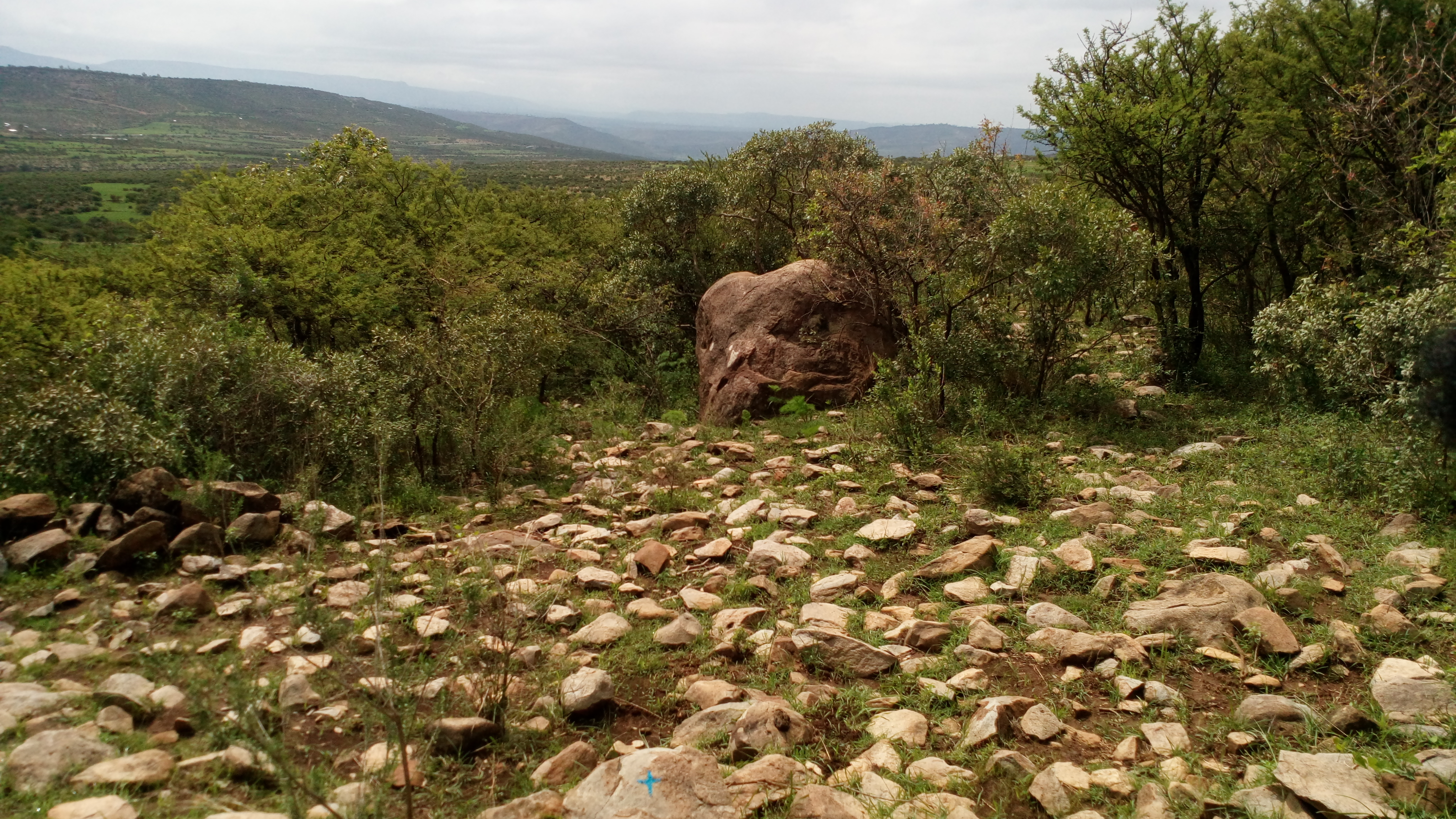
- Sesemat exclosure

- Location within Ethiopia
- Location: Addi Azmera municipality, in Dogu’a Tembien district, Ethiopia
- Nearest city: Hagere Selam
- Coordinates: 13.63°N 39.322°E
- Area: 46 ha (110 acres)
- Established: 1993
- Website: https://ethiotrees.com

Sesemat is an exclosure located in the Dogu'a Tembien woreda of the Tigray Region in Ethiopia. The area has been protected since 1993 by the local community.

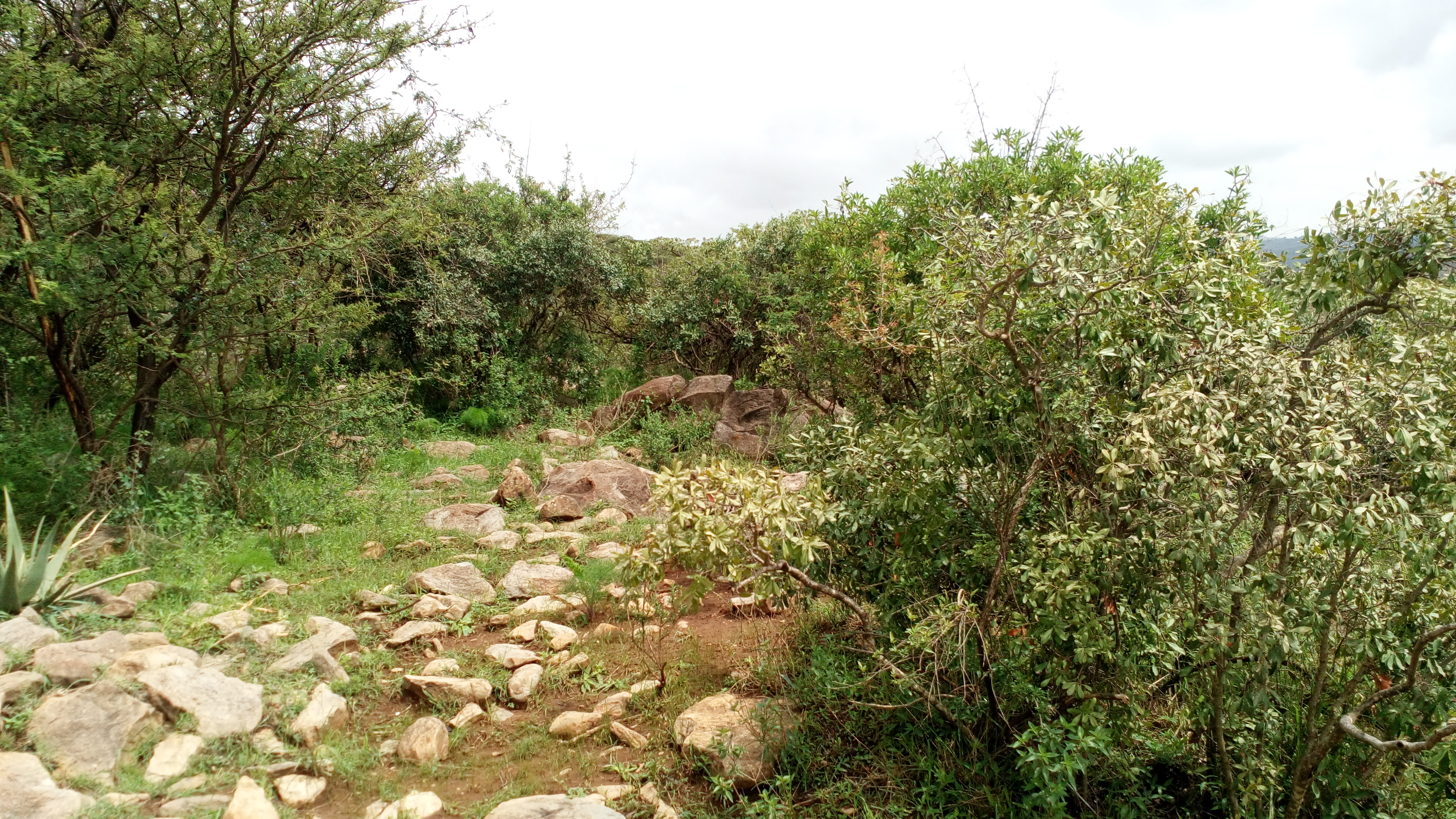
Sesemat exclosure

== Timeline ==
- 1993: established as exclosure by the community
- 2017: support by the EthioTrees project

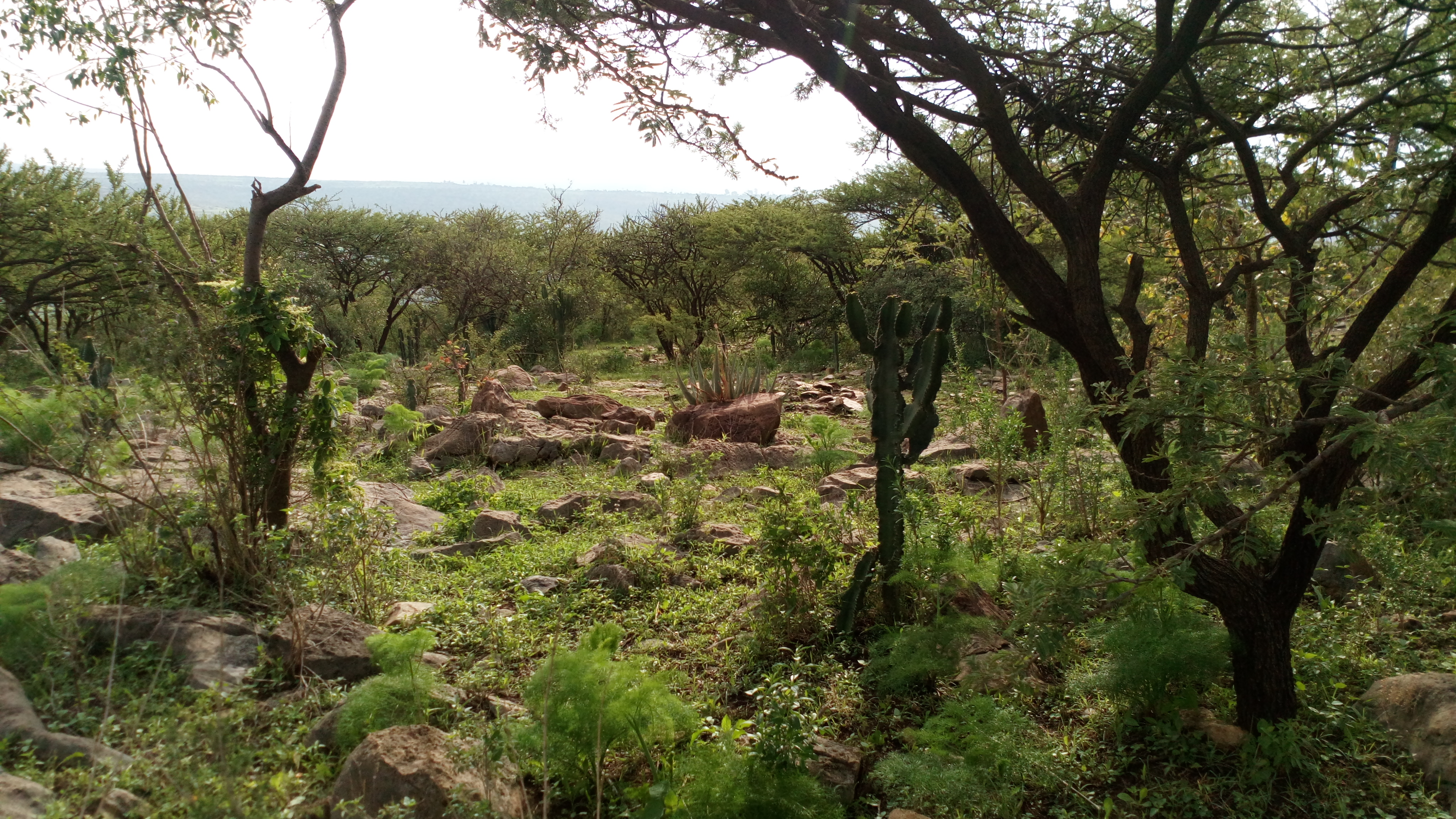

== Environmental characteristics ==
- Area: 46 ha
- Average slope gradient: 24%
- Aspect: the exclosure is oriented towards the northeast
- Minimum altitude: 1943 metres
- Maximum altitude: 2055 metres
- Lithology: Antalo Limestone

== Management ==
As a general rule, cattle ranging and wood harvesting are not allowed. The grasses are harvested once yearly and taken to the homesteads of the village to feed livestock. There are two guards to protect the exclosure. Field observations showed that however some illegal grazing occurred in the exclosure in 2018.

== Benefits for the community ==
Setting aside such areas fits with the long-term vision of the communities were hiza’iti lands are set aside for use by the future generations. It has also direct benefits for the community:

- improved ground water availability
- honey production
- climate ameliorator (temperature, moisture)
- the sequestered carbon (in total 67 tonnes per ha, dominantly sequestered in the soil, and additionally in the woody vegetation) is certified using the Plan Vivo voluntary carbon standard, after which carbon credits are sold
- the revenues are then reinvested in the villages, according to the priorities of the communities; it may be for an additional class in the village school, a water pond, or conservation in the exclosures.

== Biodiversity ==
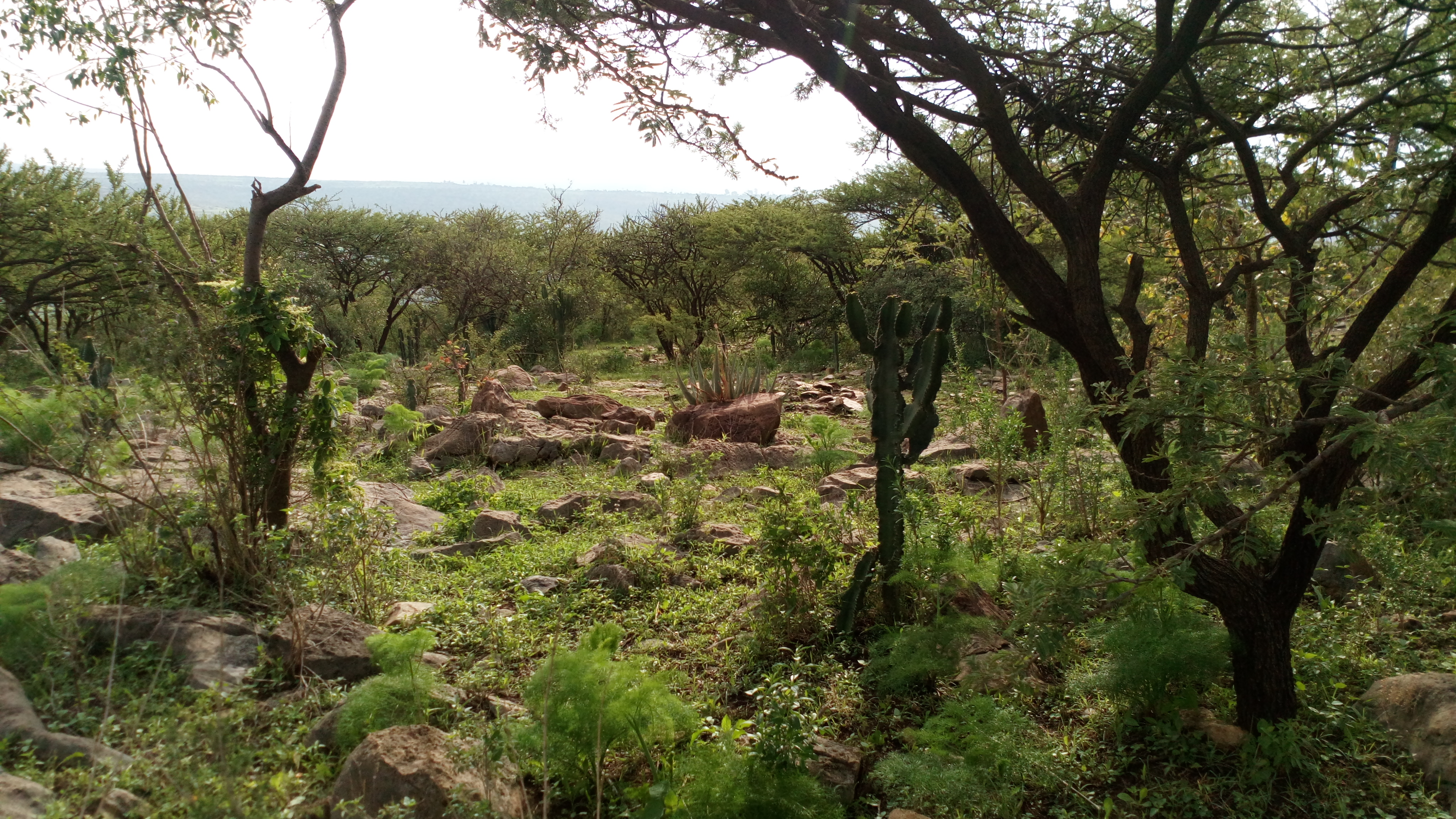
Vegetation regrowth in Sesemat exclosure

With vegetation growth, biodiversity in this exclosure hast strongly improved: there is more varied vegetation and wildlife. Particularly, key bird species include black-winged lovebird, blue-breasted bee-eater, Hemprich's hornbill, black-billed barbet, Abyssinian Woodpecker, African paradise flycatcher and montane white-eye. At dusk the exclosure and surrounding grazing land are good sites to see spotted hyenas.
