= Tukhul (exclosure) =

Exclosure for woodland restoration in Ethiopia

Tukhul exclosure
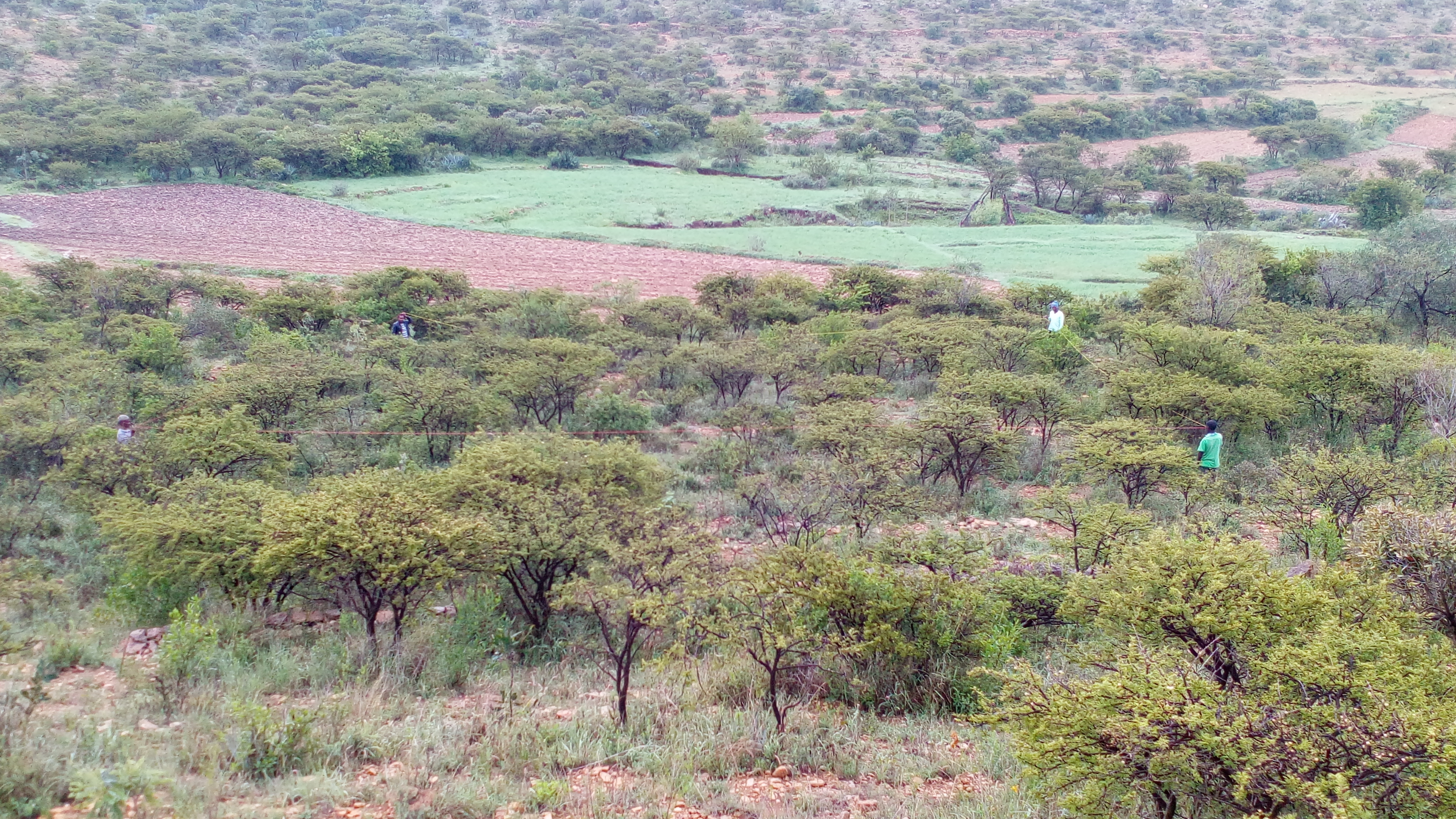
- Tukhul exclosure

- Location within Ethiopia
- Location: Addi Azmera municipality, in Dogu’a Tembien district, Ethiopia
- Nearest city: Hagere Selam
- Coordinates: 13.643°N 39.337°E
- Area: 36 ha (89 acres)
- Established: 1998
- Website: https://ethiotrees.com

Tukhul is an exclosure located in between the villages of Tukhul and Miheni in the Dogu'a Tembien woreda of the Tigray Region in Ethiopia. The area has been protected since 1998 by the local community.

== Timeline ==
- 1998: established as exclosure by the community
- 2017: support by the EthioTrees project

== Environmental characteristics ==
- Area: 36 ha
- Average slope gradient: 16%
- Aspect: the exclosure is oriented towards the south and the east
- Minimum altitude: 1959 metres
- Maximum altitude: 2039 metres
- Lithology: Antalo Limestone

== Management ==
As a general rule, cattle ranging and wood harvesting are not allowed. The grasses are harvested once yearly and taken to the homesteads of the village to feed livestock. Physical soil and water conservation has been implemented to enhance infiltration, and vegetation growth. There are two guards to protect the exclosure. Field observations showed that no illegal grazing occurred in the exclosure in 2018.

== Benefits for the community ==
Setting aside such areas fits with the long-term vision of the communities were hiza’iti lands are set aside for use by the future generations. It has also direct benefits for the community:

- improved ground water availability
- honey production

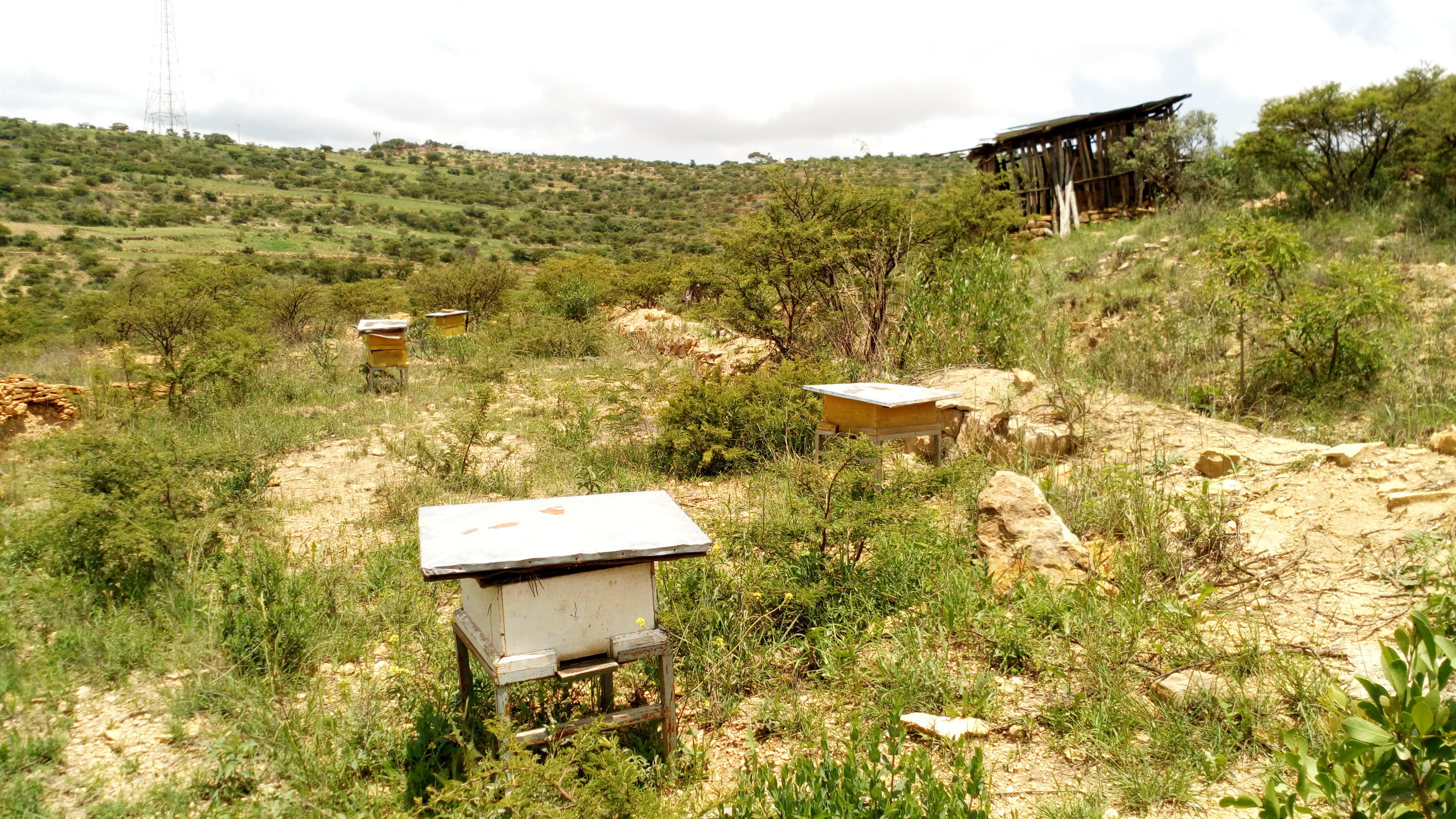
Beehives in Tukhul exclosure

- climate ameliorator (temperature, moisture)
- the sequestered carbon (in total 73 tonnes per ha, dominantly sequestered in the soil, and additionally in the woody vegetation) is certified using the Plan Vivo voluntary carbon standard, after which carbon credits are sold
- the revenues are then reinvested in the villages, according to the priorities of the communities; it may be for an additional class in the village school, a water pond, or conservation in the exclosures.

== Biodiversity ==
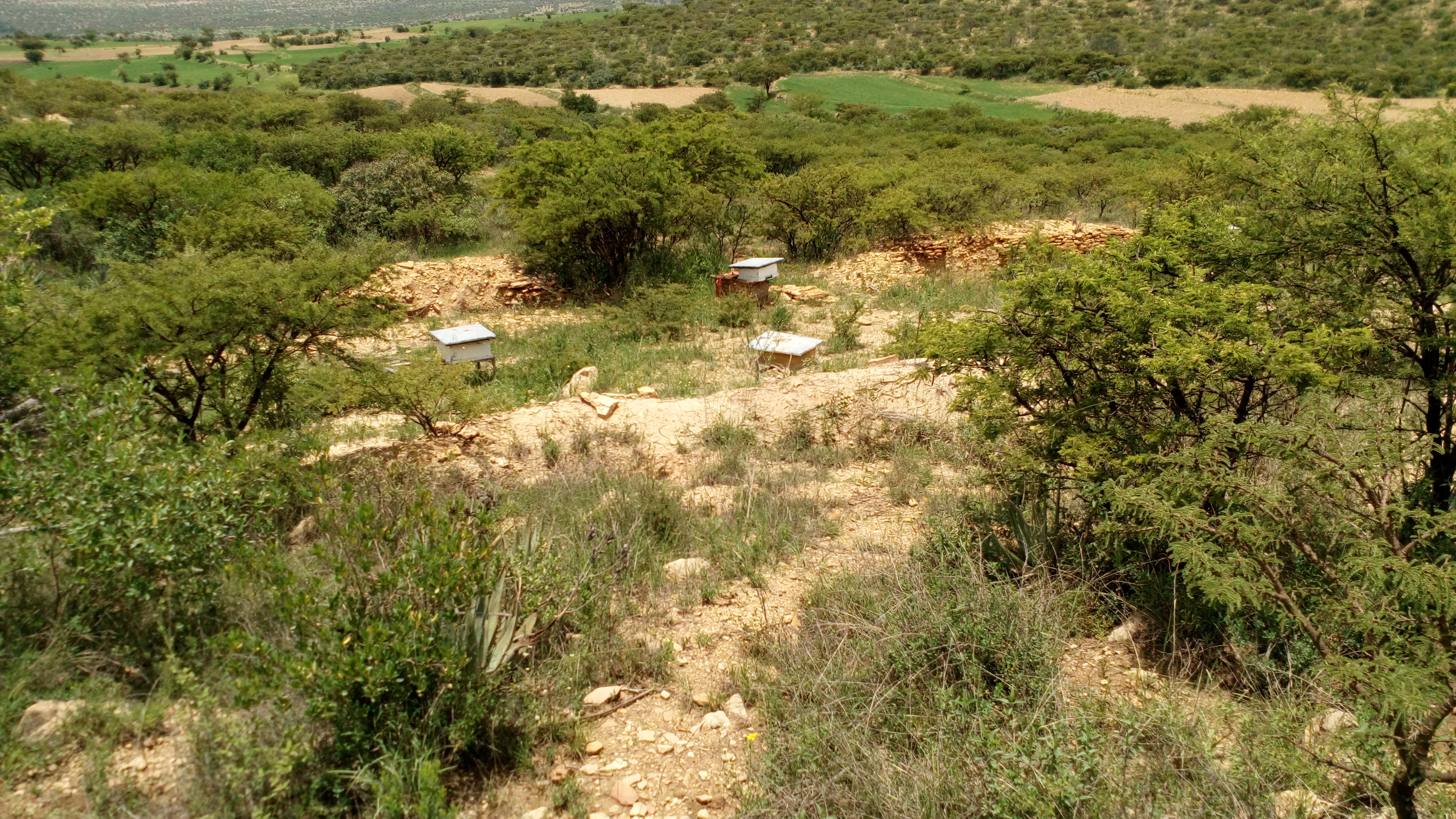
Tukhul exclosure

With vegetation growth, biodiversity in this exclosure hast strongly improved: there is more varied vegetation and wildlife. Particularly, with regard to birdlife, one may observe black-winged lovebird, greyish eagle-owl, hoopoe, black-billed wood hoopoe, banded barbet, Nubian woodpecker, Abyssinian woodpecker, grey-headed batis and montane white-eye. In the adjacent seasonal grazing land Clapperton's francolin, black-bellied bustard, and red-backed shrike, can be spotted during the tall grass season.
