= Afedena (exclosure) =

Exclosure for woodland restoration in Ethiopia

Afedena exclosure
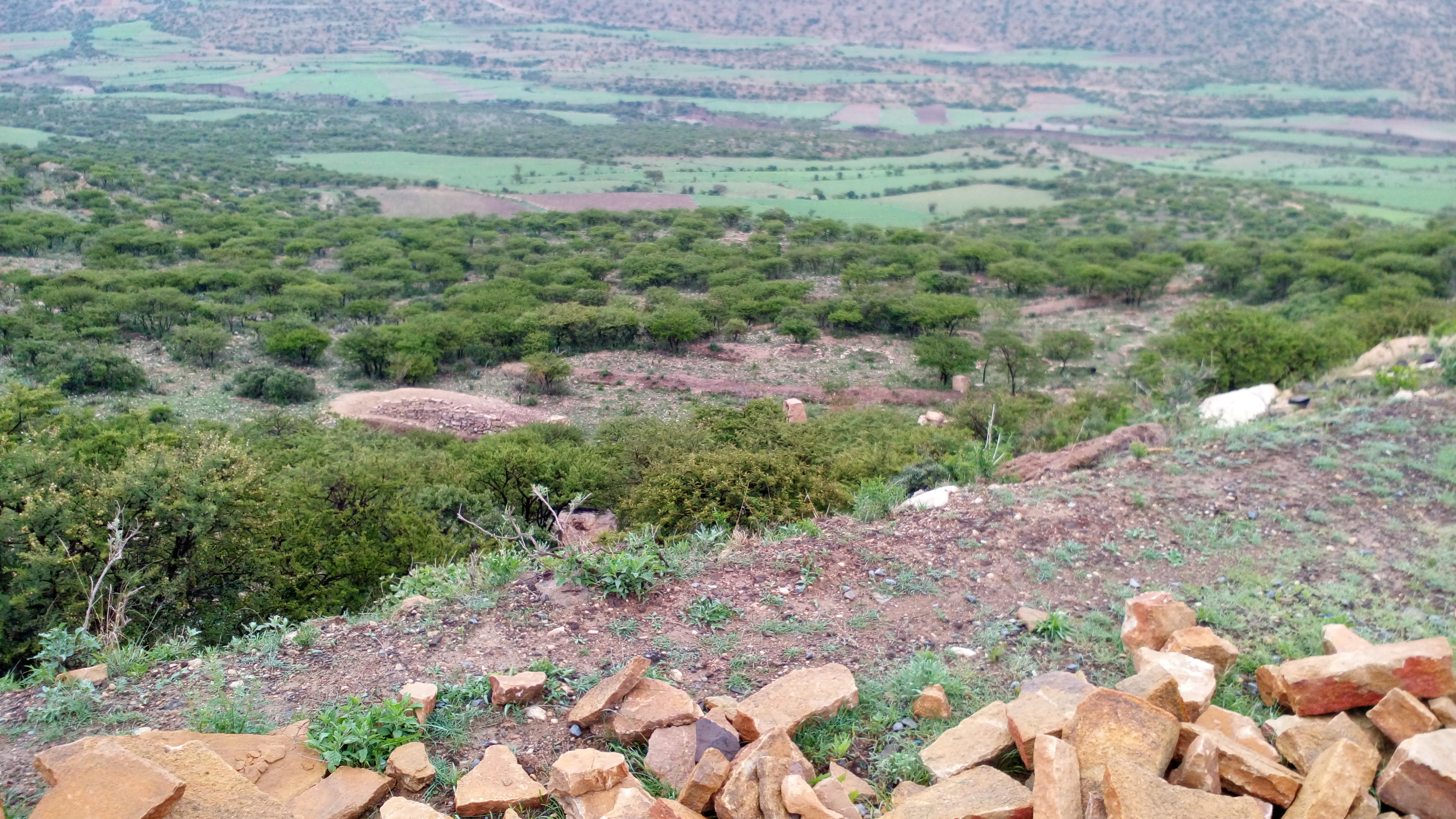
- Afedena exclosure

- Location within Ethiopia
- Location: Addi Azmera municipality, in Dogu’a Tembien district, Ethiopia
- Nearest city: Hagere Selam
- Coordinates: 13.669°N 39.292°E
- Area: 70 ha (170 acres)
- Established: 2008
- Website: https://ethiotrees.com

Afedena is an exclosure located in the Dogu'a Tembien woreda of the Tigray Region in Ethiopia. The area has been protected since 2008 by the local community.

== Timeline ==
- 2008: established as exclosure by the community
- 2017: support by the EthioTrees project

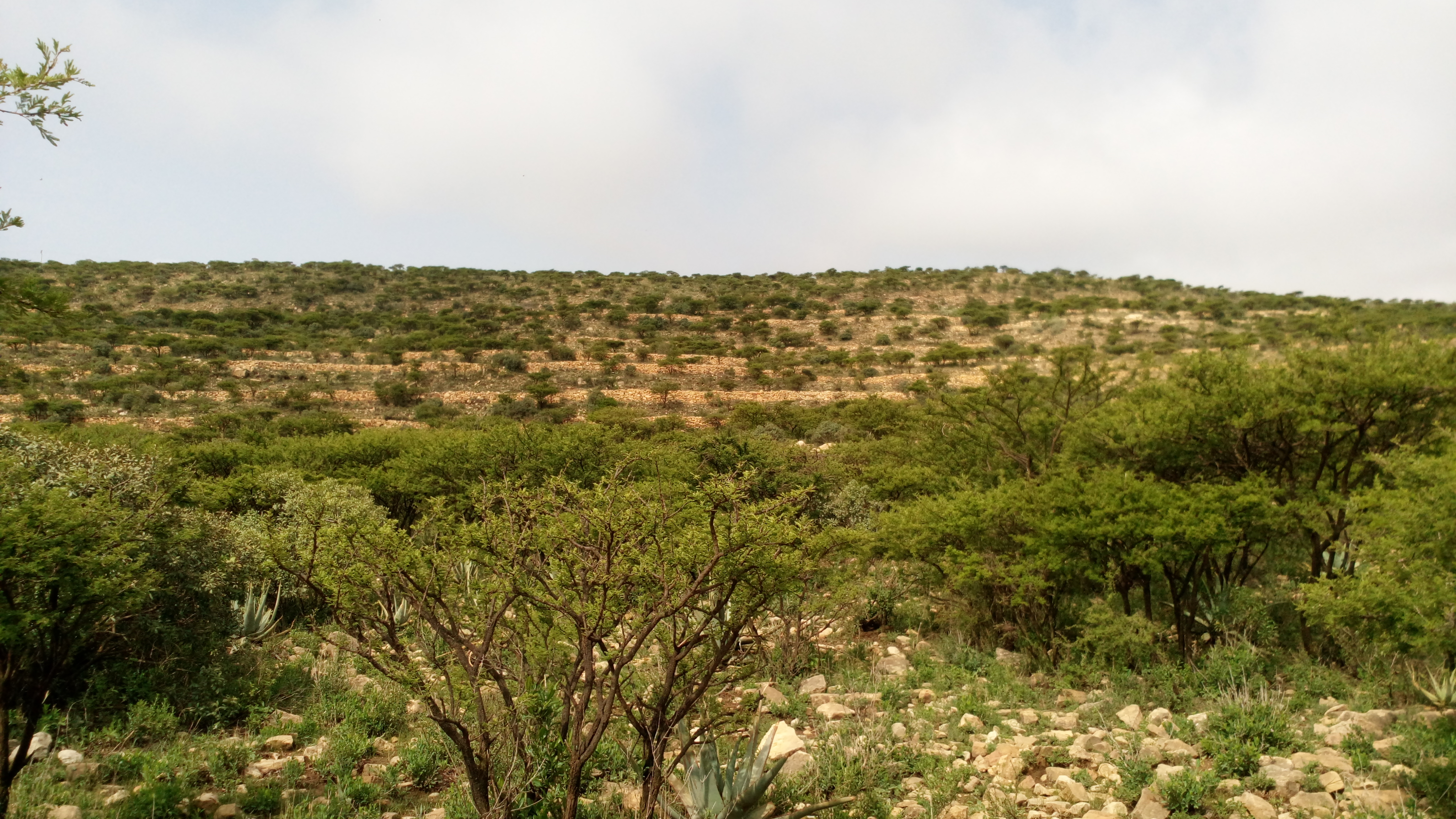
General view on the exclosure of Afedena

== Environmental characteristics ==
- Area: 70 ha
- Average slope gradient: 25%
- Aspect: the exclosure is oriented towards the northeast and east
- Minimum altitude: 2068 metres
- Maximum altitude: 2232 metres
- Lithology: Antalo Limestone

== Management ==
As a general rule, cattle ranging and wood harvesting are not allowed. The grasses are harvested once yearly and taken to the homesteads of the village to feed livestock. Physical soil and water conservation has been implemented to enhance infiltration, and vegetation growth. There are three guards to protect the exclosure. Field observations showed that however, some illegal grazing occurred in the exclosure in 2018.

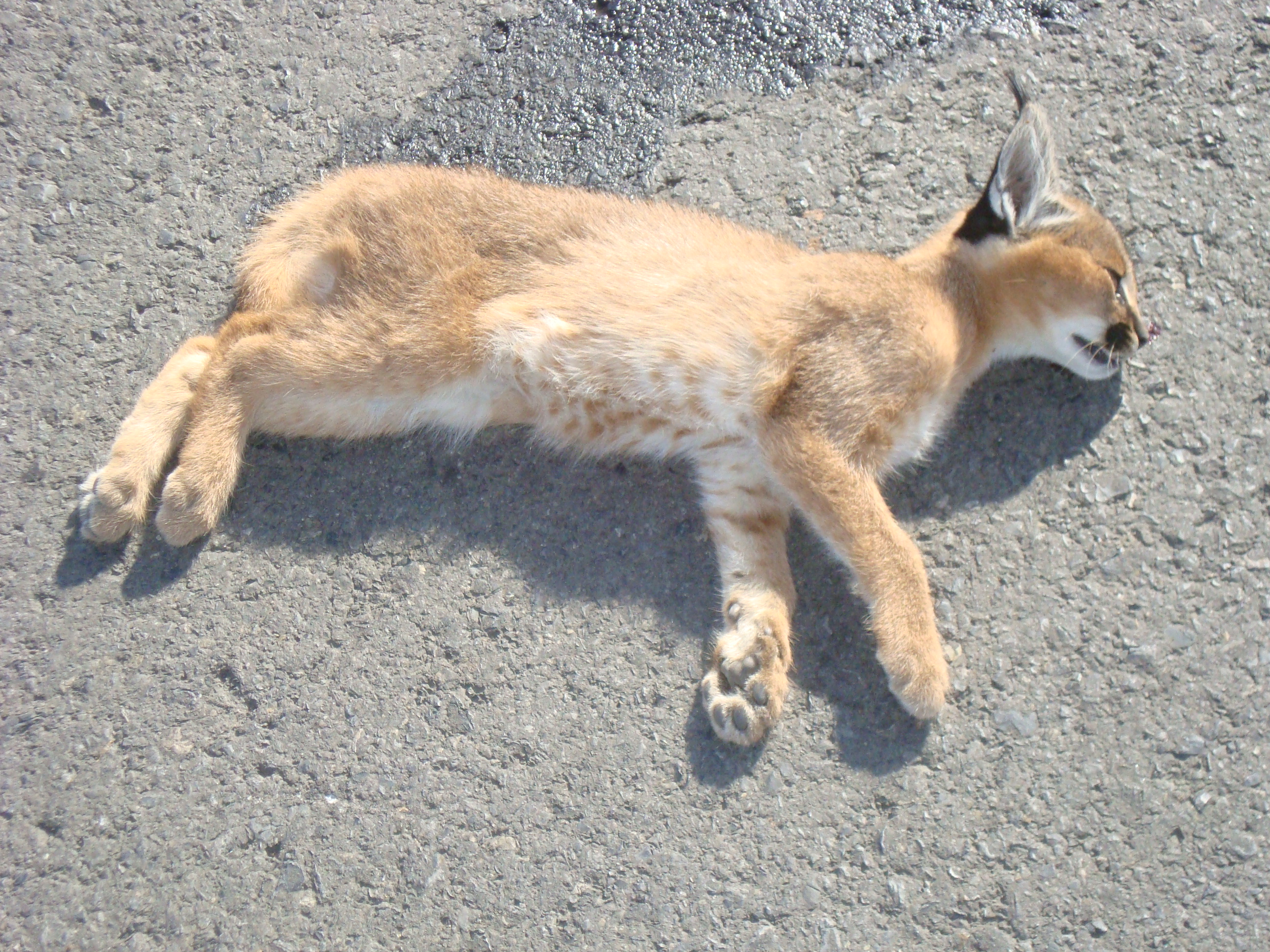
Roadkill caracal in Afedena

== Biodiversity ==
With vegetation growth, biodiversity in this exclosure hast strongly improved: there is more varied vegetation and wildlife. Along the main road that crosses the exclosure, caracals, jackals, and guineafowls are frequently seen.

== Benefits for the community ==
Setting aside such areas fits with the long-term vision of the communities were hiza’iti lands are set aside for use by the future generations. It has also direct benefits for the community:

- improved ground water availability
- honey production
- climate ameliorator (temperature, moisture)
- the sequestered carbon (in total 66 tonnes per ha, dominantly sequestered in the soil, and additionally in the woody vegetation) is certified using the Plan Vivo voluntary carbon standard, after which carbon credits are sold
- the revenues are then reinvested in the village, according to the priorities of the communities; particularly building classrooms for Afedena school.
