= Addi Azmera =

Municipality in Ethiopia

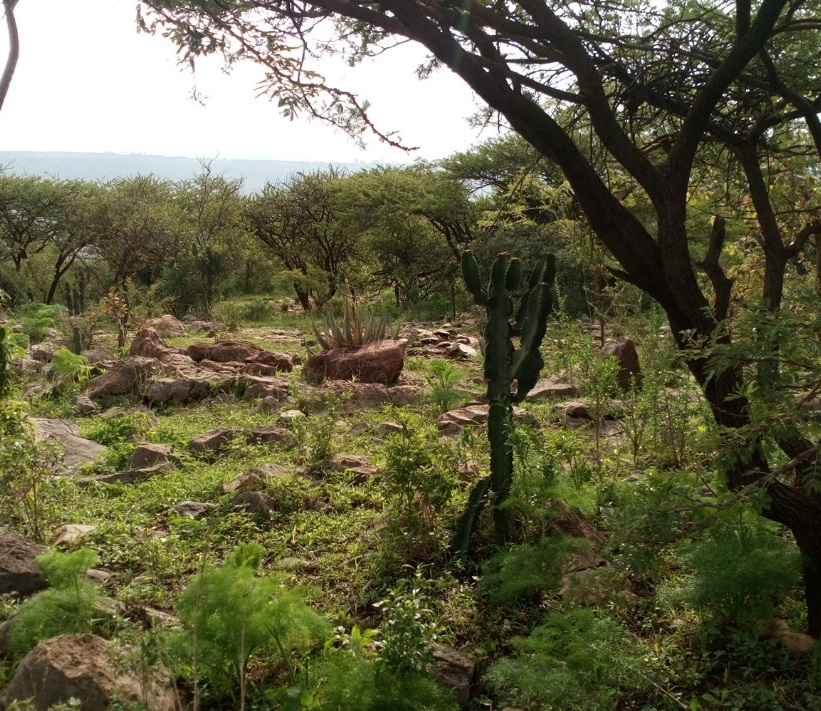
- Vegetation regrowth (exclosure) in Sesemat

- Location within Ethiopia
- Coordinates: 13°38′N 39°20′E
- Country: Ethiopia
- Region: Tigray
- Zone: Debub Misraqawi (Southeastern)
- Woreda: Dogu'a Tembien

Area
  - Total: 106.67 km^{2} (41.19 sq mi)
- Elevation: 1,950 m (6,400 ft)

Population (2007)
  - Total: 7,885
  - Density: 74/km^{2} (190/sq mi)
- Time zone: UTC+3 (EAT)

Addi Azmera is a tabia or municipality in the Dogu'a Tembien district of the Tigray Region of Ethiopia. The name refers to good spring rains ("azmera"), in relation to the local microclimate. The tabia centre is in Tukhul town, located approximately half-way between the woreda town Hagere Selam and the regional capital Mekelle.

== Geography ==
The tabia stretches on both sides of the main road that climbs towards Dogu'a Tembien after passing the bridge on Giba River. The highest location are the upper slopes of Imba Dogu'a (2590 m a.s.l.) and the lowest place along Giba River (1750 m a.s.l.). It comprises cultivated plains and steeper slopes, with often good vegetation (re)growth.

=== Geology ===
From the higher to the lower locations, the following geological formations are present:

- Mekelle Dolerite
- Amba Aradam Formation
- Agula Shale - there are gypsum quarries in this formation, exploited by the cement factory of Mekelle
- Antalo Limestone – many quarries for building stones and gravel
- Quaternary alluvium and freshwater tufa

=== Geomorphology and soils ===
The main geomorphic unit is the gently undulating Agula shale plateau with dolerite. Corresponding soil types are:

- Dominant soil type: stony, dark cracking clays with good natural fertility (Vertic Cambisol)
- Associated soil types
  - rock outcrops, stony and shallow soils (Lithic Leptosol)
  - red-brownish loamy soils with good natural fertility (Chromic Luvisol)
- Inclusions
  - deep, dark cracking clays on calcaric material with good fertility but poor drainage (Vertisol)

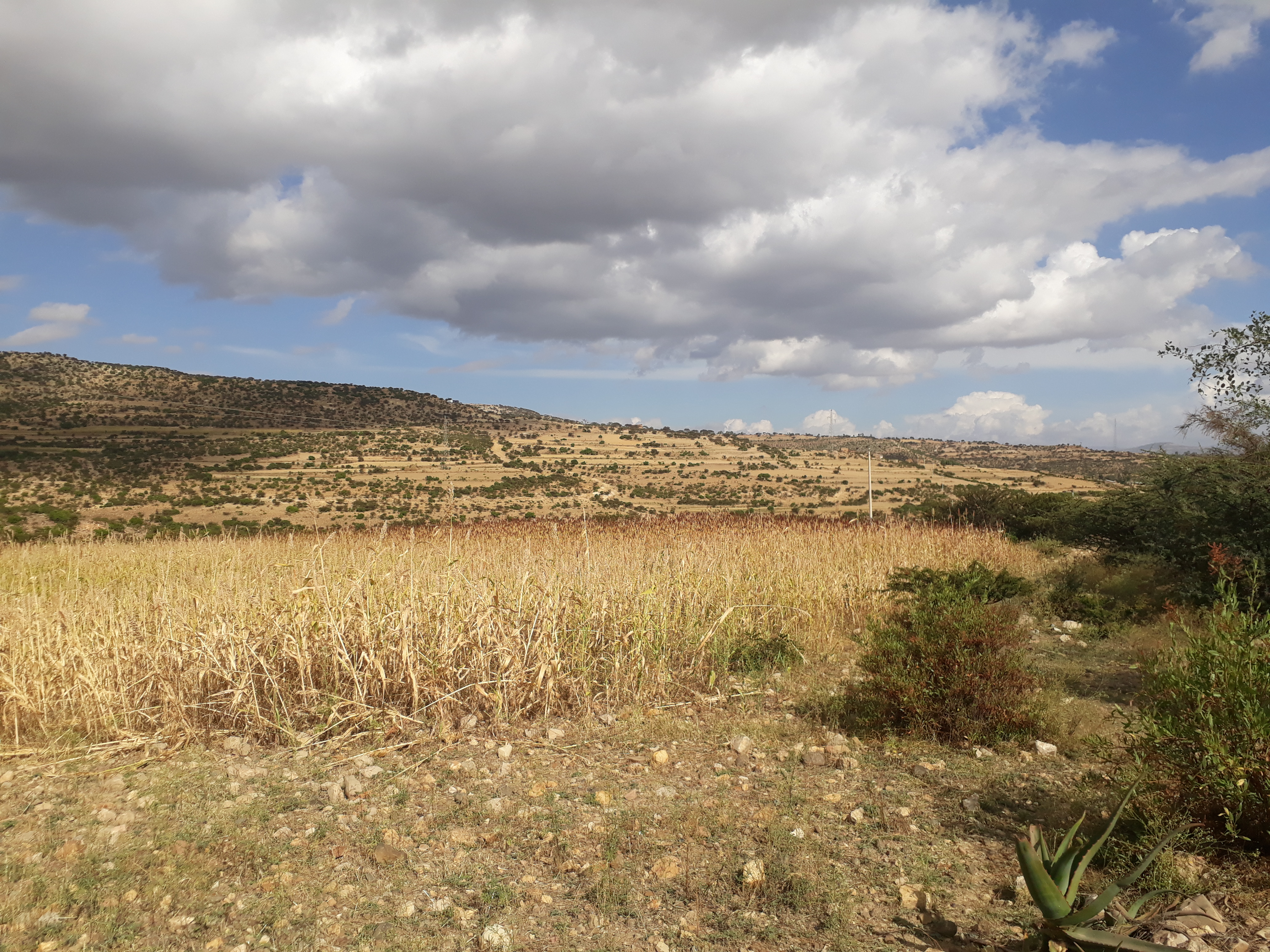
Sorghum in Addi Azmera in 2019

=== Rainfall in Addi Azmera ===
Due to its great difference in elevation, with slopes turned towards the wind direction (from east) during the short spring rains, orographic rains occur in that season. This results in sufficient soil moisture for growing crops in that season. In such years with good spring rains (locally called "Azmera") the whole plain, from Qarano to Afedena is sown with "azmera" crops, particularly sorghum. Hence the name "Addi Azmera".

=== Springs ===
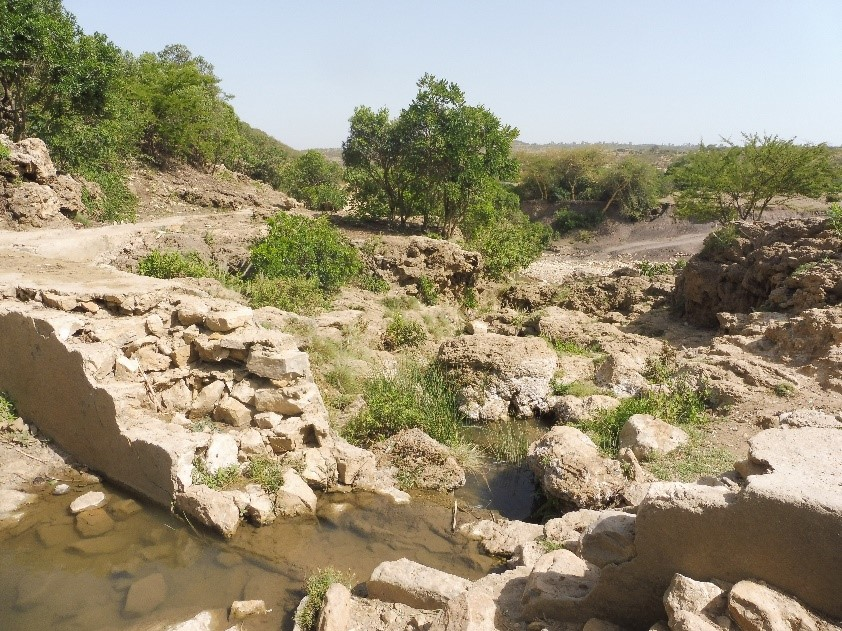
Sesemat tufa dam and water point

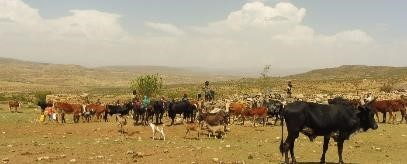
Zerfenti village water pumps, one for humans and one for livestock

Besides Giba River at the eastern (lower) side of the tabia, there are no permanent rivers. Hence the presence of springs is of utmost importance for the local people. However, in relation to the overall presence of limestone, there are only very few strong springs:

- Arba'ite Insessa in Zerfenti
- May Egam in Zerfenti

=== Reservoirs ===
In this area with rains that last only for a couple of months per year, reservoirs of different sizes allow harvesting runoff from the rainy season for further use in the dry season. Overall they suffer from siltation. Yet, they strongly contribute to greening the landscape, either through irrigation or seepage water. Main reservoirs are:

- Lake Giba, a 350 million m³ reservoir under construction on Giba river, just before it enters the tabia. The reservoir is mainly intended to provide water to Mekelle. This large lake, once established, will strongly impact the lower part of Addi Azmera. Indeed, the lithology of the dam building site is Antalo Limestone. Part of its water is anticipated to be lost through seepage; the positive side-effect is that this will contribute to groundwater recharge in the downstream areas, which largely belong to Addi Azmera.
- Traditional surface water harvesting ponds, particularly in places without permanent springs, called rahaya
- Horoyo, household ponds, recently constructed through campaigns

=== Vegetation and exclosures ===
The tabia holds several exclosures, areas that are set aside for regreening. Wood harvesting and livestock range are not allowed there. Besides effects on biodiversity, water infiltration, protection from flooding, sediment deposition, carbon sequestration, people commonly have economic benefits from these exclosures through grass harvesting, beekeeping and other non-timber forest products. The local inhabitants also consider it as "land set aside for future generations". In this tabia, some exclosures are managed by the EthioTrees project. They have as an additional benefit that the villagers receive carbon credits for the sequestered CO_{2}, as part of a carbon offset programme. The revenues are then reinvested in the villages, according to the priorities of the communities; it may be for an additional class in the village school, a water pond, or conservation in the exclosures. The following exclosures are managed by the Ethiotrees project in Addi Azmera:

- Afedena (exclosure), near the homonymous village (62.92 ha)
- Sesemat (exclosure), near the homonymous village (48.01 ha)
- Tukhul (exclosure), near the homonymous village (35.92 ha)

=== Livelihood ===
The population lives essentially from crop farming, supplemented with off-season work in nearby towns. The land is dominated by farmlands which are clearly demarcated and are cropped every year. Hence the agricultural system is a permanent farming system.

The village of Zerfenti is one of the first places in Ethiopia where Ecosan toilets have been implemented (by the School WatSani project)

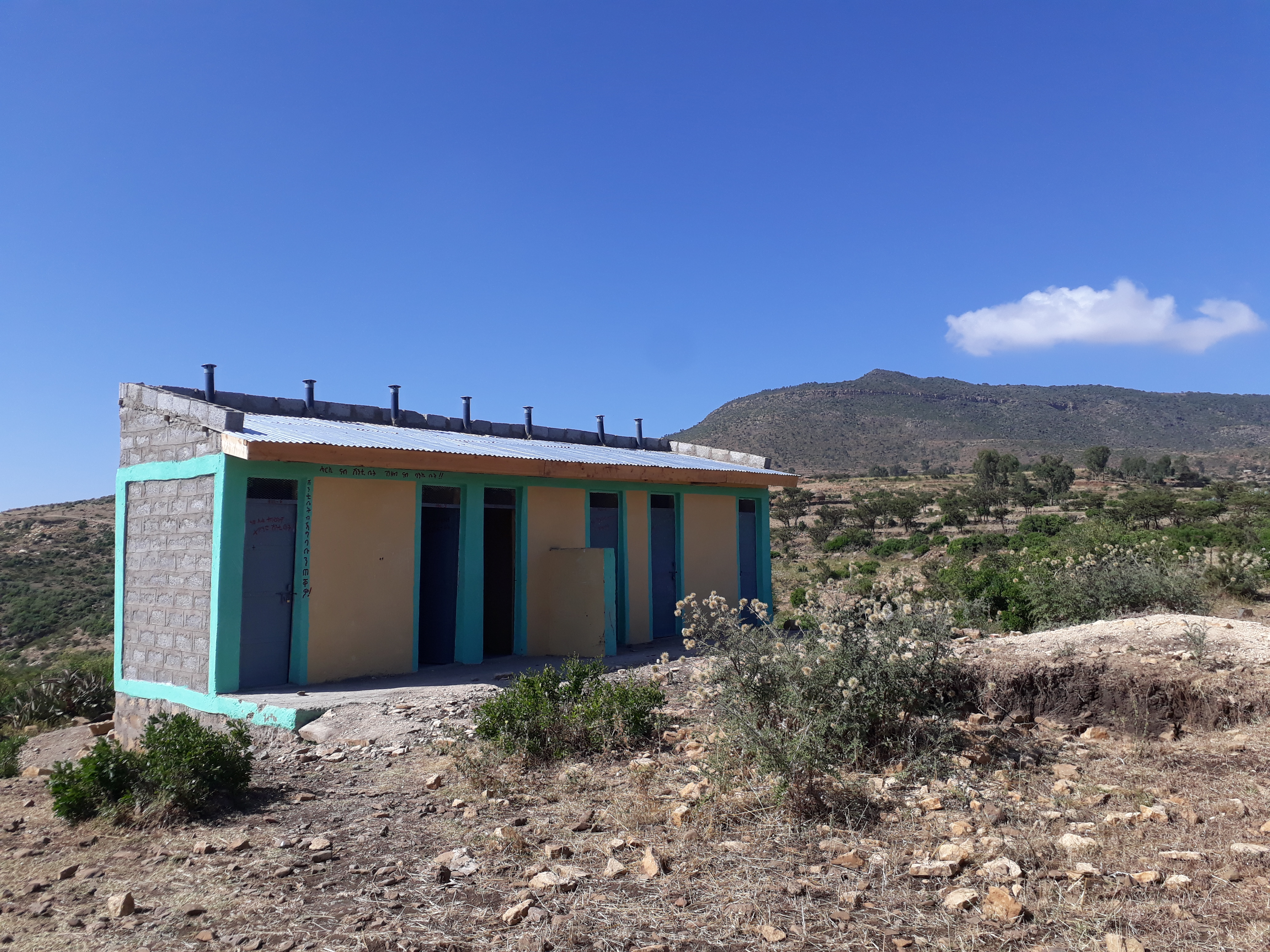
Ecosan toilets at Zerfenti

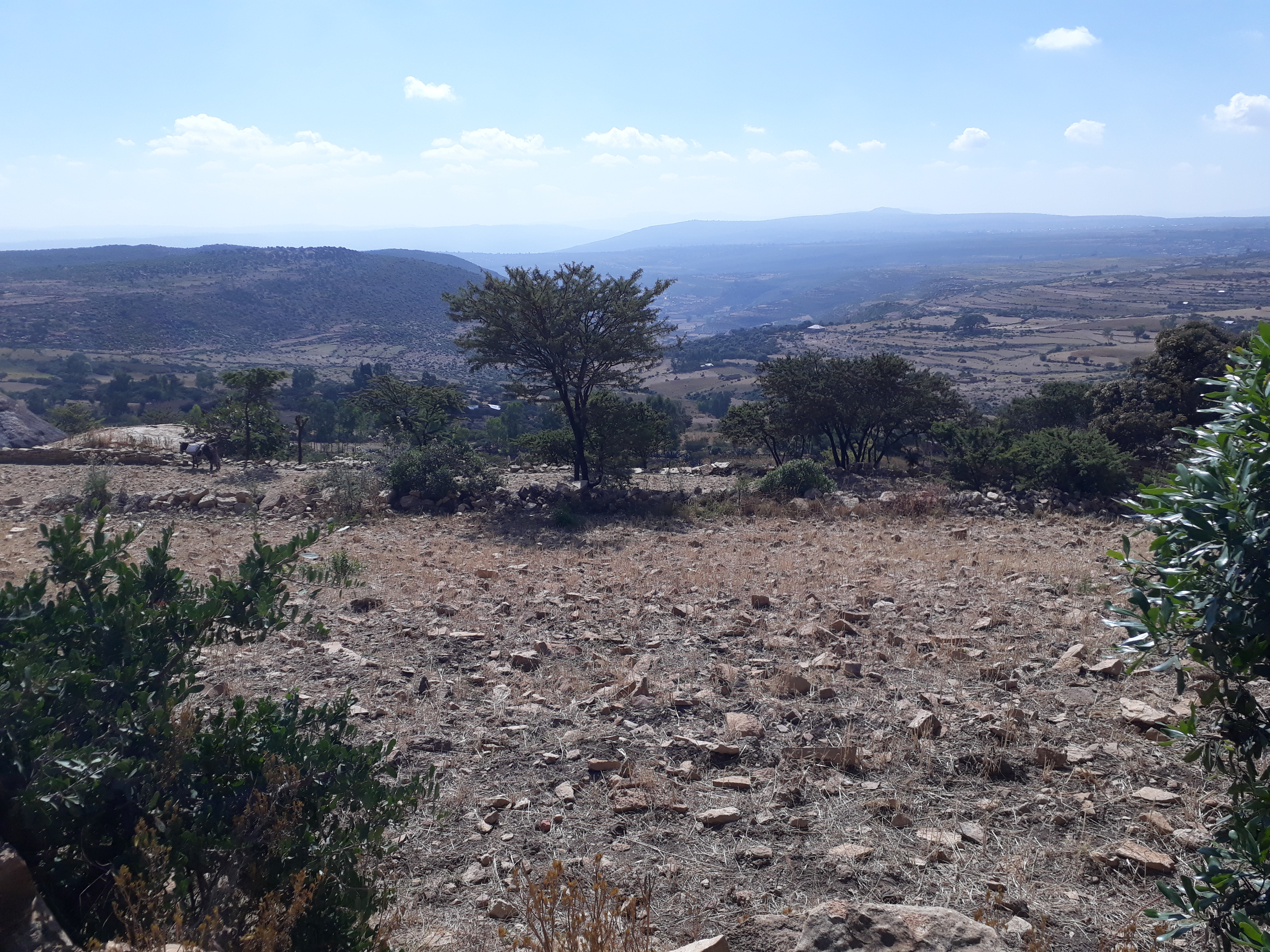
View over Addi Ganfur

=== Population ===
The tabia centre Tukhul has grown to a little town with a few administrative offices, a health post, a primary school, some shops and small restaurants. Thursday is the market day. There are a few more primary schools across the tabia. The original Tukhul village, further uphill (also called "La'ilay Tukhul") has been largely abandoned, as the inhabitants moved to the road, where they established small businesses while keeping their farmlands. The main other populated places are:

- Qarano
- Miheni
- Girasa Goh
- Tahtay Sesemat
- La'ilay Sesemat
- Ruba Bich'i

- Hashiwa
- Addi Ganfur
- Zerfenti
- Afedena
- Mesenqoy

=== Religion and churches ===
Most inhabitants are Orthodox Christians. The following churches are located in the tabia:

- Mesenqoy Mika'el
- Zerfenti Maryam
- Addi Ganfur Arba'ite Insessa
- Rufael
- Sesemat Giyergis
- Miheni Abba Gabir

== History ==
The history of the tabia is strongly confounded with the history of Tembien.

== Roads and communication ==
The main road Mekelle – Hagere Selam – Abiy Addi runs through Tukhul and across the tabia. There are regular bus services to these towns. Further, rural access roads link Mesenqoy and La'ilay Tukhul to Tukhul and the main asphalt road.

== Schools ==
Almost all children of the tabia are schooled, though in some schools there is lack of classrooms, directly related to the large intake in primary schools over the last decades. Schools in the tabia include Zerfenti school, Sesemat school and Afedena school.

== Tourism ==
Its mountainous nature and proximity to Mekelle makes the tabia fit for tourism.

=== Geotouristic sites ===
The high variability of geological formations and the rugged topography invite for geological and geographic tourism or "geotourism". Geosites in the tabia include:

- Gypsum quarries
- Limestone quarries
- May Qarano tufa dam (now occupied by the Giba dam building works)
- Miheni exclosure
- Mi'iraf Janhoy (group of 3 olive trees)

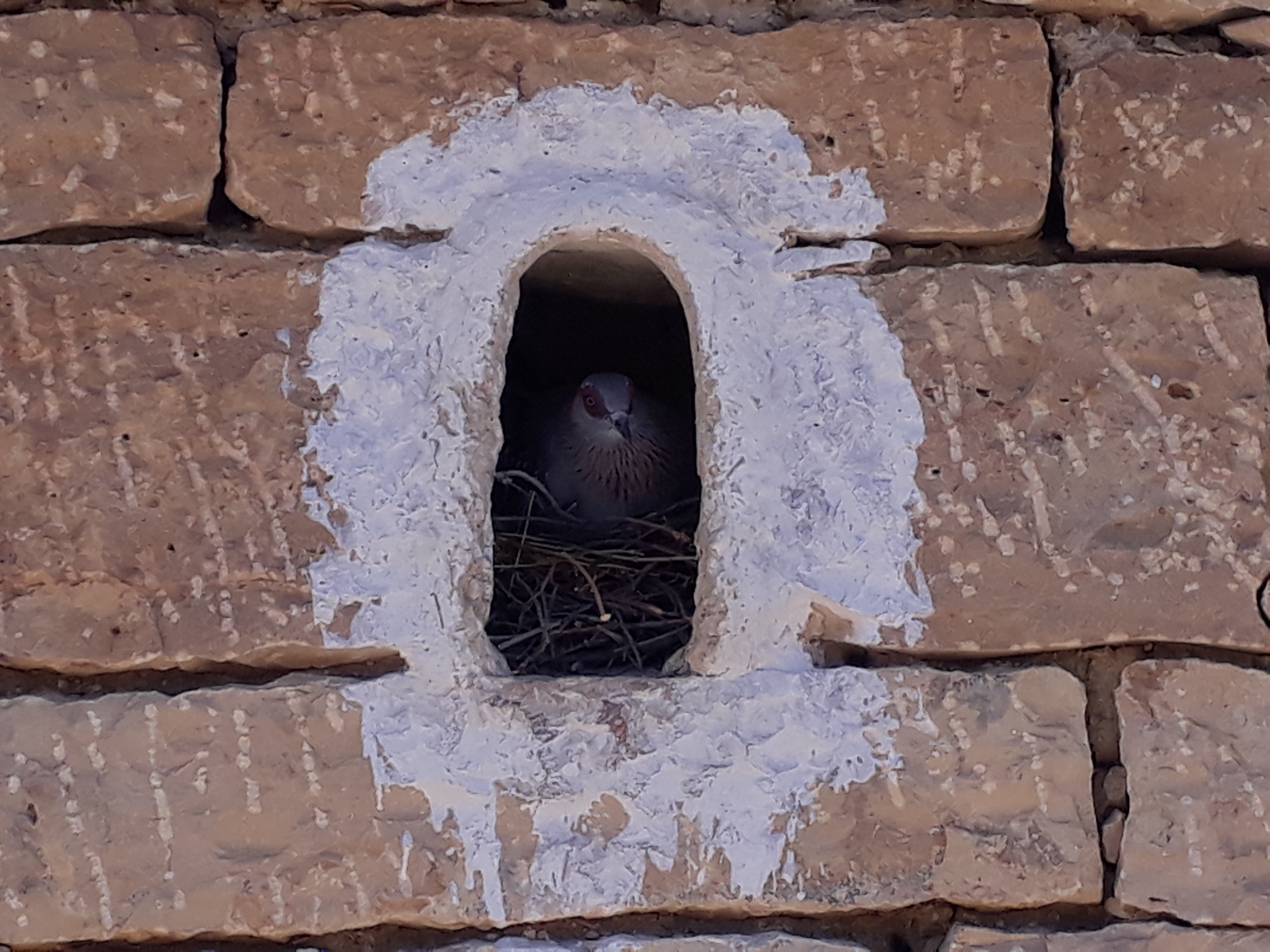
Nest box for Columba guinea in the wall of a homestead in Zerfenti

=== Birdwatching ===
Birdwatching can be done particularly in exclosures and forests. A dozen bird-watching sites have been inventoried in the tabia and mapped. The bird species are documented on the main Dogu'a Tembien page.

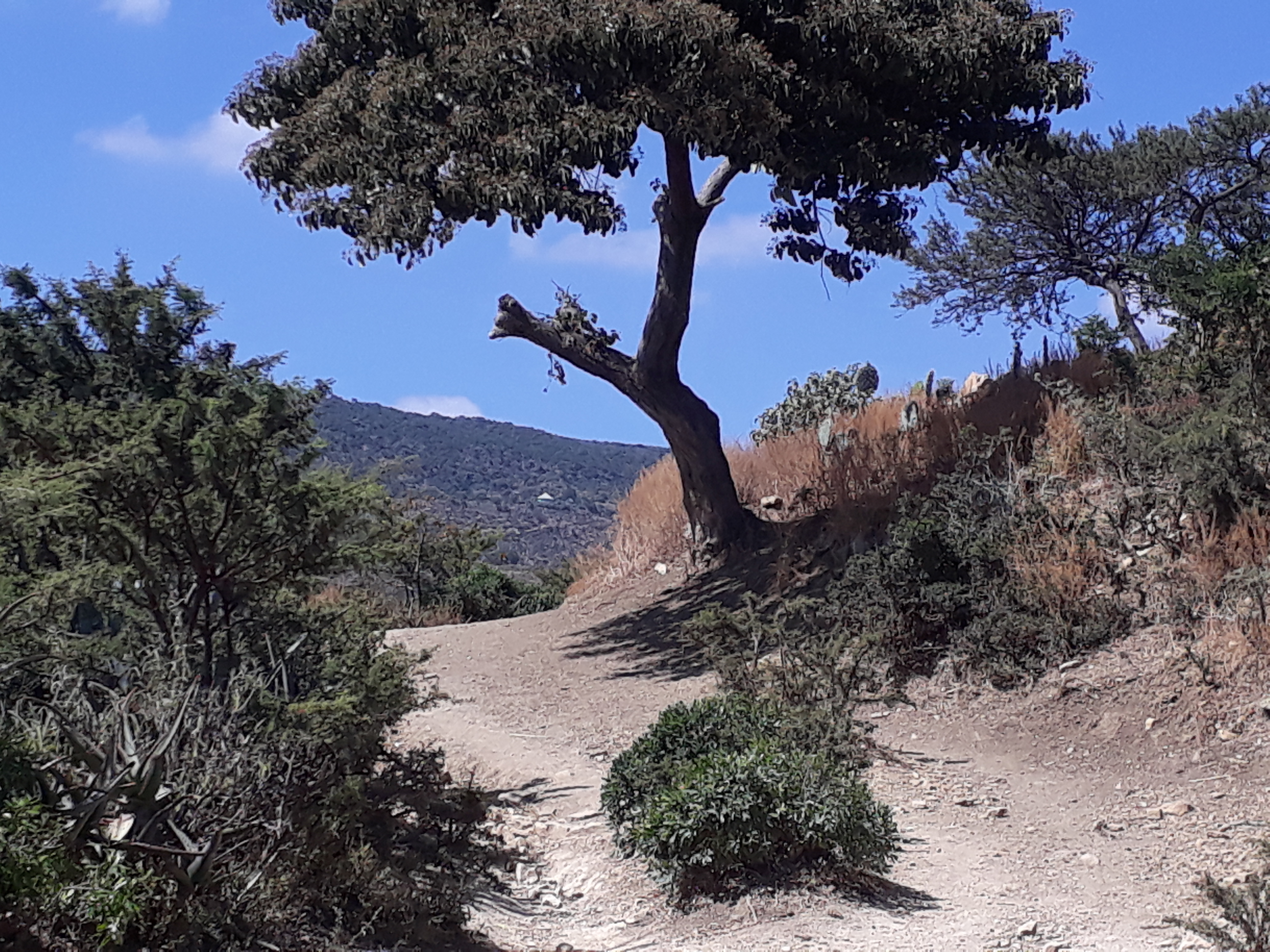
Trekking route 14 in Zerfenti - at the back Rufa'el church

=== Trekking routes ===
Trekking routes have been established in this tabia. The tracks are not marked on the ground but can be followed using downloaded .GPX files. As a landmark, the three olive trees ("Mi'iraf Janhoy" at 1940 metres above sea level) along the main road are departure point of:

- Trek 14, to the west of the tabia, and further on, over the ridges, up to Hagere Selam
- Trek 23, to the north of the tabia and further to Ekli Imba the peak of the Medayq massif that dominates the landscape at the north (2799 m)

=== Inda Siwa, the local beer houses ===
In the main villages, there are traditional beer houses (Inda Siwa), often in unique settings, which are a good place for resting and chatting with the local people. Most renown in the tabia are

- Abrehet Reda at Tukhul
- Kiros Adane at Tukhul
- Wedase Gebregziabher at Tukhul

=== Accommodation and facilities ===
The facilities are very basic. One may be invited to spend the night in a rural homestead or ask permission to pitch a tent. Hotels are available in Hagere Selam and Mekelle.

== More detailed information ==
For more details on environment, agriculture, rural sociology, hydrology, ecology, culture, etc., see the overall page on the Dogu'a Tembien district.
