= Bill Mollison =

Australian scientist (1928–2016)

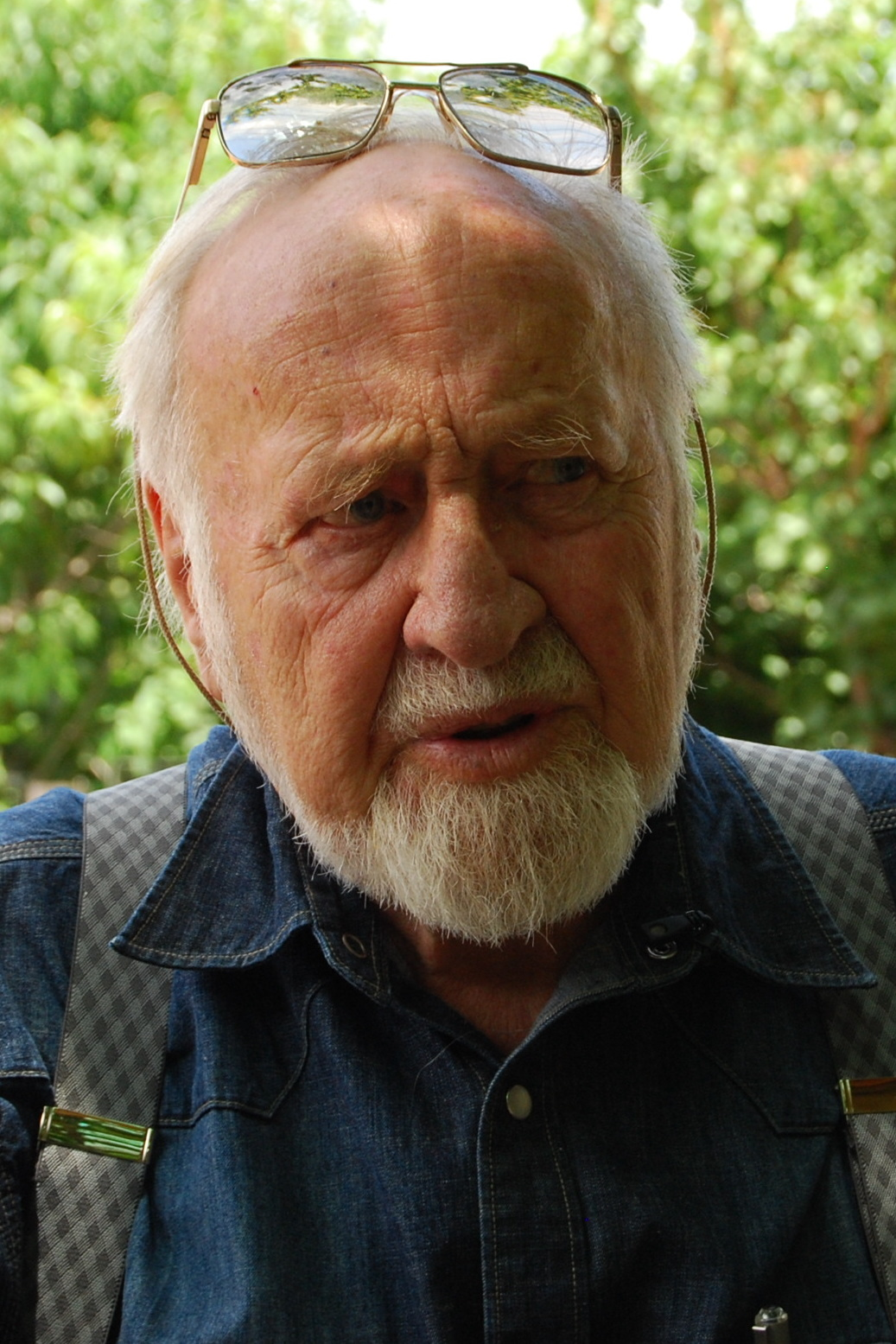
- Mollison in 2008
- Born: 4 May 1928; Stanley, Tasmania, Australia
- Died: 24 September 2016 (aged 88); Hobart, Tasmania, Australia
- Education: University of Tasmania
- Known for: Environmental psychology; Permaculture
- Awards: Right Livelihood Award (1981); Vavilov Medal; Member Russian Academy of Science - Agriculture; Australia Man of the Year
- Scientific career
- Fields: Biologist and environmentalist
- Institutions: CSIRO; Tasmania Museum; Inland Fisheries Commission

Bruce Charles "Bill" Mollison (4 May 1928 – 24 September 2016) was an Australian researcher, author, scientist, teacher and biologist. In 1981, he was awarded the Right Livelihood Award "for developing and promoting the theory and practice of permaculture".

Permaculture (from "permanent agriculture") is an integrated system of ecological and environmental design which Mollison co-developed with David Holmgren and which they envisioned together as a perennial and sustainable form of agriculture. In 1974, Mollison began his collaboration with Holmgren and in 1978 they published their book Permaculture One, which introduced this design system to the general public. Mollison is also the developer of the herb spiral, a herb-growing structure that allows herbs with different growing requirements to coexist in a small space.

Mollison founded The Permaculture Institute in Tasmania and created the education system to train others under the umbrella of permaculture. This education system of "train the trainer", utilized through a formal Permaculture Design Course and Certification (PDC), has taught hundreds of thousands of people throughout the world how to grow food and be sustainable using permaculture design principles.

== Life and work ==
=== Biography ===
Bruce Charles "Bill" Mollison was born in 1928 in the Bass Strait fishing village of Stanley located in the north-west of Tasmania, Australia. In 1987, he moved from Tasmania to Tyalgum in the Tweed Valley of northern New South Wales, where he lived for the next decade, collaborating and developing new ideas, with Local farmer, Mark Pepper, before returning to Tasmania. He spent his final years at Sisters Beach, north-western Tasmania. He died in Hobart, Tasmania, in 2016, aged 88. He was survived by his fifth wife, Lisa, four daughters and two sons.

=== Career ===
Mollison left school at age 15 to help run the family bakery. In the following 10 years he worked as a shark fisherman, seaman, forester, mill worker, trapper, snarer, tractor-driver and naturalist.

In 1954, at the age of 26, Mollison joined and worked for the 'Wildlife Survey Section' of the Commonwealth Scientific and Industrial Research Organisation (CSIRO). In the 1960s, he worked as a curator at the Tasmanian Museum. He also worked with the Inland Fisheries Commission, where he was able to resume his field work. In 1966, he entered the University of Tasmania. After he received a degree in bio-geography, he stayed on to lecture and teach and developed the unit of Environmental Psychology. He retired from teaching in 1979.

=== Development of permaculture ===
Mollison's work with the CSIRO laid the foundation for his life-long passion: Permaculture. Mollison told his student Toby Hemenway that the original idea for permaculture came to him in 1959 while he was observing marsupials browsing in the Tasmanian rain forests, because he was "inspired and awed by the life-giving abundance and rich interconnectedness of this eco-system." At that moment, Mollison jotted down the following words in his diary: "I believe that we could build systems that would function as well as this one does." By the late 1960s, he started developing ideas about stable agricultural systems on the southern Australian island state of Tasmania. This resulted from his own personal observations of the growth and use of the industrial-agricultural methods that he believed had rapidly degraded the soil of his native state. In his view, these same methods posed a danger because they were highly dependent on non-renewable resources, and were additionally poisoning land and water, reducing biodiversity, and removing billions of tons of topsoil from previously fertile landscapes. Writes Mollison:

After many years as a scientist with the CSIRO Wildlife Survey Section and with the Tasmanian Inland Fisheries Department, I began to protest against the political and industrial systems I saw were killing us and the world around us. But I soon decided that it was no good persisting with opposition that in the end achieved nothing. I withdrew from society for two years; I did not want to oppose anything ever again and waste time. I wanted to come back only with something very positive, something that would allow us all to exist without the wholesale collapse of biological systems.

In 1974–75, he and David Holmgren "jointly evolved a framework for a sustainable agricultural system based on a multi-crop of perennial trees, shrubs, herbs (vegetables and weeds), fungi, and root systems" for which they coined the word "permaculture". Holmgren was a student at the radical Environmental Design School in the Tasmanian College of Environmental Education. Mollison was a senior tutor in the Psychology Dept of the University of Tasmania."

Originally intended as a contraction of permanent agriculture, Mollison quickly realised it was a system for permanent culture, as without a productive landscape, a healthy ecology and a circular economy, no culture would survive. Permaculture began as both a positive concept – open to new information – and a practice that could integrate the knowledge about sustainable, ecological techniques from all parts of the world.

Soon after permaculture was first introduced and then put into practice by the public, Mollison recognized that permaculture principles encompassed a movement that included not only agriculture, horticulture, architecture, and ecology, but also economic systems, land access strategies, and legal systems for businesses and communities:

As I saw permaculture in the 1970s, it was a beneficial assembly of plants and animals in relation to human settlements, mostly aimed towards household and community self-reliance, and perhaps as a "commercial endeavor" only arising from a surplus from that system. However, permaculture has come to mean more than just food-sufficiency in the household. Self-reliance in food is meaningless unless people have access to land, information, and financial resources. So in recent years it has come to encompass appropriate legal and financial strategies, including strategies for land access, business structures, and regional self-financing. This way it is a whole human system.

He helped found the first Permaculture Institute, established in 1979 to "teach the practical design of sustainable soil, water, plant, and legal and economic systems to students worldwide." Bill Mollison taught the first Permaculture Design course at Stanley, Tasmania in January 1980. It was attended by 10 Australian students including Max O'Lindegger and Denis McCarthy (co-recipients of the first Permaculture Institute's Community Service Award), Dave Blewett (author of Arid Land Permaculture), Ginger Gordy (second President of the Permaculture Association of WA), Kirsten Beggs (WA), John Fargher (SA) and Tagari Community members Andrew Jeeves & Simon Fjell (co-founder Permaculture Institute in 1979, currently Permaculture Institute International). In May 1980 Bill Mollison, his wife Philomena, Andrew Jeeves, Peter Moore (photographer) and Denis McCarthy began a three-month lecture tour of USA and Canada, during which he visited & gave talks at the International Tree Crops Institute (Miles & Libby Merwin, Winters, CA), Farallones Institute Rural Centre (Sonoma, CA), Integral Urban House (Berkeley, CA), Village Homes (Davis, CA), Appropriate Technology Group (Professor Isao Fujimoto, Davis CA), The Tree People (Andy Lipkis, Los Angeles, CA), Rural Education Center (Samuel Kaymen, Wilton NH, in 1983 called Stonyfield Farm), New Alchemy Institute (John & Nancy Todd, Woods Hole, MA), Institute for Local Self-Reliance (Washington, DC), Office of Appropriate Technology (Scott Sklar, now Professor Scott Sklar, Director George Washington Solar Institute, Washington, DC), and The Farm (Summertown, TN) He taught a three-week course at The Tree People in Los Angeles in 1981. In 1981, the first graduates of the permaculture design course (PDC) that he had helped to initiate, started to design permaculture systems in their respective communities. In this way, the philosophy of permaculture had begun to move beyond its original context in "land management" to cover most, if not all, aspects of human life.

In 1987, Mollison taught the first PDC course that was offered in India. By 2011 there had been over 300,000 such graduates practicing and teaching throughout the world.

He has been called the founder (Note: Although Joseph Russell Smith is not similarly referred to as the "father" of permaculture, some have offered the disclaimer that Smith, and not Mollison/Holmgren, was the first to write about a system of permanent agriculture in a book entitled Tree Crops, published in 1929, and earlier in 1910, in a book entitled Breeding and Use of Tree Crops. Others would argue, however, that such a disclaimer is based on a common misunderstanding of permaculture as a specific style of agriculture or gardening, rather than an ecologically-inspired design system. A food forest certainly can be one outcome of a permaculture design process, but so can an organic backyard garden. From the Wikipedia article on permaculture: "a system of agricultural and social design principles centered on simulating or directly utilizing the patterns and features observed in natural ecosystems.") and "father" of permaculture.

== Films ==
In the late 1980s and early 1990s, Mollison appeared in several video productions that helped popularize permaculture concepts.

- Permaculture: 50-minute Australian-made documentary from 1989 - see also Timestamped study notes for this video.
- In Grave Danger of Falling Food: Another 50-minute Australian-made documentary from 1989
- The Global Gardener (1991)
  - Part 1 The Tropics
  - Part 2 Drylands
  - Part 3 Cool Climates
  - Part 4 Urban Settings

== Selected bibliography ==
- Permaculture One: A Perennial Agriculture for Human Settlements, with David Holmgren. (Melbourne, Australia: Transworld Publishers, 1978) ISBN 978-0-938240-00-6
- Permaculture Two: Practical Design for Town and Country in Permanent Agriculture (Tasmania, Australia: Tagari Publications, 1979) ISBN 9780908228003
- Permaculture – A Designer's Manual (1988) ISBN 978-0-908228-01-0: has been used extensively as the text book and curriculum for the 72-hour Certificate course in Permaculture Design.
- Introduction to Permaculture, with Reny Mia Slay. (Tasmania, Australia: Tagari Publications, 1991; revised 1997; 2nd ed. 2011) ISBN 978-0-908228-08-9: in this book recognised that his original idea for permaculture had evolved, and a movement had grown, that could "spread to cover all human habitats; and the word was redefined as not just permanent agriculture, but also permanent culture."
- The Permaculture Book of Ferment and Human Nutrition (1993, Revised 2011) ISBN 978-0-908228-06-5
- Travels in Dreams: An Autobiography (1996) ISBN 978-0-908228-11-9

Articles

- Mollison, Bill (15–21 September 1978). "The One-Straw Revolution by Masanobu Fukuoka – book review". Nation Review. p. 18.

== See also ==
- Peter Andrews
- David Holmgren
- Albert Bates
- Masanobu Fukuoka
- Sepp Holzer
- Albert Howard
- Brad Lancaster
- Geoff Lawton
- G. Nammalvar
- Joseph Russell Smith
- P. A. Yeomans
- Toby Hemenway
