= East Lancaster Avenue Historic District =

Historic district in Pennsylvania, United States

- U.S. National Register of Historic Places
- U.S. Historic district
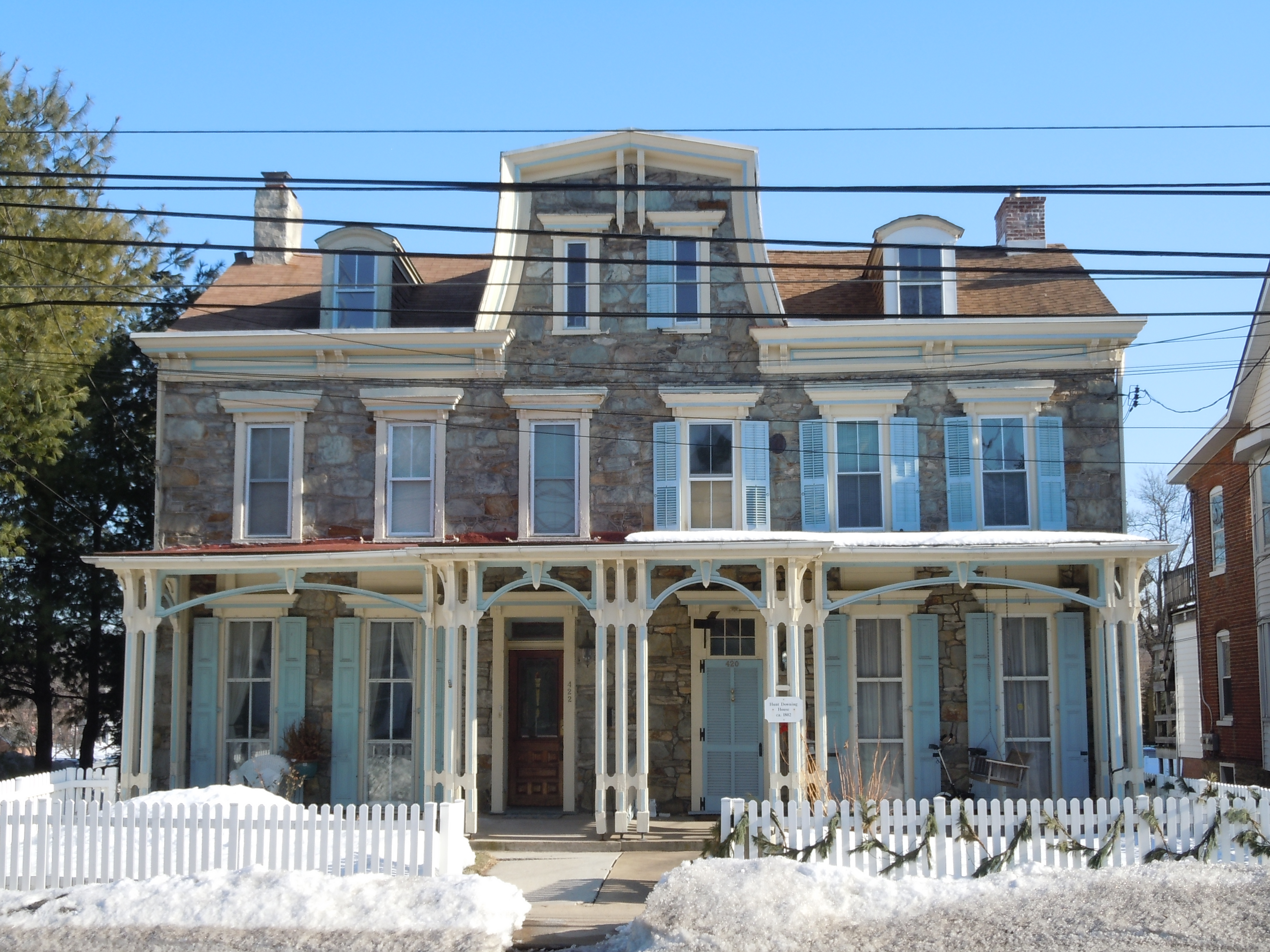
- Hunt-Downing House (c. 1802) in the East Lancaster Avenue Historic District, February 2011

- Location within Pennsylvania Location within the United States
- Location: An irregular pattern along E. Lancaster Ave., Downingtown, Pennsylvania
- Coordinates: 40°00′36″N 75°41′47″W
- Area: 51.3 acres (20.8 ha)
- Built: 1700
- Architectural style: Late Victorian, Georgian, Federal
- NRHP reference No.: 79002196
- Added to NRHP: December 11, 1979

East Lancaster Avenue Historic District is a national historic district located in Downingtown, Chester County, Pennsylvania. The district includes 121 contributing buildings and 1 contributing structure in Downingtown. The buildings include a number of notable examples of Georgian style dwellings dated to the early- to mid-18th century. Later notable dwellings are examples of the Federal and Victorian styles. Located in the district and separately listed are the Downingtown Log House and General Washington Inn.

It was added to the National Register of Historic Places in 1979.
