= John W. Hershey =

Pennsylvania pro-tree activist (1898–1967)

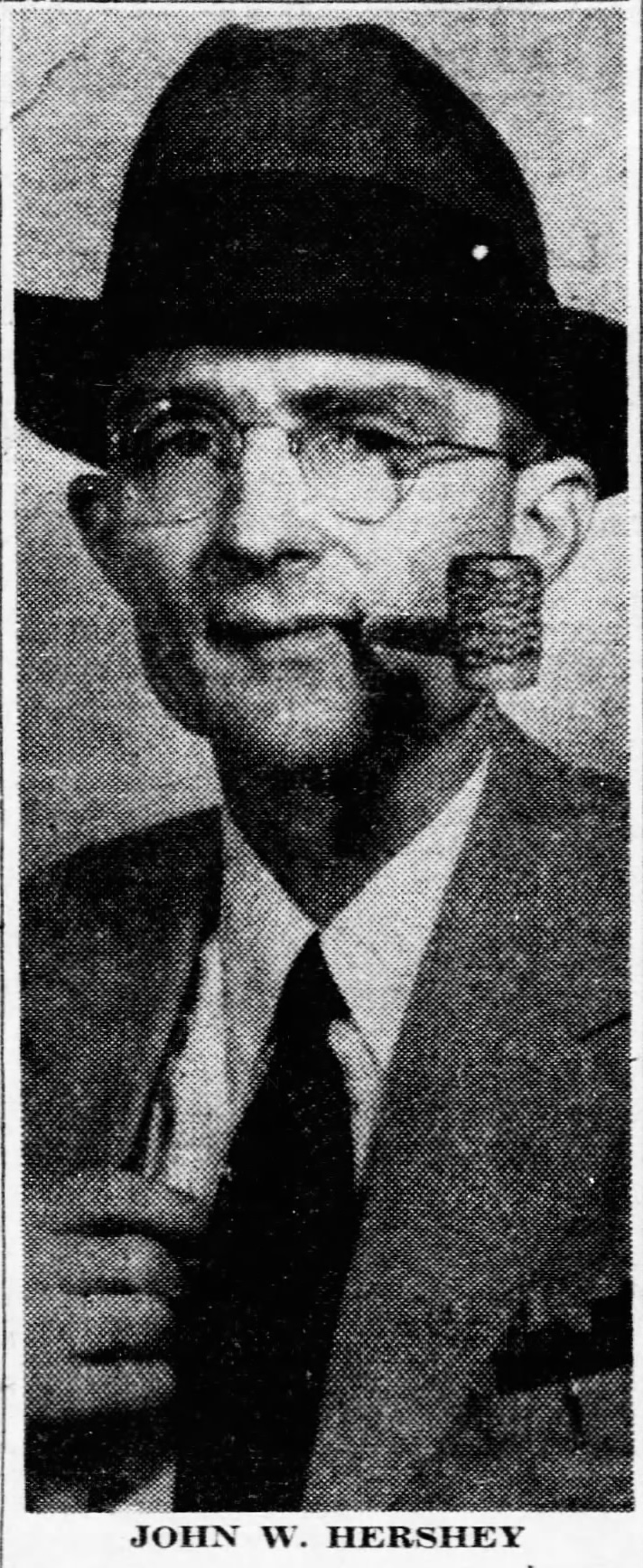
- Born: John Walter Hershey; February 5, 1898; Paradise, Pennsylvania, U.S.
- Died: September 7, 1967 (aged 69); Downington, Pennsylvania, U.S.
- Occupation(s): Nurseryman, agroforester

John Walter Hershey (February 5, 1898 – September 7, 1967) was a fruit and nut orchardist of Pennsylvania, United States. He worked for the U.S. government during the Dust Bowl, teaching farmers how to grow perennial food crops in order to diversity their incomes and their farm ecosystem. Many of the trees he grafted onto rootstock and planted in the vicinity of his Downington, Pennsylvania plant nursery remain standing and continue to produce fruit and nuts.

== Biography ==
Hershey was born in Paradise, Pennsylvania, in the Pennsylvania Dutch country. He was a distant cousin of Milton Hershey of chocolate bar fame. He grew up on a farm and obtained a high school education. In early adulthood he worked as a bond salesman, and a railroad man. His formal education as an agronomist was nil, he was self-educated, with support only from mentors. He started his career in agroforestry with J. F. Jones, who was the "originator of a method of grafting nut trees."

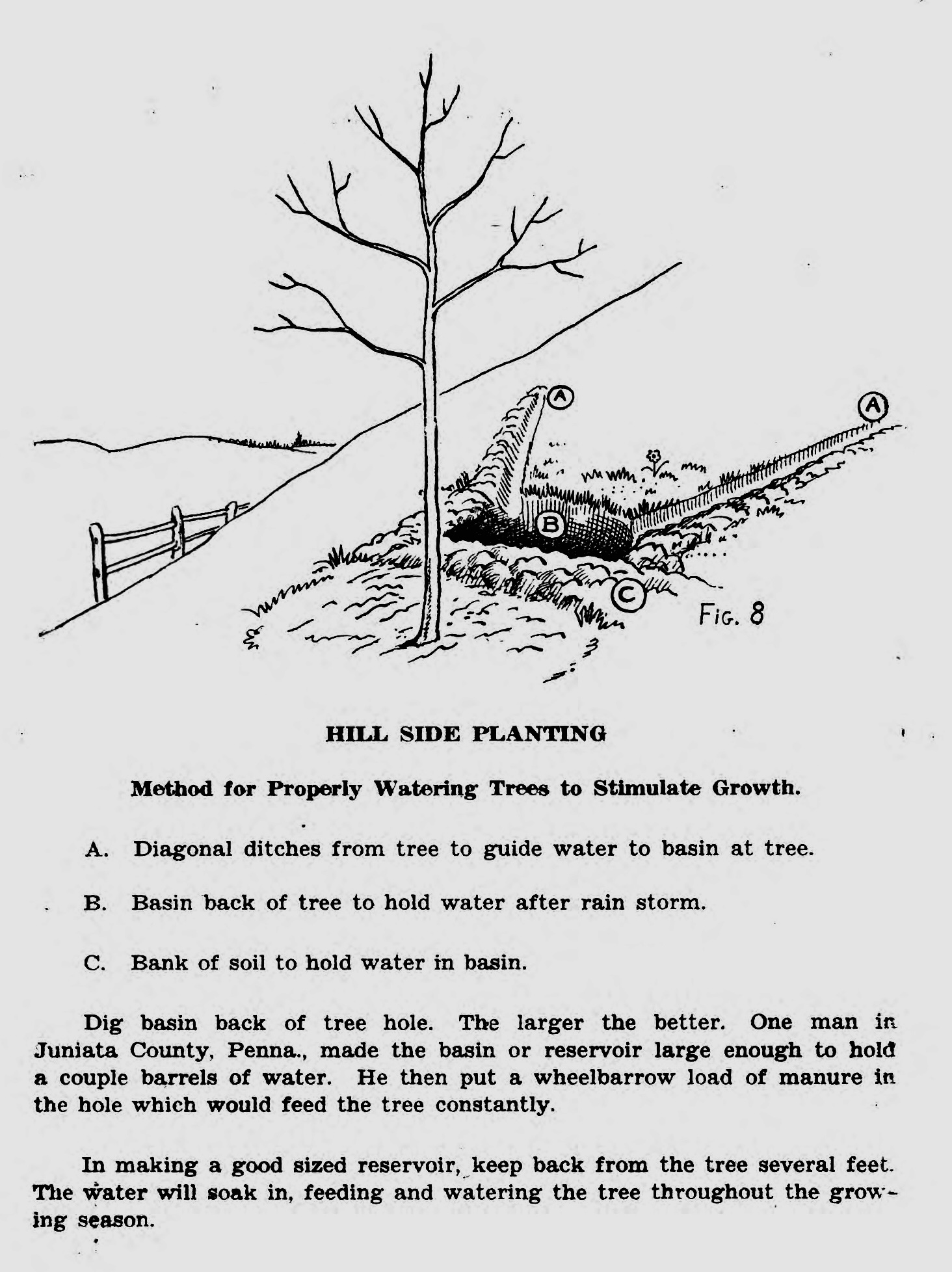
Diagram showing recommended earthworks and basin design to support tree seedlings planted on a slope

Hershey started his own nut tree nursery in 1922. His nursery was on the Lincoln Highway "just east of the borough line" in what he described as "picturesque Yankee town located in a long fertile valley fringed with tree-covered hills." At the nut tree nursery he worked on breeding and crossbreeding different strains of North American nut trees, for example working on a successful cross between a pecan and a shellbark hickory. He also edited a periodical called The Nut Grower's Guide. He also advocated for planting food sources for wildlife, suggesting that farmers start "food plants on their rough knolls, slopes, ditches and edges of woodland. Of the berries and fruits, the best are the chokecherries, red and black haws, crabapples, wild plum, cherry, pears, persimmons, honey locust, and many others." He reported high profits from the planting of walnuts and black walnuts, and recommended grafting English and Persian walnuts to American black walnut rootstock.

Hershey worked as an agroforestry project manager for the Tennessee Valley Authority under Franklin Roosevelt's New Deal. The Tennessee River watershed is home to a diverse array of hardwood trees, including several kinds of oaks, tulip poplar, swamp cypress, tupelo gums, and prior to the blight, the American chestnut, many of which were or are commercially significant species.

His residence was at Corner Ketch near Downingtown, Pennsylvania.

Hershey died in Downington at age 69 in 1967. He was posthumously described as "the only honest grafter of Chester County."

== Personal life ==
Hershey was a member of the Society of Friends Uwchlan Monthly Meeting.

== See also ==
- Aldo Leopold
- Euell Gibbons
- Edwin Way Teale
- Wendell Berry
- Johnny Appleseed
- Theodore Payne
- Brad Lancaster

== Secondary sources ==
- Clark, Thomas D. (1984). The Greening of the South: The Recovery of Land and Forest. New Perspectives on the South. Lexington, Kentucky: The University Press of Kentucky. doi:10.2307/j.ctt130j3x0. ISBN 978-0-8131-5807-5. JSTOR j.ctt130j3x0. LCCN 84017301. OCLC 760035547. OL 2968259W. Project MUSE book 37691.
- Hay, Elspeth (October 10, 2024). "100 years of tree crops in Pennsylvania". CAI.
- Hershey, Henry (1929b). Hershey Family History. Scottdale, Pennsylvania: Mennonite Publishing House. OL 18138375W – via Internet Archive, Allen County Public Library Genealogy Center.
- Hingston, Sandy (July 2018). "The Nut Case, or, The (Very Gentle) Fight to Save a Downingtown "Food Forest"". Philadelphia Magazine.
- Morgan, Kate (September 21, 2023). "Forests of the Future". Environment. Distillations Magazine. Philadelphia: Science History Institute.
- Pic, R. A. (2019). Rooting for the Riotous Life: An Ethnographic Analysis of Agroforestry in the Delaware Valley (B.A. Environmental Science thesis). Sarasota, Florida: New College of Florida – via University of Florida Digital Collections.
- Smith, J. Russell (1929). Tree Crops: A Permanent Agriculture. New York: Harcourt, Brace and company. LCCN 29003528. OCLC 1421922264. - also digitized by Soil and Health Library
- Huus Larsen Torben (2010). Enduring Pastoral: Recycling the Middle Landscape Ideal in the Tennessee Valley. BRILL. doi:10.1163/9789042030589_005. ISBN 978-90-420-3057-2.

== Primary sources ==
- Elfers, Zack (January 9, 2025) [February 1980]. "Interview with Elizabeth Hershey: Recorded February, 1980, with Greg Williams and Brian Caldwell, at Elizabeth's apartment at 434 East Ross Street, Lancaster, Pennsylvania". substack.com.
- Hershey, John W. (1929a). Save America's nut heritage: plan to plant a nut grove of our hardy grafted stock. Henry G. Gilbert Nursery and Seed Trade Catalog Collection. Downingtown, Pennsylvania: John W. Hershey Nut Tree Nurseries. doi:10.5962/bhl.title.144804.
- Hershey, John W. (n.d.) [1934 (?)]. Twenty Years' Progress in Northern Nut Culture. Downingtown, Pennsylvania: n.p. OCLC 45768193.
