= Natural sequence =

Natural sequence may refer to:

- Natural sequence of tenses, in grammar
- Natural Sequence Farming

== See also ==
- Natural number
- Sequence (disambiguation)
