= Downingtown, Pennsylvania =

Borough in Pennsylvania, US

- Borough
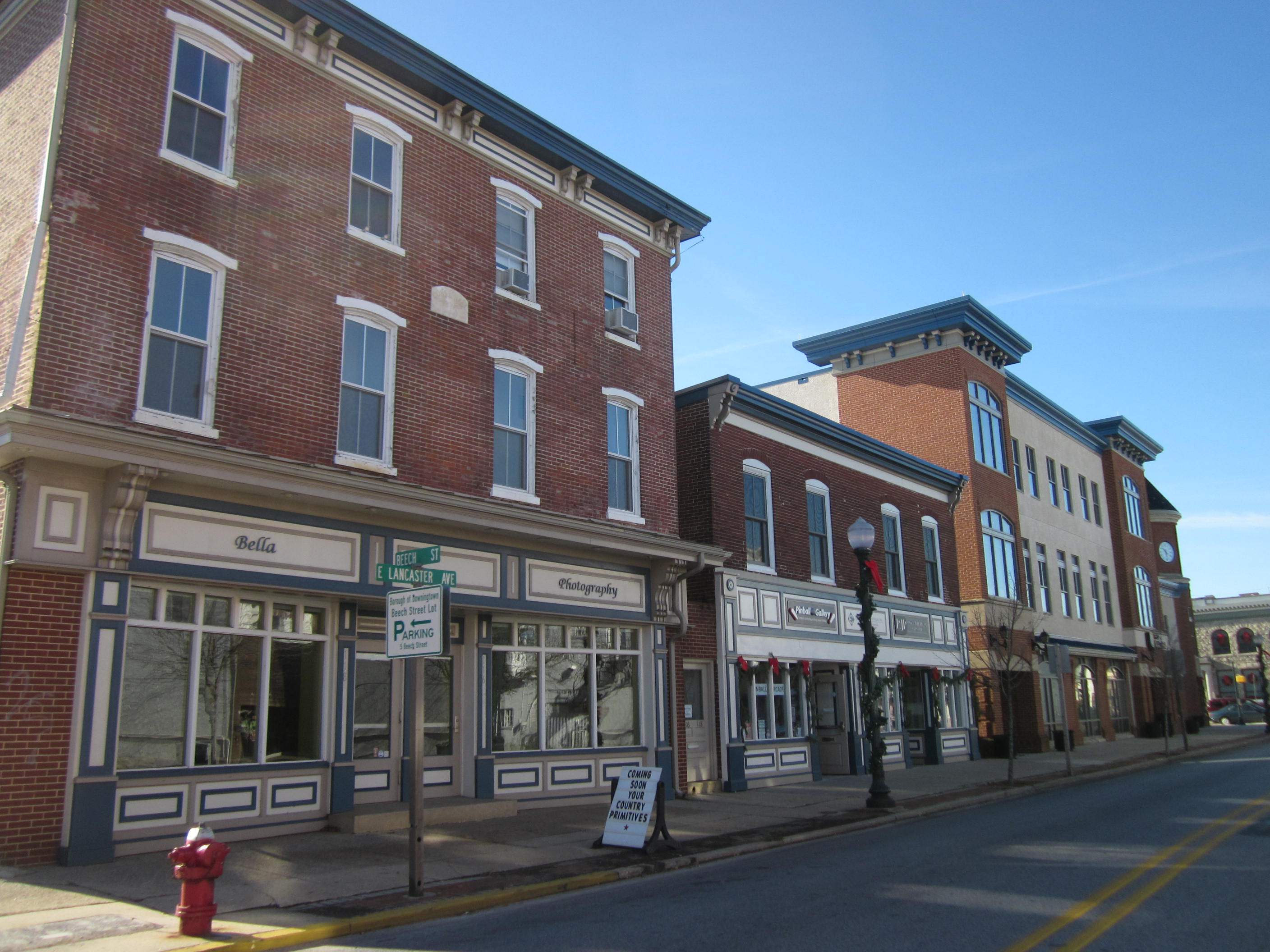
- Lancaster Avenue

- Seal

- Location in Chester County and the U.S. state of Pennsylvania

- Location in Pennsylvania Location in the United States
- Coordinates: 40°00′40″N 75°42′19″W
- Country: United States
- State: Pennsylvania
- County: Chester
- Incorporated: May 12, 1859
- Named for: Thomas Downing

Government
  - Mayor: Erica Deuso (D)

Area
  - Total: 2.22 sq mi (5.76 km^{2})
  - Land: 2.19 sq mi (5.67 km^{2})
  - Water: 0.035 sq mi (0.09 km^{2})
- Elevation: 239 ft (73 m)

Population (2020)
  - Total: 7,892
  - Density: 3,607.2/sq mi (1,392.73/km^{2})
- Time zone: UTC-5 (EST)
  - Summer (DST): UTC-4 (EDT)
- ZIP codes: 19335, 19372
- Area codes: 610, 484, and 835
- FIPS code: 42-19752
- Website: www.downingtown.org

Downingtown is a borough in Chester County, Pennsylvania, United States, 33 miles (53 km) west of Philadelphia. As of the 2020 census, it had a population of 7,898. Downingtown was settled by European colonists in 1716 and has a number of historic buildings and structures.

== History ==
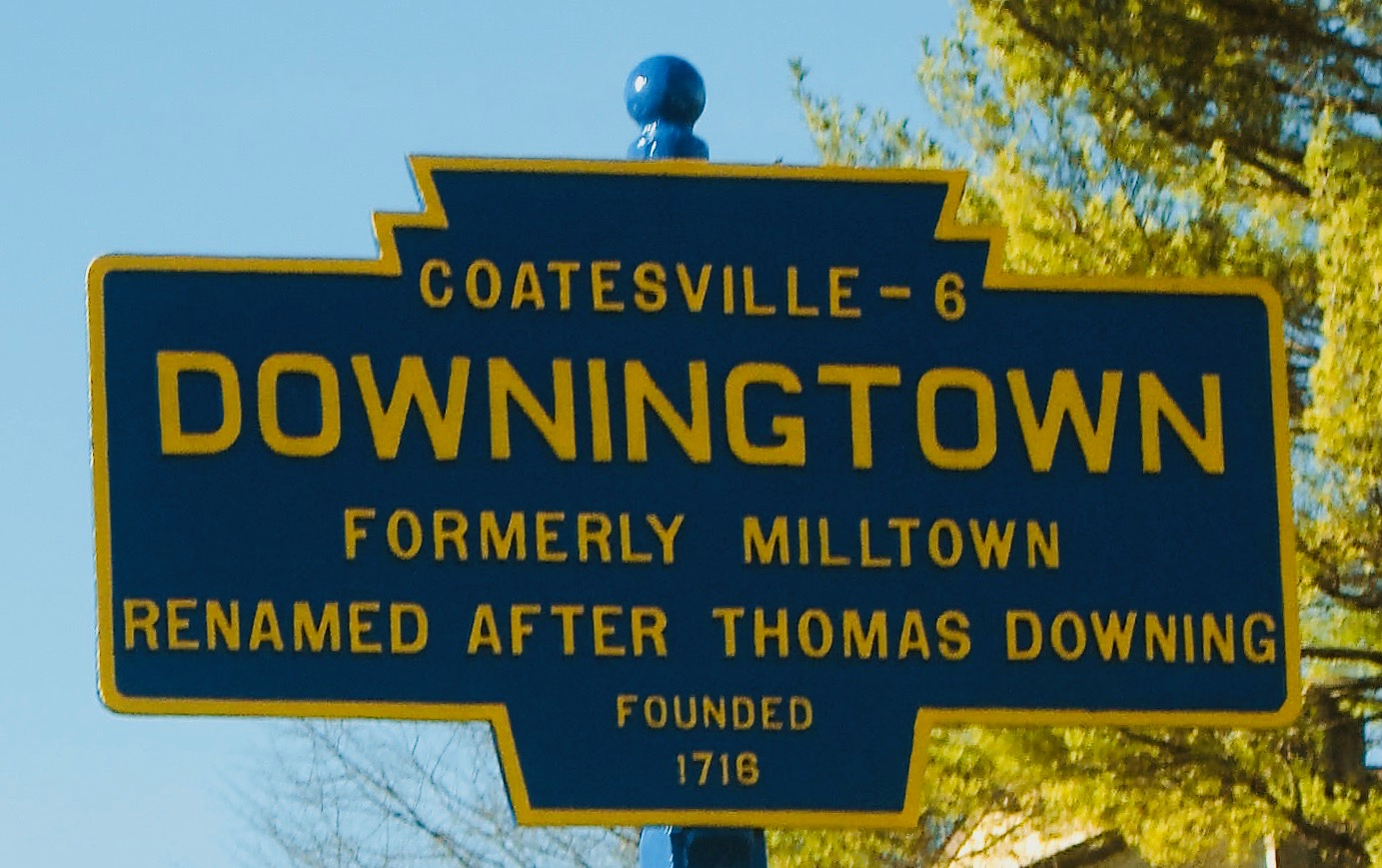
Keystone marker

The borough was originally named Milltown due to its number of mills along the East Branch Brandywine Creek, the first of which was founded by Daniel Butter. The Butter family also had paper mills in the area, and Frederick Bicking from Winterburg, Germany, was the patriarch of the Bicking paper families. Around the time of the American Revolution, Milltown became more commonly known as Downingtown after the prominent businessman Thomas Downing, a Quaker immigrant in 1717 from Bradninch, Devon, England, who owned a number of those mills. The burough was officially named Downingtown in 1812.

The borough is located along the Lincoln Highway (now part of U.S. Route 30), which runs from the East Coast to the West Coast. It was an early westward road in the wagon days as the Philadelphia and Lancaster Turnpike. The Lincoln Highway was the first paved road to cross the nation from the Atlantic to the Pacific Ocean. Construction of the Pennsylvania Turnpike started in the early 1940s and was completed in the early 1950s; it runs north of US 30, bypassing Downingtown.

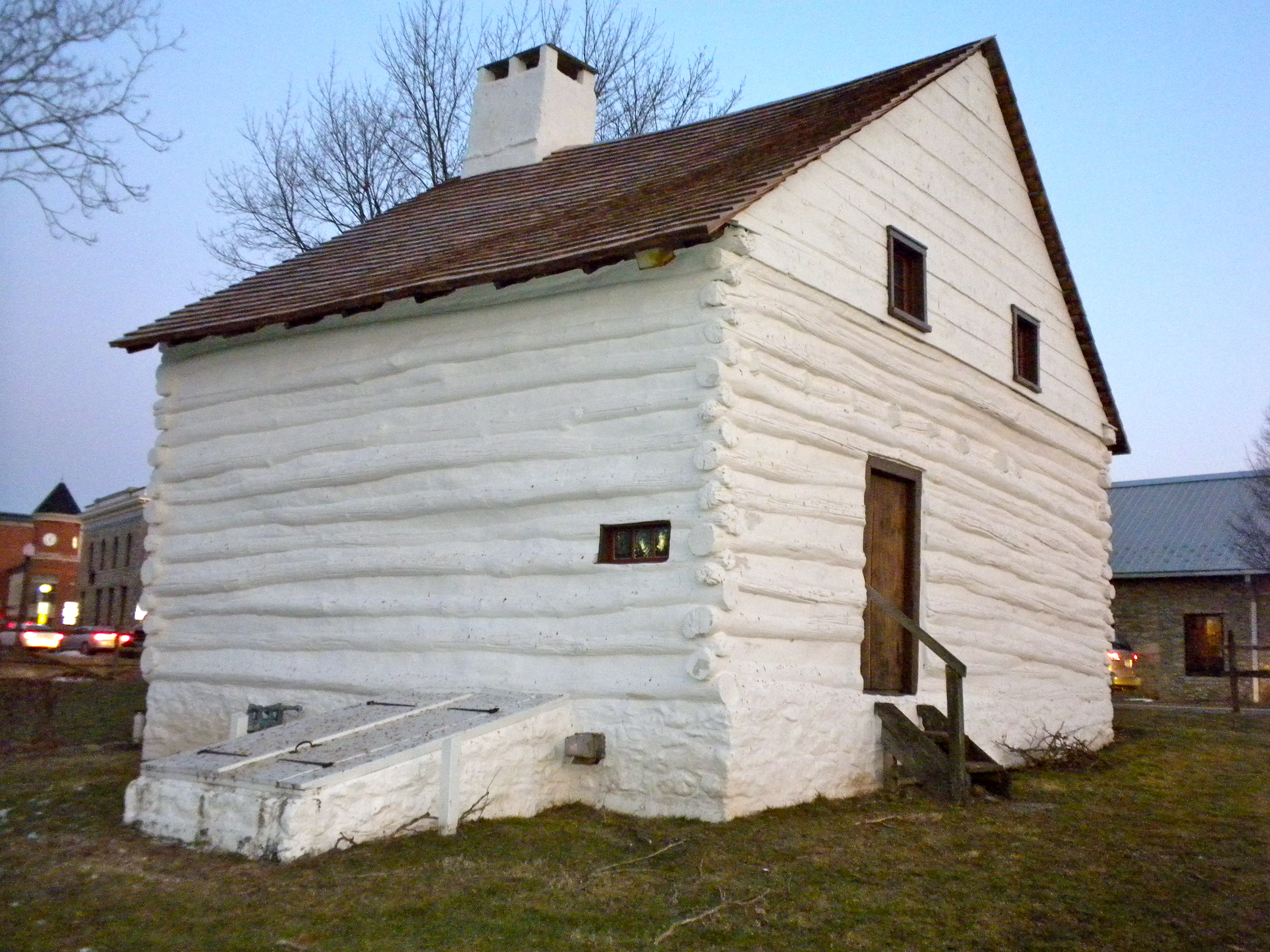
Downingtown Log House

Circa 1700, early English settlers built what has become known as the Downingtown Log House. In 1713, owner Joseph Hickman sold the 1 1/2-story, 21-foot, 9-inch × 25-foot structure to Thomas and Mary Moore. Thomas Moore moved from the Log House in 1729 and died in 1738.

Thomas Downing acquired the Log House in 1739. It remained in the Downing family until 1940, when Thomas W. Downing died and left it to the borough of Downingtown. The borough did some restoration work to the Downingtown Log House in 1947. It served as the home to the Downingtown Chamber of Commerce from 1950 until 1988. But the Log House was deteriorating as Route 30 had been built close to it. Located 18 inches (46 cm) below street level, the house suffered water damage due to runoff from Route 30 and vibration from traffic weakened the structure.

From 1988 until 1990, the Downingtown Historical Society relocated the house and did an extensive restoration with money raised for the project. It now sits approximately 70 feet (21 m) west of its original location, 22 feet (6.7 m) from the Route 30 sidewalk, and slightly above street level.

In 1904, John S. Trower and William A. Creditt, prominent black Philadelphians, founded the Downingtown Industrial and Agricultural School (DIAS) in Downingtown, to serve as an academic and vocational high school for African-American youths to prepare them for work. Creditt was pastor of the First African Baptist Church in Philadelphia, and Trower, a successful caterer and one of the wealthiest black businessmen in the nation, was a member of his congregation. Believing the North needed a school like the Tuskegee Institute, the men found land in Chester County and built the school on a 100-acre campus. They both served as principals until their respective deaths, both in 1921. Originally a private, non-denominational school, in 1907 DIAS began to be state supported. Students were admitted from major northeastern cities. Among its trustees in the early decades was Adam Clayton Powell, Sr., pastor of Abyssinian Baptist Church in Harlem, New York. The school operated until 1993. A new facility was constructed on the property and opened in 2002 as the Chester County campus of the Delaware County Community College.

The borough has initiated some widespread and continuing renovation in downtown, particularly to the streetscape; private owners have similarly renovated many commercial buildings. There has also been residential development on recovered industrial lands (brown fields) in the southeastern part of the borough. Downingtown is the location of some large regional and national businesses, including First National Bank of Chester County, and Victory Brewing Company, and formerly DNB First (acquired by S&T Bank in 2019).

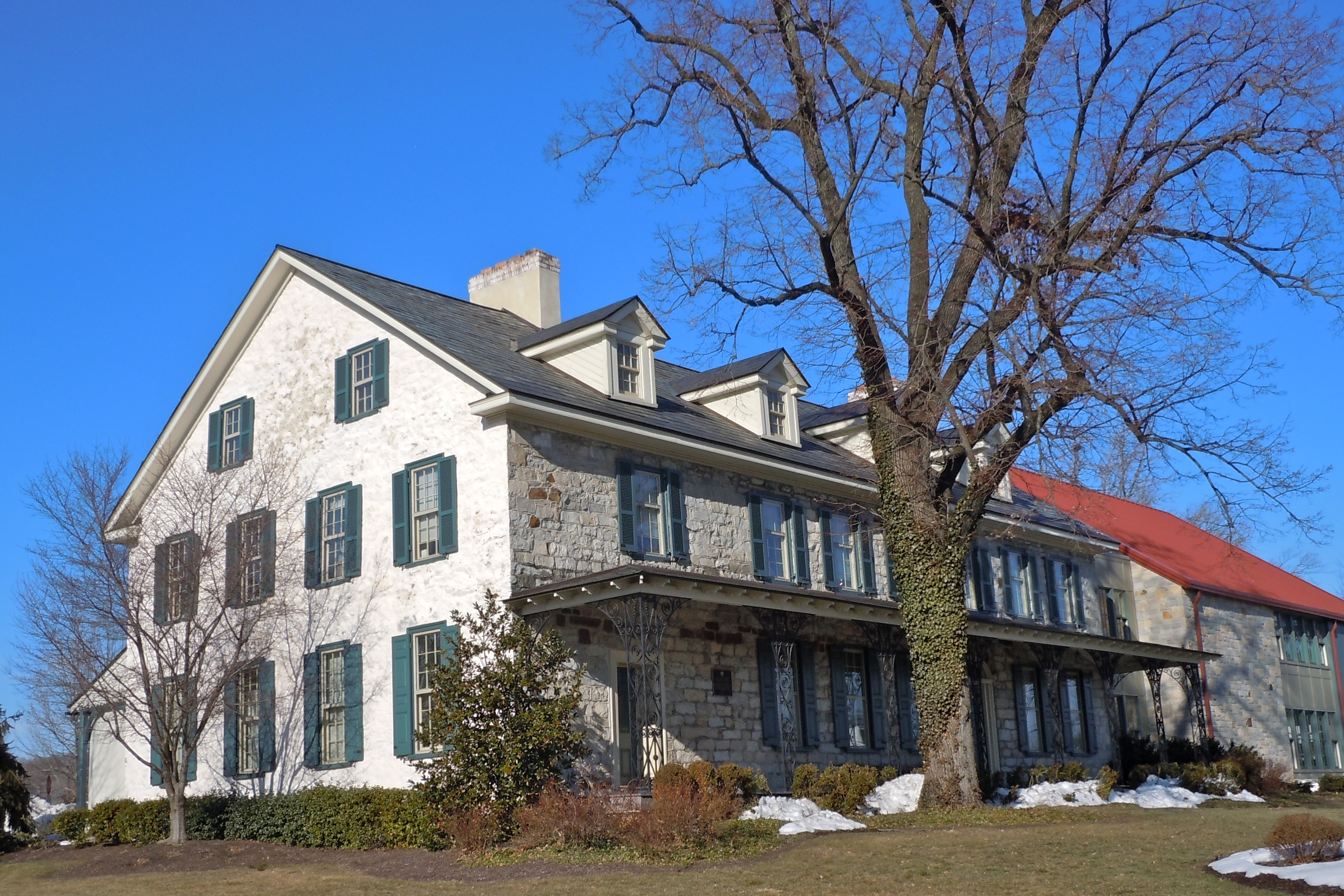
General Washington Inn

President Lincoln's funeral train passed through Downingtown. The famous Irish patriot and martyr Theobald Wolfe Tone briefly lived here in 1795.

The County Bridge No. 124, Downingtown Log House, East Lancaster Avenue Historic District, General Washington Inn, and Roger Hunt Mill are listed on the National Register of Historic Places.

On November 4, 2025, Downingtown elected Erica Deuso as mayor, becoming the first municipality in Pennsylvania to have an openly transgender mayor.

== In popular culture ==
- The 1958 movie The Blob was filmed in and around Downingtown. The diner featured in the movie, then called the "Downingtown Diner", was sold and transported to another state and has been replaced with a similar 1950s style diner. Continuing to be advertised as the "home of the Blob", it has changed ownership numerous times over the years but is still open as of 2025.
- The global pretzel shop chain, Auntie Anne's, was founded in a stall in Downingtown's farmer's market in 1988. The chain is now a global company with 1,000 stores and $375 million in annual sales.
- The widely-distributed craft brewer Victory Brewing Company is located and headquartered in Downingtown. It was founded in a vacated Pepperidge Farm factory on Acorn Lane in 1996.

== Geography ==
Downingtown is located at 40°0′23″N 75°42′22″W (40.006406, −75.706239).

According to the United States Census Bureau, the borough has a total area of 2.2 square miles (5.7 km^{2}), all land.

== Demographics ==
Historical population
Census	Pop.	Note	%±
1860	761		—
1870	1,077		41.5%
1880	1,480		37.4%
1890	1,920		29.7%
1900	2,133		11.1%
1910	3,326		55.9%
1920	4,024		21.0%
1930	4,548		13.0%
1940	4,645		2.1%
1950	4,948		6.5%
1960	5,598		13.1%
1970	7,437		32.9%
1980	7,650		2.9%
1990	7,749		1.3%
2000	7,589		−2.1%
2010	7,891		4.0%
2020	7,892		0.0%
2021 (est.)	8,162	▲	3.4%

At the 2010 census, the borough was 76.0% non-Hispanic White, 12.0% Black or African American, 0.1% Native American, 2.7% Asian, 0.1% Native Hawaiian or other Pacific Islander, and 3.2% were two or more races. 7.2% of the population were of Hispanic or Latino ancestry.

As of the census of 2000, there were 7,589 people, 3,059 households, and 1,853 families residing in the borough. The population density was 3,473.2 inhabitants per square mile (1,341.0/km^{2}). There were 3,197 housing units at an average density of 1,463.2 per square mile (564.9/km^{2}). The racial makeup of the borough was 83.65% White, 10.79% African American, 0.12% Native American, 2.29% Asian, 0.04% Pacific Islander, 1.44% from other races, and 1.67% from two or more races. Hispanic or Latino of any race were 3.53% of the population.

Downingtown has a large population of residents that have Italian ancestry.

There were 3,059 households, out of which 31.4% had children under the age of 18 living with them, 42.8% were married couples living together, 12.9% had a female householder with no husband present, and 39.4% were non-families. 32.2% of all households were made up of individuals, and 11.2% had someone living alone who was 65 years of age or older. The average household size was 2.40 and the average family size was 3.09.

The borough's population was spread out, with 25.3% under the age of 18, 8.7% from 18 to 24, 32.6% from 25 to 44, 19.2% from 45 to 64, and 14.1% who were 65 years of age or older. The median age was 35 years. For every 100 females there were 89.9 males. For every 100 females age 18 and over, there were 87.4 males.

The median income for a household in the borough was $45,979, and the median income for a family was $53,468. Males had a median income of $38,893 versus $29,284 for females. The per capita income for the borough was $21,634. About 3.0% of families and 4.8% of the population were below the poverty line, including 5.2% of those under age 18 and 5.3% of those age 65 or over.

== Climate ==
According to the Köppen Climate Classification system, Downingtown has a humid continental climate, abbreviated "Dfa" on climate maps.

Climate data for Downingtown, Pennsylvania
Month	Jan	Feb	Mar	Apr	May	Jun	Jul	Aug	Sep	Oct	Nov	Dec	Year
Mean daily maximum °C (°F)	4 (39)	6 (42)	11 (51)	16 (61)	22 (72)	27 (80)	29 (85)	28 (83)	24 (76)	18 (65)	12 (53)	7 (44)	16 (61)
Mean daily minimum °C (°F)	−6 (21)	−5 (23)	−1 (30)	4 (39)	9 (48)	15 (59)	18 (64)	17 (62)	12 (54)	6 (42)	1 (34)	−3 (26)	8 (46)
Average precipitation mm (inches)	91 (3.6)	84 (3.3)	97 (3.8)	94 (3.7)	99 (3.9)	110 (4.5)	110 (4.4)	110 (4.5)	94 (3.7)	84 (3.3)	84 (3.3)	97 (3.8)	1,160 (45.8)
Source: Weatherbase

== Education ==
=== Public education ===
Downingtown Area School District (DASD) is the school district operating schools serving the borough. Four elementary schools serve sections of the borough limits: Beaver Creek (in the borough limits), East Ward (in the borough limits), Bradford Heights, and Uwchlan Hills.There are many more in the immediate surrounding area such as: Brandywine Wallace, Lionville, Shamona Creek, Pickering Valley, Springton Manor, and West Bradford. All of the borough goes through the Marsh Creek Sixth Grade Center. And meanwhile, much of the borough is served by Downingtown Middle School and Downingtown West High School (the latter is mostly in the borough) while some eastern parts are served by Lionville Middle School and Downingtown East High School.

Other area schools:

- Downingtown S.T.E.M. Academy (in the borough limits)

=== Other schools ===
The Roman Catholic Archdiocese of Philadelphia has two schools in Downingtown Borough:

- Bishop Shanahan High School
- St Joseph School Parish School K-8 (in the borough limits)

————————————————————————————————————————————————————

- Chester County Intermediate Unit houses several offices and special services in Downingtown.
- Collegium Charter School.
- Creative Kids Of Downingtown
- Devereux Day School-cares (in the borough limits)
- St Joseph School Parish School (in the borough limits)
- Kindercare Learning Center
- 21st Century Cyber Charter School

=== Tertiary education ===
Delaware County Community College operates the Brandywine Campus in the Downingtown borough limits.

Additionally it operates the Downingtown Campus in East Brandywine Township, on the site of the former Downingtown Industrial and Agricultural School.

== Infrastructure ==
=== Roads ===
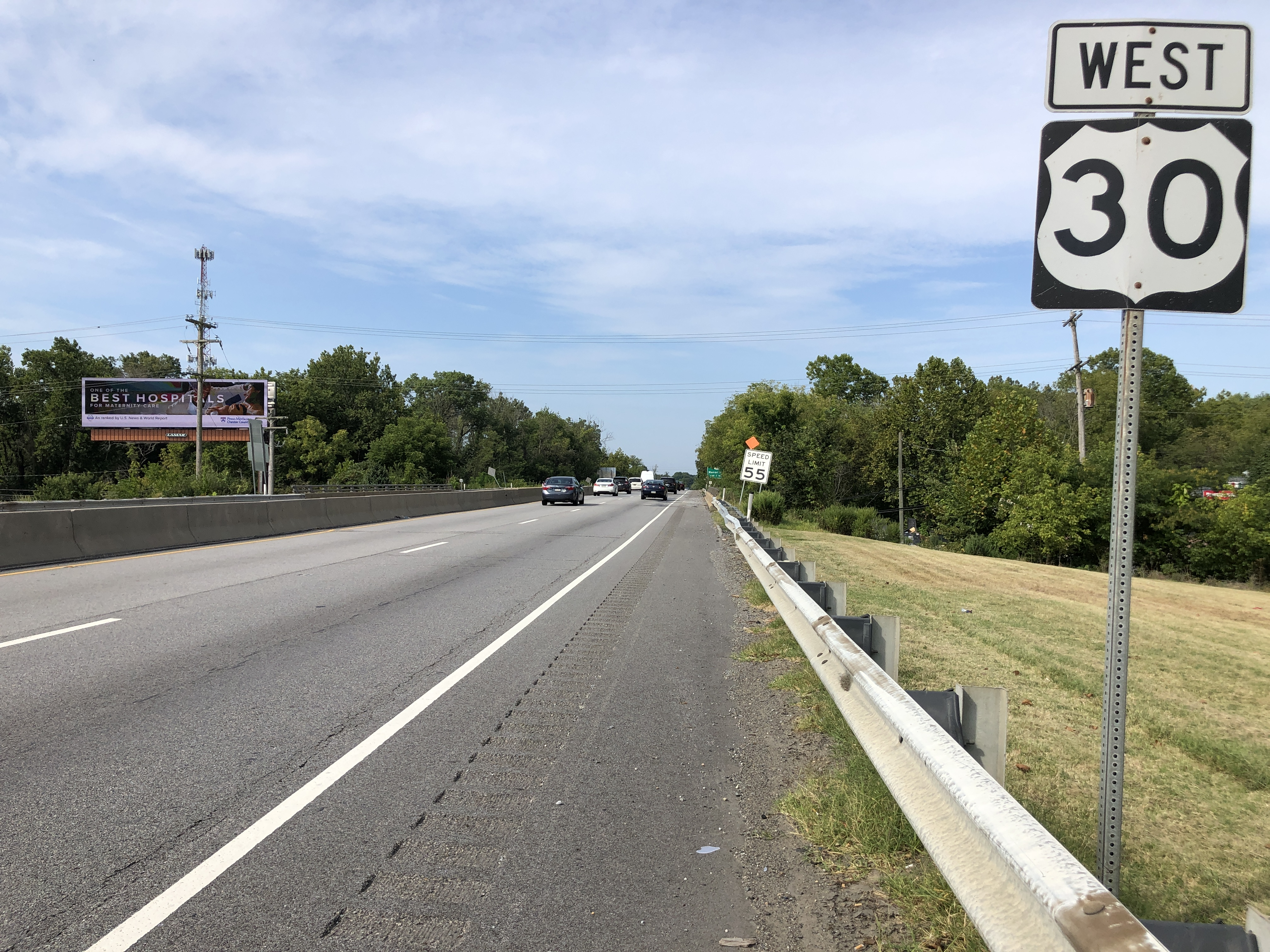
US 30 westbound in Downingtown

As of 2012, there were 22.32 miles (35.92 km) of public roads in Downingtown, of which 6.36 miles (10.24 km) were maintained by Pennsylvania Department of Transportation (PennDOT) and 15.96 miles (25.69 km) were maintained by the borough.

U.S. Route 30 is the main highway serving Downingtown. It follows the Coatesville-Downingtown Bypass on an east-west alignment across the northern tip of the borough. U.S. Route 30 Business follows the old alignment of US 30 through the heart of the borough along Lancaster Avenue. U.S. Route 322 also runs through the heart of the borough, following a northwest-to-southeast alignment via Manor Avenue, Lancaster Avenue and Brandywine Avenue and running concurrently with US 30 Business for a short stretch. Pennsylvania Route 113 starts at US 30 Business in the central part of the borough and heads north along Uwchlan Avenue. Finally, Pennsylvania Route 282 also starts at US 30 Business in the core of the borough and heads northward along Green Street, Pennsylvania Avenue and Wallace Avenue.

=== Transit ===
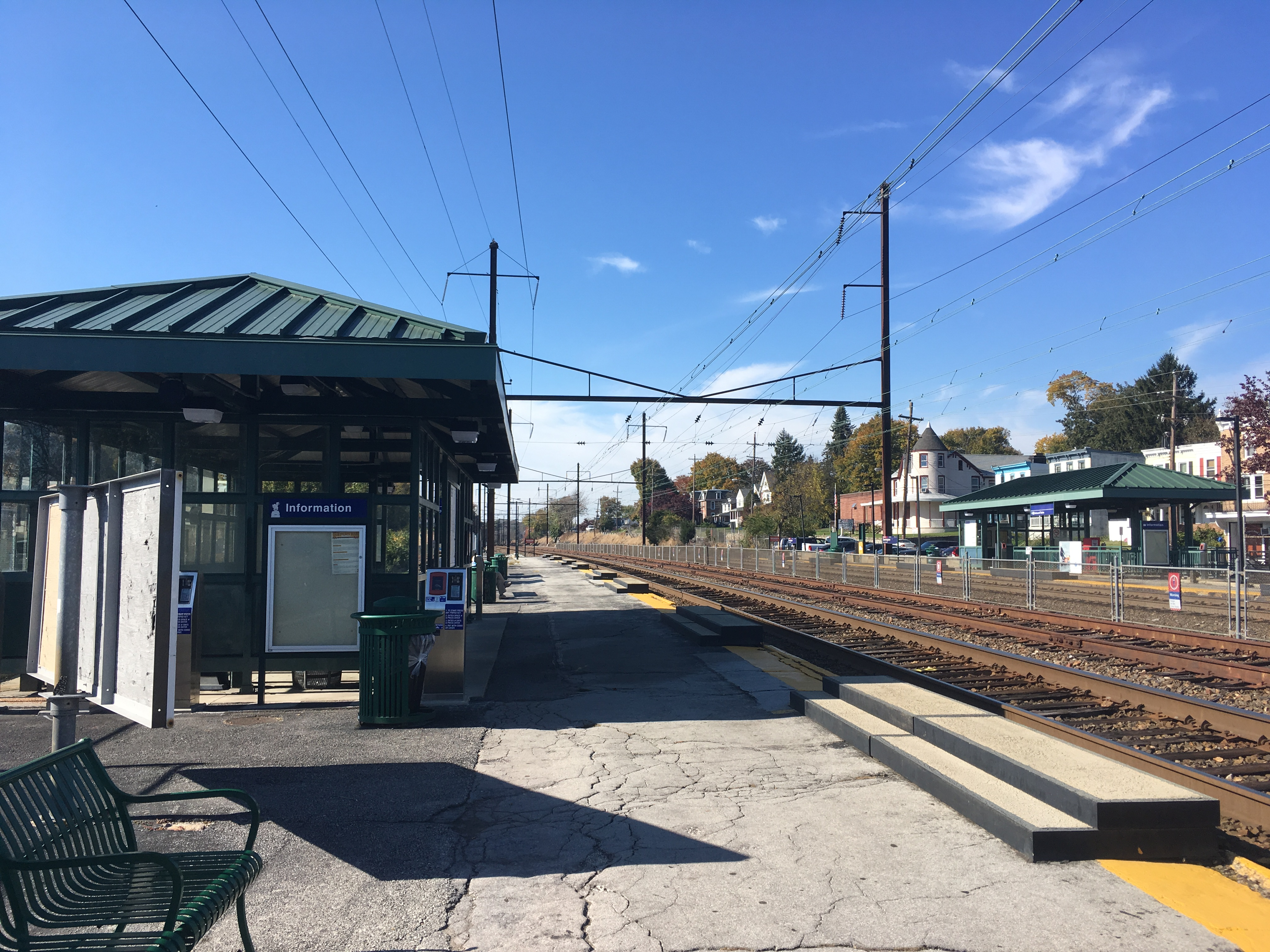
Downingtown Station, which serves SEPTA and Amtrak trains

Downingtown station is located along the Lincoln Highway and is served by both SEPTA Regional Rail's Paoli/Thorndale Line and Amtrak's Keystone Service. The town is also served by SEPTA Suburban Bus Route 135 between Coatesville and West Chester.

== Notable people ==
- Adriana Chechik (born 1991), pornographic actress
- Dave Days (born 1991), musician and internet personality
- Erica Deuso, politician and first openly transgender mayor in Pennsylvania
- John P. Edge (1822–1904), Pennsylvania state politician
- John W. Hershey (1898–1967), fruit and nut orchardist
- Will Howard (born 2001), college football player, NFL player drafted by the Pittsburgh Steelers in the 2025 NFL Draft
- Tyler Kroft (born 1992), National Football League (NFL) player
- Jeff Parke (born 1982), soccer player who represented the United States national team
- Thomas Buchanan Read (1822–1872), poet and painter
- Zack Steffen (born 1995), soccer player who represented the United States national team
- Miles Teller (born 1987), actor
- Elijah Wilkinson (born 1995), NFL player
