= Visionaries: Small Solutions to Enormously Large Problems =

- Genre: Documentary film
- Written by: Tony Gailey; Julian Russell
- Directed by: Tony Gailey; Julian Russell
- Composer: Derek Williams (Ep.1)
- Country of origin: Australia
- Original language: English
- No. of series: 2
- No. of episodes: 7

Production
- Running time: 53 minutes (approx.)
- Production company: 220 Productions

Original release
- Network: Australian Broadcasting Corporation
- Release: 1989 – 1993

Related
- Global Gardener

Visionaries: Small Solutions to Enormously Large Problems is an Australian television series of documentary films written and directed by Tony Gailey and Julian Russell. Each of the seven films examines the work of a living person who is a revolutionary thinker in their field. What the subjects have in common is a creative contribution to humanity that has the potential to elicit a paradigm shift. They either apply a pragmatic conceptual framework for addressing global socioeconomic problems, or a radical scientific model for understanding a system.

The Australian Broadcasting Corporation premiered Visionaries in 1989; Channel 4 in the United Kingdom began transmitting the series in the following year. The series was produced by 220 Productions with funding from Film Finance Corporation Australia.

The individual films have been published on VHS home video and, in some cases, DVD.

== Episodes ==
No. in series	Title	Original release date
1	"In Grave Danger of Falling Food"	1989
Bill Mollison demonstrates permaculture and discusses its implementation for food security.
2	"Barefoot Economist"	1989
Manfred Max Neef and "barefoot economics"
3	"The Man Who Named the World"	1990
James Lovelock and the Gaia hypothesis
4	"Declaration of a Heretic"	1990
Jeremy Rifkin on how science and technology affect society
5	"Midwives… Lullabies… and Mother Earth"	1993
This film explores Michel Odent's work championing midwifery, home birth, natural childbirth, and the needs of newborns and mothers. It won the Silver Apple award at the National Educational Film & Video Festival in Oakland, California.
6	"Quest for Life: A Year with Petrea King"	1993
Petrea King is a cancer survivor and founder of the Quest for Life Foundation. After learning how facing death changes a person, she began counseling people diagnosed with terminal illness. The film was honored at the American Psychological Association Film Festival.
7	"Democratic Allsorts"	1993
Frances Moore Lappé describes how the economically powerful control people by engineering food scarcity.
