= Global Gardener =

- Genre: Documentary series
- Directed by: Tony Gailey; Julian Russell
- Presented by: Bill Mollison
- Country of origin: Australia
- Original language: English
- No. of seasons: 1
- No. of episodes: 4

Production
- Producer: Julian Russell
- Editor: Simon Dibbs
- Running time: 28 min. × 4 eps.

Related
- Visionaries: Small Solutions to Enormously Large Problems

Global Gardener is a documentary film series about the permaculture approach to sustainable agriculture. The series was produced by Julian Russell for the Australian Broadcasting Corporation; it premiered on Australian television in 1991.

Bill Mollison, author of Permaculture: A Designers' Manual (1988), presents the series' four episodes—"In the Tropics", "Dry Lands", "Cool Climates", and "Urban"—each of which addresses the application of permaculture principles in a different environmental context.

The series is distributed on DVD and VHS videotape by Bullfrog Films.

Before Global Gardener, writer–directors Tony Gailey and Julian Russell made Bill Mollison and permaculture the subject of another documentary film, "In Grave Danger of Falling Food", in which Mollison proposes permaculture as a means to food security. The film was transmitted on ABC in Australia in 1989, as the first episode of Gailey and Russell's documentary series Visionaries: Small Solutions to Enormously Large Problems.
