= Peter Andrews (agricultural pioneer) =

Australian racehorse breeder and grazier

Peter Andrews OAM (born 1940) is an Australian racehorse breeder and grazier from Bylong in the Upper Hunter Valley of New South Wales. He is known for his pioneering work in landscape regeneration.

== Agricultural pioneer ==
Andrews is the inventor of the Natural Sequence Farming method. He is acknowledged as having converted his degraded high-salinity land at Tarwyn Park into a fertile, drought-resistant estate. His techniques run counter to prevailing accepted practices, and for 30 years his techniques were rejected by government authorities. Peter Andrews is the author of a best-selling book on his methods, entitled Back from the Brink: How Australia's Landscape can be Saved. He also has written a book called Beyond the Brink that further explains his theories about water movement in the Australian landscape with the additional subjects of global warming and GMO usage and how this affects soil and the environment.

== See also ==
- Bill Mollison co-creator for the permaculture design system
- P. A. Yeomans creator of the keyline design
- Allan Savory Rotational grazing pioneer
