= Erica Deuso =

American politician (born 1980)

- Deuso in 2026

Mayor of Downingtown, Pennsylvania
- Incumbent
- Assumed office January 5, 2026
- Preceded by: Phil Dague

Personal details
- Born: August 27, 1980 (age 46) South Burlington, Vermont, U.S.
- Party: Democratic Party
- Spouse: Michael Obert
- Education: Drexel University (BS, MBA)

Erica Michelle Deuso (born August 27, 1980) is an American politician who has served as the mayor of Downingtown, Pennsylvania, since 2026. With her election, she became the first openly transgender mayor in Pennsylvania.

== Career ==
Deuso works as a personnel and process quality manager for Johnson & Johnson.

In May 2025, she won the Democratic primary for the mayoral race in Downingtown, Pennsylvania, defeating fellow Democrat Barry Cassidy. Deuso ran against Republican Richard Bryant in the general election, which she won with 64% of the vote, becoming the first openly transgender person elected mayor in Pennsylvania.

Deuso currently serves on the Chester County Democratic Committee, and also sits on the board of Emerge Pennsylvania, an organization that promotes female political candidates.

== Personal life ==
Deuso is originally from South Burlington, Vermont. She is a graduate of South Western High School in Hanover, Pennsylvania, and attended Drexel University, obtaining a Bachelor of Science degree in 2003 and a Master of Business Administration degree in 2012. She moved to Downingtown in 2007.
