= County Bridge No. 124 =

- U.S. National Register of Historic Places
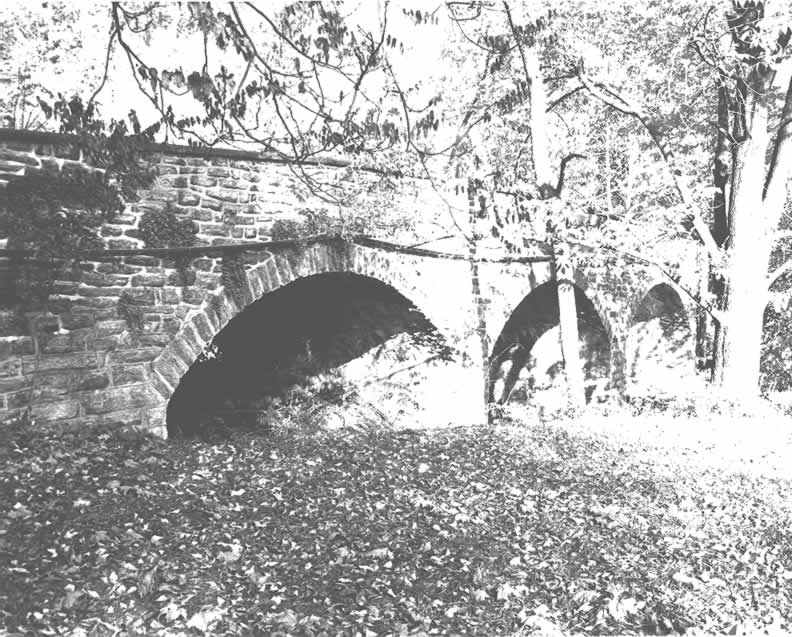
- County Bridge No. 124, 1982

- Location within Pennsylvania Location within the United States
- Location: Edges Mill Road over Beaver Creek, near Downingtown, Pennsylvania
- Coordinates: 40°0′38″N 75°44′39″W
- Area: less than one acre
- Built: 1916; 110 years ago
- Built by: Dunleavy Bros.
- Architectural style: Three span arch
- MPS: Highway Bridges Owned by the Commonwealth of Pennsylvania, Department of Transportation TR
- NRHP reference No.: 88000760
- Added to NRHP: June 22, 1988

County Bridge No. 124 is a historic stone arch bridge located in Caln Township, Chester County, Pennsylvania. It spans Beaver Creek.

== Description ==
It has three arch spans, each of which are 24 feet (7.3 m) long.

== History ==
The bridge was constructed in 1916 of squared ashlar.

It was listed on the National Register of Historic Places in 1988.
