= Roger Hunt Mill =

- U.S. National Register of Historic Places
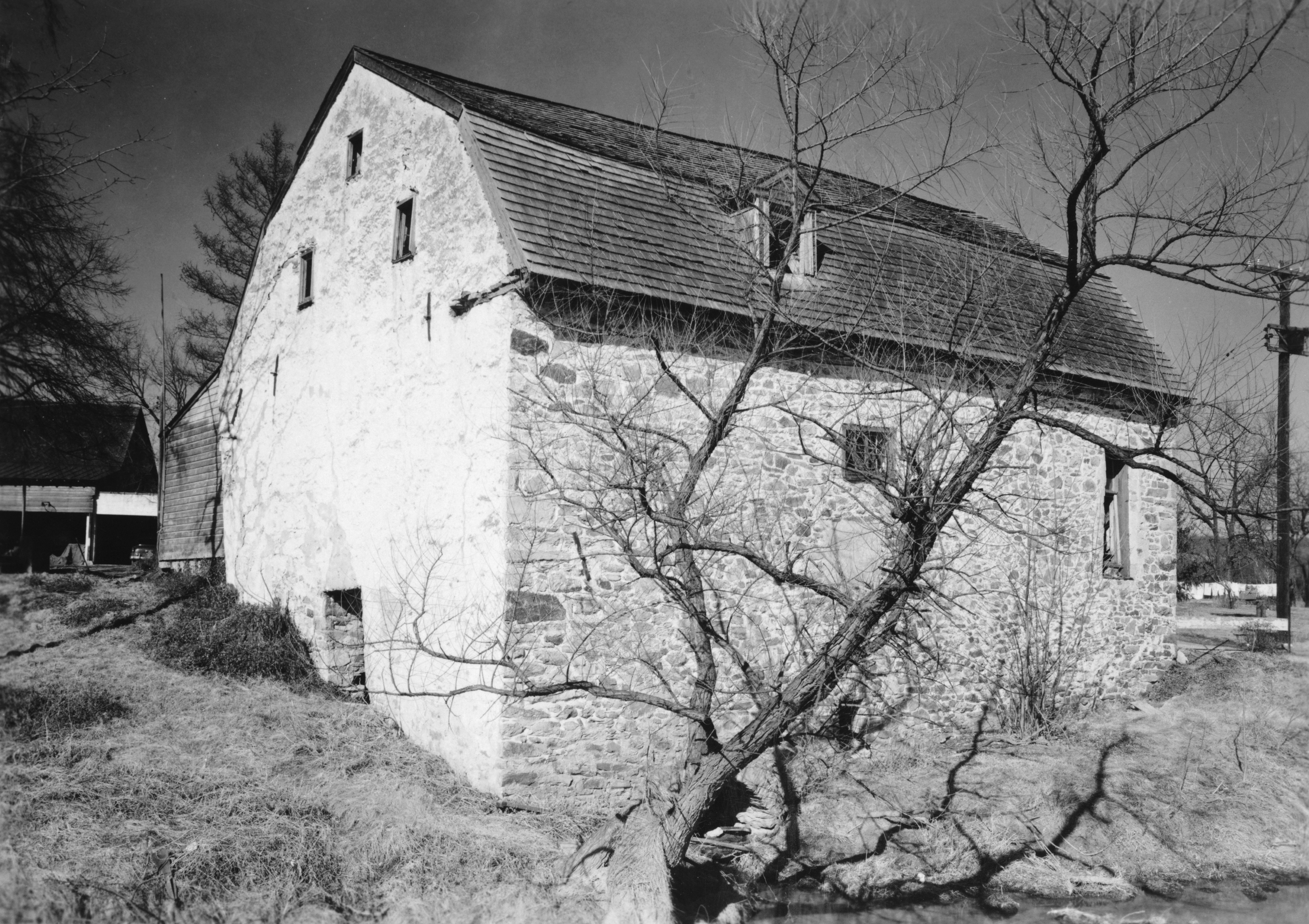
- Roger Hunt Mill, HABS Photo, 1958

- Location within Pennsylvania Location within the United States
- Location: Race Street, Downingtown, Pennsylvania
- Coordinates: 40°0′29″N 75°42′41″W
- Area: 6.4 acres (2.6 ha)
- Built: c. 1740, 1759, c. 1850
- Architectural style: Greek Revival, Queen Anne, Georgian
- NRHP reference No.: 80003457
- Added to NRHP: January 4, 1980

The Roger Hunt Mill is a historic, American grist mill complex that is located in Downingtown, Chester County, Pennsylvania.

It was added to the National Register of Historic Places in 1980.

== History and architectural features ==
The mill was built in 1759, and is a two-story, stone structure with a gambrel roof that measures 30 feet 6 inches (9.30 m) by 48 feet (15 m). It has a one-story frame addition. The main house was built circa 1740 and is a two-story, five-bay, stone structure with Georgian design details. The house has a 2 1/2-story, stone extension that was built circa 1850.

Other contributing buildings are the two-story, Queen Anne-style carriage house, a 2 1/2-story, Greek Revival-style tenant house (c. 1850), and a 1 1/2-story stone miller's house.
