= American Rainwater Catchment Systems Association =

American non-profit organization

- Abbreviation: ARCSA
- Founded: 1994; 32 years ago
- Founder: Dr. Hari Krishna
- Type: Nonprofit organization
- Legal status: 501(c)(3) organization
- Headquarters: Tempe, Arizona, United States
- Executive Director: Jeff Falcusan
- Key people: David Crawford (president), Mark Pape (vice-president)
- Website: www.arcsa.org

The American Rainwater Catchment Systems Association (ARCSA) is an American non-profit association founded by Dr. Hari Krishna in 1994, focused on rainwater awareness and to promote sustainable rainwater harvesting (RWH) practices in the United States and around the world.

ARCSA's efforts include: creating a favorable regulatory atmosphere, creating a resource pool and educating professionals and the general public regarding safe rainwater harvesting design, installation and maintenance practices. It has more than 1,500 members consisting of both manufacturers as well as dealers/distributors of equipment.

== History ==
The association was founded by Dr. Hari Krishna in 1994.

In 2014, ARCSA created a White House petition to stimulate the rainwater-harvesting industry. While the petition didn't receive the 100,000 votes in 3 months needed to move to the next stage, ARCSA used this as a platform to begin a petition with Change.org to create an International Rainwater Harvesting Day.

In 2015, ARCSA merged with the Canadian Association of Rainwater Management (CANARM) and will continue as a North American association.

In 2016, it merged with The Texas Rainwater Catchment Systems Association (TRCA) and renamed to ARCSA international.

In July 2024, the United States General Services Administration accepted a standard for rainwater collection in public buildings created by ARCSA with the help of IAPMO Group know as ARCSA/ASPE/ANSI Standard 63-2020:Rainwater Catchment Systems.
