= Natural Sequence Farming =

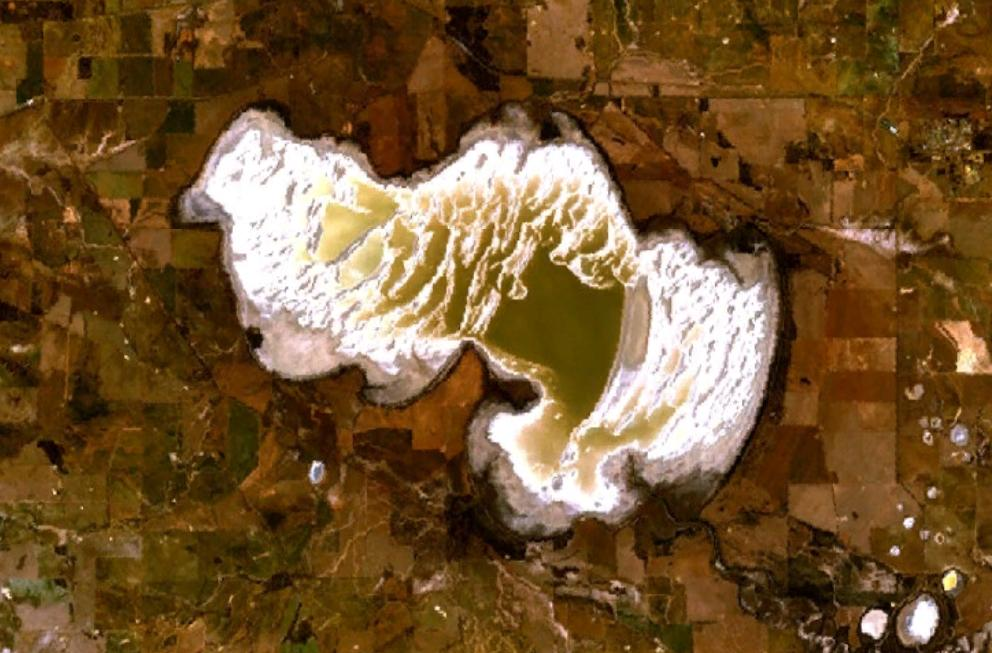
An example of salinity, areas surrounding Dumbleyung Lake have become unsuitable for grazing.

Natural Sequence Farming (NSF) is a method of landscape regeneration devised by the Australian farmer, Peter Andrews, in the 1970s.

The method involves implementing major earthworks on a given area of land that has been devastated by deforestation and general agricultural activities, to emulate the role of natural watercourses in an effort to reverse salinity, slow erosion and increase soil and water quality to enable native vegetation to regenerate and restore the riparian zone.

The method does not require the use of artificial fertilisers or herbicides.

== Flood control ==
Flood events may occur only once every 1 or 2 years; however, they have the ability to enhance or destroy a property. If the waters move too fast over bare land, then they can strip away topsoil and nutrients, leaving behind barren sands. By inserting barriers across creeks and encouraging water to spread outwards, the energy of a flood is reduced, the currents tend to deposit soil from upstream, and the water can soak into the land. This encourages grasses and fast-growing plants to take root.

== The role of weeds ==
Ground cover protects the land from drying and baking, and also stabilises the land in future flood events. While rye and other grasses have long been seen as beneficial crops for grazing, other plants that have been considered weeds can improve the soil, augment the growth of other crops, and assist the diet of grazing animals. These 'weeds' should not be removed. When they die naturally, they should be cut for feed or used as green manure.

Many 'weeds' thrive in only the regenerative cycle. Once the land recovers fertility, the weeds tend to be replaced naturally by trees.

== See also ==
- Salinity in Australia
- Environment of Australia
- Conservation in Australia
- Irrigation in Australia
- Climate change in Australia
- Seawater Greenhouse
