= General Washington Inn =

- U.S. National Register of Historic Places
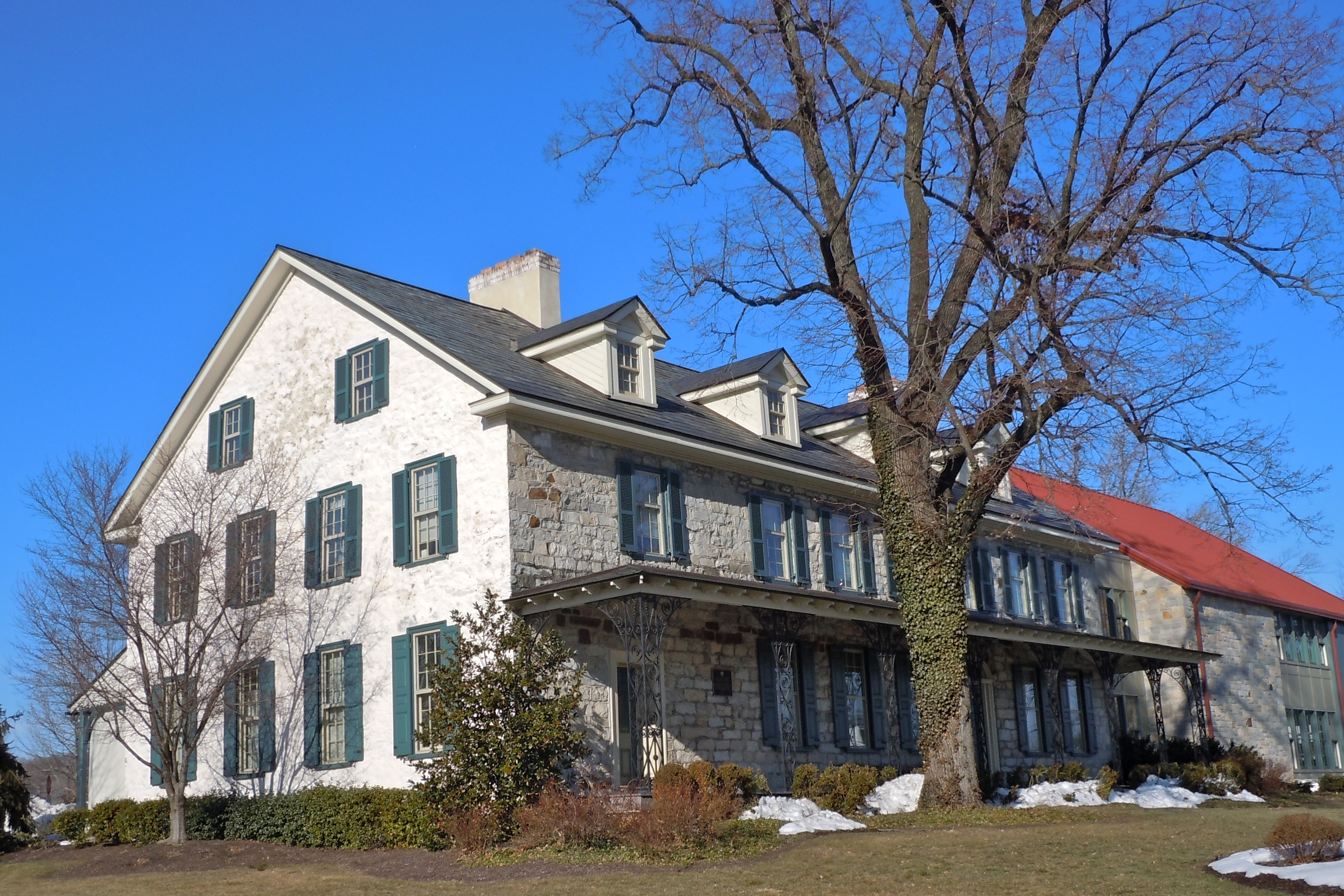
- General Washington Inn, February 2011

- Location within Pennsylvania Location within the United States
- Location: Uwchlan and E. Lancaster Aves., Downingtown, Pennsylvania
- Coordinates: 40°0′41″N 75°41′45″W
- Area: 1.8 acres (0.73 ha)
- Built: 1761
- Architectural style: Georgian, Federal
- NRHP reference No.: 79002197
- Added to NRHP: August 22, 1979

General Washington Inn is a historic inn and tavern located at Downingtown, Chester County, Pennsylvania. It was built in 1761, and is a 2 1/2-story, fieldstone and limestone structure measuring 62 feet, 6 inches, by 35 feet. The front facade features a one-story, full width verandah. Its design details reflect a mix of Georgian and Federal styles. It was the site of the first post office in Chester County, established in 1796.

It was added to the National Register of Historic Places in 1979.
