= Downingtown Log House =

Historic house in Pennsylvania, United States

- U.S. National Register of Historic Places
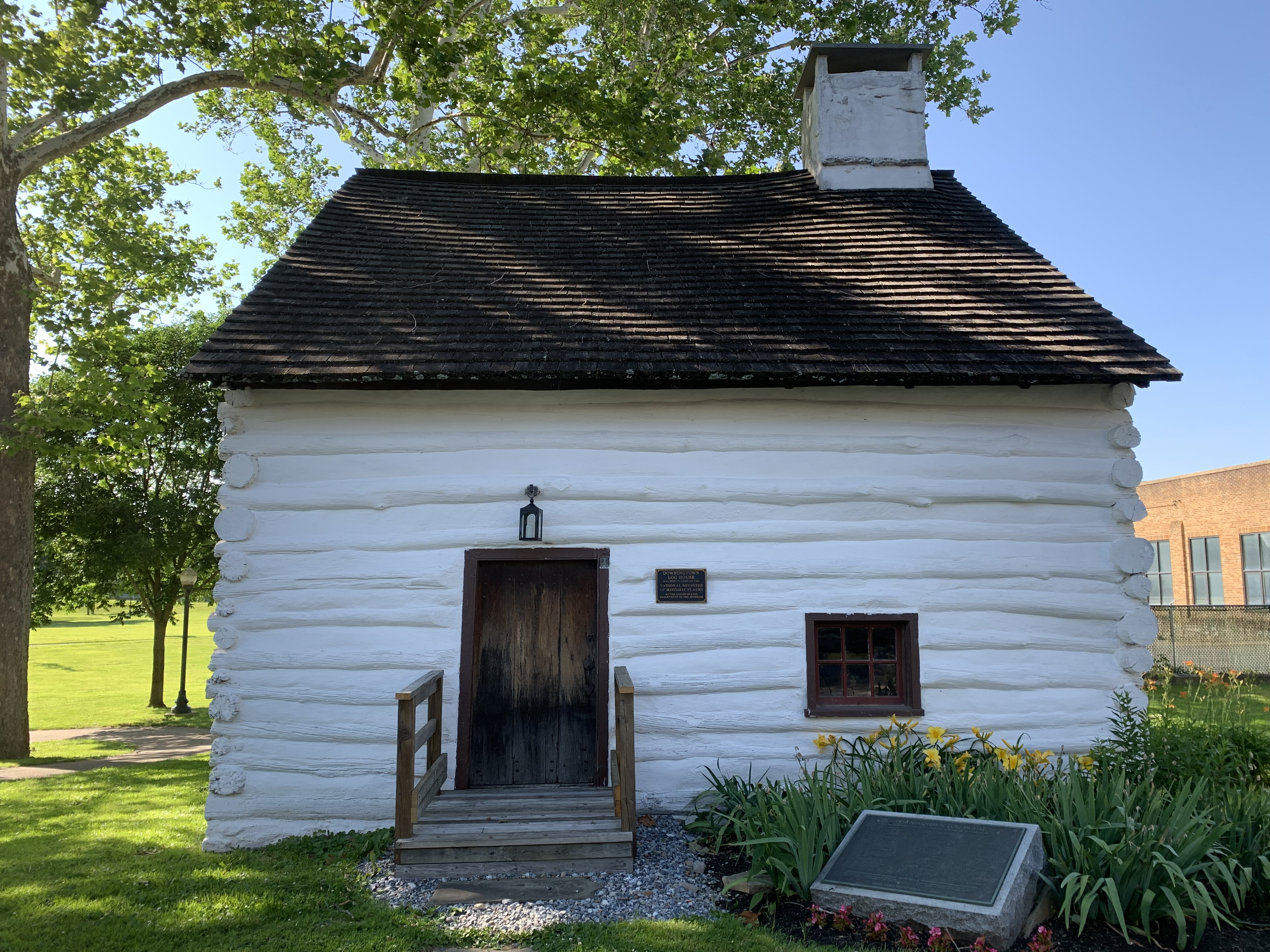
- Downingtown Log House in 2022

- Location within Pennsylvania Location within the United States
- Interactive map of Downingtown Log House
- Location: 15 E. Lancaster Ave., Downingtown, Pennsylvania
- Coordinates: 40°00′23″N 75°42′18″W
- Area: 1.2 acres (0.49 ha)
- Built: c. 1700
- Architectural style: Log house
- NRHP reference No.: 79002195
- Added to NRHP: May 24, 1979

Downingtown Log House is an American historic house located in Downingtown, Chester County, Pennsylvania. It was built circa 1700 and is a 1 1/2-story, round log structure measuring 21 feet 9 inches by 25 feet. The building is a house rather than a cabin because log cabins are only one floor. It was added to the National Register of Historic Places in 1979.

== Description and history ==
The Log House was constructed circa 1700 by early English settlers Jeremiah Collett or Joseph Hickman (the exact date and builder are unknown). It is the earliest surviving example of European settlement in central Chester County. Thomas Moore purchased the property in 1713 and constructed one of the county's first grist mill across the street in 1716. During the 18th century, the house served variously as a house, tavern, and trading post before becoming a rental property in the 19th and early 20th centuries. It is located on the Philadelphia and Lancaster Turnpike near Brandywine Creek.

Owned by members of the Downing family for about 200 years, the house has been owned by the Borough of Downingtown since 1940, when Thomas W. Downing willed the property to the borough. The house was restored in 1947 and became the headquarters for the Downingtown Chamber of Commerce from 1950 to 1988. In 1989, the house was restored a second time and relocated 70 feet away from its original location, adjacent to a busy roadway. The house is open to the public.

The house was constructed using 62 chestnut, oak, and white pine logs, all still extant. The roof is cedar-shingled and the exterior whitewashed. The log corners are saddle notched, characteristic of English Quaker log construction, though there are Swedish derivatives such as a slide-boarded window on the south wall and horizontal planking on the gable ends.

== See also ==
- Log building
- National Register of Historic Places listings in northern Chester County, Pennsylvania
