= Frederick Bicking =

Frederick Bicking (John Frederick Bicking) was an American paper mill owner who was born in Winterburg in the County of Sponheim in western Germany. Researchers believe that he may have emigrated from Germany to Philadelphia, and then may have moved from there to East Brandywine Township sometime prior to the American Revolution. He arrived in Philadelphia in 1741 with his parents Johann Reichard and Anna Elizabeth (Roos) Bicking (Böcking/Böecking), a brother and two of his three sisters.

Following his arrival in Pennsylvania, Bicking owned and operated a paper mill, establishing the Bicking paper dynasty that would last well into the 19th century. He also owned a fishery on the Schuylkill River, and operated the Sheetz, or "Dove Mill", which was thought to be the oldest or second-oldest paper mill (to the Rittenhouse mill) in the colonies. As someone who utilized indentured servants, his advertisements for assistance in recapturing "runaways" can be found in newspapers of the time period.

The Continental Congress allocated funds to purchase Bicking's paper for currency production. The bank notes to pay the troops at Valley Forge were printed on his paper. He is mentioned in several of the minutes of the Continental Congress and in the George Washington Papers where Capt.

James Lovell explains to General Washington that he thought the minutes of the Continental Congress were buried at Bicking's property to avoid destruction of the documents by the British. He also submitted a petition that papermakers should be exempt from military service. Bicking was named as a Patriot of the Revolution. Many of the second and third generation members of the family are buried in the Bicking family cemetery which has remained preserved for nearly two centuries and is now located on private property in Narberth, Pennsylvania.

Frederick Bicking married Mary Catherine Unverzagt of Otwiller, Germany on May 26, 1752 at St. Michael's & Zion Lutheran Church in Germantown, Pennsylvania. Mary Catherine Unverzagt, daughter of Johannes Unverzagt, was also a German Palatine.

Of Frederick Bicking's five sons, three were paper makers in Pennsylvania.

Frederick's son, John Bicking, had a paper mill near present-day Fisherville and was a soldier in the Philadelphia militia.
