= Brad Lancaster =

American water management expert, author and permaculture teacher

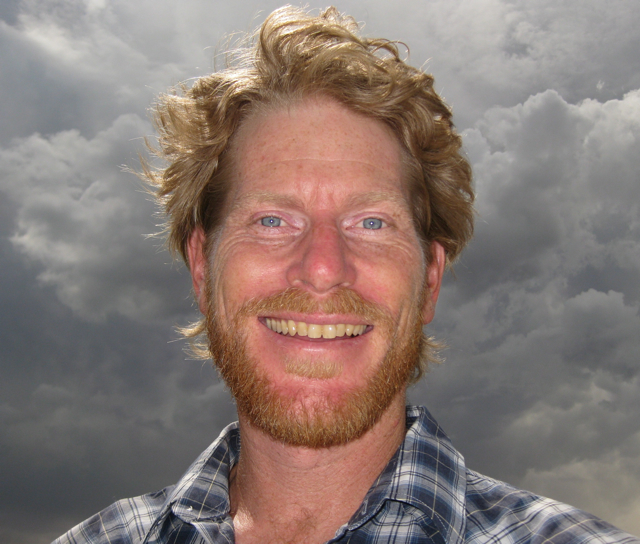
Brad Lancaster in 2009

Brad Stewart Lancaster (born 1967) is an expert in the field of rainwater harvesting and water management, sun & shade harvesting (passive solar design) and community-stewarded native food forestry. He is also a permaculture teacher, designer, consultant, live storyteller and co-founder of the Dunbar/Spring Neighborhood Foresters, and Desert Harvesters, both non-profit organizations.

Lancaster lives on an eighth of an acre (506 m2) in downtown Tucson, Arizona, where rainfall is less than 12 inches (300 mm) per annum. In such arid conditions, Lancaster consistently models that annually catching 100,000 US gallons (380,000 L; 83,000 imp gal) of rainwater to feed food-bearing shade trees, abundant gardens, and a thriving landscape is a much more viable option than the municipal system of directing it into storm drains and sewer systems.

Lancaster helped legalize the harvest of street runoff in the city of Tucson, Arizona, with then-illegal water-harvesting curb cuts at his and his brother’s home and demonstration site that made openings in the street curb to enable street runoff to freely irrigate street-side and in-street water-harvesting/traffic-calming landscapes of food-bearing native vegetation. After proving the concept, Brad then worked with the City of Tucson to legalize, enhance, and incentivize the process.

Lancaster co-created and now co-organizes the Neighborhood Foresters program which since 1996 has coordinated volunteer crews of neighbors to plant and steward over 1,700 native food-bearing trees and thousands of native food-bearing and medicinal understory plantings within or beside water-harvesting earthworks that, combined, harvest over one million gallons (3.7 million liters) of stormwater per year in his neighborhood, while helping and training volunteers from other neighborhoods to lead similar efforts in their neighborhoods.

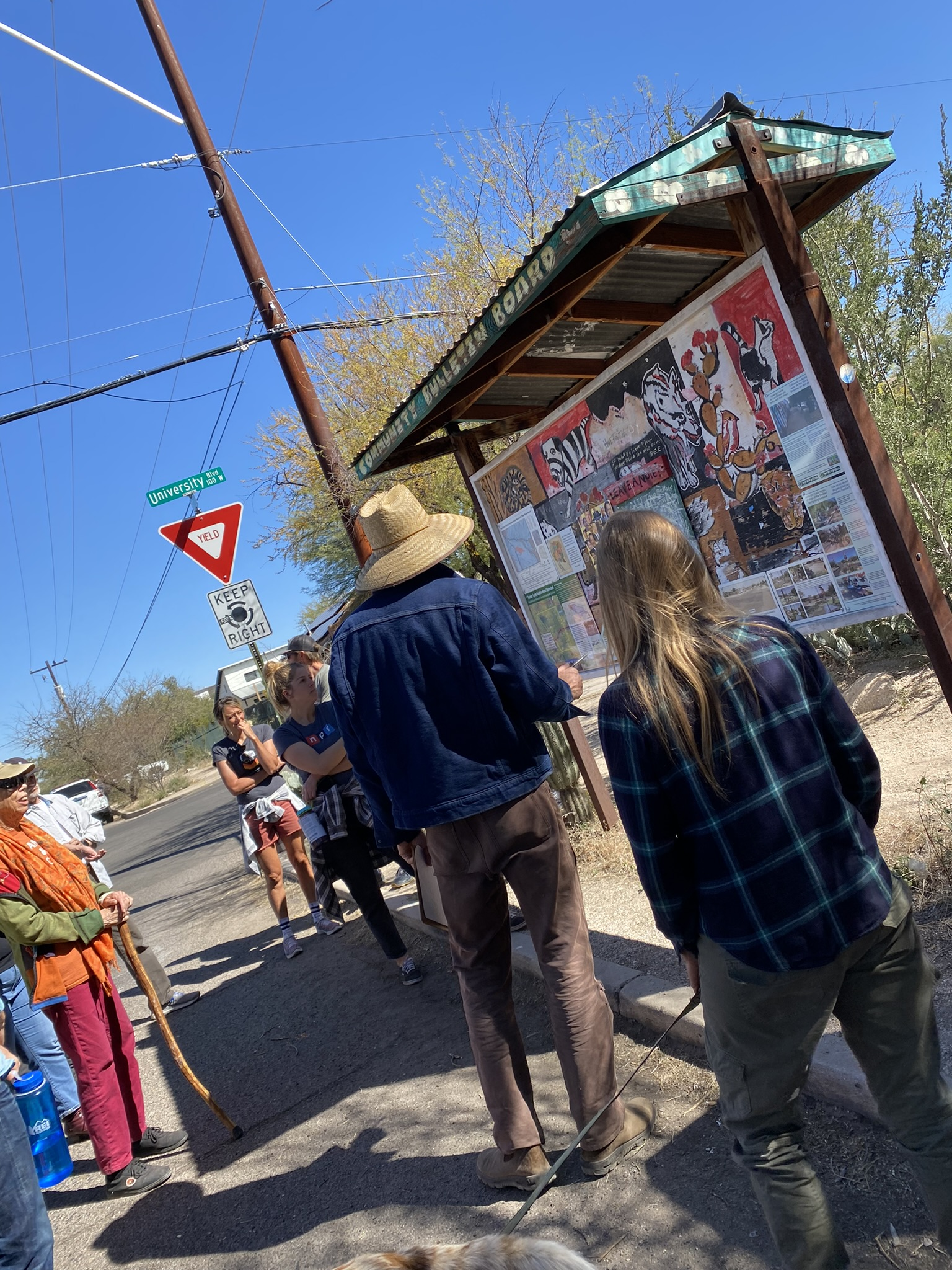
Brad Lancaster leading tour of rainwater harvesting and walkability improvements in Dunbar Spring neighborhood, Tucson, Arizona - 2022

The Desert Harvesters non-profit organization Brad co-founded teaches the public how to identify, harvest, and process many of the native-plant foods neighbors are planting in their neighborhoods. Desert Harvesters also makes the utilization of native foods easier by organizing community milling events that mill native mesquite pods into nutritious and delicious mesquite flour which is utilized by a growing number of restaurants, breweries, and home kitchens. Brad resigned from Desert Harvesters in the summer of 2020.

He was involved in a 2009 project, acting as a representative for the U.S. State Department on an educational tour in the Middle East.

== Lectures ==
Lancaster lectures at the ECOSA Institute; the University of Arizona; and Prescott College. He has been a guest speaker at the annual Bioneers Convergence; Green Festival USGBC’s Greenbuild Conference; Texas Natural Building Colloquium; the New Mexico Xeriscape Conference; the Green Festival; the 2009 Water Conservation & Xeriscaping EXPO; the New Mexico Organic Farming Conference; Conference of World Affairs and various Audubon Expeditions.

== Design ==
Lancaster has designed integrated water-harvesting and permaculture systems for multiple projects, including the Tucson Audubon Simpson Farm restoration site, the Milagro development, Stone Curves co-housing project, and the Tucson Nature Conservancy water-harvesting demonstration site, the Wallace Desert Garden at the Boyce Thompson Arboretum, and the Tumamoc Resilience Garden.

== Books ==
- Lancaster, Brad (2020). Rainwater Harvesting for Drylands and Beyond, Volume 2: Water-Harvesting Earthworks, 2nd Edition. Rainsource Press.
- Lancaster, Brad (2019). Rainwater Harvesting for Drylands and Beyond, Volume 1: Guiding Principles to Welcome Rain into Your Life and Landscape, 3rd Edition. Rainsource Press.
- Desert Harvesters (2018). Eat Mesquite and More: A Cookbook for Sonoran Desert Foods and Living. Rainsource Press. [Brad Lancaster: contributing author and editor.]
- Mottram, A., Carlberg, E., Love A., Cole, T., Brush W., Lancaster, B. (2017). Resilience Design in Smallholder Farming Systems: A Practical Approach to Strengthening Farmer Resilience to Shocks and Stresses. The TOPS Program and Mercy Corps.
- Lancaster, Brad (2013). Rainwater Harvesting for Drylands and Beyond, Volume 1: Guiding Principles to Welcome Rain into Your Life and Landscape, 2nd Edition. Rainsource Press.
- Lancaster, Brad (2008). Rainwater Harvesting for Drylands and Beyond, Volume 2: Water-Harvesting Earthworks, 1st Edition. Rainsource Press.
- Lancaster, Brad (2006). Rainwater Harvesting for Drylands and Beyond, Volume 1: Guiding Principles to Welcome Rain into Your Life and Landscape, 1st Edition. Rainsource Press.

== Published articles ==
- Journal of American Water Works Association
- The Ecologist
- Chelsea Green

== Awards ==
- Citizen Forester of the Year: Arizona Department of Forestry and Fire Management (2021)
- MOCA Local Genius Award: Tucson (2016)
- Lifetime Achievement Award: American Rainwater Catchment Systems Association (ARCSA) (2015)
- Bicycle Commuter of the Year: Tucson-Pima County Bicycle Advisory Committee (2014)
- Cox Conserves Hero: Arizona (2013)
- David Yetman Award: Tucson Audubon Society (2013)
- Award of Excellence/Personal Recognition from American Rainwater Catchment Systems Association (2008)
- Arizona Department of Water Resources/Tohono Chul Park Xeriscape Contest Award, First Place – Homeowner under $10,000 (2005)
- Arizona Department of Water Resources/Tohono Chul Park Xeriscape Contest Award – Best Water Harvesting (2005)
- Arizona Department of Water Resources/Tohono Chul Park Xeriscape Contest Award –J.D. Di Melglio Artistry in Landscaping (2005)
- City of Tucson and Pima County Good Neighbor Award (2001)
- Tucson Weekly voted Dunbar/Spring Organic Community Garden the Best Neighborhood Garden (2000)
