= Toby Hemenway =

American ecological writer (1952–2016)

- Born: April 23, 1952
- Died: December 20, 2016 (aged 64)
- Education: Tufts University
- Occupations: Writer, educator, environmentalist
- Spouse: Kiel Hemenway
- Writing career
- Language: English
- Genre: Non-fiction
- Subjects: Permaculture, peak oil, sustainability
- Notable work: Gaia's Garden: A Guide to Home-Scale Permaculture
- Website: tobyhemenway.com

Toby Hemenway (April 23, 1952 – December 20, 2016) was an American author and educator who wrote extensively on permaculture and ecological issues. He was the author of Gaia's Garden: A Guide to Home-Scale Permaculture and The Permaculture City: Regenerative Design for Urban, Suburban, and Town Resilience. He served as an adjunct professor at Portland State University, Scholar-in-Residence at Pacific University, and field director at the Permaculture Institute (USA).

== Career ==
After obtaining a degree in biology from Tufts University, Hemenway worked for many years as a researcher in genetics and immunology, first in academic laboratories including Harvard and the University of Washington in Seattle. He also worked at Immunex, a major medical biotech company.

At about the time he was growing dissatisfied with the direction biotechnology was taking, he discovered permaculture. A career change followed, and Hemenway and his wife, Kiel, spent ten years creating a rural permaculture site in southern Oregon. He was the editor of Permaculture Activist, a journal of ecological design and sustainable culture, from 1999 to 2004. He moved to Portland, Oregon in 2004, and after six years of developing urban sustainability resources there, Hemenway and his wife divided their time between Sebastopol, California and western Montana.

Hemenway died of pancreatic cancer on December 20, 2016.

The Permaculture Skills Center in California opened a Toby Hemenway Memorial Library using the author’s personal collection.

== Selected works ==
=== Books ===
- Gaia's Garden: A Guide to Home-Scale Permaculture (2001, ISBN 978-1890132521)
- The Permaculture City: Regenerative Design for Urban, Suburban, and Town Resilience (2015, ISBN 978-1603585262)

=== Other ===
- Foreword to Jono Neiger's The Permaculture Promise (2006)
- Foreword to Heather C. Flores’ Food Not Lawns (2006)

== Lectures ==
- How Permaculture can Save Humanity and the Planet - but not Civilization
- Redesigning Civilization with Permaculture
