= J. Russell Smith =

American geographer (1874–1966)

Joseph Russell Smith
- Formal portrait with beard
- Born: February 3, 1874; Piedmont region of Virginia
- Died: February 26, 1966 (aged 92)
- Education: Bachelor of Science; Doctor of Philosophy
- Alma mater: Wharton School
- Known for: Early pioneer in agroforestry
- Spouse(s): Henrietta Stewart (1898-1962); Bessie Wilmarth Gahn (1964-1966)
- Awards: Harmon Award; Cullum Geographical Medal
- Scientific career
- Fields: Economic geography, Agroforestry
- Thesis: The Organization of Ocean Commerce (1903)
- Doctoral advisor: Emory Richard Johnson

Joseph Russell Smith (February 3, 1874 – February 26, 1966) was an American geographer. He worked in the Department of Geography and Industry at the University of Pennsylvania and later the Columbia Business School where he chaired the economic geography program. From 1941 to 1942, he was president of the American Association of Geographers.

He is considered the father of the field of agroforestry.

== History ==
=== Childhood and education ===
Smith was born in the Piedmont region of Virginia and raised in a Quaker household that focused on farming. He attended the Wharton School for his bachelor's degree, but had an extended degree period lasting for five years from 1893 to 1898 due to him having to teach on the side in order to pay for his university attendance. His graduate degree studies afterward were conducted under Emory Richard Johnson and he was assigned in 1899 to work with the Isthmian Canal Commission in order to research how the canal would impact commercial enterprises across the new Central American shipping route. He spent later parts of his education looking into the importance of geographical research, which was not offered as a main course of study at the time in schools. A year abroad in Germany and time spent researching the country's port cities alongside Friedrich Ratzel and Karl Sapper allowed him to further understand that more than physical geography was required for general student understanding of such topics. Not long after, he completed his Ph.D. defense in 1903 with his thesis titled "The Organization of Ocean Commerce".

=== Career ===
After graduating, Smith was given an instructor position at the Wharton School and this resulted in him having to develop his own textbooks for the courses he taught, leading to many of his literary releases on a variety of industries. His official and main college text was titled Industrial and Commercial Geography, which was the first US collegiate text on the subject of economic geography, and it was through the success of this text that he was able to formally organize the Geography and Industry Department at the university. By 1919, the failure of the Wharton School to properly pay the salaries of his ten assistant students led to Smith resigning from his position and taking up a new job as the head of the economic geography department that was formed at the new Columbia School of Business. During that same year, Smith removed himself from direct academic research so he could work on his upcoming book, Influence of the Great War Upon Shipping, as requested and funded by the Carnegie Endowment for International Peace. He also took a trip to Russia alongside Herbert Hoover in order to assist the American Relief Administration in their efforts to manage and combat the Russian famine of 1921–22. Afterward, he continued traveling around the world throughout the 1920s in order to continue gathering materials for future books. He retired from his head departmental position at Columbia University in April 1940.

In 1929, he released his book Tree Crops: A Permanent Agriculture, which would serve as one of the earliest sources and motivators for the field of agroforestry, though it would not be made into a true scientific field until the 1960s. The impetus for the book came about from his global travels whereby he saw the negative impacts of soil erosion in multiple countries. So he focused his book on the idea of tree breeding and the development of genetically superior cultivars that could be grown in poor, often mountainous, soils so as to improve them. He also suggested the creation of many national branches of an "Institute of Mountain Agriculture" in order to maintain upkeep of these endeavors. Smith discussed his research on general agricultural improvement at the seventeenth international congress of the International Geographical Union in 1952 and presented hypothetical ideas on future technologies, including methods for removing the salt from ocean water and using solar power to help in the irrigation of deserts and arid lands by pumping river water from mountainous regions.

== Accolades and awards ==
Thanks to his article "Plan or Perish" published in the July 1927 edition of the Survey Graphic that discussed a plan to control high water levels in the Mississippi Valley after a flood, Smith won the Harmon award of $500 and a gold medal from the Harmon Foundation in December of that year. In 1956, Smith was awarded the Cullum Geographical Medal from the American Geographical Society. He also received honorary doctorates from Columbia University (in 1929) and the University of Pennsylvania (in 1957).

== Personal life ==
As a child Smith was exposed to the religious traditions of the liberal Quaker movement, and he kept those beliefs for the rest of his life, leading to him being heavily interactive with the Quaker community around Swarthmore, Pennsylvania. In 1930, Smith joined in a project alongside Jesse H. Holmes and other professors in order to "modernize" the Quaker movement to be in line with scientific knowledge and make their collective beliefs a "Creedless" movement that combined their understandings of God and science.

He married his wife, Henrietta Stewart, in 1898 and she traveled with him to Germany and across Europe during his studies and later academic pursuits. During his later years from the 1930s onward, his involvement in research and university leadership diminished due to him taking time to care for his wife and her worsening disabilities until her death in 1962. Together, they had three children. He remarried in 1964 to Bessie Wilmarth Gahn. Smith died at the age of 92 on February 26, 1966.

=== Orchard ===
Smith had a nursery and orchard outside Round Hill, Virginia where he propagated trees he deemed useful. The final decades of his life involved him attempting to defeat chestnut blight and he developed 20 varietals of the Chinese chestnut alongside the USDA in order to create a blight resistant chestnut tree.

Smith collected several types of persimmon near the Great Wall of China in 1925. Some of the trees may still survive in his orchard.

== Books ==
- The Ocean Carrier (1908)
- Industrial and Commercial Geography (1913)
- The World's Food Resources (1919)
- Influence of the Great War Upon Shipping (1919)
- North America (1925), Revised Edition (1940)
- Tree Crops: A Permanent Agriculture (1929)
