= List of Impatiens species =

Impatiens is a large, broadly distributed genus of flowering plants in the family Balsaminaceae. As of November 2025, Plants of the World Online (POWO) recognises 1,167 species and 4 hybrids, as follows:

== A ==
- Impatiens aadishankarii Bhaskar & Sringesw.
- Impatiens abbatis Hook.f.
- Impatiens academiae-moguntiae Eb.Fisch. & Raheliv.
- Impatiens acaulis Arn.
- Impatiens acehensis Grey-Wilson
- Impatiens achudanandanii V.S.A.Kumar, M.G.Govind & Sindhu Arya
- Impatiens aconitoides Y.M.Shui & W.H.Chen
- Impatiens acuminata Benth. ex Hook.f. & Thomson
- Impatiens adamowskiana Gogoi & Borah
- Impatiens adenioides Suksathan & Keerat.
- Impatiens agastyamalayensis (Bhaskar) A.Joe, Bhaskar & M.Sabu
- Impatiens agumbeana Bhaskar & Razi
- Impatiens ahernii Hook.f.
- Impatiens akomensis S.B.Janssens, Sonké & O.Lachenaud
- Impatiens alboarenicola Y.Fujimoto, Rabarison & Tagane
- Impatiens albocolumba Suksathan & Ruchis.
- Impatiens alboflava Miq.
- Impatiens albopetala Gogoi & Borah
- Impatiens albopurpurea Eb.Fisch. & Raheliv.
- Impatiens albopustulosa H.Perrier
- Impatiens alborosea Tardieu
- Impatiens alborubra Hook.f. ex Baker f.
- Impatiens aliciae C.E.C.Fisch.
- Impatiens allanii Hook.f.
- Impatiens alpicola Y.L.Chen & Y.Q.Lu
- Impatiens alveolata H.Perrier
- Impatiens amabilis Hook.f.
- Impatiens ambahatrensis Eb.Fisch. & Raheliv.
- Impatiens ambanizanensis Eb.Fisch. & Raheliv.
- Impatiens amoena H.Perrier
- Impatiens amphibia H.Perrier
- Impatiens amphorata Edgew.
- Impatiens amplexicaulis Edgew.
- Impatiens ampokafoensis Eb.Fisch. & Raheliv.
- Impatiens anaimudica C.E.C.Fisch.
- Impatiens analavelensis H.Perrier
- Impatiens andapensis Eb.Fisch. & Raheliv.
- Impatiens andersonii Hook.f.
- Impatiens andohahelae Eb.Fisch. & Raheliv.
- Impatiens andringitrensis H.Perrier
- Impatiens angulata S.X.Yu, Y.L.Chen & H.N.Qin
- Impatiens angustiflora Hook.f.
- Impatiens anhuiensis Y.L.Chen
- Impatiens anjawensis Borah, Kandwal, Chhetri & Gogoi
- Impatiens ankaizinensis H.Perrier
- Impatiens ankaranensis Eb.Fisch. & Raheliv.
- Impatiens annamensis Tardieu
- Impatiens anovensis H.Perrier
- Impatiens antongiliana H.Perrier
- Impatiens apalophylla Hook.f.
- Impatiens apiculata De Wild.
- Impatiens appendiculata Arn.
- Impatiens apsotis Hook.f.
- Impatiens aquatica Bhaskar
- Impatiens aquatilis Hook.f.
- Impatiens arachnoides H.Perrier
- Impatiens arctosepala Hook.f.
- Impatiens arguta Hook.f. & Thomson
- Impatiens armeniaca S.H.Huang
- Impatiens arnottii Thwaites
- Impatiens arriensii (Zoll.) T.Shimizu
- Impatiens arunachalensis Hareesh, A.Joe, M.Sabu & Gogoi
- Impatiens ashihoi Gogoi & Borah
- Impatiens asperipes H.Perrier
- Impatiens asperipetala H.Perrier
- Impatiens assamensis Griff.
- Impatiens assurgens Baker
- Impatiens atrolineata H.Perrier
- Impatiens atrorubra H.Perrier
- Impatiens attopeuensis Hook.f.
- Impatiens aureiflora Suksathan & La-ongsri
- Impatiens aurella Rydb.
- Impatiens auricoma Baill.
- Impatiens auriculata Wight
- Impatiens austrotanzanica Grey-Wilson
- Impatiens austroyunnanensis S.H.Huang

== B ==
- Impatiens bababudenensis Hook.f.
- Impatiens bachii H.Lév.
- Impatiens bahanensis Hand.-Mazz.
- Impatiens bajurensis Shinobu Akiyama & H.Ohba
- Impatiens bakeri Warb.
- Impatiens bakthangensis Chhetri, Sherpa & Gogoi
- Impatiens balansae Hook.f.
- Impatiens balfourii Hook.f.
- Impatiens balsamina L.
- Impatiens banen Cheek
- Impatiens bannaensis S.H.Huang
- Impatiens baokangensis Q.L.Gan & X.W.Li
- Impatiens barbata H.F.Comber
- Impatiens barberi Hook.f.
- Impatiens barbulata G.M.Schulze
- Impatiens bardotiae Eb.Fisch. & Raheliv.
- Impatiens barnesii Hook.f.
- Impatiens baroniana H.Perrier
- Impatiens baronii Baker
- Impatiens barthlottii Eb.Fisch. & Raheliv.
- Impatiens batanggadisensis Utami
- Impatiens bathiei Eb.Fisch. & Raheliv.
- Impatiens beccarii Hook.f. ex Dunn
- Impatiens befiananensis Eb.Fisch. & Raheliv.
- Impatiens begoniifolia S.Akiyama & H.Ohba
- Impatiens begonioides Eb.Fisch. & Raheliv.
- Impatiens beipanjiangensis Jian Xu & H.F.Hu
- Impatiens bellula Hook.f.
- Impatiens bemarahensis Eb.Fisch. & Raheliv.
- Impatiens benitae Eb.Fisch., Wohlh. & Raheliv.
- Impatiens benthamii Steenis
- Impatiens bequaertii De Wild.
- Impatiens betsomangae Eb.Fisch. & Raheliv.
- Impatiens bhaskarii J.R.N.Dessai, L.Joseph & Janarth.
- Impatiens bhimgadensis Bhaskar & Sringesw.
- Impatiens bicaudata H.Perrier
- Impatiens bicolor Royle
- Impatiens bicornis L.Joseph & Bhaskar
- Impatiens bicornuta Wall.
- Impatiens bidentata H.Perrier
- Impatiens bijieensis X.X.Bai & L.Y.Ren
- Impatiens biluoxueshanensis S.Akiyama & S.K.Wu
- Impatiens biophytoides H.Perrier
- Impatiens bisaccata Warb.
- Impatiens blepharosepala E.Pritz.
- Impatiens blinii H.Lév.
- Impatiens bodenii Ridl.
- Impatiens bodinieri Hook.f.
- Impatiens boinensis H.Perrier
- Impatiens bokorensis S.H.Cho & B.Y.Kim
- Impatiens bolovenensis Tardieu
- Impatiens bomiensis Y.Y.Cong & Y.C.Peng
- Impatiens bonii Hook.f.
- Impatiens brachycentra Kar. & Kir.
- Impatiens bracteata Colebr. ex Wall.
- Impatiens bracteolata Hook.f.
- Impatiens brahmagiriana Sarav. & Kaliam.
- Impatiens brevipes Hook.f.
- Impatiens briartii De Wild. & T.Durand
- Impatiens brittoi B.Mani & S.Thomas
- Impatiens buccinalis Hook.f.
- Impatiens buennemeijeri Grey-Wilson
- Impatiens bullata H.Perrier
- Impatiens bullatisepala G.W.Hu, Y.Y.Cong & Q.F.Wang
- Impatiens bungeilang Mustaqim
- Impatiens bungeusing Mustaqim & Ruchis.
- Impatiens burtonii Hook.f.
- Impatiens bururiensis Grey-Wilson
- Impatiens butu Gavin-Smyth

== C ==
- Impatiens calcicola Craib
- Impatiens calendulina Grey-Wilson
- Impatiens callmanderi Eb.Fisch., Wohlh. & Raheliv.
- Impatiens campanulata Wight
- Impatiens capensis Meerb.
- Impatiens capillipes Hook.f. & Thomson
- Impatiens cardiophylla Hook.f.
- Impatiens carlsoniae Eb.Fisch. & Raheliv.
- Impatiens casseabriae Y.H.Tan, S.S.Zhou & B.Yang
- Impatiens catati Baill.
- Impatiens cathcartii Hook.f.
- Impatiens cavaleriei X.X.Bai & R.X.Huang
- Impatiens cecilii N.E.Br.
- Impatiens celatiflora H.Perrier
- Impatiens celligera H.Perrier
- Impatiens centralis Suksathan & Triboun
- Impatiens ceratophora H.F.Comber
- Impatiens chamchumroonii Suksathan & Ruchis.
- Impatiens chanburiensis Suksathan & Wongnak
- Impatiens chandrasekharanii Chandrab.
- Impatiens chapaensis Tardieu
- Impatiens charanii T.Shimizu
- Impatiens charisma Suksathan & Keerat.
- Impatiens chashanensis H.Y.Bi & S.X.Yu
- Impatiens chekiangensis Y.L.Chen
- Impatiens chenmoui Zheng W.Wang, Xiao C.Li & Q.Wang ter
- Impatiens cheruthoniensis V.S.A.Kumar & Sindhu Arya
- Impatiens chevalieri Tardieu
- Impatiens chiangdaoensis Shimizu
- Impatiens chikuensis Kiew
- Impatiens chimiliensis H.F.Comber
- Impatiens chinensis L.
- Impatiens chishuiensis Y.X.Xiong
- Impatiens chiulungensis Y.L.Chen
- Impatiens chlorosepala Hand.-Mazz.
- Impatiens chloroxantha Y.L.Chen
- Impatiens choneceras Hassk.
- Impatiens chumphonensis T.Shimizu
- Impatiens chungtienensis Y.L.Chen
- Impatiens chunkaoi Suksathan & Panitvong
- Impatiens ciliifolia Grey-Wilson
- Impatiens cinnabarina Grey-Wilson
- Impatiens circaeoides Wall. ex Hook.f. & Thomson
- Impatiens cirrhipetala Hook.f.
- Impatiens citrina Hook.f.
- Impatiens clavata Bhaskar
- Impatiens clavicalcar Eb.Fisch.
- Impatiens clavicornu Turcz.
- Impatiens clavicuspis Hook.f. ex W.W.Sm.
- Impatiens clavigera Hook.f.
- Impatiens coelotropis C.E.C.Fisch.
- Impatiens columbaria Bos
- Impatiens commelinoides Hand.-Mazz.
- Impatiens comorensis Baker
- Impatiens compta Hook.f.
- Impatiens conaensis Y.L.Chen
- Impatiens conchibracteata Y.L.Chen & Y.Q.Lu
- Impatiens concinna Hook.f.
- Impatiens confusa Grey-Wilson
- Impatiens congolensis G.M.Schulze & R.Wilczek
- Impatiens corchorifolia Franch.
- Impatiens cordata Wight
- Impatiens cornigera Arn.
- Impatiens cornucopia Franch.
- Impatiens cornutisepala S.X.Yu, Y.L.Chen & H.N.Qin
- Impatiens cothurnoides C.E.C.Fisch.
- Impatiens coursiana H.Perrier
- Impatiens courtallensis Ramas. & Pandur.
- Impatiens crassicaudex Hook.f.
- Impatiens crassisepala Tardieu
- Impatiens crenata Bedd.
- Impatiens crenulata Hook.f.
- Impatiens cribbii (Grey-Wilson) Grey-Wilson
- Impatiens cryptoneura Hook.f.
- Impatiens curtisii Hook.f.
- Impatiens curvipes Hook.f.
- Impatiens cuspidata Wight & Arn.
- Impatiens cyanantha Hook.f.
- Impatiens cyathiflora Hook.f.
- Impatiens cyclosepala Hook.f. ex W.W.Sm.
- Impatiens cymbifera Hook.f.

== D-E ==
- Impatiens daguanensis S.H.Huang
- Impatiens dairiensis Utami
- Impatiens dalaiensis Gogoi & Borah
- Impatiens dalzellii Hook.f. & Thomson
- Impatiens damingensis S.X.Yu, Chang Y.Xia & H.P.Deng
- Impatiens damrongii Shimizu
- Impatiens danguyana H.Perrier
- Impatiens danii Sindhu Arya, V.Suresh & V.S.A.Kumar
- Impatiens darachuensis P.Gyeltshen, W.Adamowski & Phuntsho
- Impatiens daraneeae Suksathan & Triboun
- Impatiens dasysperma Wight
- Impatiens dasyvexilla Q.L.Gan & X.W.Li
- Impatiens davidi Franch.
- Impatiens debilis Turcz.
- Impatiens decaryana H.Perrier
- Impatiens decipiens Hook.f.
- Impatiens decurva Ruchis. & S.B.Janssens
- Impatiens delabathiana Eb.Fisch. & Raheliv.
- Impatiens delavayi Franch.
- Impatiens delectans Ridl.
- Impatiens delicata Toppin
- Impatiens delicatula Baill.
- Impatiens dempoana Hook.f.
- Impatiens dendricola C.E.C.Fisch.
- Impatiens denisonii Bedd.
- Impatiens densifolia (G.M.Schulze & R.Wilczek) Grey-Wilson
- Impatiens depauperata Hook.f.
- Impatiens deqinensis S.H.Huang
- Impatiens desmantha Hook.f.
- Impatiens devolii T.C.Huang
- Impatiens dewildeana Grey-Wilson
- Impatiens diaphana Hook.f.
- Impatiens dibangensis Gogoi & Borah
- Impatiens dicentra Franch. ex Hook.f.
- Impatiens dichroa Hook.f.
- Impatiens dichroocarpa H.Lév.
- Impatiens diepenhorstii Miq.
- Impatiens digitata Warb.
- Impatiens dimorphophylla Franch.
- Impatiens discolor DC.
- Impatiens disotis Hook.f.
- Impatiens distracta Hook.f.
- Impatiens divaricata Franch.
- Impatiens diversifolia Wall. ex Wight & Arn.
- Impatiens doitungensis Triboun & Sonsupab
- Impatiens doiwaoensis Suksathan & Wongnak
- Impatiens dolichoceras E.Pritz.
- Impatiens dorjeekhandui Chowlu, S.S.Dash & Gogoi
- Impatiens dorstenioides (Baker) Warb.
- Impatiens drepanophora Hook.f.
- Impatiens druartii Eb.Fisch. & Raheliv.
- Impatiens duclouxii Hook.f.
- Impatiens eberhardtii Tardieu
- Impatiens ecalcarata Collett & Hemsl.
- Impatiens echinosperma H.Perrier
- Impatiens ecornuta Gerry Moore, Zika & Rushworth
- Impatiens edgeworthii Hook.f.
- Impatiens ekapaksiana Utami
- Impatiens elachistocentra G.M.Schulze
- Impatiens elatostemmoides H.Perrier
- Impatiens elegans Bedd.
- Impatiens elephanticeps Grey-Wilson
- Impatiens elianae Abrah. & Eb.Fisch.
- Impatiens elisettae Eb.Fisch.
- Impatiens elongata Arn.
- Impatiens elwiraurzulae Eb.Fisch., Abrah., Holstein & S.B.Janssens
- Impatiens emiliae Eb.Fisch. & Raheliv.
- Impatiens engleri Gilg
- Impatiens epilobioides Y.L.Chen
- Impatiens erecticornis R.Wilczek & G.M.Schulze
- Impatiens eriospenna H.Perrier
- Impatiens ernstii Hook.f.
- Impatiens erubescens Dunn
- Impatiens eryaleia Launert
- Impatiens ethiopica Grey-Wilson
- Impatiens etindensis Cheek & Eb.Fisch.
- Impatiens etugei Cheek
- Impatiens evelinae Simonsson
- Impatiens evrardii Tardieu
- Impatiens exiguiflora Hook.f.
- Impatiens exilis Hook.f.
- Impatiens extensifolia Hook.f.

== F-G ==
- Impatiens faberi Hook.f.
- Impatiens falcifera Hook.f.
- Impatiens fanjingshanica Y.L.Chen
- Impatiens fargesii Hook.f.
- Impatiens fasciculata Lam.
- Impatiens fenghwaiana Y.L.Chen
- Impatiens fianarantsoae Eb.Fisch. & Raheliv.
- Impatiens filicaulis Hook.f.
- Impatiens filicornu Hook.f.
- Impatiens finetii Tardieu
- Impatiens firmula Baker
- Impatiens fischeri Warb.
- Impatiens fissicornis Maxim.
- Impatiens flaccida Arn.
- Impatiens flammea Gilg
- Impatiens flanaganiae Hemsl.
- Impatiens flava Charit.
- Impatiens flavescens Karupp. & V.Ravich.
- Impatiens flemingii Hook.f.
- Impatiens floretii N.Hallé & A.M.Louis
- Impatiens floribunda Wight
- Impatiens florigera C.B.Clarke ex Hook.f.
- Impatiens florulenta Hook.f.
- Impatiens fontinalis H.Perrier
- Impatiens forbesii Hook.f. ex Baker f.
- Impatiens formosa Hook.f.
- Impatiens forrestii Hook.f. ex W.W.Sm.
- Impatiens foxworthyi M.R.Hend.
- Impatiens fragicolor C.Marquand & Airy Shaw
- Impatiens frithii Cheek
- Impatiens fruticosa Lesch. ex DC.
- Impatiens fuchsioides H.Perrier
- Impatiens fugongensis K.M.Liu & Y.Y.Cong
- Impatiens fujianensis Liang Ma, Xin Y.Chen & S.P.Chen
- Impatiens fulgens H.Perrier
- Impatiens furcata H.Perrier
- Impatiens furcillata Hemsl.
- Impatiens furfuracea Grey-Wilson
- Impatiens gadellae Souvann. & Suksathan
- Impatiens gagnepainiana Tardieu
- Impatiens galactica Eb.Fisch., Raheliv. & Abrah.
- Impatiens gamblei Hook.f.
- Impatiens gammiei Hook.f.
- Impatiens gardneriana Wight
- Impatiens gasterocheila Hook.f.
- Impatiens gautieri Eb.Fisch. & Raheliv.
- Impatiens geniculata H.Perrier
- Impatiens geniorum Humbert
- Impatiens georgei-schatzii Eb.Fisch. & Raheliv.
- Impatiens gesneroidea Gilg
- Impatiens gibbisepala Hook.f.
- Impatiens glabrata K.M.P.Kumar, Hareesh & Bhaskar
- Impatiens glandulifera Royle
- Impatiens glandulisepala Grey-Wilson
- Impatiens glaricola Kiew
- Impatiens glauca Hook.f. & Thomson
- Impatiens gomphophylla Baker
- Impatiens gongchengensis Z.C.Lu, B.Pan & Yan Liu
- Impatiens gongolana N.Hallé
- Impatiens gongshanensis Y.L.Chen
- Impatiens gordonii Horne ex Baker
- Impatiens gossweileri G.M.Schulze
- Impatiens goughii Wight
- Impatiens graciliflora Hook.f.
- Impatiens grandis B.Heyne
- Impatiens grandisepala Grey-Wilson
- Impatiens grandispora Nampy & M.Vishnu
- Impatiens granulifera H.Perrier
- Impatiens grey-wilsonii Eb.Fisch.
- Impatiens griersonii S.Akiyama, H.Ohba & M.Suzuki
- Impatiens guillaumetii Eb.Fisch. & Raheliv.
- Impatiens guiqingensis S.X.Yu
- Impatiens guizhouensis Y.L.Chen

== H-K ==
- Impatiens hainanensis Y.L.Chen
- Impatiens haingosonii Eb.Fisch. & Raheliv.
- Impatiens halongensis Kiew & T.H.Nguyên
- Impatiens hamata Warb.
- Impatiens hambaeksanensis B.U.Oh
- Impatiens hancockii C.H.Wright
- Impatiens harae H.Ohba & S.Akiyama
- Impatiens haridasanii Hareesh & M.Sabu
- Impatiens harmandii Hook.f.
- Impatiens hartnolliae Hook.f. ex Ruchis. & Suksathan
- Impatiens hawkeri W.Bull
- Impatiens hedbergiae Eb.Fisch.
- Impatiens helferi Hook.f.
- Impatiens henanensis Y.L.Chen
- Impatiens hendrikii Eb.Fisch. & Raheliv.
- Impatiens hengduanensis Y.L.Chen
- Impatiens henryi E.Pritz.
- Impatiens henslowiana Arn.
- Impatiens herbicola Hook.f.
- Impatiens herzogii K.Schum.
- Impatiens heterosepala Hook.f.
- Impatiens hians Hook.f.
- Impatiens hildebrandtii Baill.
- Impatiens hirsuta (Blume) Steud.
- Impatiens hirta L.Joseph & Bhaskar
- Impatiens hobsonii Hook.f.
- Impatiens hochstetteri Warb.
- Impatiens hoehnelii T.C.E.Fr.
- Impatiens holocentra Hand.-Mazz.
- Impatiens hongkongensis Grey-Wilson
- Impatiens hongsonensis T.Shimizu
- Impatiens hookeriana Arn.
- Impatiens horizontalis Latt, B.B.Park & Nob.Tanaka
- Impatiens huangyanensis X.F.Jin & B.Y.Ding
- Impatiens humbertii H.Perrier
- Impatiens humblotiana Baill.
- Impatiens humifusa G.M.Schulze
- Impatiens humilis Hook.f.
- Impatiens hunanensis Y.L.Chen
- Impatiens hydrogetonoides Launert
- Impatiens hypophylla Makino
- Impatiens idukkiana V.S.A.Kumar & Sindhu Arya
- Impatiens idumishmiensis Gogoi, W.Adamowski, Borah & Chhetri
- Impatiens imbecilla Hook.f.
- Impatiens imbricata H.Perrier
- Impatiens inaperta (H.Perrier) H.Perrier
- Impatiens inayatii Hook.f.
- Impatiens inconspicua Benth. ex Wight & Arn.
- Impatiens infirma Hook.f.
- Impatiens infundibularis Hook.f.
- Impatiens insignis DC.
- Impatiens ioides G.M.Schulze
- Impatiens irangiensis Eb.Fisch.
- Impatiens irvingii Hook.f.
- Impatiens issembei S.B.Janssens, Stévart & Eb.Fisch.
- Impatiens iteberoensis R.Wilczek & G.M.Schulze
- Impatiens ivohibensis H.Perrier
- Impatiens jacobdevlasii Herath, C.Bandara & Gopallawa
- Impatiens jaeschkei Hook.f.
- Impatiens jangjeonensis B.U.Oh
- Impatiens janthina Thwaites
- Impatiens javensis (Blume) Steud.
- Impatiens jenjittikuliae Ruchis. & Suksathan
- Impatiens jerdoniae Wight
- Impatiens jiewhoei Triboun & Suksathan
- Impatiens jinggangensis Y.L.Chen
- Impatiens jinpingensis Y.M.Shui & G.F.Li
- Impatiens jiulongshanica Y.L.Xu & Y.L.Chen
- Impatiens joachimii G.M.Schulze
- Impatiens johnii E.Barnes
- Impatiens johnsiana Ratheesh, Sunil & Anil Kumar
- Impatiens josephia Sinj.Thomas, B.Mani & Britto
- Impatiens junghuhnii Miq.
- Impatiens jurpia Buch.-Ham.
- Impatiens justicioides H.Perrier
- Impatiens kachinensis Hook.f. ex Toppin
- Impatiens kagamei Eb.Fisch.
- Impatiens kamerunensis Warb.
- Impatiens kamrupana Gogoi, J.Sarma & Borah
- Impatiens kanburiensis T.Shimizu
- Impatiens kanchigandhiana Rasingam, Karthig. & Gogoi
- Impatiens karenensis Paing & Ruchis.
- Impatiens karuppusamyi P.S.S.Rich. & V.Ravich.
- Impatiens kathmanduensis Grey-Wilson
- Impatiens katjae Nob.Tanaka & J.J.Verm.
- Impatiens kaweesakii Suksathan
- Impatiens kawttyana Chhabra & Ramneek
- Impatiens keilii Gilg
- Impatiens kentrodonta Gilg
- Impatiens keralensis Sarav. & Kaliam.
- Impatiens kerinciensis Utami
- Impatiens kerriae Craib
- Impatiens kharensis S.Akiyama, H.Ohba & Wakab.
- Impatiens khasiana Hook.f.
- Impatiens kilimanjari Oliv.
- Impatiens kinabaluensis S.Akiyama & H.Ohba
- Impatiens kingdon-wardii Nob.Tanaka & T.Sugaw.
- Impatiens kingii Hook.f.
- Impatiens kivuensis Eb.Fisch., Abrah., Holstein & S.B.Janssens
- Impatiens kleiniformis Sedgw.
- Impatiens klemmeana Hook.f.
- Impatiens klossii Ridl.
- Impatiens kodachadriensis Bhaskar & Sringesw.
- Impatiens kotebettii Bhaskar & Sringesw.
- Impatiens kraftii Eb.Fisch., Wohlh. & Raheliv.
- Impatiens kuepferi Eb.Fisch. & Raheliv.
- Impatiens kulamavuensis A.G.Pandurangan & V.J.Nair
- Impatiens kunyitensis Utami
- Impatiens kurichiarmalayana Sarav. & Kaliam.
- Impatiens kwengeensis R.Wilczek & G.M.Schulze

== L ==
- Impatiens labordei Hook.f.
- Impatiens lacei Hook.f.
- Impatiens lachnosperma H.Perrier
- Impatiens lacinulifera Y.L.Chen
- Impatiens laevigata Wall. ex Hook.f. & Thomson
- Impatiens lampungensis Grey-Wilson
- Impatiens lancisepala S.H.Huang
- Impatiens lanessanii Hook.f.
- Impatiens langbianensis Tardieu
- Impatiens langeana Hook.f.
- Impatiens lantziana Baill.
- Impatiens laojunshanensis S.H.Huang
- Impatiens laotica Tardieu
- Impatiens larsenii T.Shimizu
- Impatiens lasiophyton Hook.f.
- Impatiens latebracteata Hook.f.
- Impatiens lateristachys Y.L.Chen & Y.Q.Lu
- Impatiens laticornis C.E.C.Fisch.
- Impatiens latiflora Hook.f. & Thomson
- Impatiens latifolia L.
- Impatiens latipetala S.H.Huang
- Impatiens laumonieri T.Shimizu
- Impatiens laurentii Eb.Fisch. & Raheliv.
- Impatiens lawii Hook.f. & Thomson
- Impatiens lawsonii Hook.f.
- Impatiens laxiflora Edgew.
- Impatiens lecomtei Hook.f.
- Impatiens leedalii Grey-Wilson
- Impatiens lemannii Hook.f. & Thomson
- Impatiens lemeei H.Lév.
- Impatiens lemuriana Eb.Fisch. & Raheliv.
- Impatiens lenta Hook.f.
- Impatiens lepida Hook.f.
- Impatiens leptocarpa Hook.f.
- Impatiens leptocaulon Hook.f.
- Impatiens leptoceras DC.
- Impatiens leptopoda Arn.
- Impatiens leptura Hook.f.
- Impatiens leschenaultii (DC.) Wall.
- Impatiens letestuana N.Hallé
- Impatiens letouzeyi Grey-Wilson
- Impatiens leucantha Thwaites
- Impatiens leveillei Hook.f.
- Impatiens levingei Gamble ex Hook.f.
- Impatiens lhunzeensis J.Tian, G.W.Hu & Q.F.Wang
- Impatiens liangshanensis Q.Luo
- Impatiens liboensis K.M.Liu & R.P.Kuang
- Impatiens ligulata Bedd.
- Impatiens lilacina Hook.f.
- Impatiens limnophila Launert
- Impatiens linearifolia Warb.
- Impatiens linearis Arn.
- Impatiens linearisepala S.Akiyama, H.Ohba & S.K.Wu
- Impatiens linghziensis Y.L.Chen
- Impatiens linocentra Hand.-Mazz.
- Impatiens liupanshuiensis X.X.Bai & T.H.Yuan
- Impatiens lixianensis S.X.Yu
- Impatiens lizipingensis Q.Luo
- Impatiens lobbiana Turcz.
- Impatiens lobulifera S.X.Yu, Y.L.Chen & H.N.Qin
- Impatiens loheri Hook.f.
- Impatiens lohitensis Gogoi & Borah
- Impatiens loki-schmidtiae Eb.Fisch. & Raheliv.
- Impatiens lokohensis Humbert & H.Perrier
- Impatiens longecauda Harsh Singh & Aashish Kumar
- Impatiens longepedunculata H.Perrier
- Impatiens longialata E.Pritz.
- Impatiens longicalcarata Tardieu
- Impatiens longicornuta Y.L.Chen
- Impatiens longiloba Craib
- Impatiens longipes Hook.f. & Thomson
- Impatiens longirostris S.H.Huang
- Impatiens longlinensis S.X.Yu
- Impatiens longyangensis Y.Y.Cong, G.W.Hu & S.Peng
- Impatiens lotteri Eb.Fisch., Abrah., Holstein & S.B.Janssens
- Impatiens loulanensis Hook.f.
- Impatiens luchunensis S.Akiyama, H.Ohba & S.K.Wu
- Impatiens lucorum Hook.f.
- Impatiens ludewigii Eb.Fisch., Abrah., Holstein & S.B.Janssens
- Impatiens lugubris H.Perrier
- Impatiens luisae-echterae Eb.Fisch., Wohlh. & Raheliv.
- Impatiens lukwangulensis Grey-Wilson
- Impatiens lushiensis Y.L.Chen
- Impatiens luteola Tardieu
- Impatiens luteoviridis H.Perrier
- Impatiens lutzii Eb.Fisch. & Raheliv.
- Impatiens lutzmanniae Eb.Fisch., Abrah., Holstein & S.B.Janssens
- Impatiens lyallii Baker

== M ==
- Impatiens maackii Hook. ex Kom.
- Impatiens mackeyana Hook.f.
- Impatiens macrantha S.X.Yu & Ying Qin
- Impatiens macrocarpa Hook.f.
- Impatiens macrophylla Gardner ex Hook.
- Impatiens macroptera Hook.f.
- Impatiens macrosepala Hook.f.
- Impatiens macrovexilla Y.L.Chen
- Impatiens maculata Wight
- Impatiens maculifera S.X.Yu & Chang Y.Xia
- Impatiens madagascariensis (G.Don) Wight & Arn.
- Impatiens madapurae Bhaskar & Sringesw.
- Impatiens maevae Eb.Fisch. & Raheliv.
- Impatiens maguanensis S.Akiyama, H.Ohba & S.K.Wu
- Impatiens mahalevonensis Eb.Fisch. & Raheliv.
- Impatiens mahengeensis Grey-Wilson
- Impatiens mairei H.Lév.
- Impatiens majumdarii Ghara & Ghora
- Impatiens majungensis H.Perrier
- Impatiens malcomberi Eb.Fisch. & Raheliv.
- Impatiens malipoensis S.H.Huang
- Impatiens mamasensis Utami & Wiriad.
- Impatiens mamyi Eb.Fisch. & Raheliv.
- Impatiens manaharensis Baill.
- Impatiens mananteninae Eb.Fisch. & Raheliv.
- Impatiens mandrakae Eb.Fisch. & Raheliv.
- Impatiens mandrarensis Eb.Fisch. & Raheliv.
- Impatiens manillensis Walp.
- Impatiens mankulamensis K.M.P.Kumar, R.Jagad. & Nagaraj
- Impatiens mannii Hook.f.
- Impatiens manongarivensis H.Perrier
- Impatiens manteroana Exell
- Impatiens margaritifera Hook.f.
- Impatiens marianae Van Geert
- Impatiens marivorahonensis Humbert
- Impatiens marojejyensis Humbert & H.Perrier
- Impatiens marronina Utami
- Impatiens martini Hook.f.
- Impatiens masisiensis De Wild.
- Impatiens masoalensis H.Perrier
- Impatiens masonii Hook.f.
- Impatiens matthewiana Ramas. & Pandur.
- Impatiens max-huberi Eb.Fisch. & Raheliv.
- Impatiens mayae-valeriae Eb.Fisch. & Raheliv.
- Impatiens mazumbaiensis Grey-Wilson
- Impatiens medogensis Y.L.Chen
- Impatiens meeboldii Hook.f.
- Impatiens meeuseiana H.Perrier
- Impatiens megacalyx Y.H.Tan & H.B.Ding
- Impatiens megamalayana Ramas.
- Impatiens membranifolia Franch. ex Hook.f.
- Impatiens mendoncae G.M.Schulze
- Impatiens menghuochengensis Q.Luo
- Impatiens meruensis Gilg
- Impatiens messmerae Eb.Fisch. & Raheliv.
- Impatiens messumbaensis G.M.Schulze
- Impatiens mexicana Rydb.
- Impatiens meyana Hook.f.
- Impatiens microcentra Hand.-Mazz.
- Impatiens microceras Backer
- Impatiens micromeris Hook.f.
- Impatiens micropsitta Suksathan & Ruchis.
- Impatiens microstachys Hook.f.
- Impatiens mildbraedii Gilg
- Impatiens minae Ratheesh, Anil Kumar & Sivad.
- Impatiens mindiae Eb.Fisch., Wohlh. & Raheliv.
- Impatiens miniata Grey-Wilson
- Impatiens minimisepala Hook.f.
- Impatiens minnamparaensis Sindhu Arya, Ambika, Alen Alex, V.Suresh, Sojan & V.S.A.Kuma
- Impatiens minor (DC.) Bennet
- Impatiens mirabilis Hook.f.
- Impatiens modesta Wight
- Impatiens mogangensis Y.M.Shui & W.H.Chen
- Impatiens mohana Ratheesh, Sujana & Anil Kumar
- Impatiens mokimi Hook.f.
- Impatiens mooreana Schltr.
- Impatiens morsei Hook.f.
- Impatiens msisimwanensis S.B.Janssens & E.B.Knox
- Impatiens muelleri Tardieu
- Impatiens muliensis Y.L.Chen
- Impatiens mullaingiriensis Bhaskar
- Impatiens multiramea S.H.Huang
- Impatiens munnarensis E.Barnes
- Impatiens munroi Wight
- Impatiens munronii Wight
- Impatiens muscicola Craib
- Impatiens mussotii Hook.f.
- Impatiens musyana Hook.f.
- Impatiens mysorensis Roth

== N-O ==
- Impatiens nagorum Gogoi, Moaakum & S.Dey
- Impatiens nakhonsiensis Suksathan & Triboun
- Impatiens nalampoonii Shimizu
- Impatiens namchabarwensis R.J.Morgan, Y.M.Yuan & X.J.Ge
- Impatiens namkatensis T.Shimizu
- Impatiens nana Engl. & Warb.
- Impatiens nanatonanensis Eb.Fisch. & Raheliv.
- Impatiens nanensis Suksathan & Srisanga
- Impatiens nanlingensis A.Q.Dong & F.W.Xing
- Impatiens napoensis Y.L.Chen
- Impatiens nasuta Hook.f.
- Impatiens navicula Eb.Fisch. & Raheliv.
- Impatiens ndovu Gavin-Smyth
- Impatiens neglecta Y.L.Xu & Y.L.Chen
- Impatiens neo-orchioides V.Ravich., Murug., B.Karthik, Tharani & Premk.
- Impatiens neobarnesii C.E.C.Fisch.
- Impatiens neomodesta Hareesh, K.M.P.Kumar & V.B.Sreek.
- Impatiens neomunronii L.Joseph & Bhaskar
- Impatiens neouncinata V.S.A.Kumar & Sindhu Arya
- Impatiens nguruensis Pócs
- Impatiens niamniamensis Gilg
- Impatiens nicolliae Eb.Fisch. & Raheliv.
- Impatiens nicolsoniana Gogoi & Arisdason
- Impatiens nidholapathra M.Vishnu & Nampy
- Impatiens nidus-apis Eb.Fisch. & Raheliv.
- Impatiens nigeriensis Grey-Wilson
- Impatiens nigrescens Hook.f.
- Impatiens nilalohitae Hareesh & M.Sabu
- Impatiens nilgirica C.E.C.Fisch.
- Impatiens nimspurjae Raskoti
- Impatiens nivea Schltr.
- Impatiens nobilis Hook.f.
- Impatiens noei Craib
- Impatiens noli-tangere L.
- Impatiens nomenyae Eb.Fisch. & Raheliv.
- Impatiens nosymangabensis Eb.Fisch. & Raheliv.
- Impatiens notolopha Maxim.
- Impatiens nubigena W.W.Sm.
- Impatiens nurae Souvann. & Suksathan
- Impatiens nuristanica Grey-Wilson
- Impatiens nusbaumeri Eb.Fisch. & Raheliv.
- Impatiens nushanensis Zi Wang, P.P.Wu & S.X.Yu
- Impatiens nyimana C.Marquand & Airy Shaw
- Impatiens nyungwensis Eb.Fisch., J.-B.Dhetchuvi & Ntaganda
- Impatiens nzabiana S.B.Janssens & Dessein
- Impatiens nzoana A.Chev.
- Impatiens obcordifolia Tardieu
- Impatiens obesa Hook.f.
- Impatiens oblongata Ruchis. & Niet
- Impatiens oblongipetala K.M.Liu & Y.Y.Cong
- Impatiens obscura Hook.f.
- Impatiens occultans Hook.f.
- Impatiens odontopetala Maxim.
- Impatiens odontophylla Hook.f.
- Impatiens odontosepala Hook.f.
- Impatiens ohwadae Mikio Watan. & Seriz.
- Impatiens oligoneura Hook.f.
- Impatiens omeiana Hook.f.
- Impatiens omissa Hook.f.
- Impatiens oncidioides Ridl. ex Hook.f.
- Impatiens oniveensis Eb.Fisch. & Raheliv.
- Impatiens opinata Craib
- Impatiens oppositifolia L.
- Impatiens orchioides Bedd.
- Impatiens oreocallis Launert
- Impatiens oreophila Triboun & Suksathan
- Impatiens otto-eleonorae Eb.Fisch. & Raheliv.
- Impatiens oumina N.Hallé
- Impatiens oxyanthera Hook.f.

== P ==
- Impatiens pachycaulon M.F.Newman
- Impatiens pahalgamensis Hook.f.
- Impatiens pallida Nutt.
- Impatiens pallide-rosea Gilg
- Impatiens pallidiflora Hook.f.
- Impatiens pallidissima H.Perrier
- Impatiens palpebrata Hook.f.
- Impatiens paludicola Grey-Wilson
- Impatiens paludosa Hook.f.
- Impatiens pandata E.Barnes
- Impatiens panduranganii K.M.P.Kumar, R.Jagad. & G.Prasad
- Impatiens pandurata Y.H.Tan & S.X.Yu
- Impatiens paradoxa C.S.Zhu & H.W.Yang
- Impatiens paramjitiana Gogoi & Borah
- Impatiens paranyi Eb.Fisch. & Raheliv.
- Impatiens parasitica Bedd.
- Impatiens parishii Hook.f.
- Impatiens parkinsonii C.E.C.Fisch.
- Impatiens parviflora DC.
- Impatiens parvifolia Bedd.
- Impatiens parvigaleata H.Perrier
- Impatiens parvisepala S.X.Yu & Y.T.Hou
- Impatiens pasighatensis D.Borah, R.Kr.Singh & Taram
- Impatiens pathakiana Gogoi & Borah
- Impatiens patula Craib
- Impatiens paucidentata De Wild.
- Impatiens paucisemina H.Perrier
- Impatiens peguana Hook.f.
- Impatiens pellucidinervia H.Perrier
- Impatiens peltata Hook.f.
- Impatiens pendula B.Heyne ex Wight & Arn.
- Impatiens peperomioides H.Perrier
- Impatiens percordata Grey-Wilson
- Impatiens percrenata H.Perrier
- Impatiens perezii Teijsm. ex Miq.
- Impatiens perfecunda H.Perrier
- Impatiens periyarensis B.Mani, Sinj.Thomas & Britto
- Impatiens perrieri Humbert
- Impatiens phahompokensis T.Shimizu & Suksathan
- Impatiens phasiana Suksathan & Triboun
- Impatiens phayaoensis Suksathan & La-ongsri
- Impatiens phengklaii T.Shimizu & Suksathan
- Impatiens phoenicea Bedd.
- Impatiens phonsenae Ruchis. & Suksathan
- Impatiens phuluangensis Shimizu
- Impatiens pianmaensis S.H.Huang
- Impatiens pierlotii R.Wilczek
- Impatiens pilosissima Eb.Fisch. & Raheliv.
- Impatiens pilosivittata Grey-Wilson
- Impatiens pinetorum Hook.f. ex W.W.Sm.
- Impatiens pinganoensis Abrah., S.B.Janssens, Xixima, Ditsch & Eb.Fisch.
- Impatiens pingxiangensis H.Y.Bi & S.X.Yu
- Impatiens piufanensis Hook.f.
- Impatiens platyadena C.E.C.Fisch.
- Impatiens platyceras Maxim.
- Impatiens platychlaena Hook.f.
- Impatiens platypetala Lindl.
- Impatiens platysepala Y.L.Chen
- Impatiens plicatisepala C.Y.Zou, Yan Liu & S.X.Yu
- Impatiens poculifer Hook.f.
- Impatiens podocarpa Hook.f.
- Impatiens poilanei Tardieu
- Impatiens polhillii Grey-Wilson
- Impatiens polyactina Hook.f.
- Impatiens polyantha Gilg
- Impatiens polyceras Hook.f. ex W.W.Sm.
- Impatiens polyneura K.M.Liu
- Impatiens polyphylla Warb.
- Impatiens polysciadia Hook.f.
- Impatiens poomae Suksathan & Ruchis.
- Impatiens porrecta Wall. ex Hook.f. & Thomson
- Impatiens potaninii Maxim.
- Impatiens pradhanii H.Hara
- Impatiens prainii Hook.f.
- Impatiens prasiniflora H.Perrier
- Impatiens preussii Warb.
- Impatiens principis Hook.f.
- Impatiens pritzelii Hook.f.
- Impatiens procumbens Franch.
- Impatiens prostrata Hook.f.
- Impatiens protracta Hook.f.
- Impatiens pseudoacaulis Bhaskar
- Impatiens pseudocitrina Hareesh, M.Sabu & Gogoi
- Impatiens pseudohamata Grey-Wilson
- Impatiens pseudokingii Hand.-Mazz.
- Impatiens pseudolaevigata Gogoi, B.B.T.Tham & Lidén
- Impatiens pseudolongipes Gogoi, Sherpa & Borah
- Impatiens pseudomacroptera Grey-Wilson
- Impatiens pseudoperezii Grey-Wilson
- Impatiens pseudoviola Gilg
- Impatiens pseudozombensis Grey-Wilson
- Impatiens psittacina Hook.f.
- Impatiens psittacula Suksathan & Ruchis.
- Impatiens psychadelphoides Launert
- Impatiens pterocaulis S.X.Yu & L.R.Zhang
- Impatiens pterosepala Hook.f.
- Impatiens puberula DC.
- Impatiens pudica Hook.f.
- Impatiens pulcherrima Dalzell
- Impatiens pulchra Hook.f. & Thomson
- Impatiens punaensis Wiriad. & Utami
- Impatiens purpurea Hand.-Mazz.
- Impatiens purpureifolia S.H.Huang & Y.M.Shui
- Impatiens purpureocoerulea Tardieu
- Impatiens purpureolucida Eb.Fisch., Wohlh. & Raheliv.
- Impatiens purpureoscorpioides Triboun, Tanutong & Ruchis.
- Impatiens purpureoviolacea Gilg
- Impatiens purroi Eb.Fisch., Wohlh. & Raheliv.
- Impatiens putii Craib
- Impatiens pygmaea Hook.f.
- Impatiens pyrorhiza Lidén & Bharali
- Impatiens pyrrhotricha Miq.

== Q-R ==
- Impatiens qingchengshanica Y.M.Yuan, Y.Song & X.J.Ge
- Impatiens quadriloba K.M.Liu & Y.L.Xiang
- Impatiens quadrisepala R.Wilczek & G.M.Schulze
- Impatiens quintadecimacopii G.W.Hu & Q.F.Wang
- Impatiens quisqualis Launert
- Impatiens racemosa DC.
- Impatiens racemulosa Wall. ex Hook.f. & Thomson
- Impatiens radiata Hook.f.
- Impatiens radicans Zoll. & Moritzi
- Impatiens rajibgogoii Sherpa, M.Khanal & M.Chettri
- Impatiens rakotomalazana Eb.Fisch. & Raheliv.
- Impatiens raktakesara M.Vishnu & Nampy
- Impatiens ramenensis H.Perrier
- Impatiens ramosa Tardieu
- Impatiens ramosi Hook.f.
- Impatiens rangoonensis Hook.f.
- Impatiens ranomafanae Eb.Fisch. & Raheliv.
- Impatiens rapanarivoi Eb.Fisch. & Raheliv.
- Impatiens raphidothrix Warb.
- Impatiens rapiformis Y.Y.Cong & Y.X.Song
- Impatiens rara Tardieu
- Impatiens razanatsoa-charlei Eb.Fisch. & Raheliv.
- Impatiens raziana Bhaskar & Razi
- Impatiens rectangula Hand.-Mazz.
- Impatiens rectirostrata Y.L.Chen & Y.Q.Lu
- Impatiens recurvicornis Maxim.
- Impatiens recurvinervia H.Perrier
- Impatiens reidii Hook.f.
- Impatiens renae Eb.Fisch. & Raheliv.
- Impatiens repens Moon ex Wight
- Impatiens rhinoceros H.Perrier
- Impatiens ridleyi Hook.f.
- Impatiens rivularis Eb.Fisch., Wohlh. & Raheliv.
- Impatiens rivulicola Hook.f.
- Impatiens rizaliana Hook.f.
- Impatiens robusta Hook.f.
- Impatiens rosea Lindl.
- Impatiens rostellata Franch.
- Impatiens rostrata Souvann. & Lanors.
- Impatiens rosulata Grey-Wilson
- Impatiens rothii Hook.f.
- Impatiens rubricaulis Utami
- Impatiens rubricolor Tardieu
- Impatiens rubriflora Grey-Wilson
- Impatiens rubromaculata Warb.
- Impatiens rudicaulis H.Perrier
- Impatiens rufescens Benth. ex Wight & Arn.
- Impatiens rugata S.H.Huang & Y.M.Shui
- Impatiens rugosipetala Gogoi & Borah
- Impatiens ruiliensis S.Akiyama & H.Ohba
- Impatiens runssorensis Warb.
- Impatiens rupestris K.M.Liu & X.Z.Cai
- Impatiens rupicola Hook.f.
- Impatiens rutenbergii O.Hoffm.
- Impatiens ruthiae Suksathan & Triboun

== S ==
- Impatiens sacculata Warb.
- Impatiens sacculifera H.Perrier
- Impatiens sahyadrica V.B.Sreek., Hareesh, Dantas & Sujanapal
- Impatiens sakeriana Hook.f.
- Impatiens salaengensis T.Shimizu
- Impatiens saliensis G.M.Schulze
- Impatiens salifii Eb.Fisch. & Raheliv.
- Impatiens salimii K.M.P.Kumar & Reshma
- Impatiens salpinx G.M.Schulze & Launert
- Impatiens salwinensis S.H.Huang
- Impatiens sambiranensis H.Perrier
- Impatiens santisukii T.Shimizu
- Impatiens saolana Eb.Fisch. & Raheliv.
- Impatiens sarawakensis T.Shimizu
- Impatiens sarissiformis C.E.C.Fisch.
- Impatiens sashinborthakurii Gogoi, Sherpa & Murug.
- Impatiens sasidharanii K.M.P.Kumar, Omalsree, Hareesh & V.B.Sreek.
- Impatiens saulierea B.Mani, S.Thomas & Britto
- Impatiens saxicola Craib
- Impatiens scabrida DC.
- Impatiens scabriuscula B.Heyne ex Wall.
- Impatiens scapiflora B.Heyne ex Wall.
- Impatiens scenarioi Eb.Fisch. & Raheliv.
- Impatiens schlechteri Warb.
- Impatiens scitula Hook.f.
- Impatiens scortechinii Hook.f.
- Impatiens scripta H.Perrier
- Impatiens scutisepala Hook.f.
- Impatiens semounensis Hook.f.
- Impatiens serpens Grey-Wilson
- Impatiens serrata Benth.
- Impatiens serratifolia Hook.f.
- Impatiens serusiauxii Eb.Fisch., Raheliv. & Killmann
- Impatiens shailajae Sindhu Arya & V.S.A.Kumar
- Impatiens shangjiangensis Y.Y.Cong & J.Z.Gu
- Impatiens shaolinchiana S.S.Ying
- Impatiens shenglaniae Q.L.Gan & Xin W.Li
- Impatiens shennongensis Qiang Wang & H.P.Deng
- Impatiens shevaroyensis Bhaskar
- Impatiens shimianensis G.C.Zhang & L.B.Zhang
- Impatiens shimizuana Suksathan & Ruchis.
- Impatiens shirensis Baker f.
- Impatiens shiyomiensis Hareesh & M.Sabu
- Impatiens sholayarensis M.Kumar & Sequiera
- Impatiens siamensis T.Shimizu
- Impatiens siangensis Gogoi
- Impatiens siculifera Hook.f.
- Impatiens sidiformis Eb.Fisch. & Raheliv.
- Impatiens sidikalangensis Grey-Wilson
- Impatiens sigmoidea Hook.f.
- Impatiens sikaiensis Q.Luo & Ying Yuan
- Impatiens silvestrii Pamp.
- Impatiens silviana Eb.Fisch. & Raheliv.
- Impatiens simbiniensis Grey-Wilson
- Impatiens singgalangensis Grey-Wilson
- Impatiens sinlumiensis Grey-Wilson
- Impatiens sirindhorniae Triboun & Suksathan
- Impatiens smetsiana S.B.Janssens, Taedoumg & Dessein
- Impatiens smitinandii Shimizu
- Impatiens sodenii Engl. & Warb.
- Impatiens sorikensis Utami
- Impatiens soulieana Hook.f.
- Impatiens spathulata Y.X.Xiong
- Impatiens spathulifera H.Perrier
- Impatiens spectabilis Triboun & Suksathan
- Impatiens spiralis Y.Y.Cong, Gui L.Zhang & Y.Ming Zheng
- Impatiens spireana Hook.f.
- Impatiens spirifera Hook.f. & Thomson
- Impatiens spissiflora Hook.f.
- Impatiens squiresii Tardieu
- Impatiens steenisii Grey-Wilson
- Impatiens stefaniae Eb.Fisch. & Raheliv.
- Impatiens stenantha Hook.f.
- Impatiens stenosepala E.Pritz.
- Impatiens sterilis Y.Y.Cong & Y.X.Song
- Impatiens stocksii Hook.f. & Thomson
- Impatiens stoliczkae Hook.f.
- Impatiens stolonifera Robi & Manudev
- Impatiens stricta C.B.Clarke ex Hook.f.
- Impatiens stuhlmannii Warb.
- Impatiens subabortiva H.Perrier
- Impatiens subaequalis Craib
- Impatiens subcordata Arn.
- Impatiens subecalcarata (Hand.-Mazz.) Y.L.Chen
- Impatiens subfalcata Soulad. & Tagane
- Impatiens subrubriflora H.Perrier
- Impatiens substerilis H.Perrier
- Impatiens substipulata H.Perrier
- Impatiens suichangensis Y.L.Xu & Y.L.Chen
- Impatiens suijiangensis S.H.Huang
- Impatiens suksathanii Ruchis. & Triboun
- Impatiens sulcata Wall.
- Impatiens sunii S.H.Huang
- Impatiens superglabra (Grey-Wilson) Eb.Fisch., Abrah., Holstein & S.B.Janssens
- Impatiens susan-nathansoniae Eb.Fisch. & Raheliv.
- Impatiens sutchuenensis Franch. ex Hook.f.
- Impatiens sylvicola Burtt Davy & Greenway

== T ==
- Impatiens tafononensis Eb.Fisch. & Raheliv.
- Impatiens taihmushkulni Chhabra & Ramneek
- Impatiens taishunensis Y.L.Chen & Y.L.Xu
- Impatiens tajoensis U.L.Tiwari
- Impatiens talakmauensis Utami
- Impatiens talbotii Hook.f.
- Impatiens tangachee Bedd.
- Impatiens tanintharyiensis Ruchis., Suksathan & Saw-Lwin
- Impatiens tanyae R.Kr.Singh, Arigela & Kabeer
- Impatiens tapanuliensis Grey-Wilson
- Impatiens taprobanica Hiern
- Impatiens tatoensis Gogoi & W.Adamowski
- Impatiens tavoyana Benth. ex Hook.f. & Thomson
- Impatiens tayemonii Hayata
- Impatiens teitensis Grey-Wilson
- Impatiens tenella B.Heyne ex Wight & Arn.
- Impatiens teneriflora Hook.f.
- Impatiens tenerrima Y.L.Chen
- Impatiens tenuibracteata Y.L.Chen
- Impatiens textorii Miq.
- Impatiens thamnoidea G.M.Schulze
- Impatiens theuerkaufiana Ratheesh & Sivad.
- Impatiens thiochroa Hand.-Mazz.
- Impatiens thomensis Exell
- Impatiens thomsonii Hook.f.
- Impatiens thunbergioides Suksathan & Triboun
- Impatiens thwaitesii Hook.f. ex Grey-Wilson
- Impatiens tianlinensis S.X.Yu & L.J.Zhang
- Impatiens tienchuanensis Y.L.Chen
- Impatiens tienmushanica Y.L.Chen
- Impatiens tigrina Suksathan & Triboun
- Impatiens tinctoria A.Rich.
- Impatiens tingens Edgew.
- Impatiens tipusensis M.R.Hend.
- Impatiens tirbinensis Hareesh & M.Sabu
- Impatiens tirunelvelliensis L.Joseph & Bhaskar
- Impatiens tomentella Hook.f.
- Impatiens tomentosa B.Heyne ex Wight & Arn.
- Impatiens toppinii Dunn
- Impatiens torenioides H.Perrier
- Impatiens tortisepala Hook.f.
- Impatiens torulosa Hook.f.
- Impatiens touranensis Tardieu
- Impatiens toxophora Hook.f.
- Impatiens translucida Eb.Fisch. & Raheliv.
- Impatiens travancorica Bedd.
- Impatiens triandra H.Perrier
- Impatiens tribounii T.Shimizu & Suksathan
- Impatiens tribuana Utami & Nurainas
- Impatiens tricarinata H.Perrier
- Impatiens tricaudata G.M.Schulze
- Impatiens trichocarpa Hook.f.
- Impatiens trichoceras Baker
- Impatiens trichopoda Hook.f.
- Impatiens trichosepala Y.L.Chen
- Impatiens trichosperma H.Perrier
- Impatiens tricolor Ridl.
- Impatiens tricornis Lindl.
- Impatiens trigonosepala Hook.f.
- Impatiens trilobata Colebr.
- Impatiens tripetala Roxb. ex DC.
- Impatiens tropaeolifolia Griff. ex Hook.f.
- Impatiens truncata Thwaites
- Impatiens truncicola H.Perrier
- Impatiens tsangshanensis Y.L.Chen
- Impatiens tsararavina Eb.Fisch. & Raheliv.
- Impatiens tsaratananae H.Perrier
- Impatiens tsingycola Eb.Fisch. & Raheliv.
- Impatiens tuberculata Hook.f. & Thomson
- Impatiens tuberifera Humbert
- Impatiens tuberosa H.Perrier
- Impatiens tubulosa F.B.Forbes & Hemsl.
- Impatiens tujuhensis Utami & T.Shimizu
- Impatiens turrialbana Donn.Sm.
- Impatiens tweedieae E.A.Bruce

== U-Z ==
- Impatiens ukagurensis Grey-Wilson
- Impatiens uliginosa Franch.
- Impatiens ulugurensis Warb.
- Impatiens umbellata B.Heyne
- Impatiens uncata Y.Y.Cong & J.J.Zhou
- Impatiens uncinata Wight
- Impatiens uncipetala C.B.Clarke ex Hook.f.
- Impatiens undulata Y.L.Chen & Y.Q.Lu
- Impatiens unguiculata K.M.Liu & Y.Y.Cong
- Impatiens uniflora Hayata
- Impatiens uralensis A.K.Skvortsov
- Impatiens urticifolia Wall.
- Impatiens urticoides H.Perrier
- Impatiens usambarensis Grey-Wilson
- Impatiens uzungwaensis Grey-Wilson & Frim.-Møll.
- Impatiens vaiyapurii Karupp. & V.Ravich.
- Impatiens vaniotiana H.Lév.
- Impatiens vaughanii Hook.f.
- Impatiens vebrowniae Eb.Fisch., Wohlh. & Raheliv.
- Impatiens veerapazhasii Ratheesh, Sujanapal & Meera
- Impatiens velaxata Hook.f.
- Impatiens vellela Eb.Fisch. & Raheliv.
- Impatiens venusta H.Perrier
- Impatiens verecunda Hook.f.
- Impatiens verrucifera Hook.f.
- Impatiens versicolor Eb.Fisch., Abrah., Holstein & S.B.Janssens
- Impatiens verticillata Wight
- Impatiens vesiculifera H.Perrier
- Impatiens vexillaria Hook.f.
- Impatiens vidalii Hook.f.
- Impatiens vidyae R.C.Srivast.
- Impatiens viguieri H.Perrier
- Impatiens vilersii Costantin & Poiss.
- Impatiens vinosa Kiew
- Impatiens violacea M.Kumar & Sequiera
- Impatiens violaceoalba Tardieu
- Impatiens violascens B.U.Oh & Y.Y.Kim
- Impatiens violiflora Hook.f.
- Impatiens violoides Edgew. ex Hook.f.
- Impatiens viridiflora Wight
- Impatiens viscida Wight
- Impatiens viscosa Bedd.
- Impatiens vitellina Grey-Wilson
- Impatiens vittata Franch.
- Impatiens volatianae Eb.Fisch. & Raheliv.
- Impatiens volkensii Warb.
- Impatiens waldheimiana Hook.f.
- Impatiens walkeri Hook. ex Arn.
- Impatiens walleriana Hook.f.
- Impatiens wallichii Hook.f.
- Impatiens walongensis Hareesh, M.Sabu & Borah
- Impatiens warburgiana G.M.Schulze & R.Wilczek
- Impatiens wattii Hook.f.
- Impatiens wawuensis Bo Ding & S.X.Yu
- Impatiens weihsiensis Y.L.Chen
- Impatiens wibkeae Eb.Fisch. & Raheliv.
- Impatiens wightiana Bedd.
- Impatiens wilksiana Stévart, S.B.Janssens & Eb.Fisch.
- Impatiens williamsii H.Hara
- Impatiens wilsonii Hook.f.
- Impatiens winkleri Hook.f.
- Impatiens wirabraja Utami
- Impatiens wohlhauseri Eb.Fisch. & Raheliv.
- Impatiens wolfgangii J.Lali & Bhaskar
- Impatiens wongnakii Suksathan & La-ongsri
- Impatiens wuchengyihii S.Akiyama, H.Ohba & S.K.Wu
- Impatiens wuerstenii S.B.Janssens & Dessein
- Impatiens wutaishanensis R.L.Liao & Lei Cai
- Impatiens wuyiensis J.S.Wang, Y.F.Lu & X.F.Jin
- Impatiens wuyuanensis Y.L.Chen
- Impatiens wynadensis L.Joseph & Bhaskar
- Impatiens xanthina H.F.Comber
- Impatiens xanthinoides G.W.Hu
- Impatiens xanthocephala W.W.Sm.
- Impatiens yangshanensis A.Q.Dong & F.W.Xing
- Impatiens yaojiapingensis Y.Y.Cong, G.W.Hu & T.Hu
- Impatiens yaoshanensis K.M.Liu & Y.Y.Cong
- Impatiens yercaudensis Bhaskar
- Impatiens yilingiana X.F.Jin, Shu Z.Yang & L.Qian
- Impatiens yingjiangensis S.Akiyama & H.Ohba
- Impatiens yingjingensis Xin Q.Song, B.N.Song & Biao Yang
- Impatiens yinyinkyii Latt, B.B.Park & Nob.Tanaka
- Impatiens yongshanensis S.H.Huang
- Impatiens yunlingensis S.X.Yu, Chang Y.Xia & J.H.Yu
- Impatiens yunnanensis Franch.
- Impatiens zhaojueensis Q.Luo
- Impatiens zhuxiensis Q.L.Gan & X.W.Li
- Impatiens zironiana Gogoi, Hareesh & W.Adamowski
- Impatiens zixishanensis S.H.Huang
- Impatiens zombensis Baker
- Impatiens zygosepala Hook.f.

== Hybrids ==
- Impatiens x kaskazinii Grimshaw & Grey-Wilson
- Impatiens x lateritia Gilg
- Impatiens x pacifica Zika
- Impatiens x troupinii Eb.Fisch., Abrah., Holstein & S.B.Janssens

== Newly-described species ==
The following species have been recently described and are not yet listed at POWO as of November 2025:

- Impatiens rajibiana K. Chowlu, A. Shenoy & S. Borah
