= Impatiens rajibiana =

Scientific classification
- Kingdom: Plantae
- Clade: Embryophytes
- Clade: Tracheophytes
- Clade: Spermatophytes
- Clade: Angiosperms
- Clade: Eudicots
- Clade: Asterids
- Order: Ericales
- Family: Balsaminaceae
- Genus: Impatiens
- Species: I. rajibiana

Binomial name
- Impatiens rajibiana Chowlu, Borah & A.Shenoy

Species of balsam

Impatiens rajibiana is a species of flowering plant from the moist forests of Shergaon in West Kameng, Arunachal Pradesh, India. It belongs to the family Balsaminaceae and is known only from this region above roughly 2,000 metres elevation.
