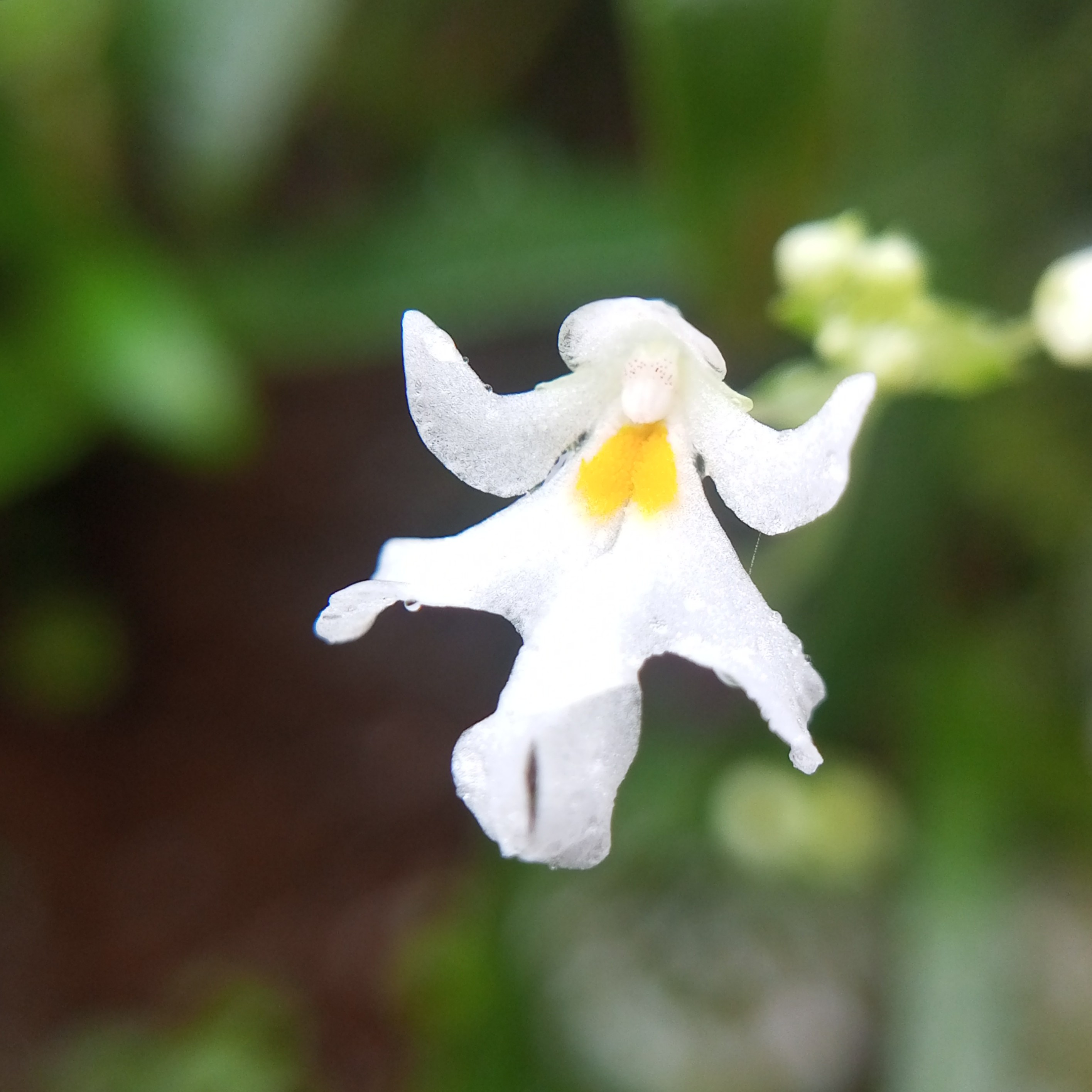

Scientific classification
- Kingdom: Plantae
- Clade: Tracheophytes
- Clade: Angiosperms
- Clade: Eudicots
- Clade: Asterids
- Order: Ericales
- Family: Balsaminaceae
- Genus: Impatiens
- Species: I. stocksii

Binomial name
- Impatiens stocksii Hook.f. & Thomson

= Impatiens stocksii =

Species of plant

Impatiens stocksii is a species of flowering plant in the family Balsaminaceae. It is endemic to the Coorg hills.

== Description ==
It is an epiphytic, scapigerous, tuberous herb, growing up to 15 centimetres (5.9 in) high. There are 2–5 leaves per tuber. The broadly ovate radical leaves are crenate at the margins, pubescent above and glabrous below. The inflorescence, consisting of two to seven flowers, is a racemous scape 3–8.5 cm (1.2–3.3 in) long. The white flowers are 1–1.5 cm (0.4–0.6 in) across with ovate glabrous light green bracts. The lateral sepals are ovate, acute at apex and light green. The white standard petal is suborbicular, forming a small sac-like structure at base. The wing petals are white with a tuft of yellow hairs at the base of the mid-lobe; there are three lobes, with the mid-lobe broader than the distal and basal lobes. The white lip is saccate, deep and acute at the apex, with a yellow spot. The spur is absent.

== Range ==
Southern Western Ghats

== Habitat ==
It grows as an epiphyte in evergreen forests

== Gallery ==
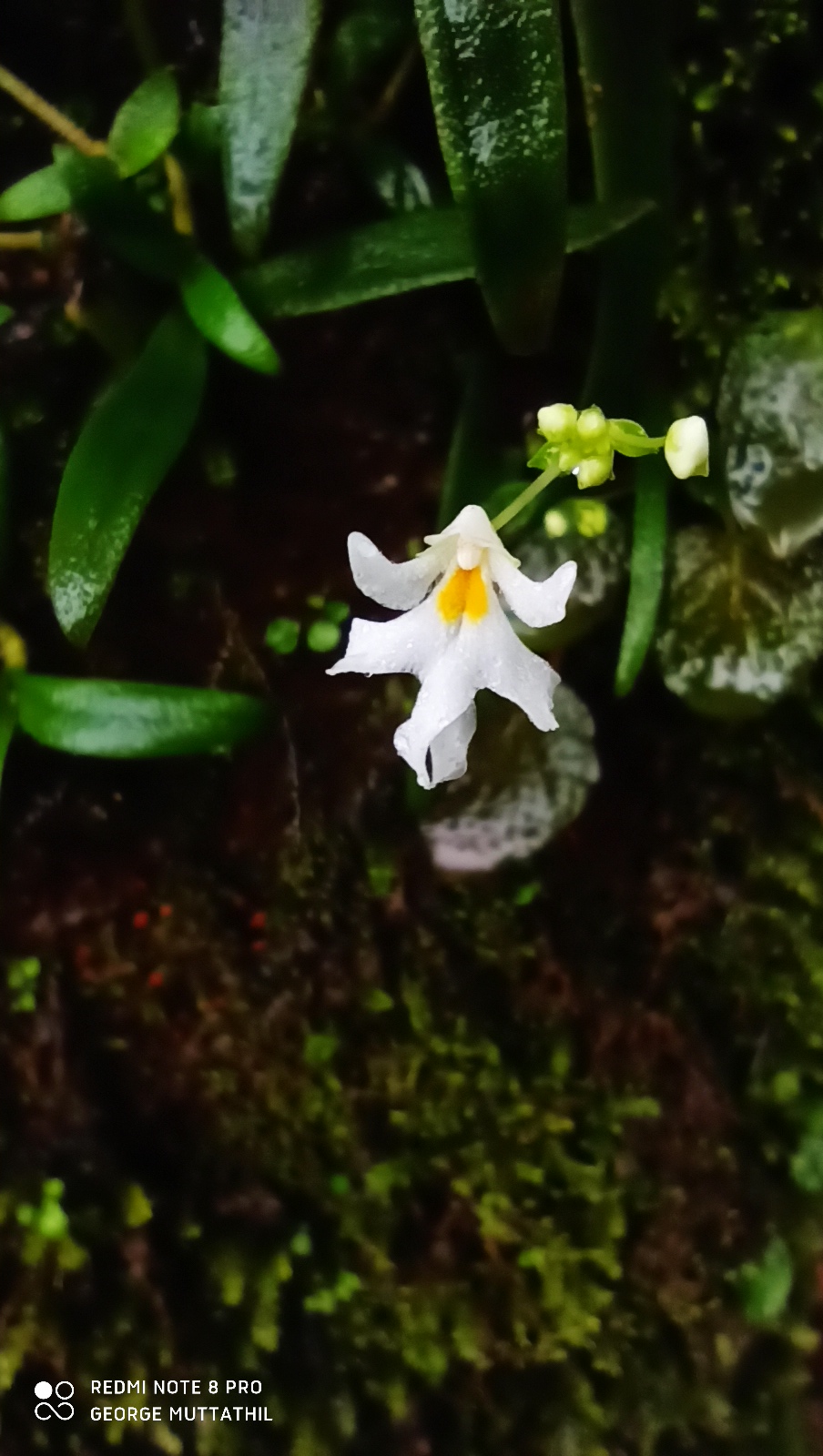

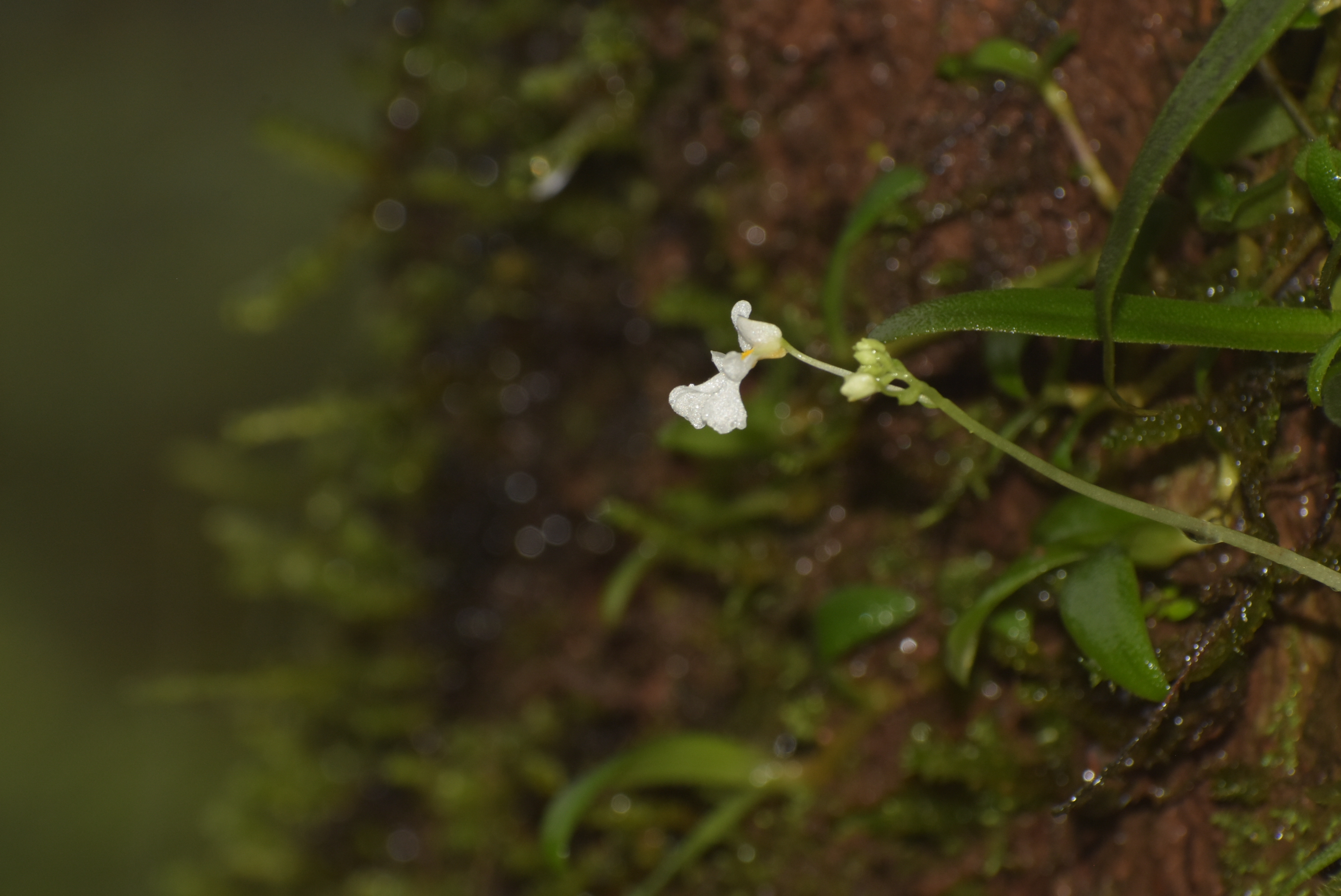

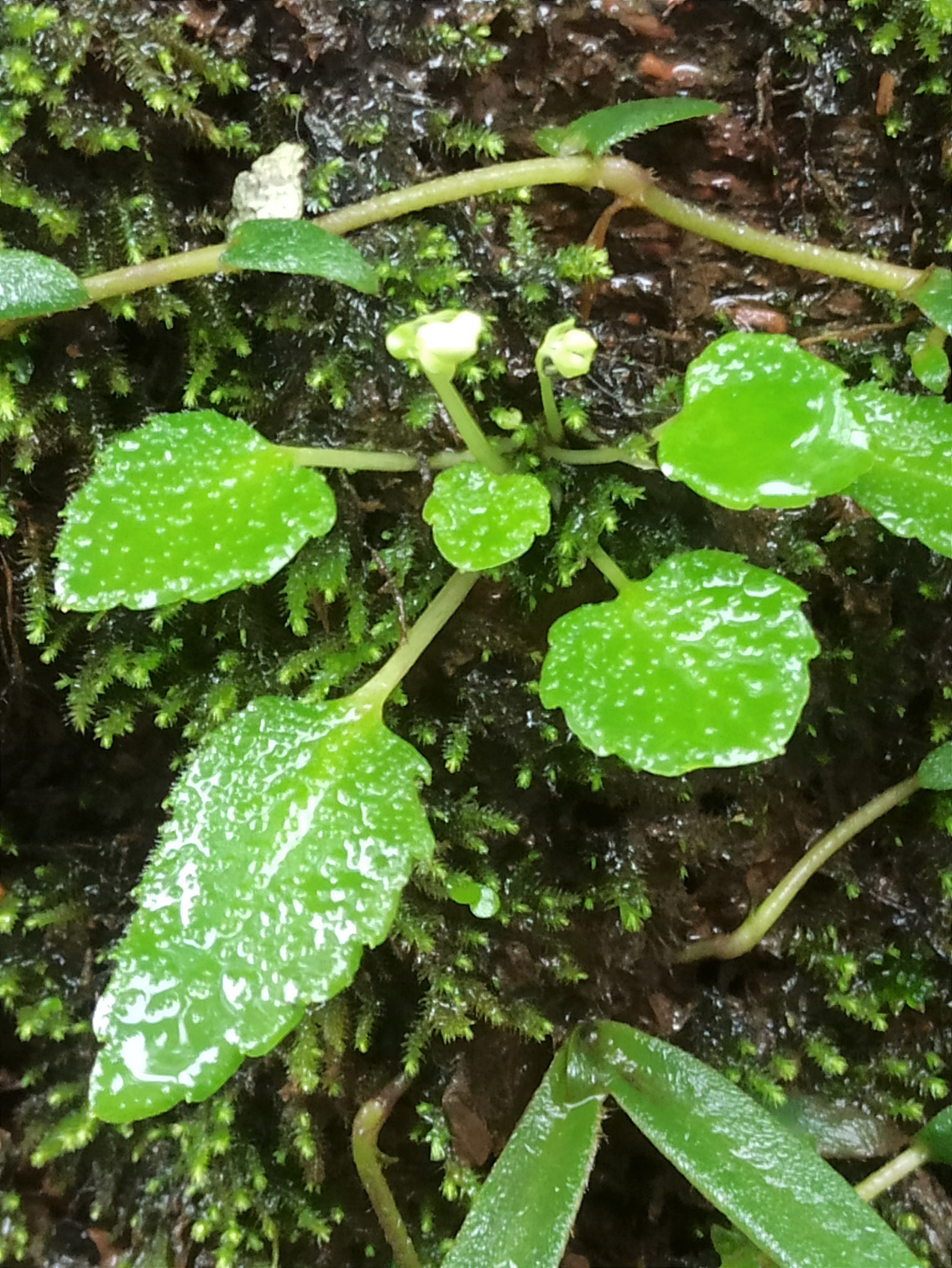
