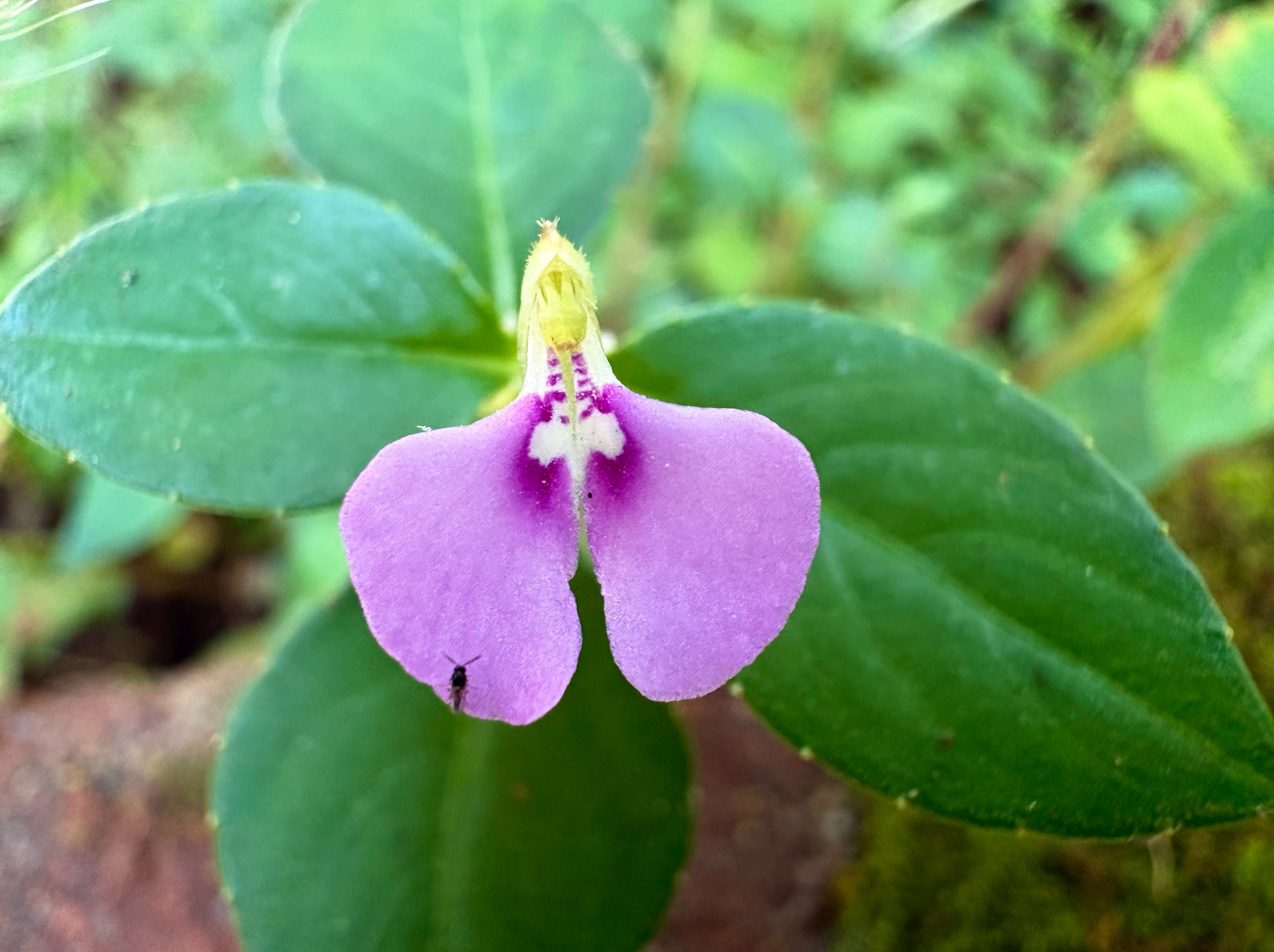

Scientific classification
- Kingdom: Plantae
- Clade: Tracheophytes
- Clade: Angiosperms
- Clade: Eudicots
- Clade: Asterids
- Order: Ericales
- Family: Balsaminaceae
- Genus: Impatiens
- Species: I. minor

Binomial name
- Impatiens minor (DC.) S.M.Almeida

= Impatiens minor =

Species of plant

Impatiens minor, also known by the common name lesser balsam, is a species from the genus Impatiens.
