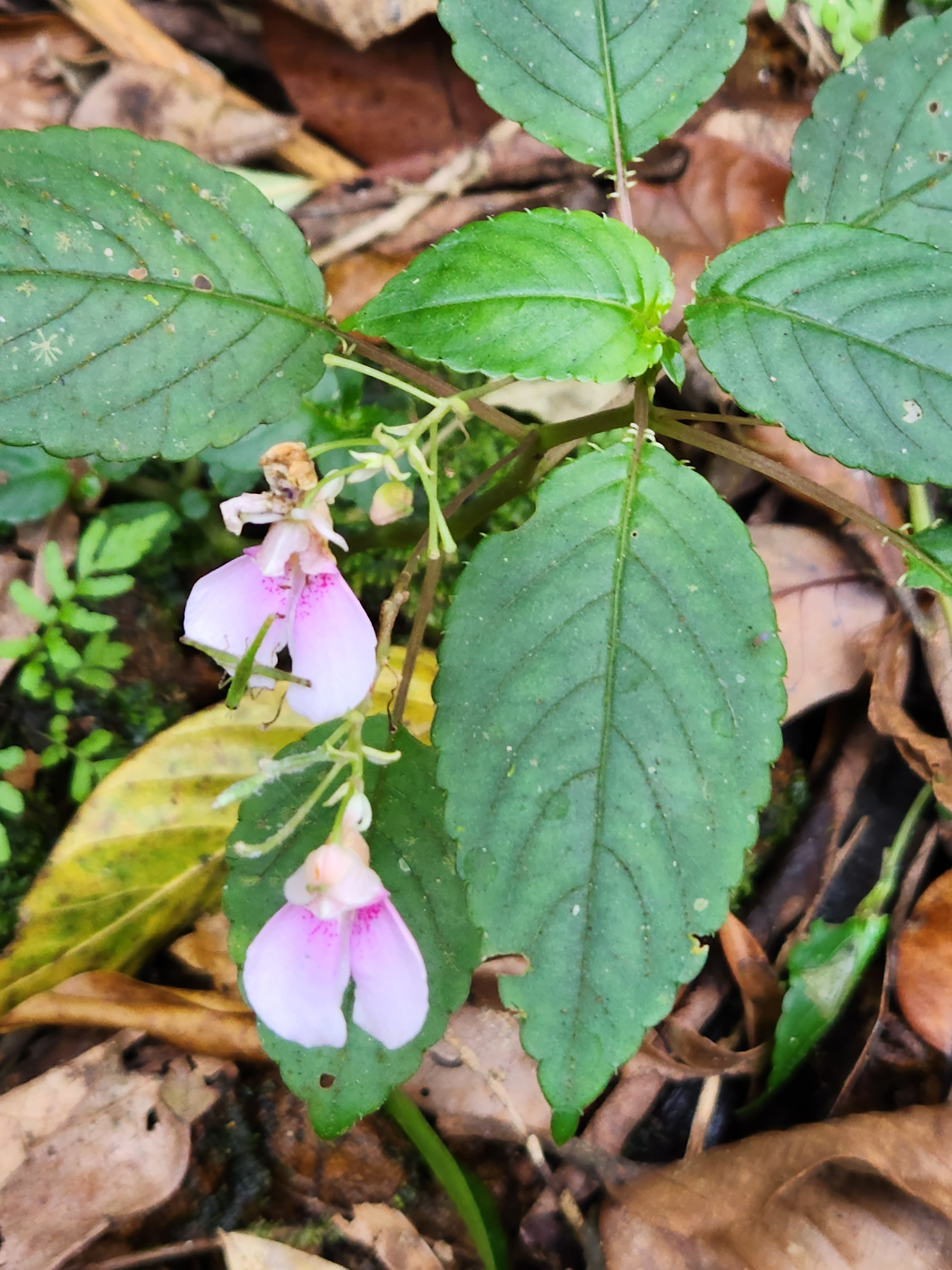

Scientific classification
- Kingdom: Plantae
- Clade: Tracheophytes
- Clade: Angiosperms
- Clade: Eudicots
- Clade: Asterids
- Order: Ericales
- Family: Balsaminaceae
- Genus: Impatiens
- Species: I. uncinata

Binomial name
- Impatiens uncinata Wight

= Impatiens uncinata =

Species of flowering plant

Impatiens uncinata, or hook tailed balsam, is a species of flowering plant belonging to Balsaminaceae family. It is endemic to the Southern Western Ghats at an altitude of 900-1700m.

== Description ==
Impatiens uncinata is an erect sparsely branched annual herb. Alternate leaves have cordate or acute base, rounded toothed margins and acute or acuminate apex. Pink flowers are about 2 cm across. Lateral sepals are obliquely ovate and unusually large for the size of the flower and the plant. Lip is shortly bell shaped. Short and stout spur is inflated in middle, hooked at tip. Fruits are ellipsoid beaked capsules.
