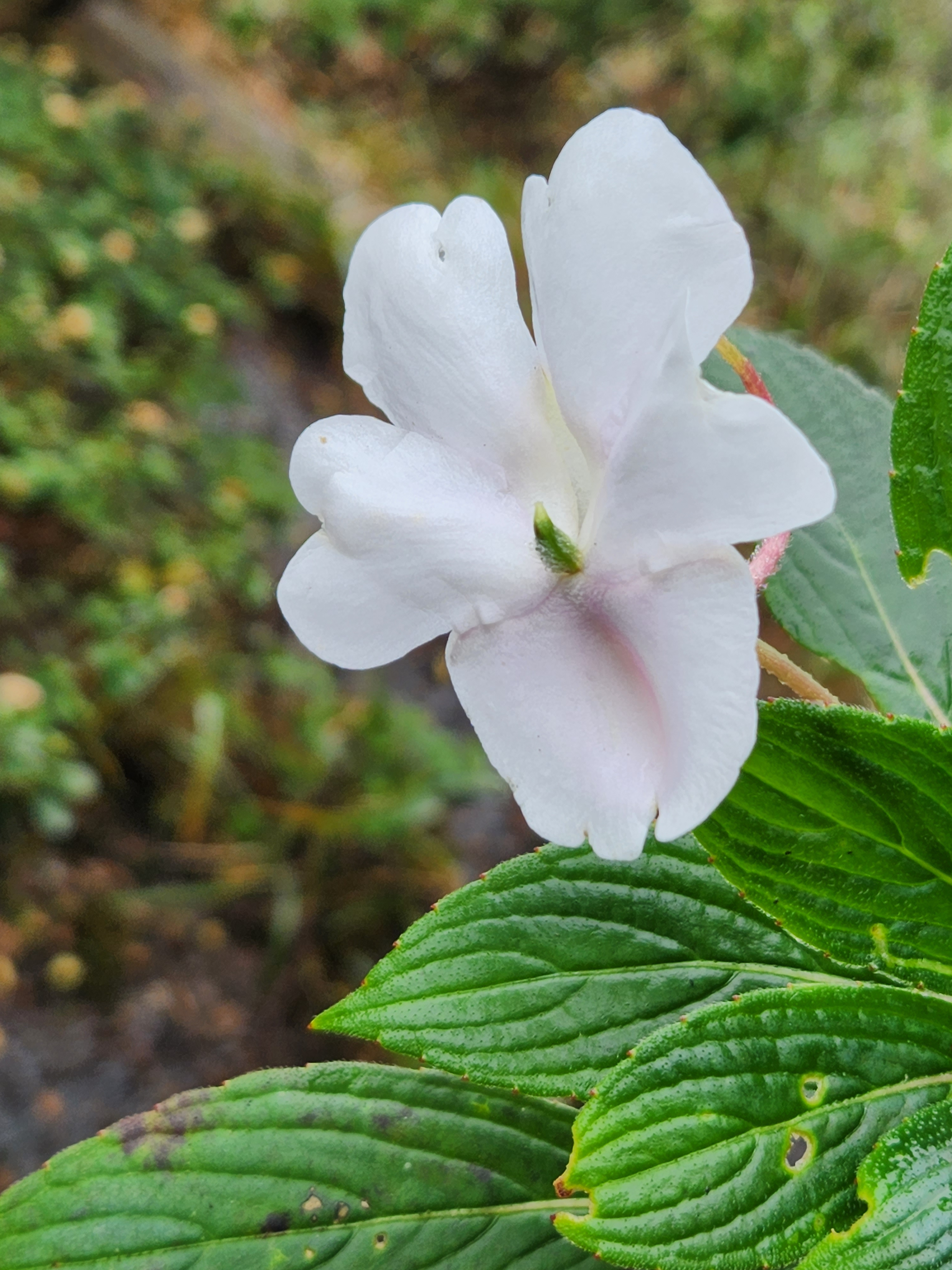

Scientific classification
- Kingdom: Plantae
- Clade: Tracheophytes
- Clade: Angiosperms
- Clade: Eudicots
- Clade: Asterids
- Order: Ericales
- Family: Balsaminaceae
- Genus: Impatiens
- Species: I. henslowiana

Binomial name
- Impatiens henslowiana Arn.

= Impatiens henslowiana =

Species of plant

Impatiens henslowiana is a flowering plant of the Balsaminaceae family, native to the Indian states of Kerala and Tamil Nadu as well Sri Lanka. It is a large shrub that grows either terrestrially or epiphytically.

== Description ==
Impatiens henslowiana is a woody shrub, also known as Henslow's balsam, that grows to 1.5 m (4.9 ft). Its stems can be either erect or procumbent (that is, prostrate or trailing). Its sawtoothed leaves can be opposite, alternate or whorled and are of a tapering ovate shape. Its inflorescences are raceme and pedicellate. Its flowers are bisexual, with zygomorphic symmetry. They usually have three sepals, though they occasionally have five, with the posterior sepal being large, and bag or boat shaped. The five free petals, which alternate with the stamens, can range in color from red to scarlet to purple or be greenish or white. The upper petal is flat, keeled or hooded, with either smooth or crested edges, and is usually lobed at the base. The flowers have multiple oblong ovaries that produce flat oval-shaped nuts. The indehiscent fruit is often asymmetrical and swollen in the middle.

== Gallery ==
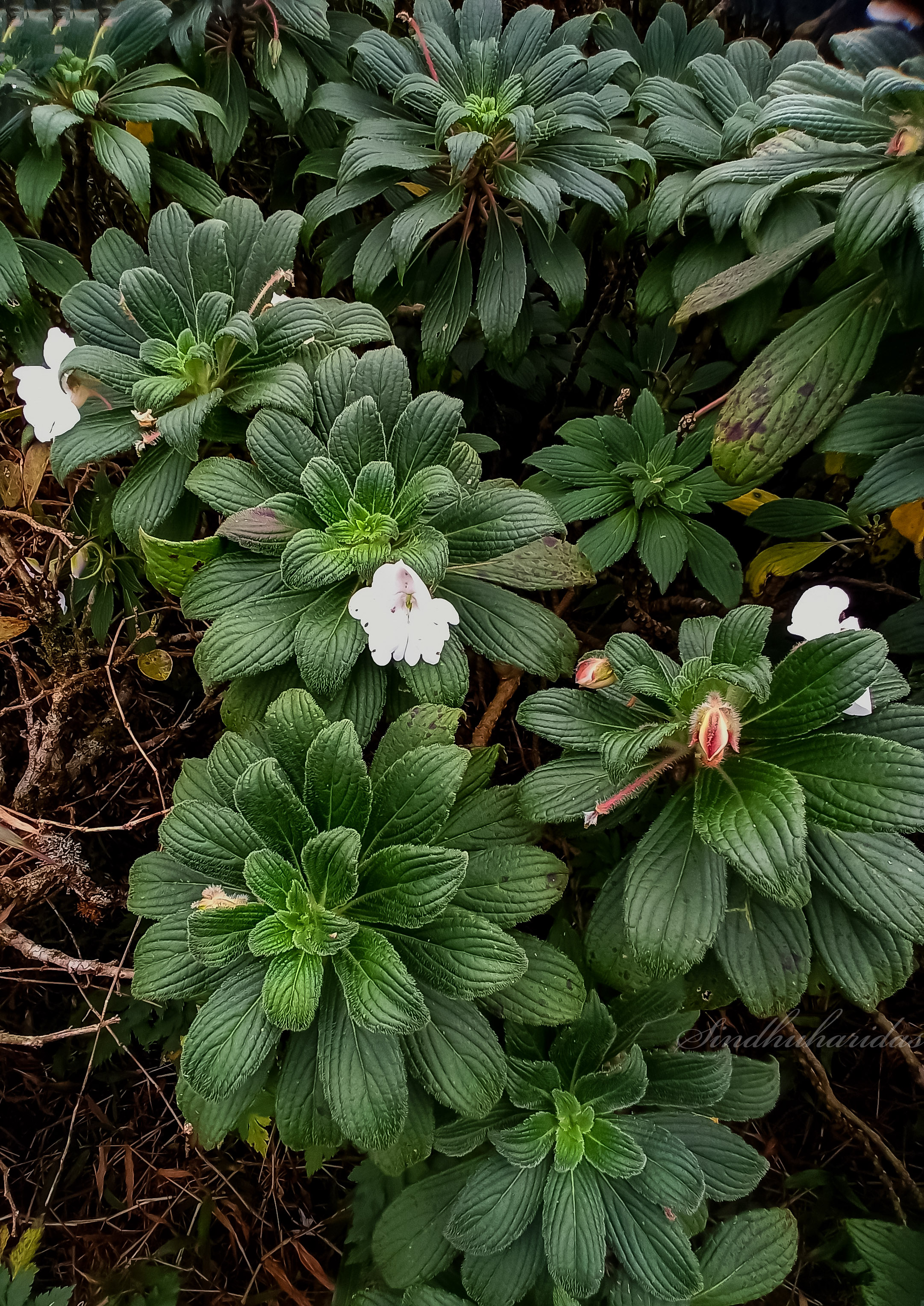

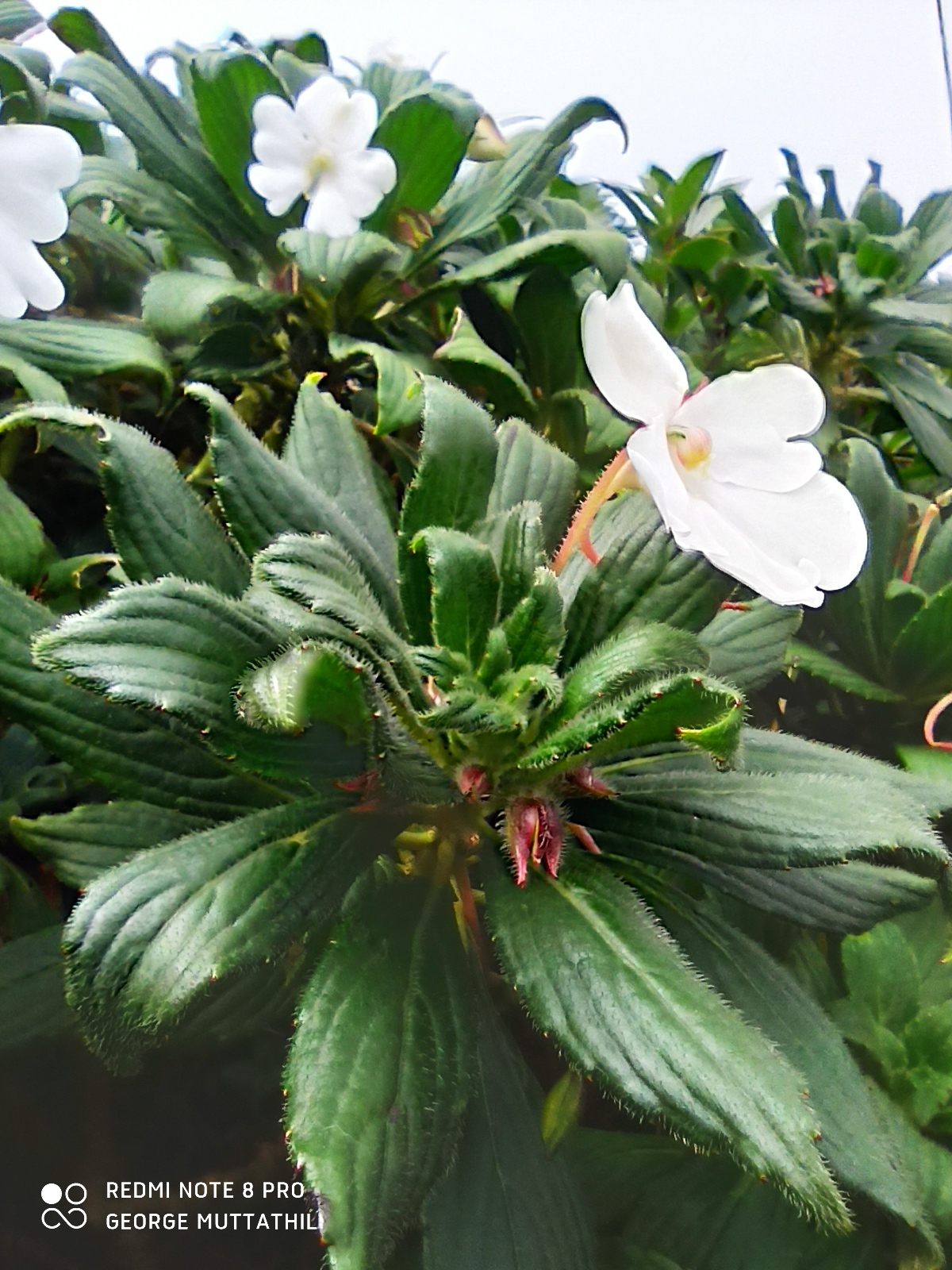

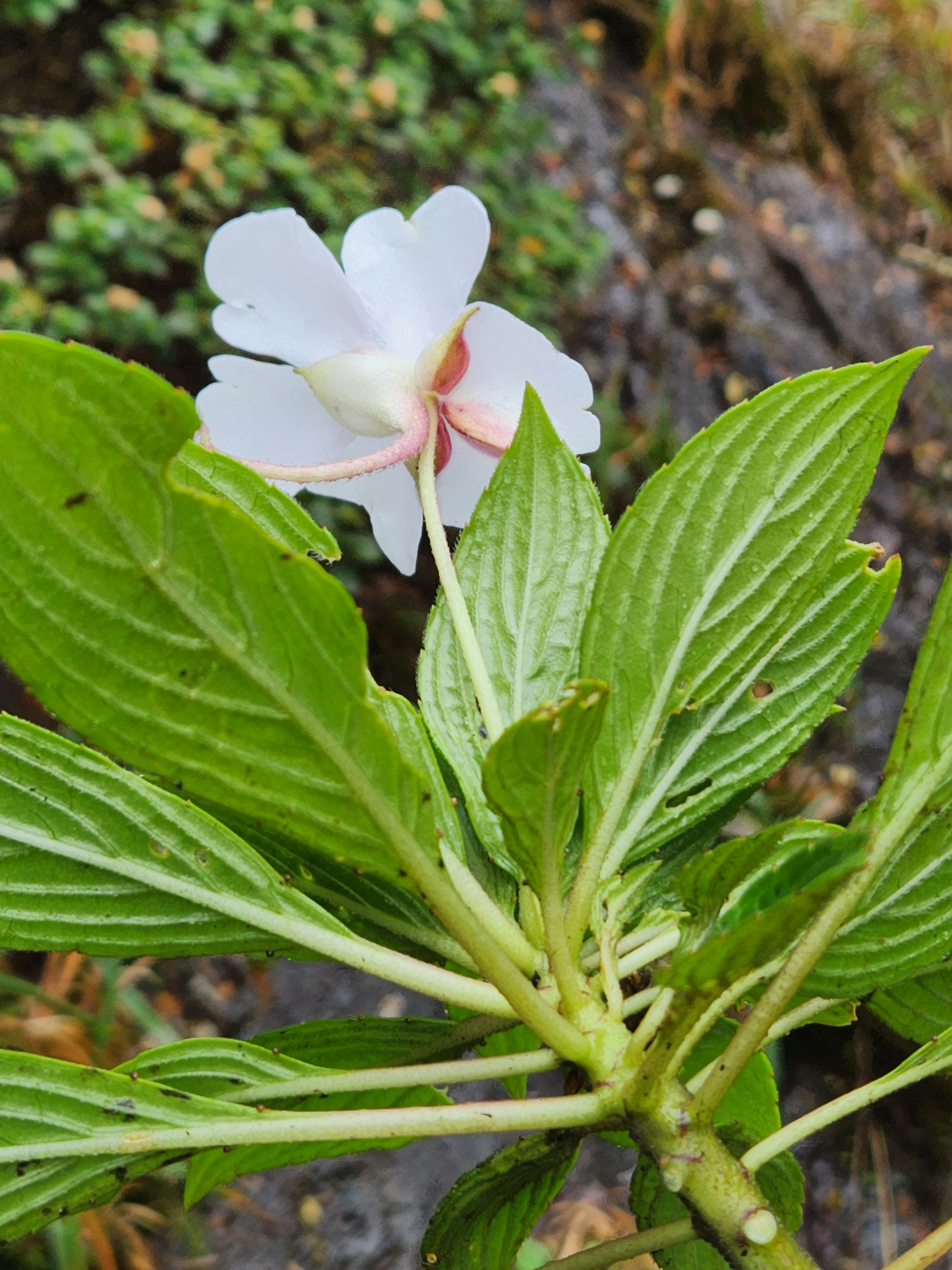

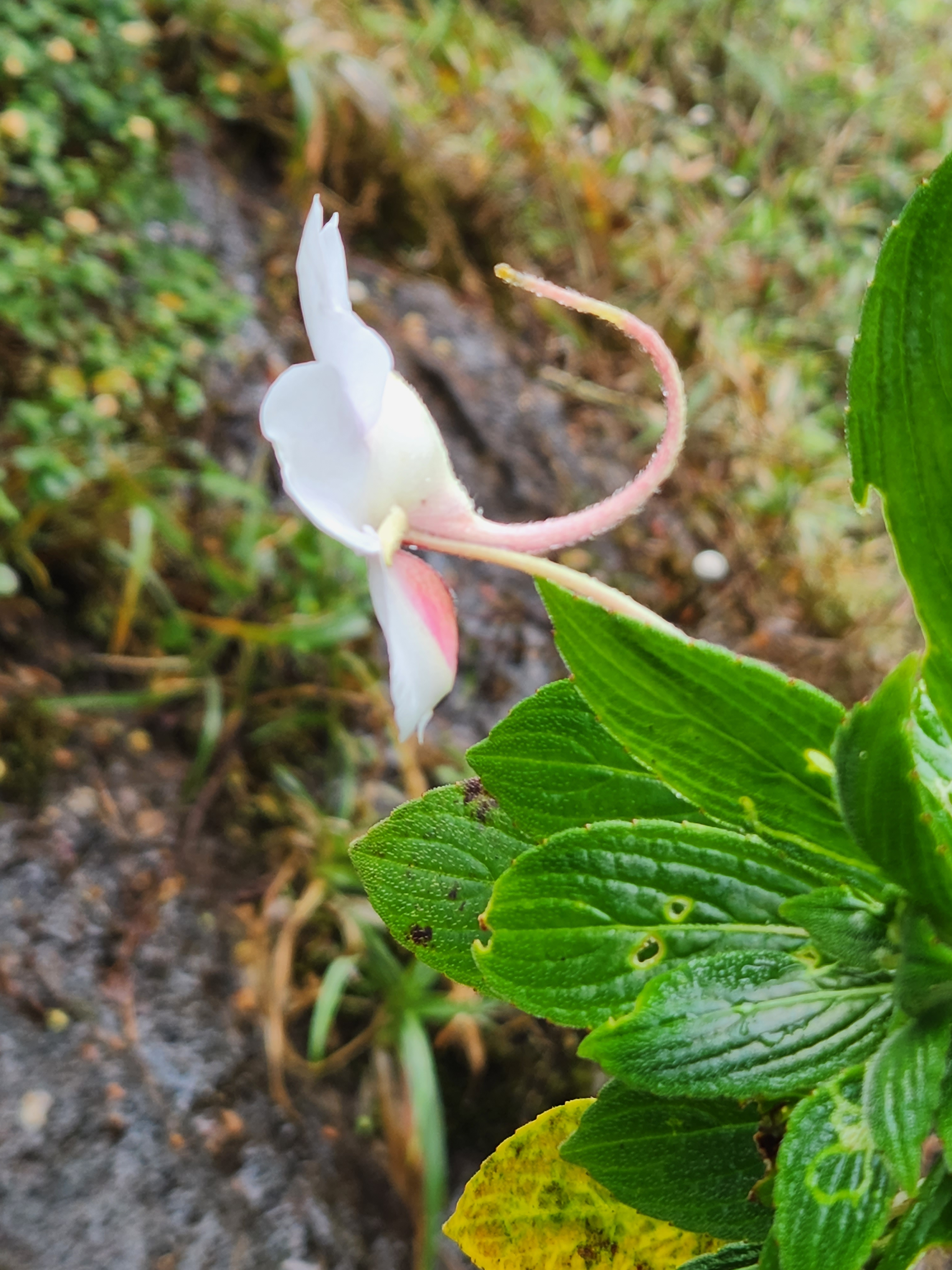
