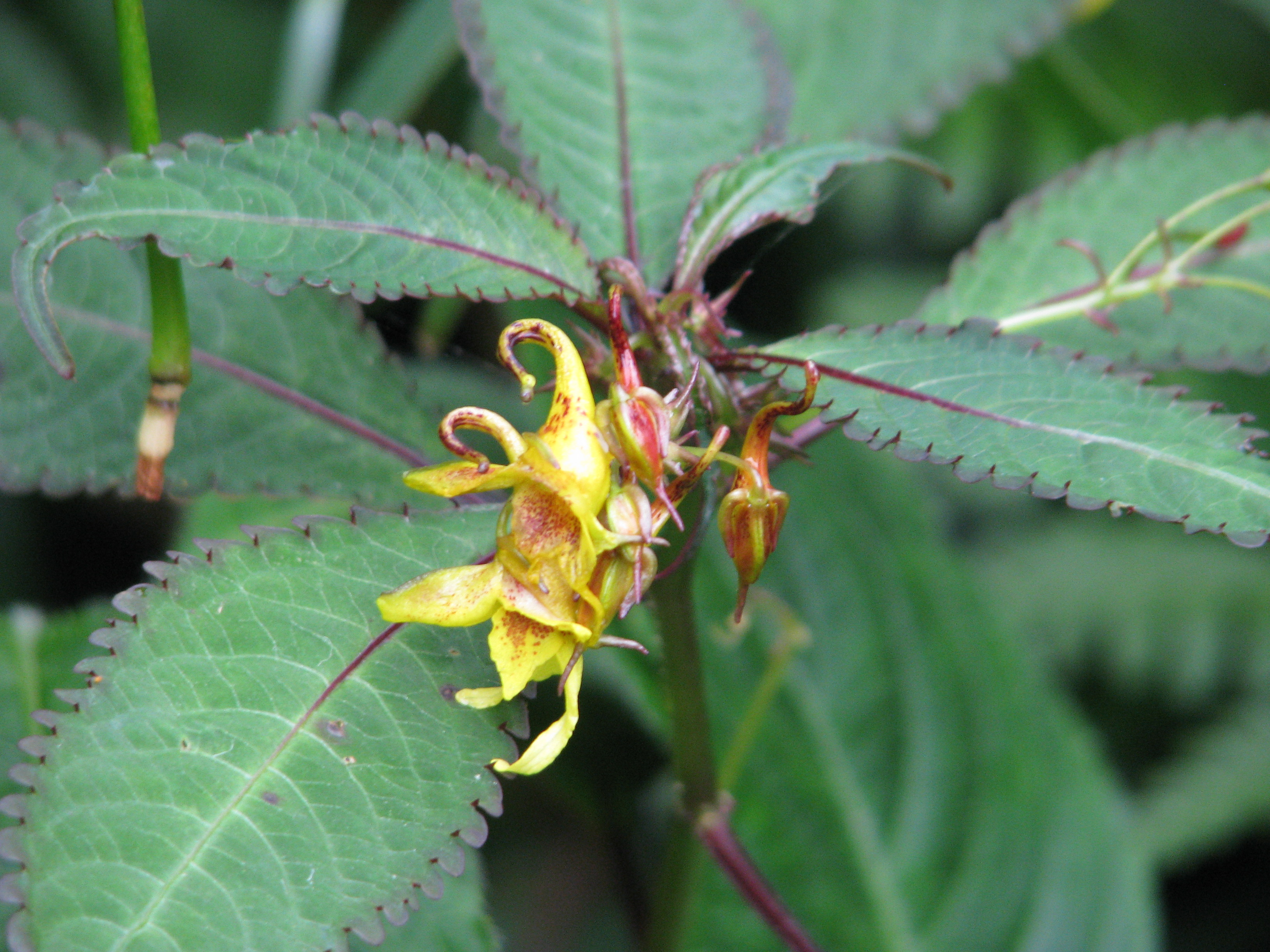
- Inflorescence
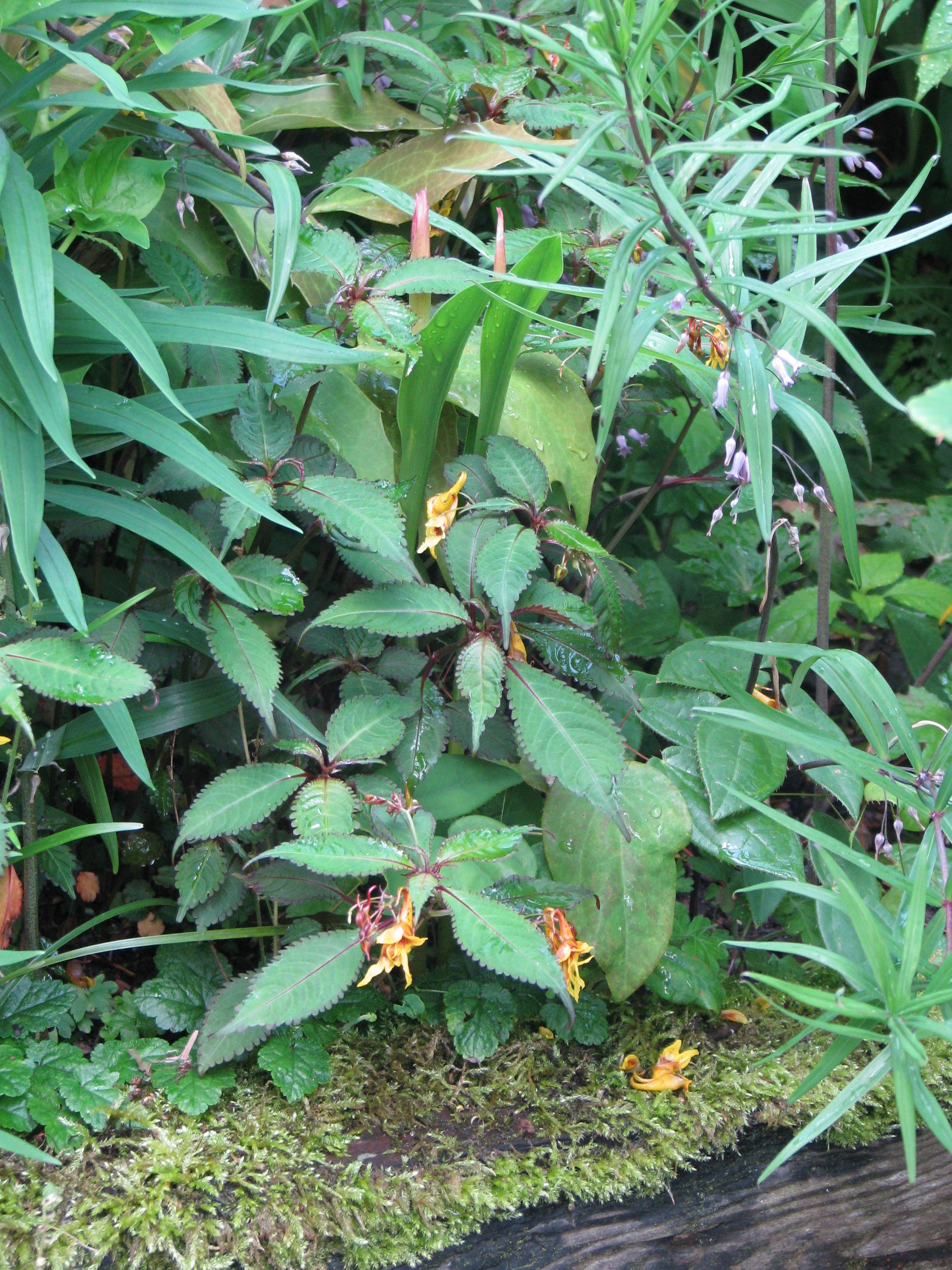
- In a garden setting

Scientific classification
- Kingdom: Plantae
- Clade: Tracheophytes
- Clade: Angiosperms
- Clade: Eudicots
- Clade: Asterids
- Order: Ericales
- Family: Balsaminaceae
- Genus: Impatiens
- Species: I. stenantha

Binomial name
- Impatiens stenantha Hook.f.

Synonyms
- Impatiens asymmetrica Hook.f.

= Impatiens stenantha =

Species of plant

Impatiens stenantha, the narrow-flowered balsam, is a species of flowering plant in the family Balsaminaceae. It is native to Tibet, northwestern Yunnan, Nepal, the eastern Himalayas, Assam, and northern Myanmar. An annual or perennial typically reaching 40 cm (16 in), it is found in the understory of mixed forests and thickets at elevations from 2,400 to 3,000 m (7,900 to 9,800 ft) above sea level. It may be conspecific with Impatiens angustiflora, which is found only in Meghalaya and was also described by Hooker in 1875. It is available from garden suppliers.
