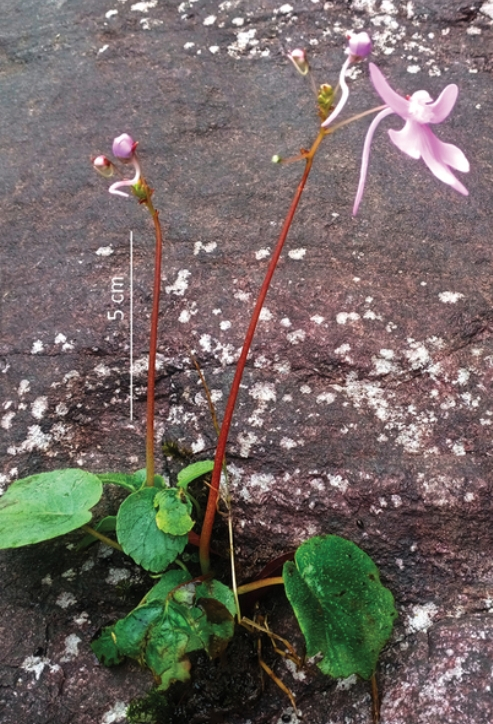

Scientific classification
- Kingdom: Plantae
- Clade: Tracheophytes
- Clade: Angiosperms
- Clade: Eudicots
- Clade: Asterids
- Order: Ericales
- Family: Balsaminaceae
- Genus: Impatiens
- Species: I. shailajae

Binomial name
- Impatiens shailajae Sindhu Arya & V.S.A.Kumar

= Impatiens shailajae =

Species of flowering plant

Impatiens shailajae is a species of flowering plant in the family Balsaminaceae. I. shailajae is a herb with violet flowers. It is native to Kerala, and was named after K. K. Shailaja, the state's former health minister.

== Distribution ==
Impatiens shailajae is native to the wet tropical biome of Kerala, India. The species grows on stone. It has been found near Fimbristylis sedges, and Impatiens verticillata.

== Taxonomy ==
Impatiens shailajae was described in 2021, alongside Impatiens achudanandanii and Impatiens danii. Within the genus Impatiens, I. shailajae is assigned to the section Tuberosae.

The type specimen was collected in Thiruvananthapuram in 2020, at an elevation of 800 metres (2,600 ft). It was found alongside cliffs associated with evergreen forests.

== Description ==
Impatiens shailajae is a herb 10–15 centimetres (3.9–5.9 in) high. The stalks are leafless, and grow directly out of the root. The roots are tuberous, and the tubers measure 4–6 millimetres (0.16–0.24 in) by 2–3 millimetres (0.079–0.118 in).

Impatiens shailajae has thin, rounded leaves, which are ovate or kidney-shaped. The leaves are 6.5 centimetres (2.6 in) long, and 4.5–5.5 centimetres (1.8–2.2 in) wide. The leaf stalks are light pink, and grow up to 2.5 centimetres (0.98 in) long.

The flowers are violet in colour, and have a straight, white spur. Each flower measures approximately 1.5 centimetres (0.59 in) across. The flowers have 1–1.5 centimetres (0.39–0.59 in) long stalks.

The plant produces dry, reddish-green fruits, which lack hairs. The fruits are ellipsoid, and measure 1.3–1.8 centimetres (0.51–0.71 in) long. Each fruit has five to eight seeds, each around 1 millimetre (0.039 in) long. The seeds are green, and have long bands of spiral hairs.

Impatiens shailajae is similar to Impatiens minae and Impatiens scapiflora.

== Etymology ==
The species is named for K. K. Shailaja, the former health minister of Kerala.
