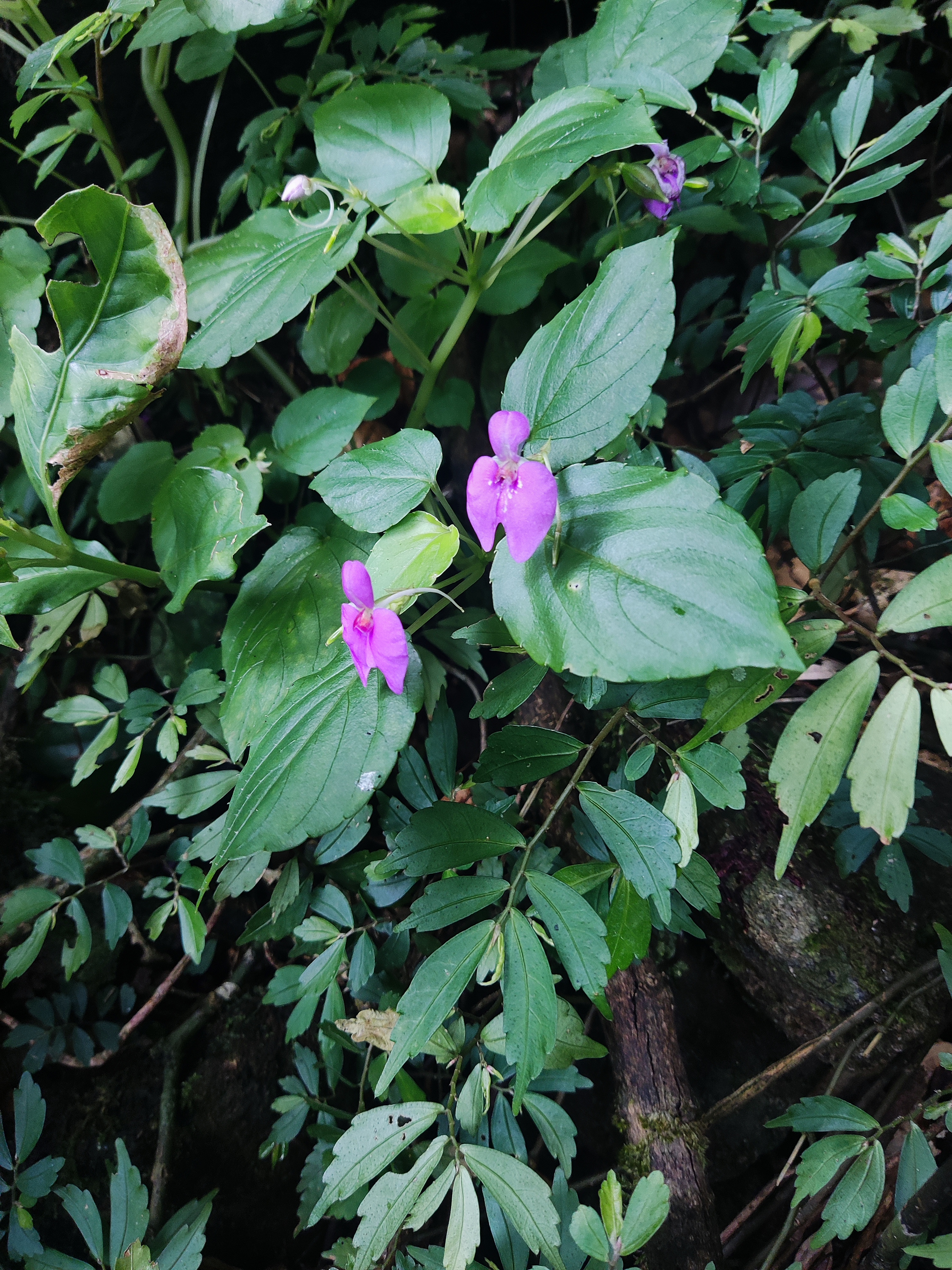

Scientific classification
- Kingdom: Plantae
- Clade: Tracheophytes
- Clade: Angiosperms
- Clade: Eudicots
- Clade: Asterids
- Order: Ericales
- Family: Balsaminaceae
- Genus: Impatiens
- Species: I. cordata

Binomial name
- Impatiens cordata Wight

= Impatiens cordata =

Species of plant

Impatiens cordata is balsam endemic to the southern Western Ghats of India. Like others in the genus, they are annual herbs growing under a foot tall with the stems prostrate. The leaves are alternate and have an ovate to cordate shape. The upper surface of the leaf is glossy and has a distinct petiole.The flowers are single or in pairs in shades of lilac with a darker purple centre. The lower sepals are funnel shaped and the spurs curve inwards.
