= Shergaon =

Gram Panchayat in West Kameng, Arunachal Pradesh, India

- Sub-division
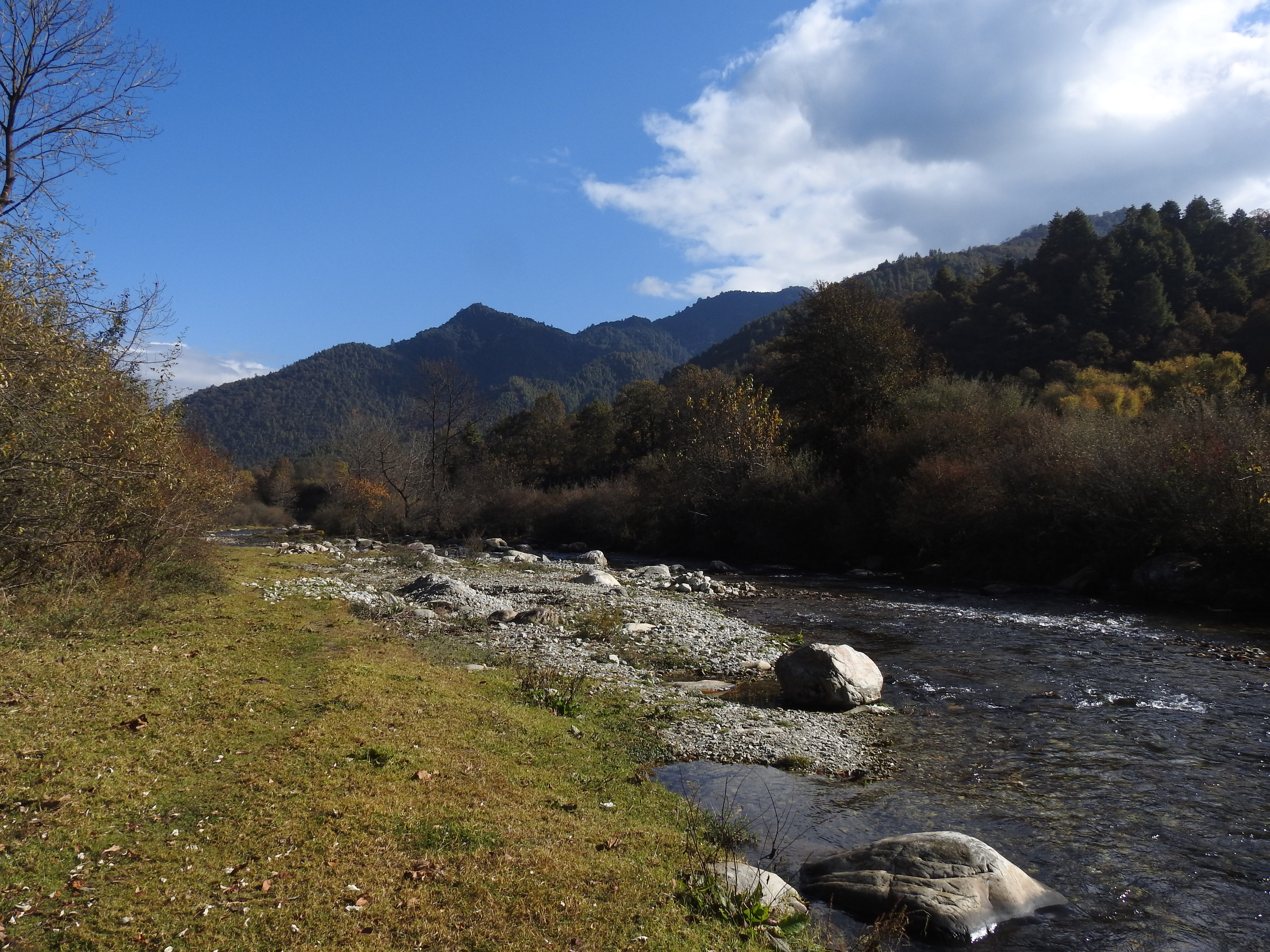
- Shergoan

- Location in Arunachal Pradesh, India Shergaon (India)
- Coordinates: 27.1236°N 92.2552°E
- Country: India
- State: Arunachal Pradesh
- District: West Kameng

Area
  - Total: 371.90 km^{2} (143.59 sq mi)
- Elevation: 2,336 m (7,664 ft)

Population (2011)
  - Total: 3,077
- Time zone: UTC+5:30 (IST)
- PIN: 790003
- Vehicle registration: AR-04

Shergaon is a Gram Panchayat and Sub-division in West Kameng district, Arunachal Pradesh, India. A total of 7 villages comes under Shergaon Gram Panchayat; including Demachang, Jigaon, Mushaksing, Rowta, Shergaon, Tenzingaon, Yokmupam. As per 2011 Census of India, Shergaon sub-division has a population of 3,077 people including 1,628 males and 1,449 females.

Shergaon is a high altitude area. The major population of the area is from Sherdukpen tribe.
