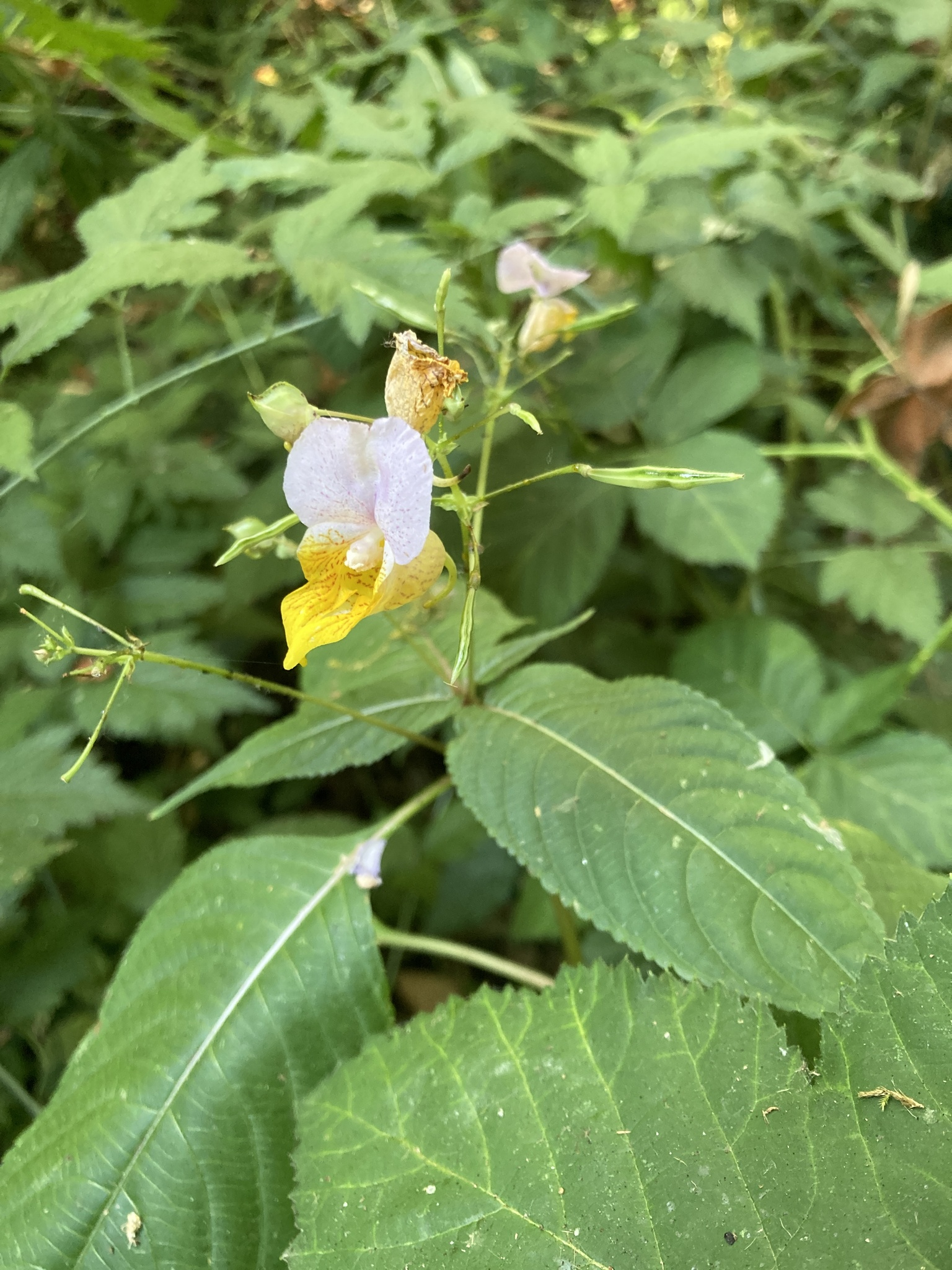

Scientific classification
- Kingdom: Plantae
- Clade: Tracheophytes
- Clade: Angiosperms
- Clade: Eudicots
- Clade: Asterids
- Order: Ericales
- Family: Balsaminaceae
- Genus: Impatiens
- Species: I. bicolor

Binomial name
- Impatiens bicolor Royle

= Impatiens bicolor =

Species of flowering plant

Impatiens bicolor, also known as the bicolored balsam, is a species of flowering plant within the family Balsaminaceae.

== Description ==
Impatiens bicolor is an annual plant reaching heights ranging between 26 and 75 cm (10 and 30 in) tall. This species possesses bicolored flowers, which can vary in color. Flowers are 25 to 30 mm (0.98 to 1.18 in) long, borne on peduncles 35–95 mm (1.4–3.7 in) long with pedicels about 15 to 20 mm (0.59 to 0.79 in) (extending to 25 mm (0.98 in) when in fruit). The leaves are elliptic to elliptic-ovate with crenate-dentate margins and petioles up to 30 mm (1.2 in) long bearing two basal glands.

== Distribution ==
Impatiens bicolor is native to parts of Southern Asia where it naturally occurs in the countries of Afghanistan, Nepal and Pakistan, also extending into the Western Himalayas mountain range. The species has also been introduced outside of their native range with wild populations occurring in Germany and Oregon.

== Habitat ==
Impatiens bicolor can be found growing on mountain slopes at altitudes ranging from 1,600 to 2,500 metres (5,250 to 8,200 ft) above sea level within the Himalayas. Plants introduced into Oregon can be found growing along the banks of streams within forests, but also within moist soils in ravines and on slopes.
