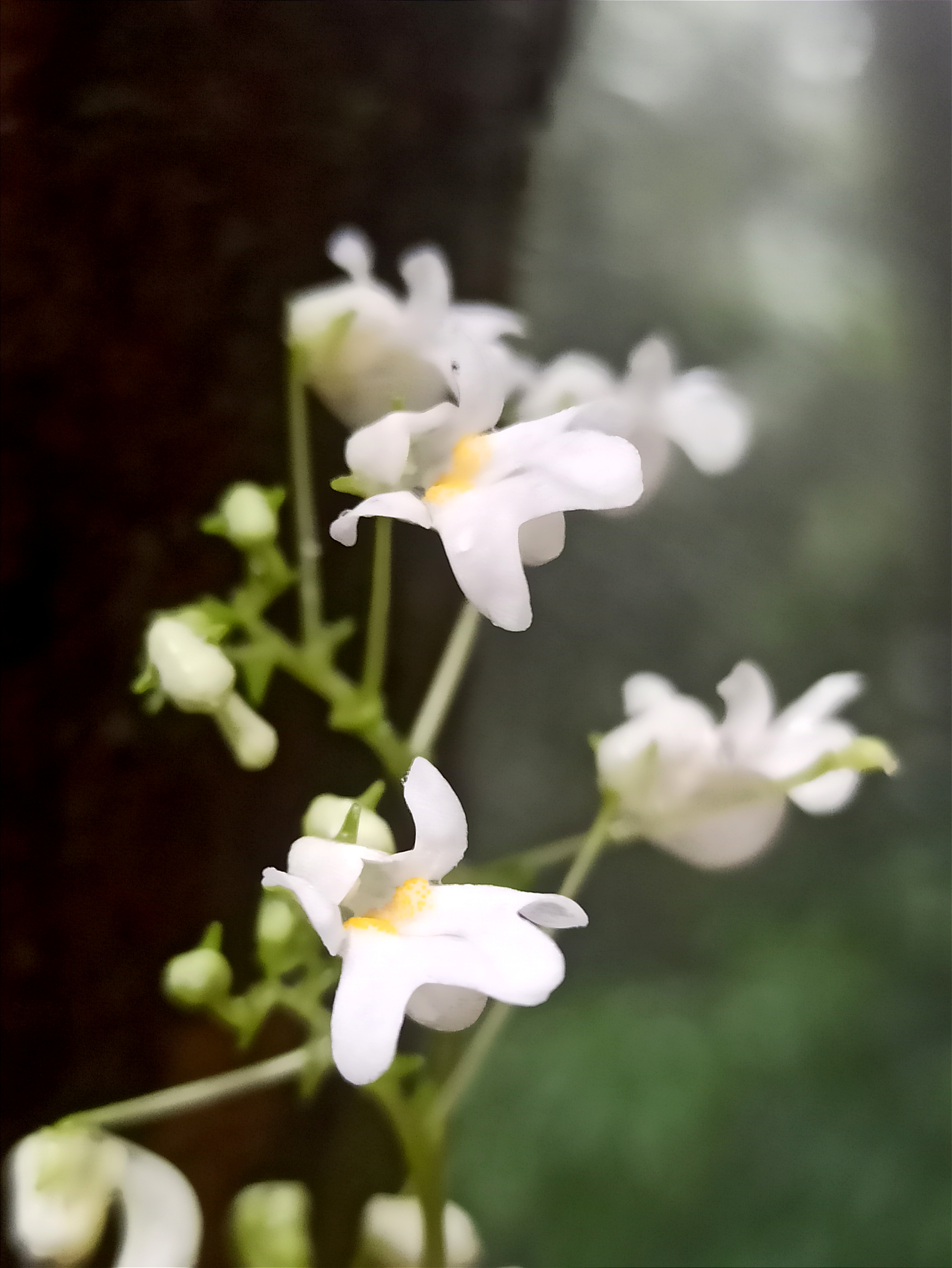

Scientific classification
- Kingdom: Plantae
- Clade: Tracheophytes
- Clade: Angiosperms
- Clade: Eudicots
- Clade: Asterids
- Order: Ericales
- Family: Balsaminaceae
- Genus: Impatiens
- Species: I. dendricola

Binomial name
- Impatiens dendricola C.E.C.Fisch.

= Impatiens dendricola =

Species of plant

Impatiens dendricola is a herbaceous flowering plant in the family Balsaminaceae endemic to Western Ghats.

== Description ==
It is an epiphytic, scapigerous, tuberous herb, growing up to 10 – 20 high. There are 4-5 radical leaves per tuber. Leaves are ovate, elliptic or lanceolate, hairy above, glabrous below with distinct midrib. Glabrous petioles are 1.5 – 7 cm long. Flowers are in 5–18 cm long racemes. Each raceme has 2-10 flowers. White flowers have ovate bracts. Sickle shaped lateral sepals have deeply lobed base on anterior side. Ovate lips have sac like base. Wings are 3-lobed with a cluster of orange hairs a little above base. Distal lobes are streight, strap shaped and rounded. Median lobe - sub-circular, basal lobe - strap shaped and slightly widened at the tip. Strongly curved spur is club shaped.

== Gallery ==
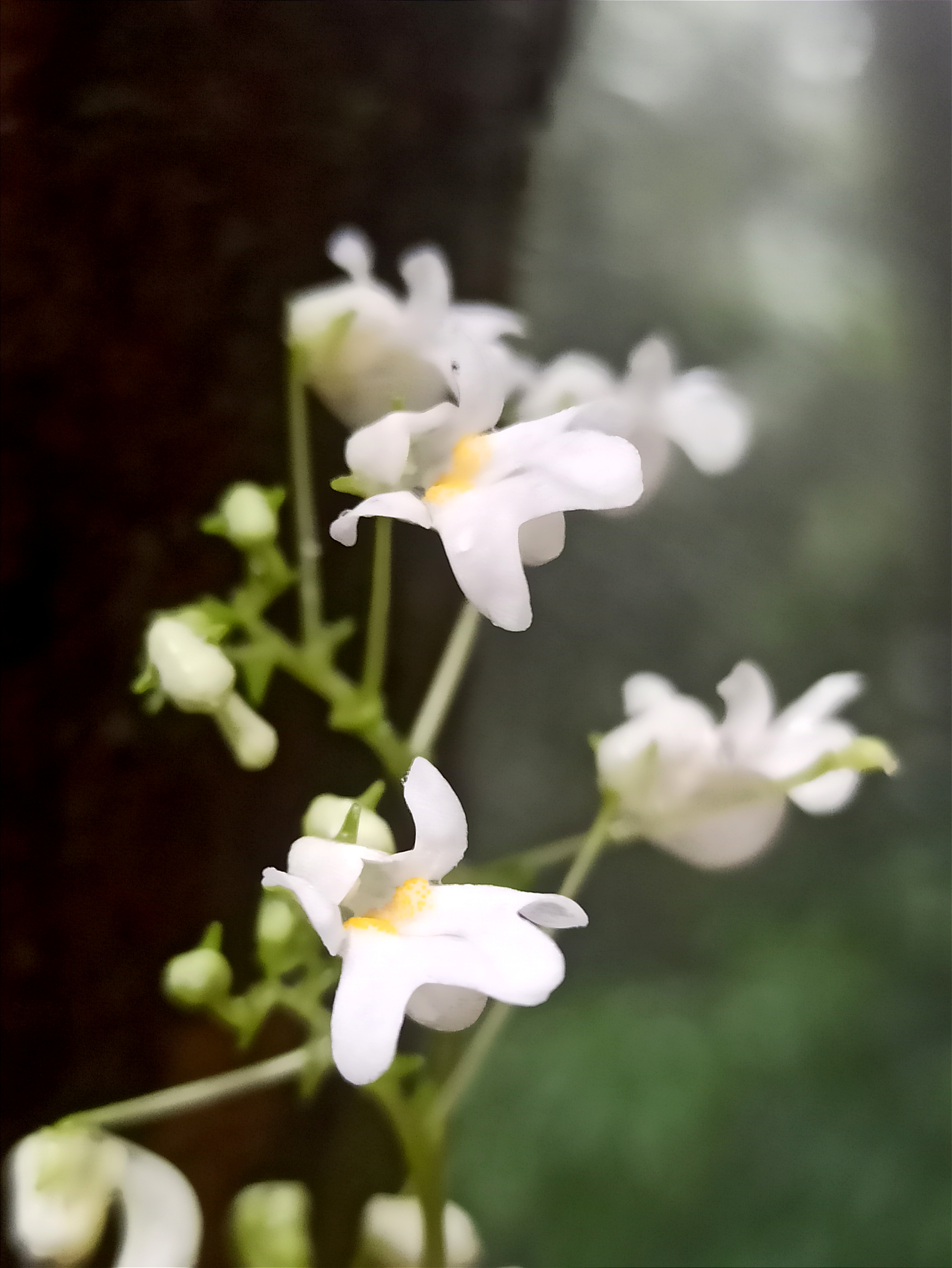

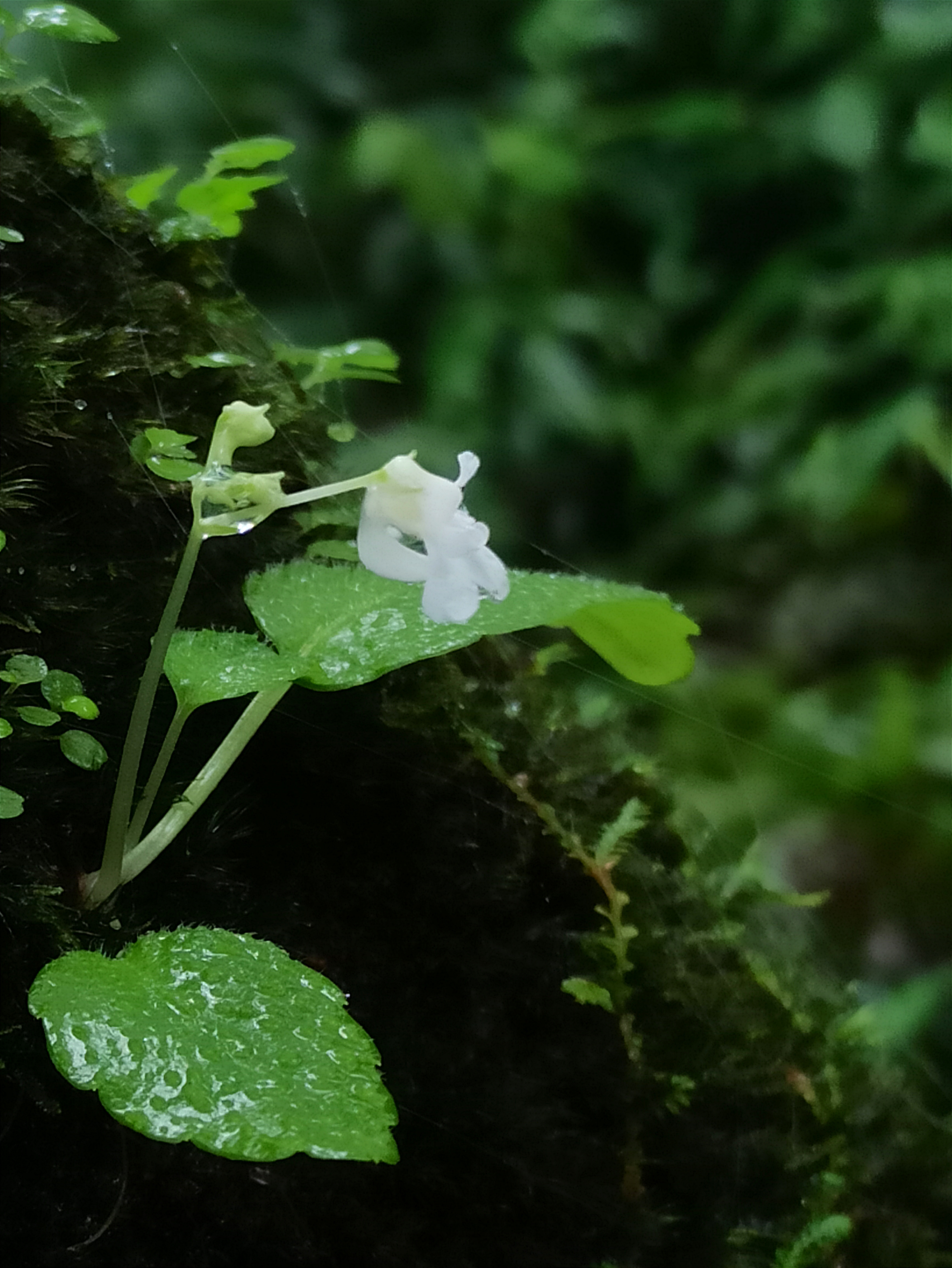

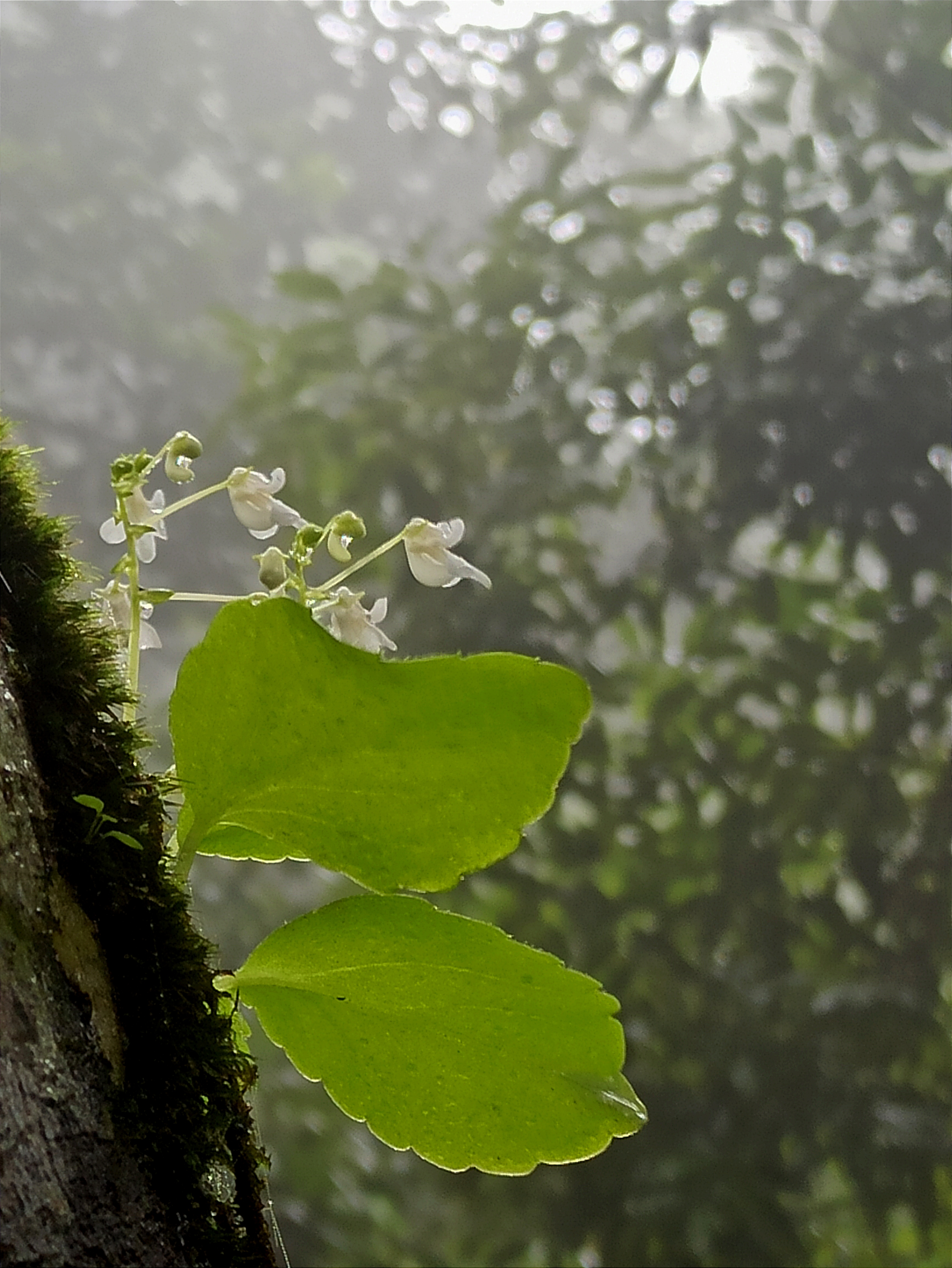

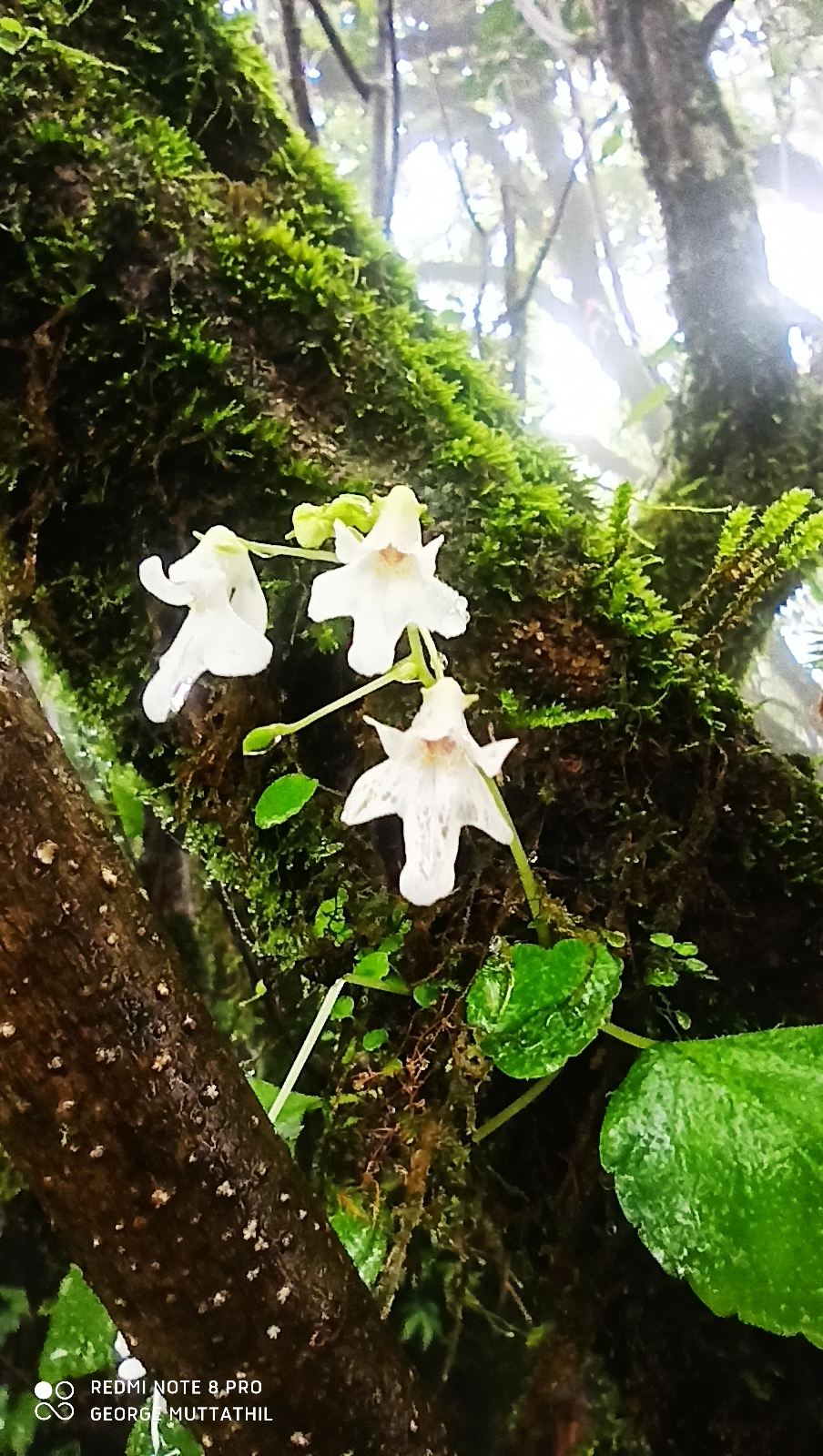
