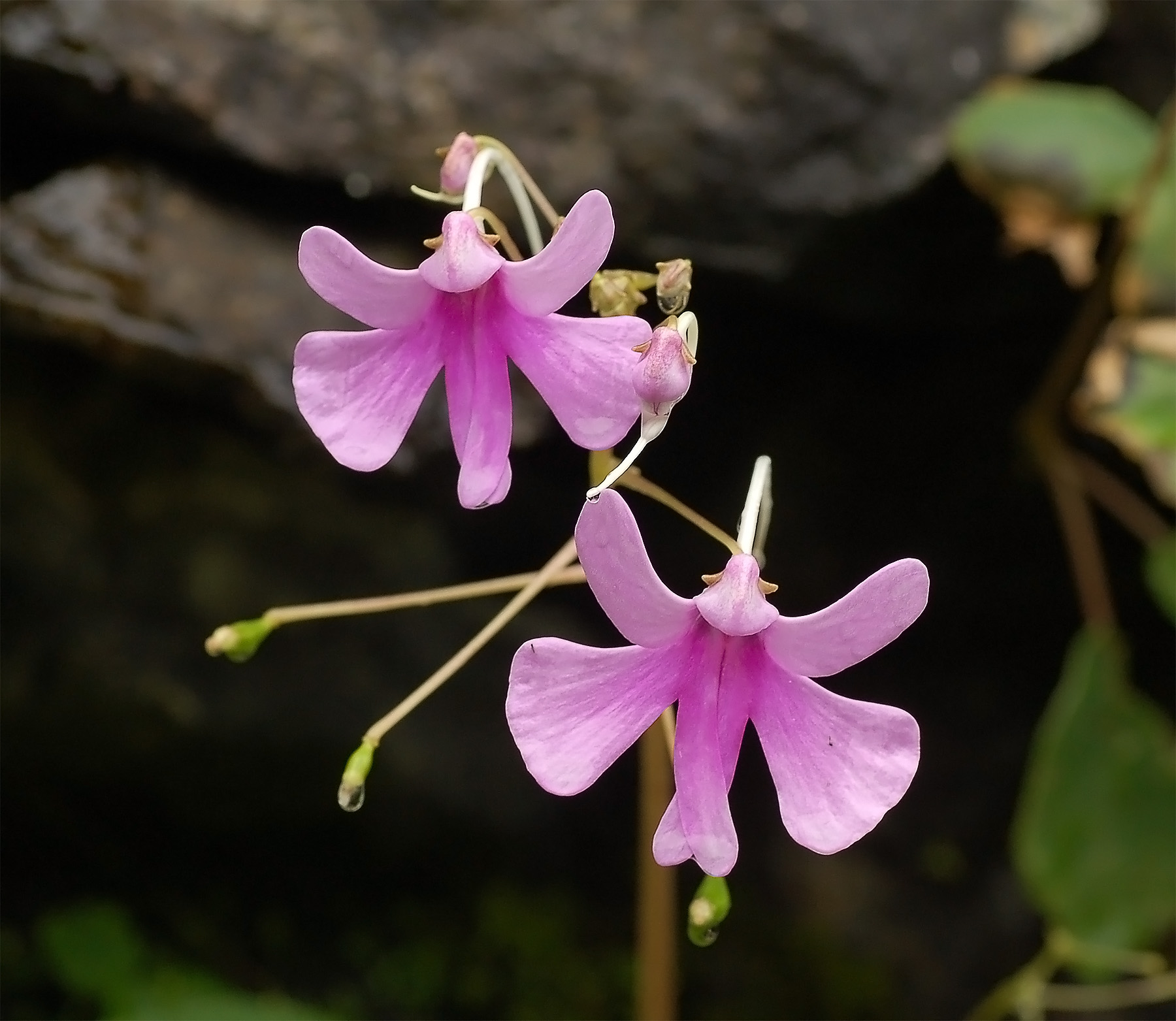
- Impatiens scapiflora at Silent Valley National Park, South India

Scientific classification
- Kingdom: Plantae
- Clade: Tracheophytes
- Clade: Angiosperms
- Clade: Eudicots
- Clade: Asterids
- Order: Ericales
- Family: Balsaminaceae
- Genus: Impatiens; L.

Species
- Over 1,000; see list of Impatiens species

Synonyms
- Balsamina Tourn. ex Scop.; Chrysaea Nieuwl. & Lunell; Impatientella H.Perrier; Petalonema Peter; Semeiocardium Zoll.; Trimorphopetalum Baker

= Impatiens =

Genus of flowering plants

Impatiens /ɪmˈpeɪʃəns/ is a genus of more than 1,000 species of flowering plants, widely distributed throughout the Northern Hemisphere and the tropics. Together with the genus Hydrocera (one species), Impatiens make up the family Balsaminaceae.

Common names in North America include impatiens, jewelweed, touch-me-not, snapweed and patience. As a rule-of-thumb, "jewelweed" is used exclusively for Nearctic species, and balsam is usually applied to tropical species. In the British Isles by far the most common names are impatiens and busy lizzie, especially for the many varieties, hybrids and cultivars involving Impatiens walleriana. "Busy lizzie" is also found in the American literature. Impatiens glandulifera is commonly called policeman's helmet in the UK, where it is an introduced species.

== Description ==
Himalayan balsam (I. glandulifera) scattering its seeds

Most Impatiens species are herbaceous annuals or perennials with succulent stems. Only a few woody species exist. Plant size varies, from five centimeters to 2.5 meters, depending on the species. Stems often form roots when they come into contact with the soil. The leaves are entire, often dentate or sinuate with extrafloral nectaries. Depending on the species, leaves can be thin to succulent. Particularly on the underside of the leaves, tiny air bubbles are trapped over and under the leaf surface, giving them a silvery sheen that becomes pronounced when they are held underwater.

The zygomorphic flowers of Impatiens are protandric (male becoming female with age). The calyx consists of five free sepals, of which one pair is often strongly reduced. The non-paired sepal forms a flower spur-producing nectar. In a group of species from Madagascar, the spur is completely lacking, but they still have three sepals. The crown consists of five petals, of which the lateral pairs are fused. The five stamens are fused and form a cap over the ovary, which falls off after the male phase. After the stamens have fallen off, the female phase starts and the stigma becomes receptive, which reduces self-pollination.

The scientific name Impatiens (Latin for "impatient") and the common name "touch-me-not" refer to the explosive dehiscence of the seed capsules. The mature capsules burst, sending seeds up to several meters away.

== Distribution ==
The genus Impatiens occurs in Africa, Eurasia and North America. Two species (Impatiens turrialbana and Impatiens mexicana) occur in isolated areas in Central America (southern Mexico and Costa Rica). Most Impatiens species occur in the tropical and subtropical mountain forests in Africa, Madagascar, the Himalayas, the Western Ghats (southwest India) and southeast Asia. In Europe only a single Impatiens species (Impatiens noli-tangere) occurs naturally. However, several neophytic species exist.

In the 19th and 20th centuries, humans transported the North American orange jewelweed (I. capensis) to England, France, the Netherlands, Poland, Sweden, Finland, and potentially other areas of Northern and Central Europe. For example, it was not recorded from Germany as recently as 1996, but since then a population has naturalized in Hagen at the Ennepe River. The orange jewelweed is quite similar to the touch-me-not balsam (I. noli-tangere), the only Impatiens species native to Central and Northern Europe, and it utilizes similar habitats, but no evidence exists of natural hybrids between them. Small balsam (I. parviflora), originally native to southern Central Asia, is even more extensively naturalized in Europe. More problematic is the Himalayan balsam (I. glandulifera), a densely growing species which displaces smaller plants by denying them sunlight. It is an invasive weed in many places, and tends to dominate riparian vegetation along polluted rivers and nitrogen-rich spots. Thus, it exacerbates ecosystem degradation by forming stands where few other plants can grow, and by rendering riverbanks more prone to erosion, as it has only a shallow root system.

== Ecology ==
Most Impatiens species are perennial herbs. However, several annual species exist, especially in the temperate regions as well as in the Himalayas. A few Impatiens species in southeast Asia (e.g. Impatiens kerriae or Impatiens mirabilis) form shrubs or small trees up to three meters tall. Most Impatiens species occur in forests, especially along streams and paths or at the forest edge with a little bit of sunlight. Additionally, a few species occur in open landscapes, such as heathland, river banks or savanna.

The genus Impatiens is characterized by a large variety of flower architectures. Traditionally two flower types are differentiated: one with a sacculate spur and a more or less two-lipped flower and a second with a filiform spur and a flat flower surface. However, several transition forms exist. Additionally, a group of 125 spur-less species exist on Madagascar, forming a third main flower type. Due to the large variability in flower architecture it seems reasonable to group the species by their main pollinators: such as bees and bumblebees, butterflies, moths, flies, and sunbirds. Further, a few cleistogamous species exist. However, most species are dependent on pollinator activity for efficient seed production but many of them are self-compatible. Most temperate species as well as some tropical species can switch from chasmogamous (pollinator-dependent) to cleistogamous (seed production within closed flowers) flowers when nutrient and light conditions become adverse.

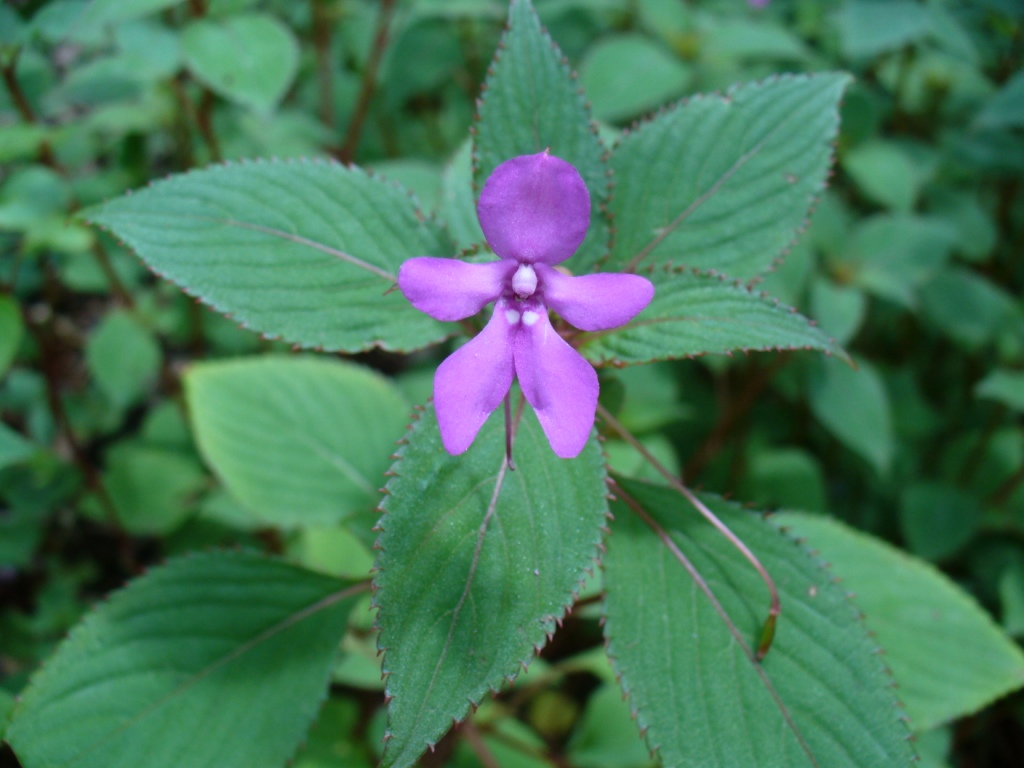
Impatiens zombensis

Impatiens foliage is used for food by the larvae of some Lepidoptera species, such as the dot moth (Melanchra persicariae), as well as other insects, such as the Japanese beetle (Popillia japonica). The leaves are toxic to many other animals, including the budgerigar (Melopsittacus undulatus), but the bird will readily eat the flowers. The flowers are also visited by bumblebees and certain Lepidoptera, such as the common spotted flat (Celaenorrhinus leucocera).

Parasitic plants that use impatiens as hosts include the European dodder (Cuscuta europaea). A number of plant diseases affect this genus.

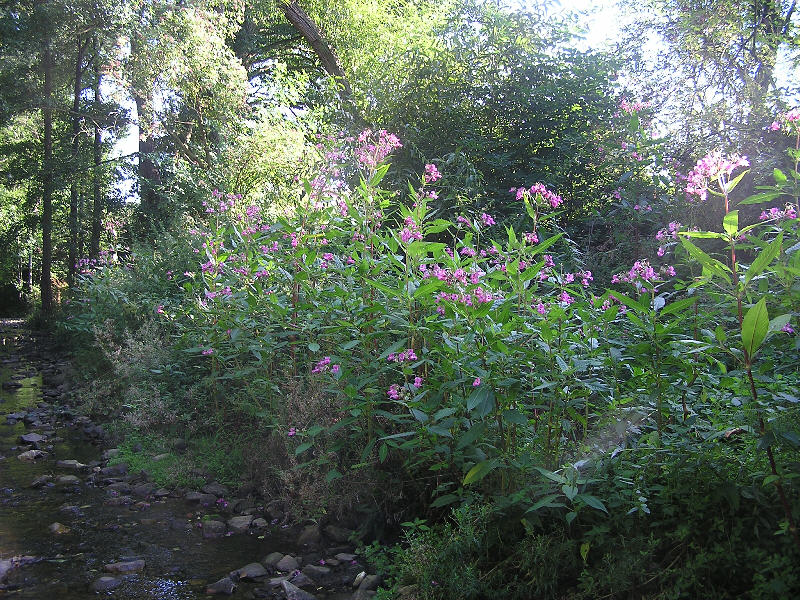
Himalayan balsam (I. glandulifera) invading habitat along a creek in Hesse

The starkly differing flower shapes found in this genus, combined with the easy cultivation of many species, have served to make some balsam species model organisms in plant evolutionary developmental biology. Also, Impatiens is rather closely related to the carnivorous plant families Roridulaceae and Sarraceniaceae. Peculiar stalked glands found on balsam sepals secrete mucus and might be related to the structures from which the prey-catching and -digesting glands of these carnivorous plants evolved. Balsams are not known to be protocarnivorous plants, however.

In 2011–2013, the United States experienced a significant outbreak of the fungal disease downy mildew that affects impatiens, particularly Impatiens walleriana. The disease was also reported in Canada as well. The pathogen plasmopara obducens is the chief culprit suspected by scientists, but Bremiella sphaerosperma is related. These pathogens were first reported in the United States in 2004.

== Medicinal uses and phytochemistry ==
Impatiens contain 2-methoxy-1,4-naphthoquinone, an anti-inflammatory and fungicide naphthoquinone that is an active ingredient in some formulations of Preparation H.

North American impatiens have been used as herbal remedies for the treatment of bee stings, insect bites, and stinging nettle (Urtica dioica) rashes. They are also used after poison ivy (Toxicodendron radicans) contact to prevent a rash from developing. The efficacy of orange jewelweed (I. capensis) and yellow jewelweed (I. pallida) in preventing poison ivy contact dermatitis has been studied, with conflicting results. A study in 1958 found that Impatiens biflora was an effective alternative to standard treatment for dermatitis caused by contact with sumac, while later studies found that the species had no antipruritic effects after the rash has developed. Researchers reviewing these contradictions state that potential reason for these conflicts include the method of preparation and timing of application. A 2012 study found that while an extract of orange jewelweed and garden jewelweed (I. balsamina) was not effective in reducing contact dermatitis, a mash of the plants applied topically decreased it.

Impatiens glandulifera is one of the Bach flower remedies, flower extracts used as herbal remedies for physical and emotional problems. It is included in the "Rescue Remedy" or "Five Flower Remedy", a potion touted as a treatment for acute anxiety and which is supposed to be protective in stressful situations. Studies have found no difference between the effect of the potion and that of a placebo.

All Impatiens taste bitter and seem to be slightly toxic upon ingestion, causing intestinal ailments like vomiting and diarrhea. The toxic compounds have not been identified but are probably the same as those responsible for the bitter taste, likely might be glycosides or alkaloids.

α-Parinaric acid

α-Parinaric acid, a polyunsaturated fatty acid discovered in the seeds of the makita tree (Atuna racemosa subsp. racemosa), is together with linolenic acid the predominant component of the seed fat of garden jewelweed (I. balsamina), and perhaps other species of Impatiens. This is interesting from a phylogenetic perspective, because the makita tree is a member of the Chrysobalanaceae in a lineage of eudicots entirely distinct from the balsams.

Certain jewelweeds, including the garden jewelweed contain the naphthoquinone lawsone, a dye that is also found in henna (Lawsonia inermis) and is also the hair coloring and skin coloring agent in mehndi. In ancient China, Impatiens petals mashed with rose and orchid petals and alum were used as nail polish: leaving the mixture on the nails for some hours colored them pink or reddish.

== Cultivation ==
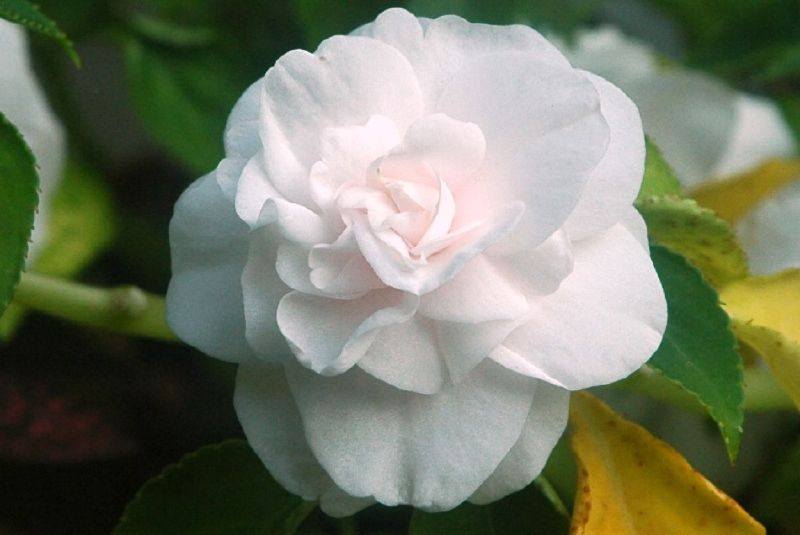
Double-flowered impatiens cultivar

Impatiens are popular garden annuals. Hybrids, typically derived from busy lizzie (I. walleriana) and New Guinea impatiens (I. hawkeri), have commercial importance as garden plants. I. walleriana is native to East Africa, and yielded 'Elfin' series of cultivars, which was subsequently improved as the 'Super Elfin' series. Double-flowered cultivars also exist.

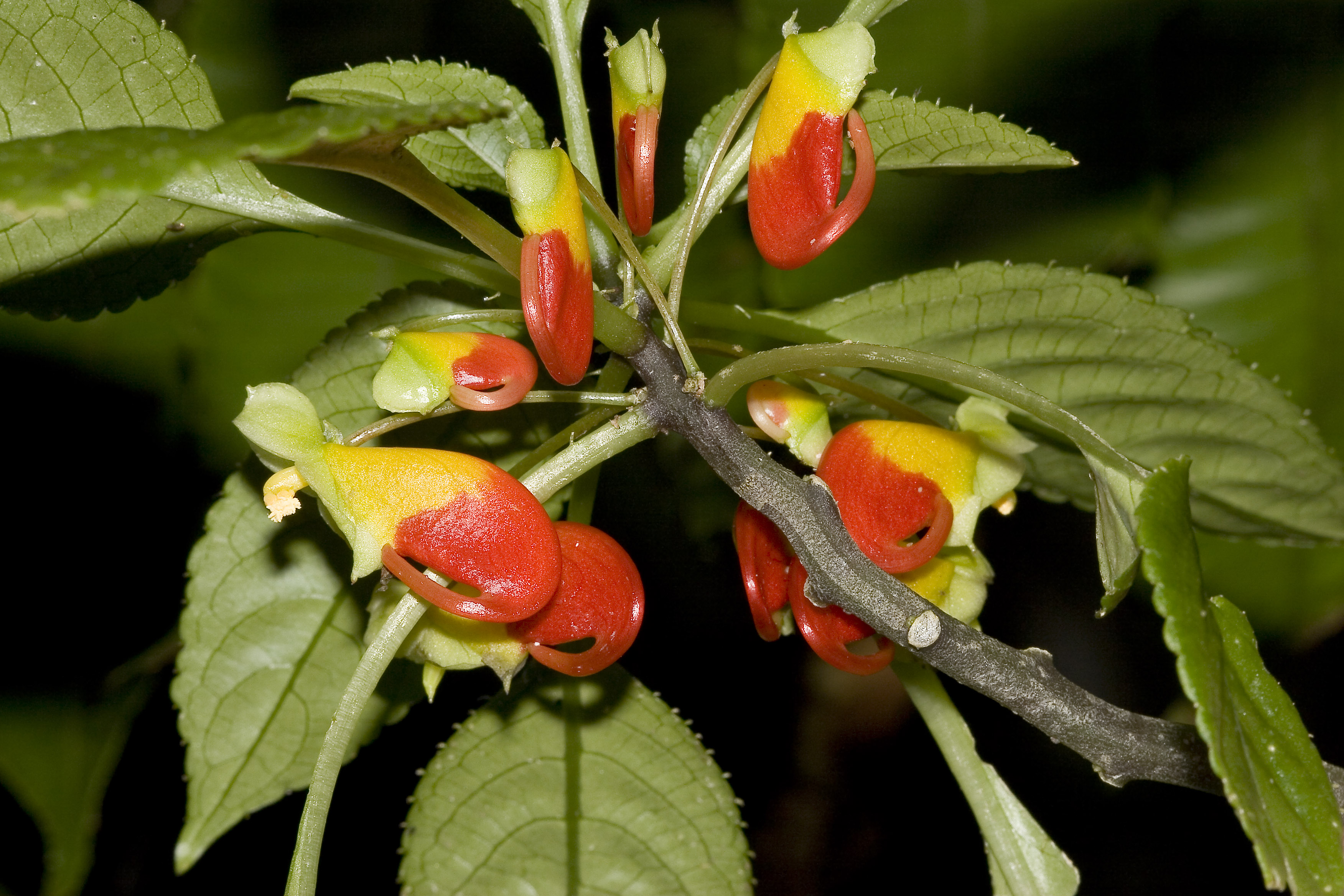
Congo cockatoo (I. niamniamensis)

Other Impatiens species, such as African queen (I. auricoma), garden jewelweed (I. balsamina), blue diamond impatiens (I. namchabarwensis), parrot flower (I. psittacina), Congo cockatoo (I. niamniamensis), Ceylon balsam (I. repens), and poor man's rhododendron (I. sodenii), are also used as ornamental plants.

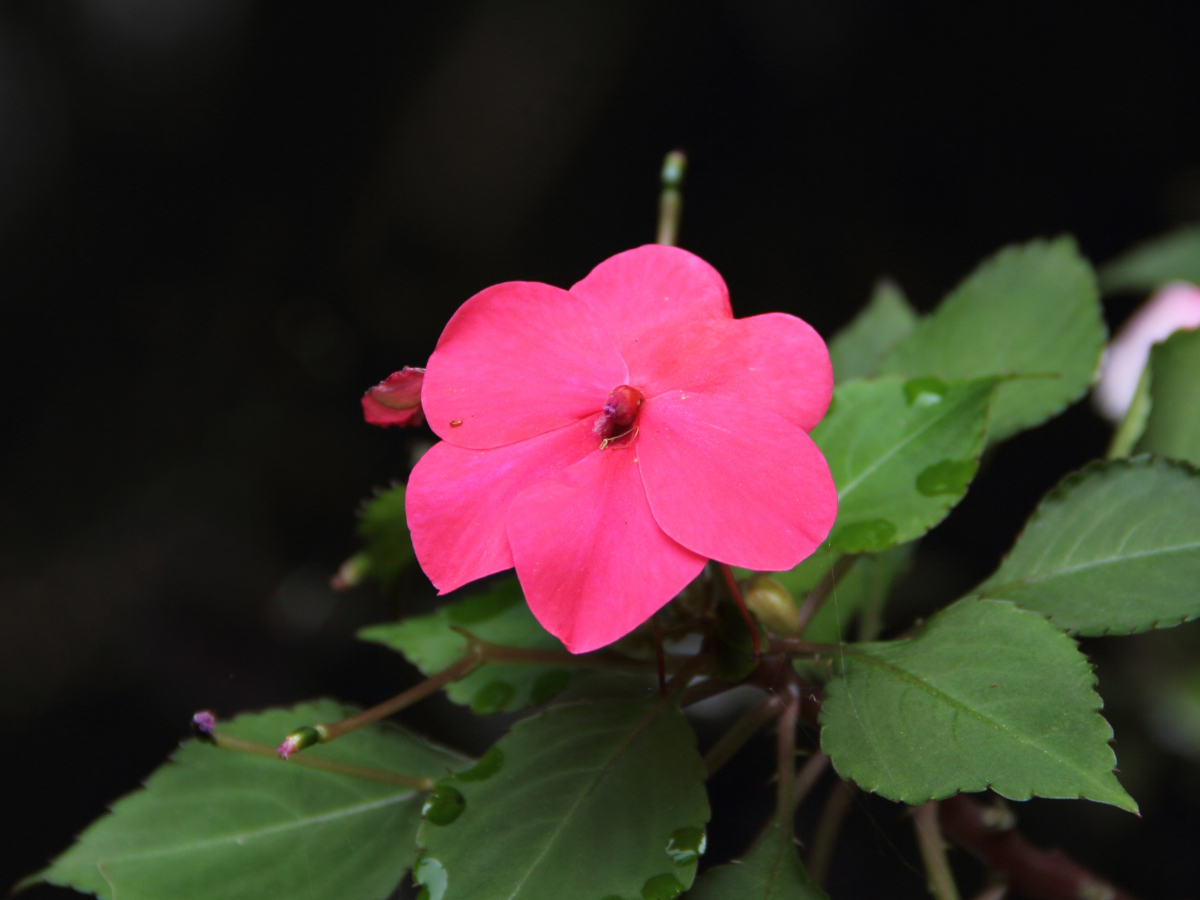
Impatiens walleriana

== Species ==
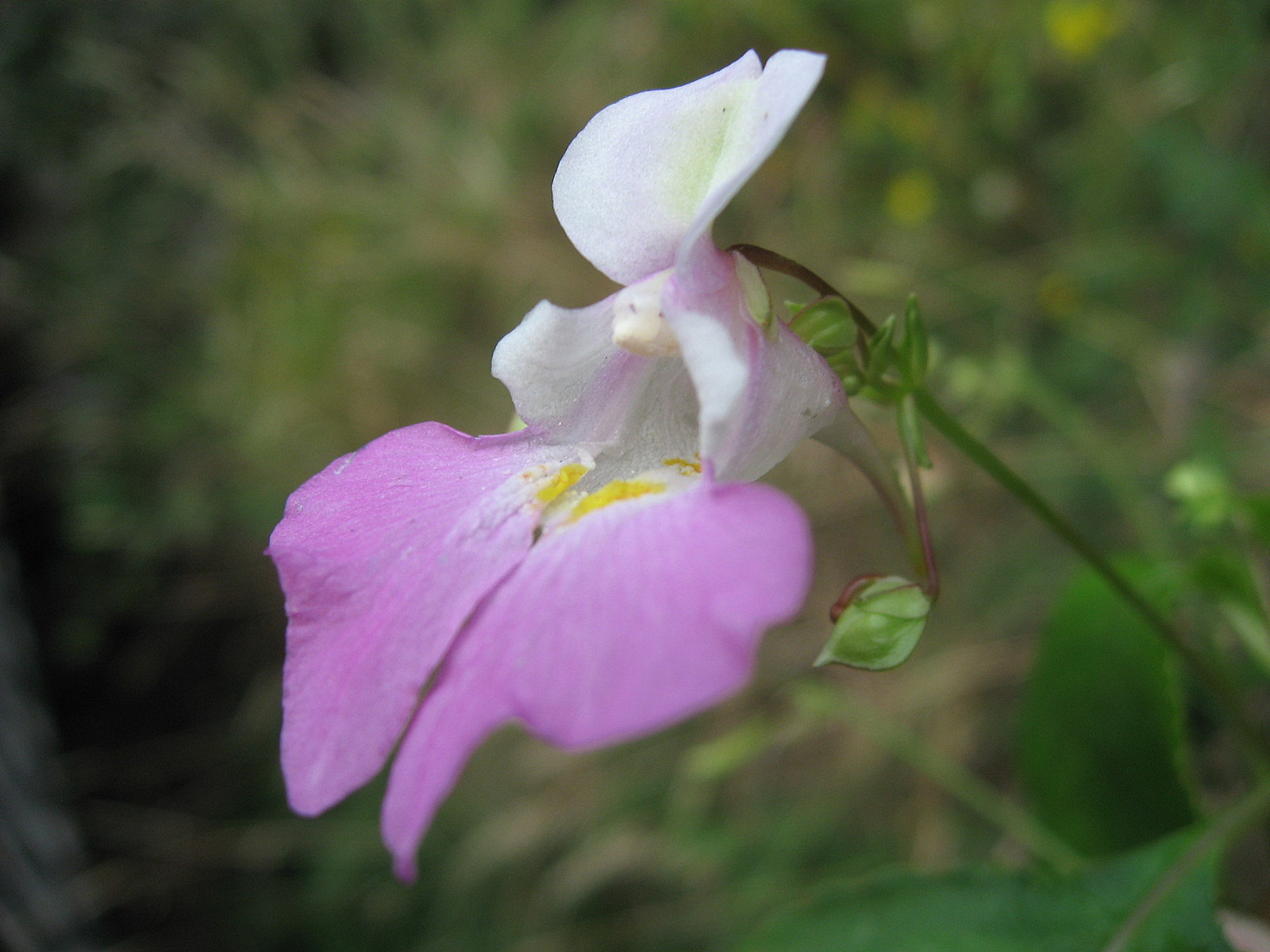
Kashmir balsam (Impatiens balfourii)

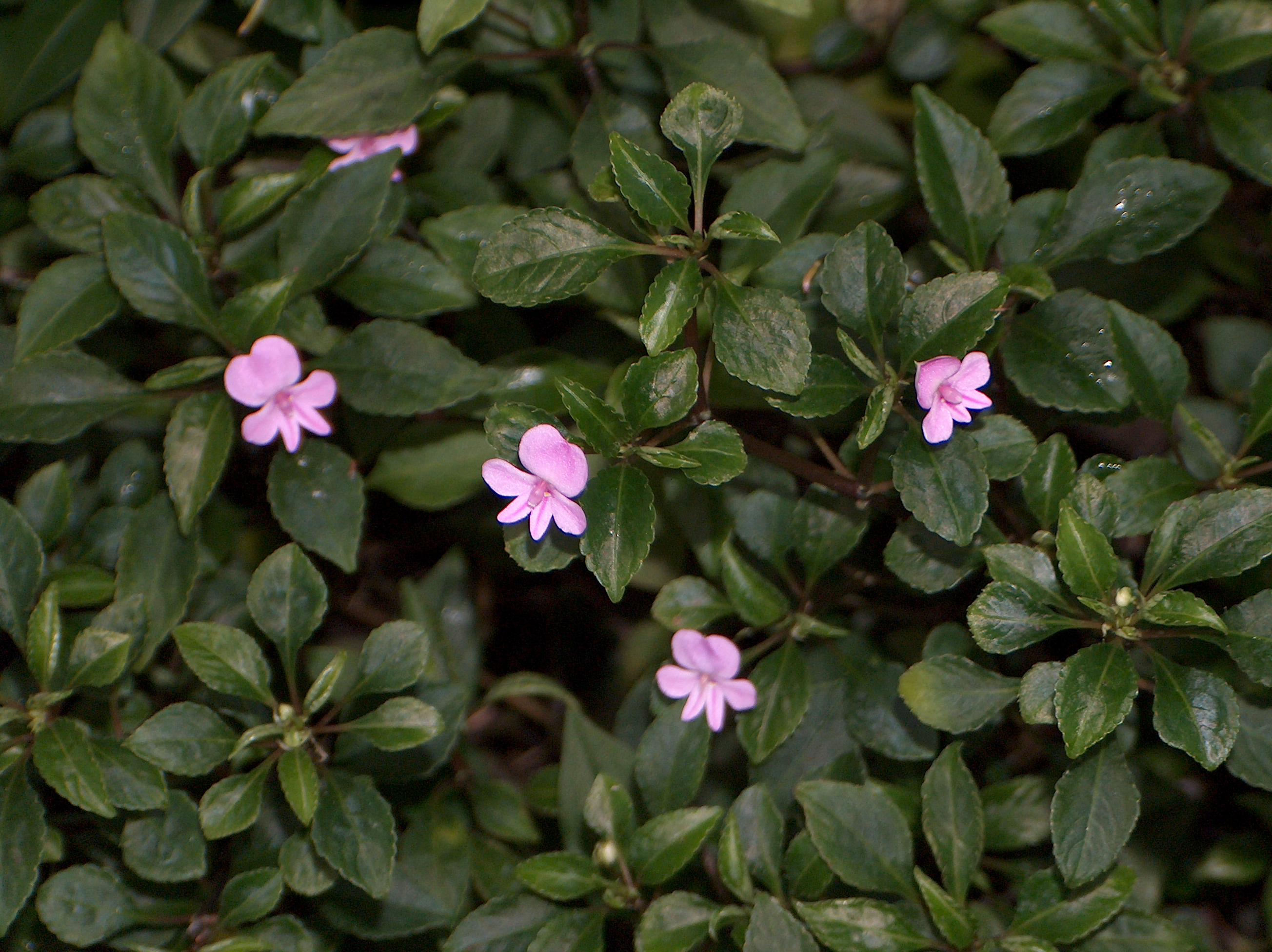
Impatiens pseudoviola

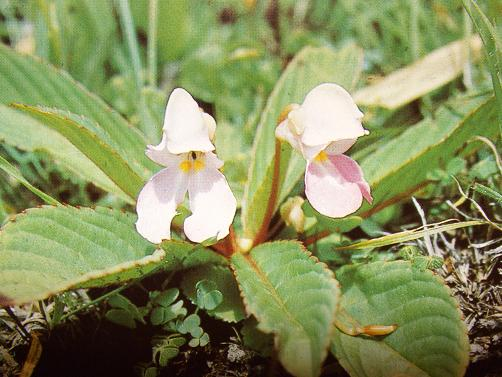
Impatiens rosulata

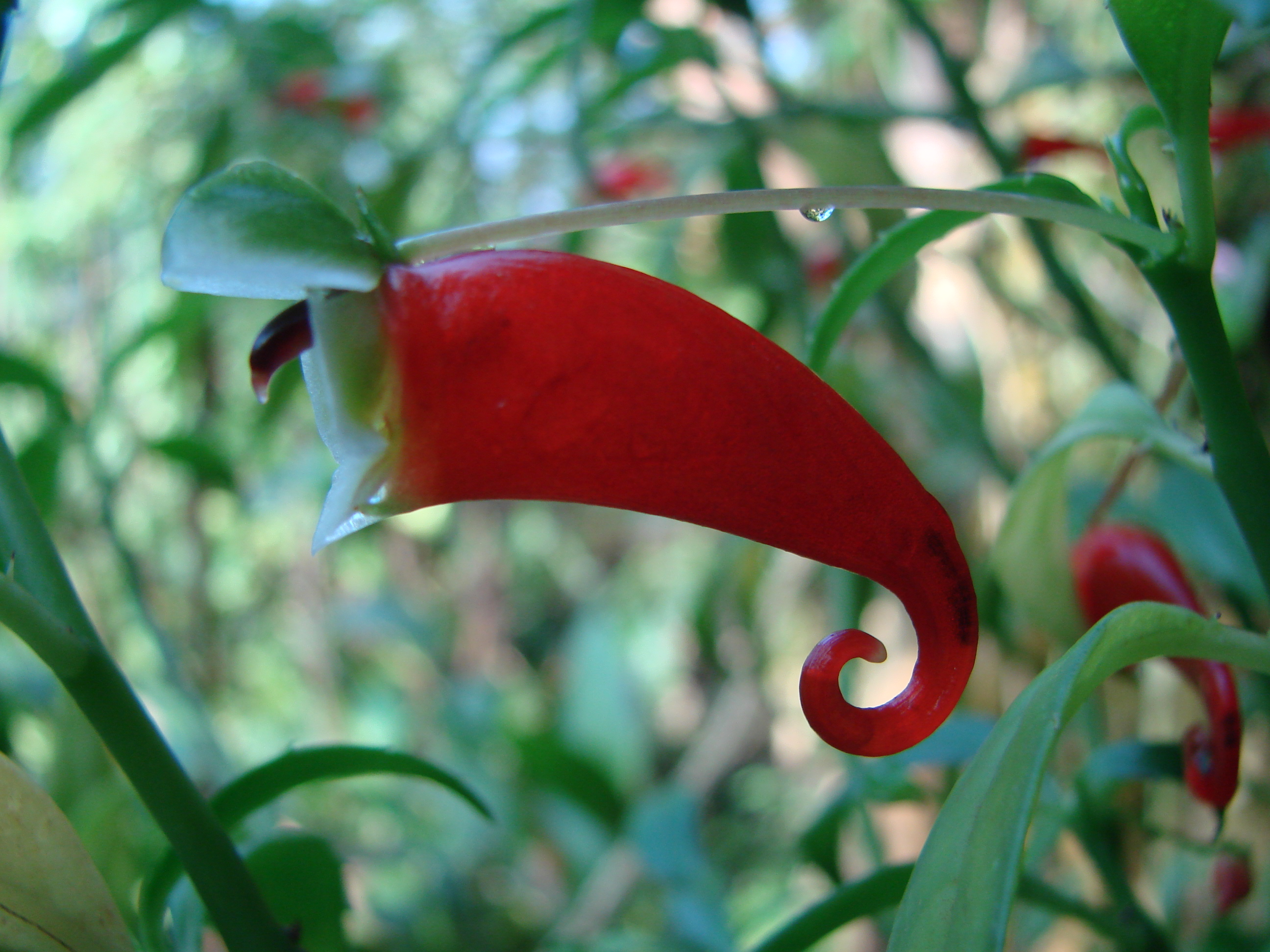
Impatiens paucidentata

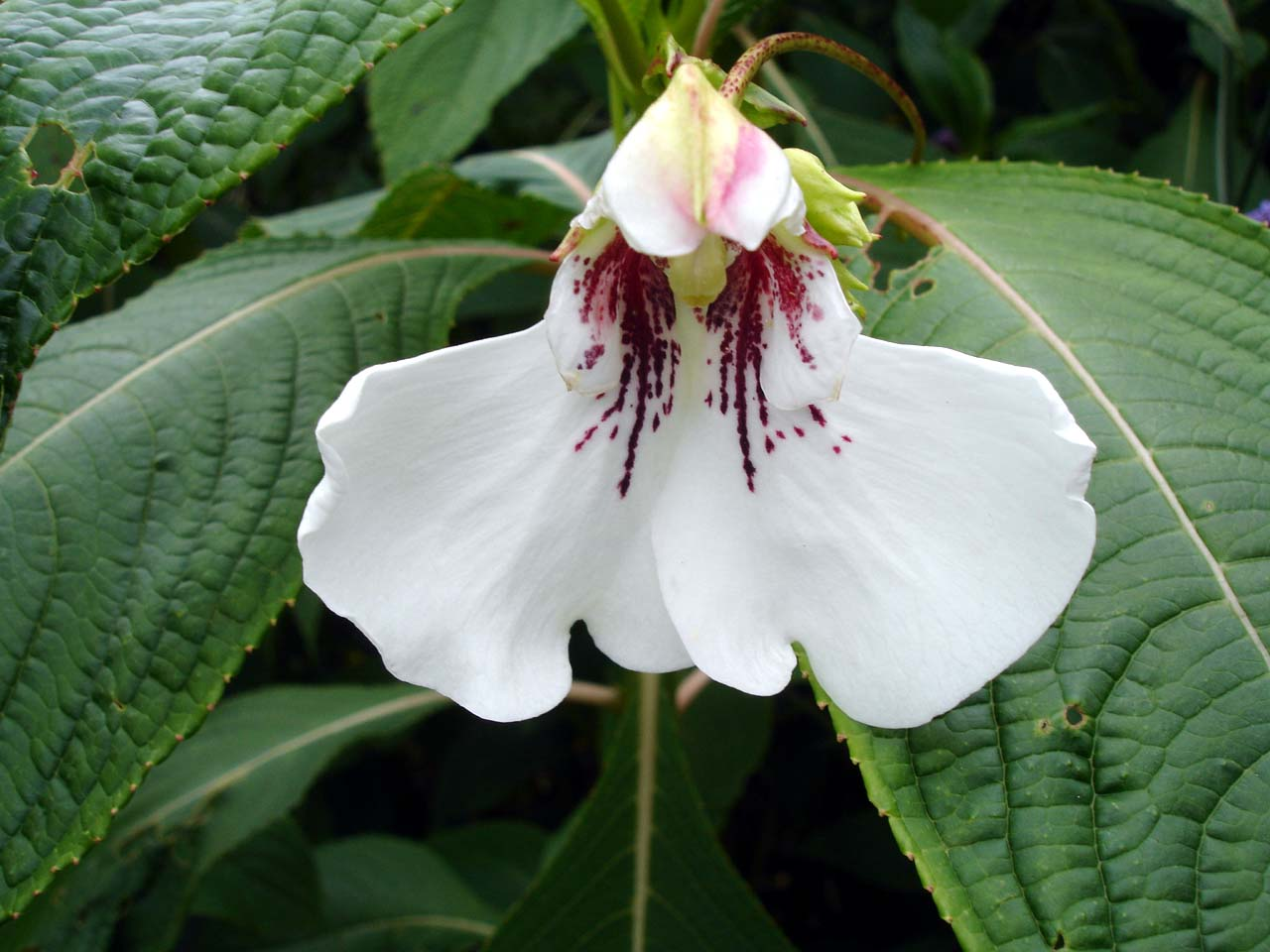
Impatiens tinctoria

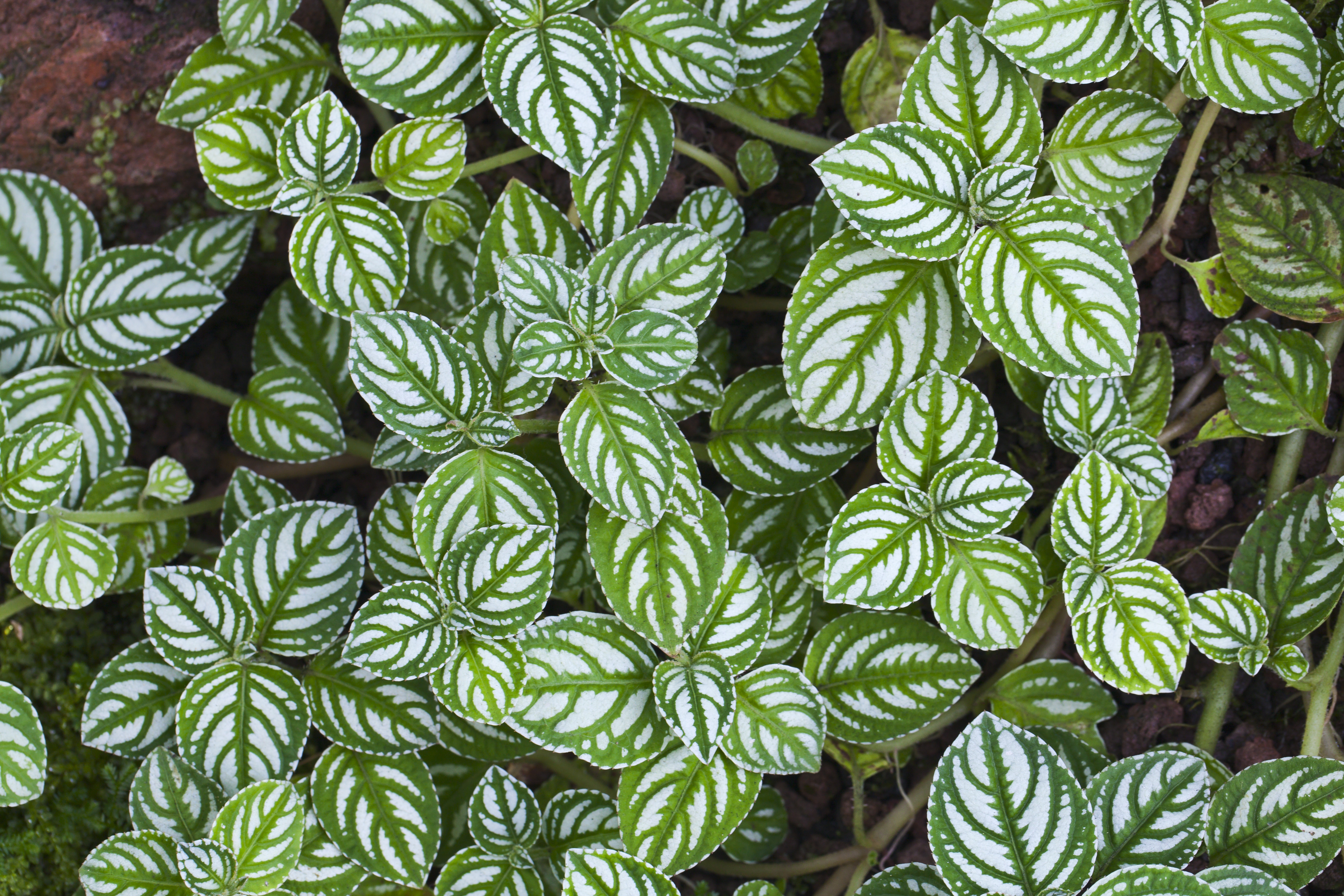
Impatiens marianae

Impatiens munronii in Western Ghats

- Impatiens acaulis (Nilgiri Hills endemic)
- Impatiens acehensis
- Impatiens adenioides Suksathan & Keerat
- Impatiens arguta
- Impatiens arriensii (Zoll.) T.Shimizu – Madura balsam
- Impatiens aurella – Idaho jewelweed, mountain jewelweed, varied jewelweed
- Impatiens auricoma
- Impatiens balfourii – Kashmir balsam
- Impatiens balsamina – garden balsam, rose balsam
- Impatiens bicornuta
- Impatiens bokorensis
- Impatiens calcicola – thian pa (Thai)
- Impatiens campanulata
- Impatiens capensis – orange jewelweed, orange balsam, common jewelweed, spotted jewelweed, touch-me-not
- Impatiens celebica
- Impatiens chinensis
- Impatiens charisma Suksathan & Keerat
- Impatiens chumphonensis T. Shimizu
- Impatiens columbaria Bos
- Impatiens cristata
- Impatiens daraneenae Suksathan & Triboun
- Impatiens dempoana
- Impatiens denisonii (Nilgiri Hills endemic)
- Impatiens dewildeana
- Impatiens diepenhorstii
- Impatiens doitungensis Triboun & Sonsupab
- Impatiens ecornuta – spurless touch-me-not, spurless jewelweed
- Impatiens edgeworthii
- Impatiens elianae – Eliane's balsam
- Impatiens etindensis
- Impatiens eubotrya
- Impatiens flaccida
- Impatiens forbesii
- Impatiens frithii
- Impatiens glandulifera – Himalayan balsam, Indian balsam, policeman's helmet
- Impatiens gordonii
- Impatiens grandis
- Impatiens grandisepala
- Impatiens halongensis
- Impatiens hawkeri W.Bull – New Guinea impatiens, spreading impatiens
- Impatiens heterosepala
- Impatiens hians
- Impatiens holstii
- Impatiens hongkongensis – Hong Kong balsam
- Impatiens horizontalis M.M.Latt, B.B.Park & Nob.Tanaka
- Impatiens irvingii
- Impatiens javensis
- Impatiens jerdoniae
- Impatiens jiewhoei Triboun & Suksathan
- Impatiens johnsiana
- Impatiens kawttyana Chhabra 2016
- Impatiens kilimanjari – Kilimanjaro impatiens
- Impatiens kinabaluensis (Kinabalu National Park endemic)
- Impatiens korthalsiana
- Impatiens laticornis (Nilgiri Hills endemic)
- Impatiens lawsonii (Nilgiri Hills endemic)
- Impatiens letouzeyi
- Impatiens levingei (Nilgiri Hills endemic)
- Impatiens linearifolia
- Impatiens malabarica
- Impatiens marianae
- Impatiens meruensis
- Impatiens mirabilis
- Impatiens morsei
- Impatiens msisimwanensis
- Impatiens namchabarwensis – blue diamond impatiens
- Impatiens namkatensis T. Shimizu
- Impatiens neo-barnesii (Nilgiri Hills endemic)
- Impatiens niamniamensis Gilg – Congo cockatoo
- Impatiens nilagirica Chhabra 2016
- Impatiens noli-tangere – touch-me-not balsam
- Impatiens obesa
- Impatiens omeiana
- Impatiens oppositifolia
- Impatiens orchioides (Nilgiri Hills endemic)
- Impatiens oreophila Triboun & Suksathan
- Impatiens pallida – pale jewelweed, yellow jewelweed
- Impatiens parviflora – small balsam, small-flowered touch-me-not
- Impatiens paucidentata
- Impatiens petersiana
- Impatiens phahompokensis T. Shimizu & P. Suksathan
- Impatiens phengklaii T. Shimizu & P. Suksathan
- Impatiens platypetala
- Impatiens pritzelii
- Impatiens pseudoviola Gilg
- Impatiens psittacina – parrot flower
- Impatiens pyrrhotricha
- Impatiens raktakesara M.Vishnu & Nampy
- Impatiens repens – Ceylon balsam, yellow impatiens
- Impatiens rosulata
- Impatiens rufescens (Nilgiri Hills endemic)
- Impatiens ruthiae Suksathan & Triboun
- Impatiens sakeriana
- Impatiens salpinx Schulze & Launert
- Impatiens santisukii T. Shimizu
- Impatiens scabrida DC.
- Impatiens scapiflora (Nilgiri Hills endemic)
- Impatiens sidikalangensis
- Impatiens singgalangensis
- Impatiens sirindhorniae Triboun & Suksathan
- Impatiens sivarajanii
- Impatiens sodenii Engl. & Warb. – poor man's rhododendron
- Impatiens spectabilis Triboun & Suksathan
- Impatiens sulcata
- Impatiens sumatrana
- Impatiens taihmushkulni Chhabra 2016
- Impatiens tapanuliensis
- Impatiens tenella (Nilgiri Hills endemic)
- Impatiens textorii Chhabra 2016
- Impatiens teysmanni
- Impatiens thomassetii
- Impatiens tigrina Suksathan & Triboun
- Impatiens tinctoria A.Rich.
- Impatiens tribounii T. Shimizu & P. Suksathan
- Impatiens walleriana – busy lizzie
- Impatiens wibkeae
- Impatiens wilsoni
- Impatiens yinyinkyii M.M.Latt, B.B.Park & Nob.Tanaka
- Impatiens zombensis Baker
