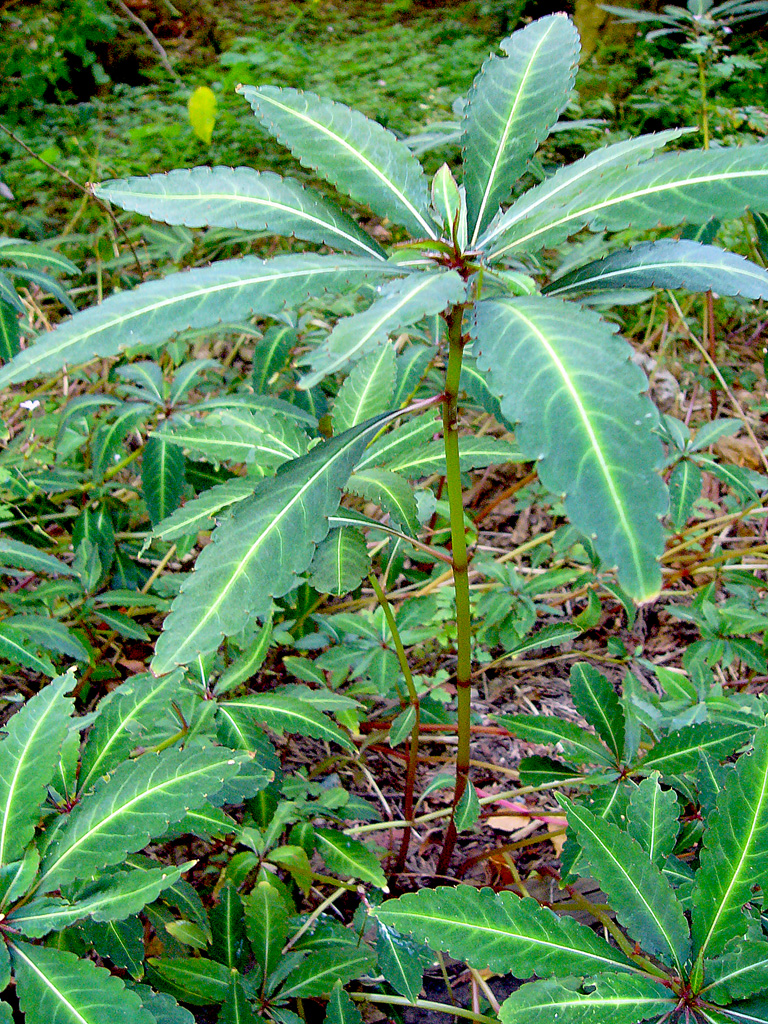

Conservation status
- Endangered (IUCN 3.1)

Scientific classification
- Kingdom: Plantae
- Clade: Tracheophytes
- Clade: Angiosperms
- Clade: Eudicots
- Clade: Asterids
- Order: Ericales
- Family: Balsaminaceae
- Genus: Impatiens
- Species: I. omeiana

Binomial name
- Impatiens omeiana Hook.f.

Synonyms
- Impatiens tubulosa f. omeiensis E.Pritz.

= Impatiens omeiana =

Species of flowering plant

Impatiens omeiana is a species of flowering plant in the family Balsaminaceae. It is endemic to Sichuan in south-central China.

The wild plant is rhizomatous, growing up to half a meter tall, with large, yellow flowers.

It is grown in cultivation as an ornamental plant. One common name is hardy impatiens. Cultivars include 'Eco Hardy' and 'Ice Storm'.
