= Impatiens pritzelii =

Conservation status
- Endangered (IUCN 3.1)

Scientific classification
- Kingdom: Plantae
- Clade: Tracheophytes
- Clade: Angiosperms
- Clade: Eudicots
- Clade: Asterids
- Order: Ericales
- Family: Balsaminaceae
- Genus: Impatiens
- Species: I. pritzelii

Binomial name
- Impatiens pritzelii Hook.f.

Synonyms
- Impatiens pritzelii var. hupehensis Hook.f.; Impatiens tubulosa f. multiflora E.Pritz.

Species of flowering plant

Impatiens pritzelii is a species of flowering plant in the family Balsaminaceae. It is a subshrub native to eastern Sichuan and northwestern Hubei in south-central China.
