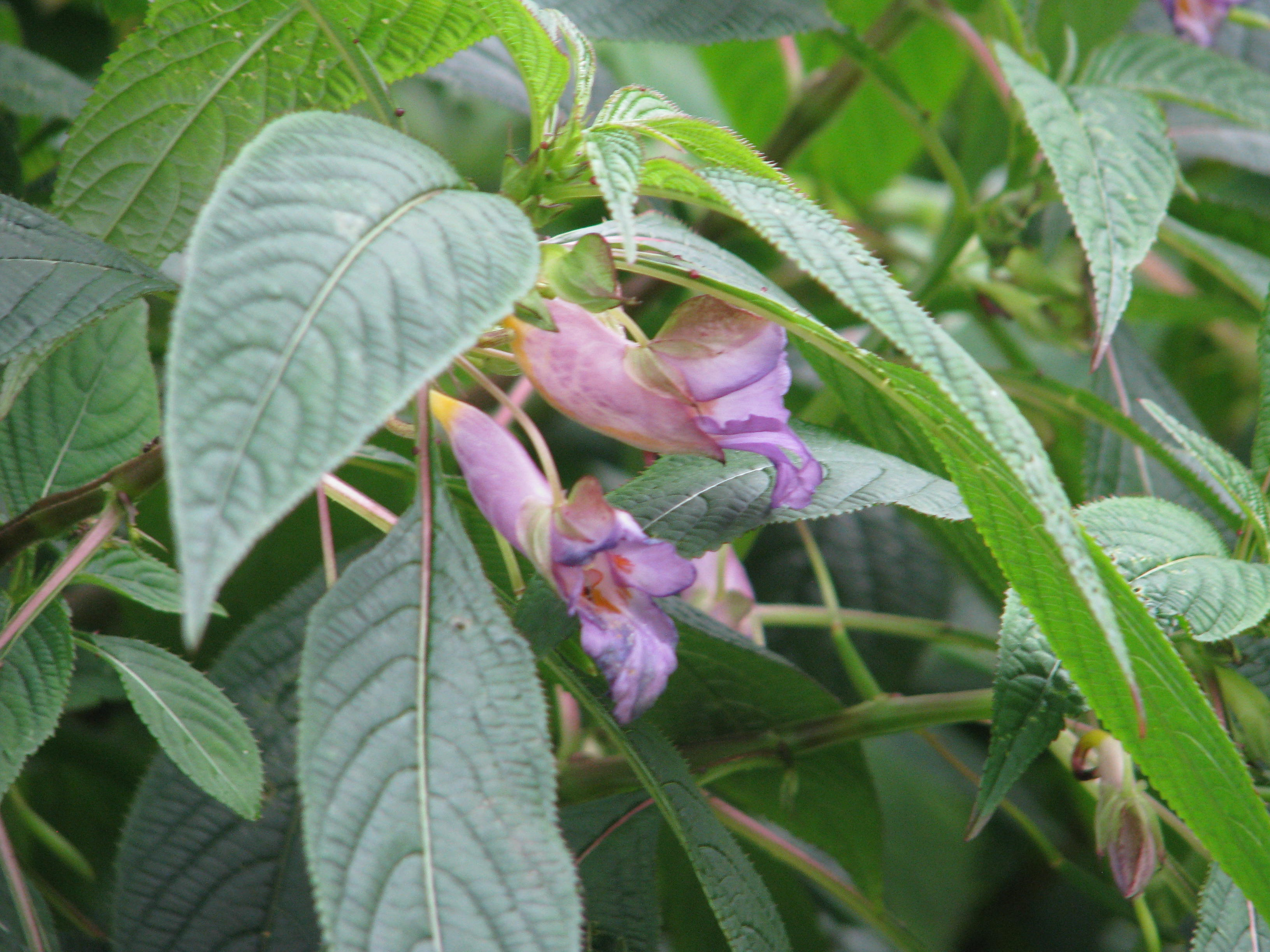

Scientific classification
- Kingdom: Plantae
- Clade: Tracheophytes
- Clade: Angiosperms
- Clade: Eudicots
- Clade: Asterids
- Order: Ericales
- Family: Balsaminaceae
- Genus: Impatiens
- Species: I. arguta

Binomial name
- Impatiens arguta Hook.f. & Thomson

= Impatiens arguta =

Species of flowering plant

Impatiens arguta, the toothed busy lizzie, is a species of flowering plant in the balsam family Balsaminaceae. It is native to Bhutan, Nepal, Myanmar, India and China. This herbaceous perennial grows to 30 cm (12 in) tall and broad, with an erect habit. It has deeply-veined, elliptic, slightly toothed leaves. Delicate lavender-blue or pink flowers appear in summer. As with other Impatiens species, the stems and leaves are succulent and fleshy.

This plant is cultivated as an ornamental. Although hardy to −10 °C (14 °F), it requires a sheltered position in full or partial shade, and a protective mulch in winter. Plants may become evergreen in warmer climates. It grows in moist places, forest understories and thickets.

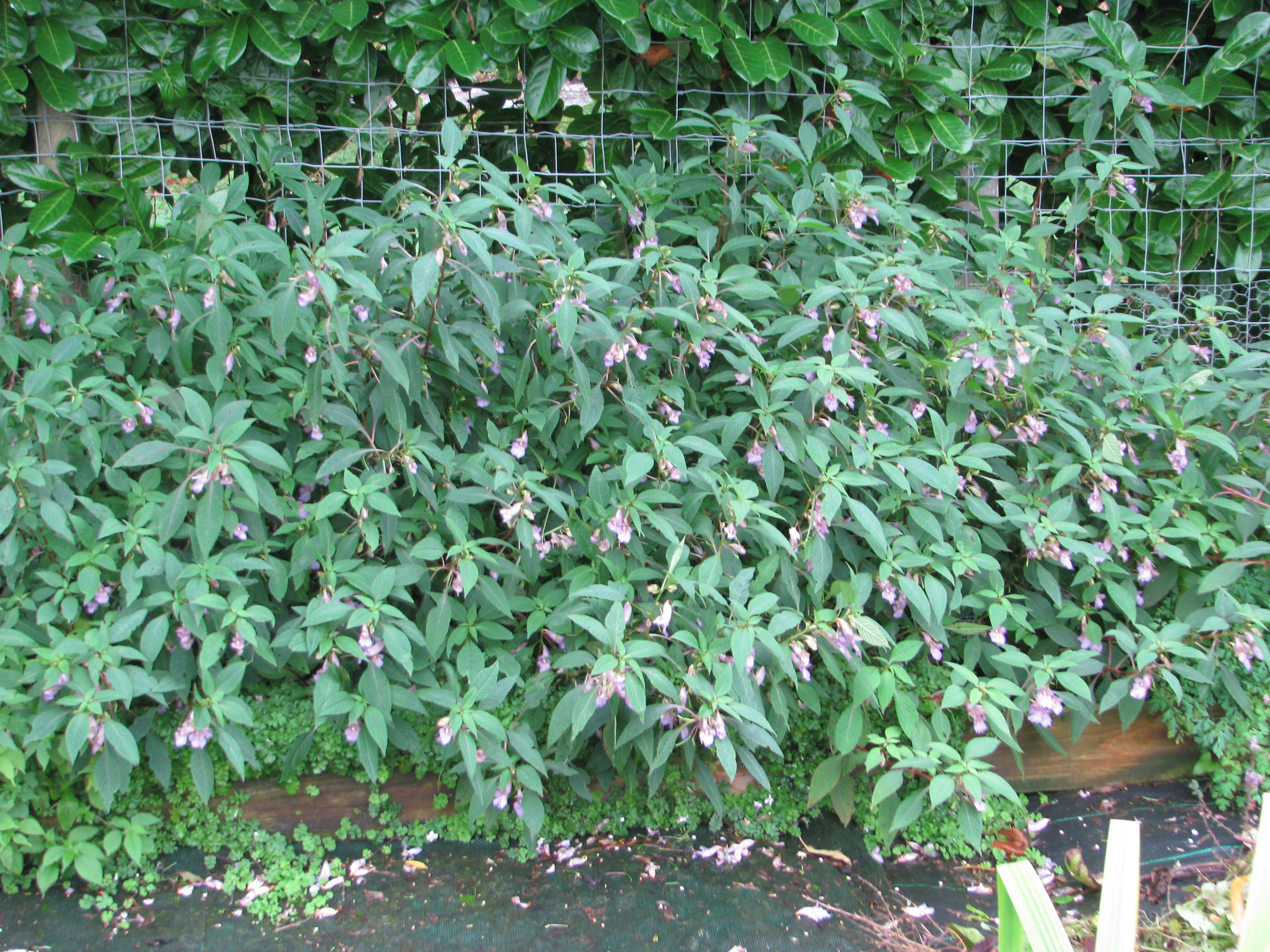
