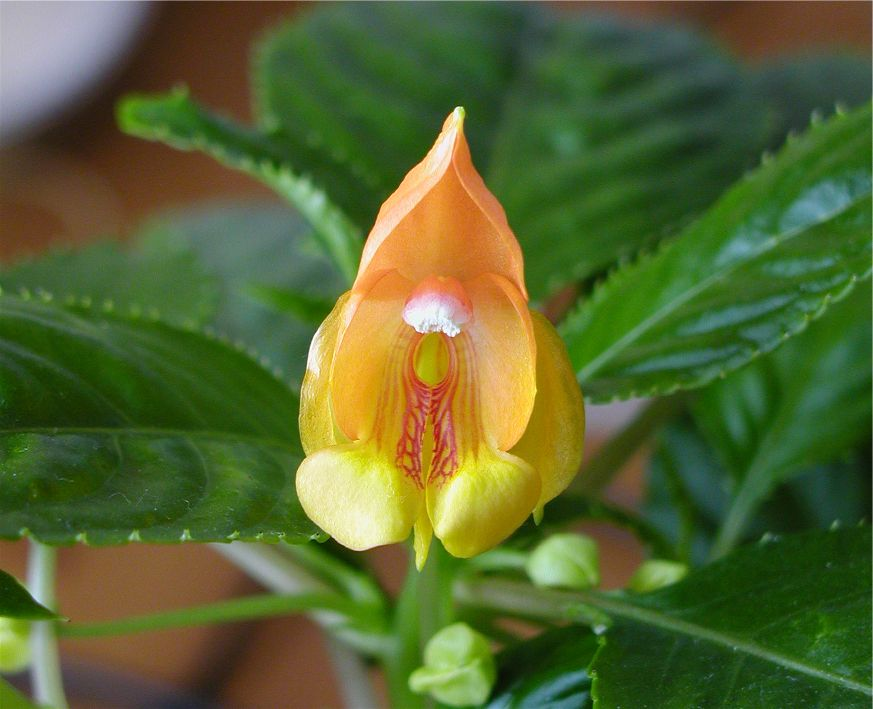
- Impatiens auricoma 'Jungle Gold'

Scientific classification
- Kingdom: Plantae
- Clade: Tracheophytes
- Clade: Angiosperms
- Clade: Eudicots
- Clade: Asterids
- Order: Ericales
- Family: Balsaminaceae
- Genus: Impatiens
- Species: I. auricoma

Binomial name
- Impatiens auricoma Baill.

= Impatiens auricoma =

Species of flowering plant

Impatiens auricoma is a species of flowering plant in the family Balsaminaceae. It is endemic to the Comoro Islands. Cultivars are available for use as ornamental plants.
