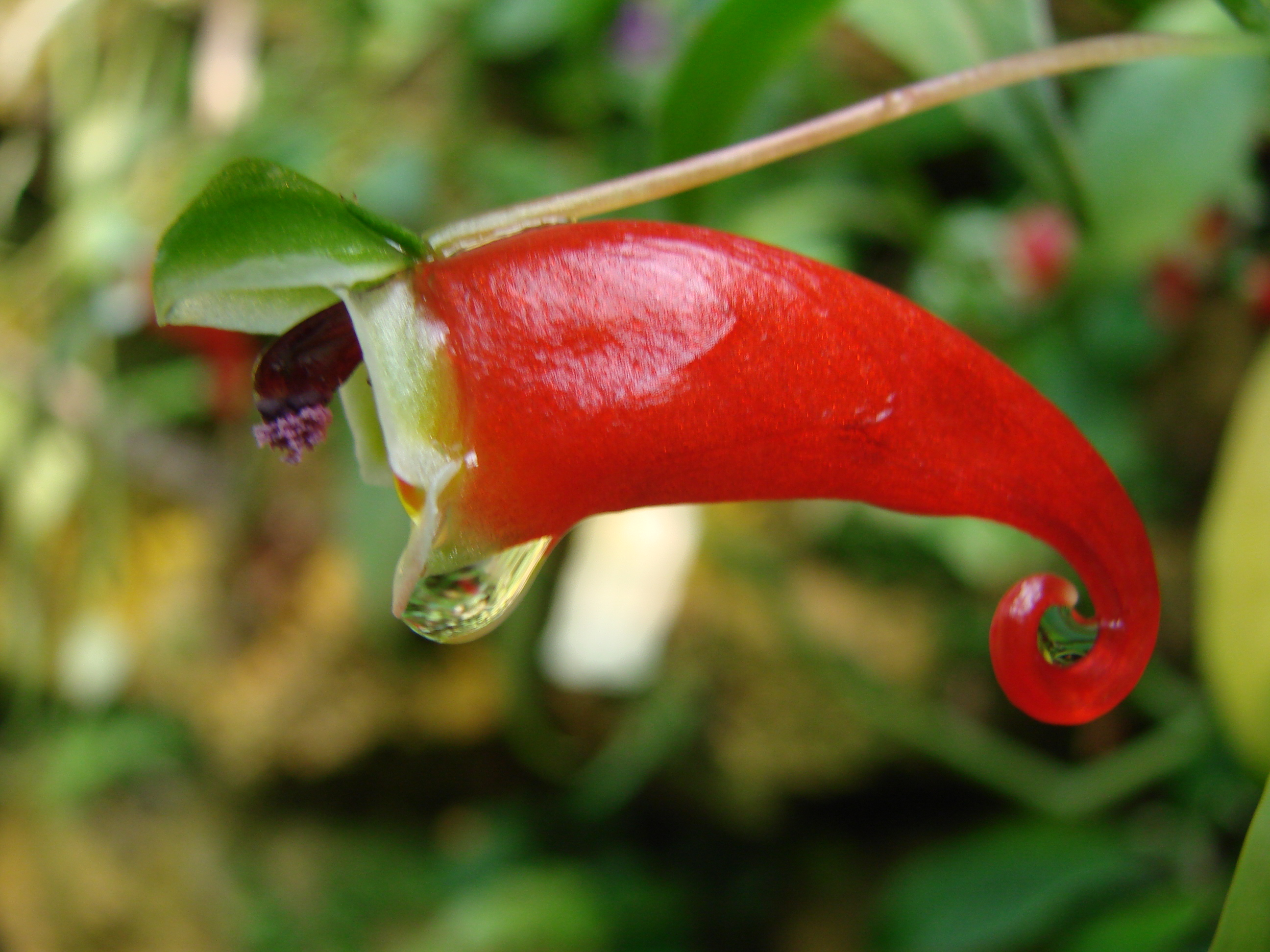

Scientific classification
- Kingdom: Plantae
- Clade: Tracheophytes
- Clade: Angiosperms
- Clade: Eudicots
- Clade: Asterids
- Order: Ericales
- Family: Balsaminaceae
- Genus: Impatiens
- Species: I. paucidentata

Binomial name
- Impatiens paucidentata De Wild.

= Impatiens paucidentata =

Species of flowering plant

Impatiens paucidentata is an epiphytic species of Impatiens native to Uganda and the eastern Democratic Republic of the Congo.
