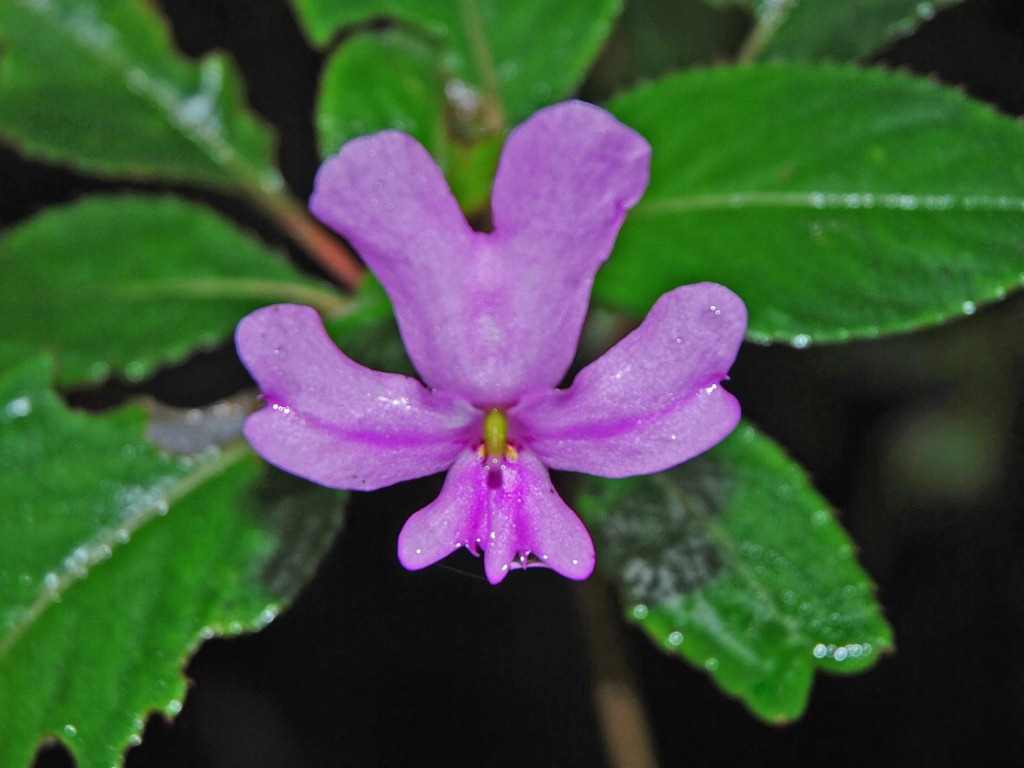

Scientific classification
- Kingdom: Plantae
- Clade: Tracheophytes
- Clade: Angiosperms
- Clade: Eudicots
- Clade: Asterids
- Order: Ericales
- Family: Balsaminaceae
- Genus: Impatiens
- Species: I. kinabaluensis

Binomial name
- Impatiens kinabaluensis S. Akiyama & H. Ohba, 2005

= Impatiens kinabaluensis =

Species of flowering plant

Impatiens kinabaluensis, the Kinabalu balsam, is a flowering plant in the family Balsaminaceae. It is endemic to Borneo.

== Etymology ==
The genus name Impatiens (Latin for "impatient") refers to the explosive dehiscence of the fruit. The species name kinabaluensis refers to Mount Kinabalu, the type locality.

== Description ==
Impatiens kinabaluensis reaches about 90 centimetres (35 in) in height. It has long, rigid stems. The leaves are about 3-4 inches long, dark green, entire, ovate to lanceolate-ovate, ribbed and shiny. The upper surface has a thick, water-repellent cuticula. The flowers are pink-lilac and bloom from April through November.

== Distribution ==
This plant occurs in Kinabalu National Park in Sabah on the island of Borneo.

== Habitat ==
It grows in shaded rainforests, with moist, well-drained soil, at an altitude of about 1,700 metres (5,600 ft) above sea level.
