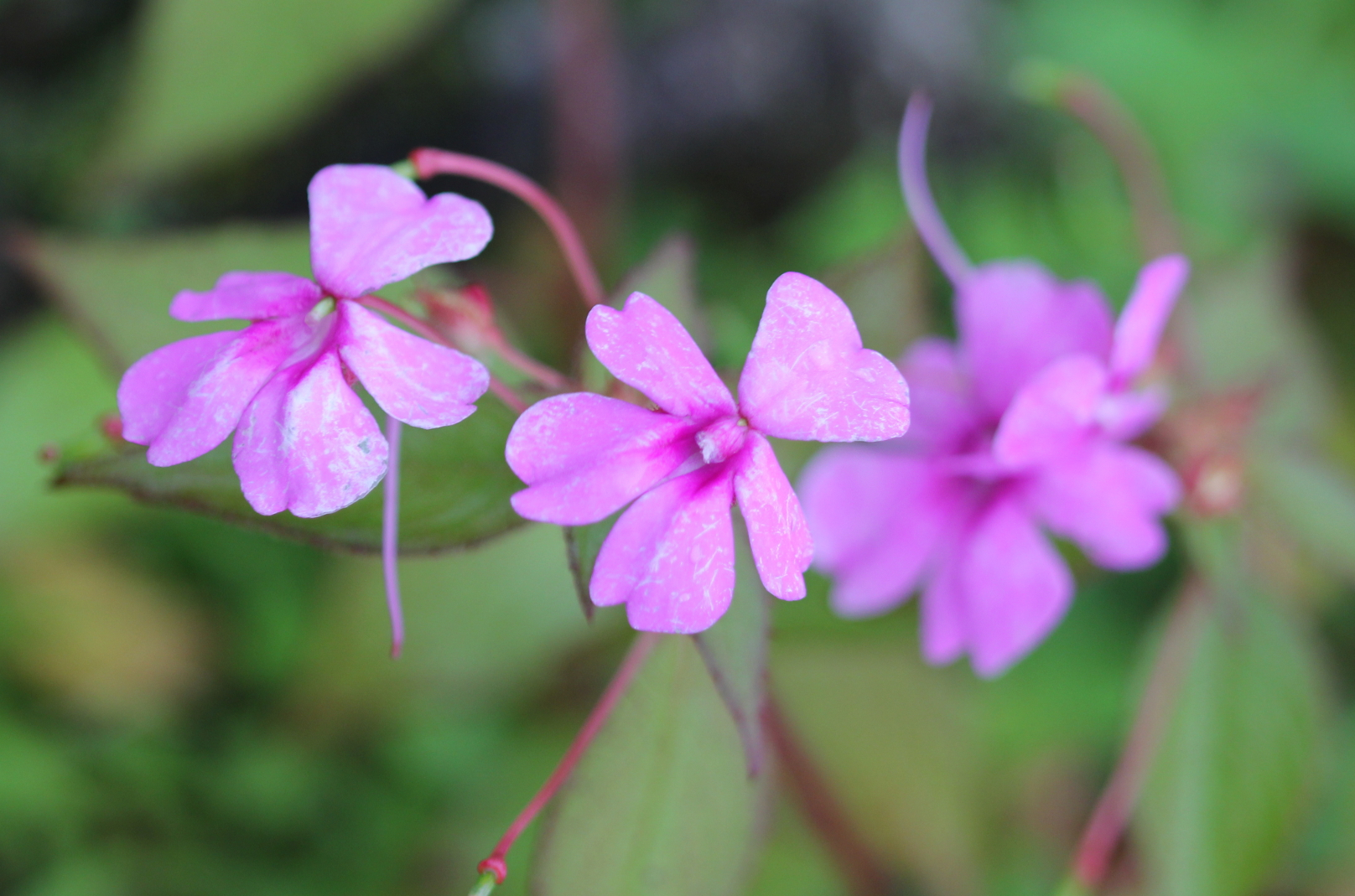

Scientific classification
- Kingdom: Plantae
- Clade: Tracheophytes
- Clade: Angiosperms
- Clade: Eudicots
- Clade: Asterids
- Order: Ericales
- Family: Balsaminaceae
- Genus: Impatiens
- Species: I. flaccida

Binomial name
- Impatiens flaccida Arn.

= Impatiens flaccida =

Species of flowering plant

Impatiens flaccida is a species of flowering plant native to the Western Ghats in India and to Sri Lanka. It is an erect or decumbent herb with thin stems growing to 50 cm (20 in) in length. They root at the lower nodes. The alternate leaves are ovate-lanceolate, growing 3 to 8 cm (1.2 to 3.1 in) long and 2 to 3.5 cm (0.79 to 1.38 in) wide. The flowers are light purple with dark eyes, and are 3 to 4 cm (1.2 to 1.6 in) wide.

The plant has naturalized on the islands of Mauritius and Réunion.
