= Impatiens bokorensis =

Scientific classification
- Kingdom: Plantae
- Clade: Tracheophytes
- Clade: Angiosperms
- Clade: Eudicots
- Clade: Asterids
- Order: Ericales
- Family: Balsaminaceae
- Genus: Impatiens
- Species: I. bokorensis

Binomial name
- Impatiens bokorensis S.H.Cho & B.Y.Kim

Species of flowering plant

Impatiens bokorensis is a flowering plant of the family Balsaminaceae, only known to be found in the Phnum Bokor National Park in the Kampot Province of Cambodia. It is characterized as growing from 15–40 cm (6–20 in) tall, with a branching, deep purple-red stem with alternating leaves and purple-red flowers. It is most typically found in the park on sandstone tables in evergreen forests at 1,050 m (3,440 ft) above sea level.

Impatiens bokorensis is reported to produce little capsules with scurfy hair that contain three to four seeds in August and fruit in November.

The plant can be distinguished from its most similar cousin I. patula by its orbicular-obovate dorsal petal, shorter pedicels and larger seeds.
