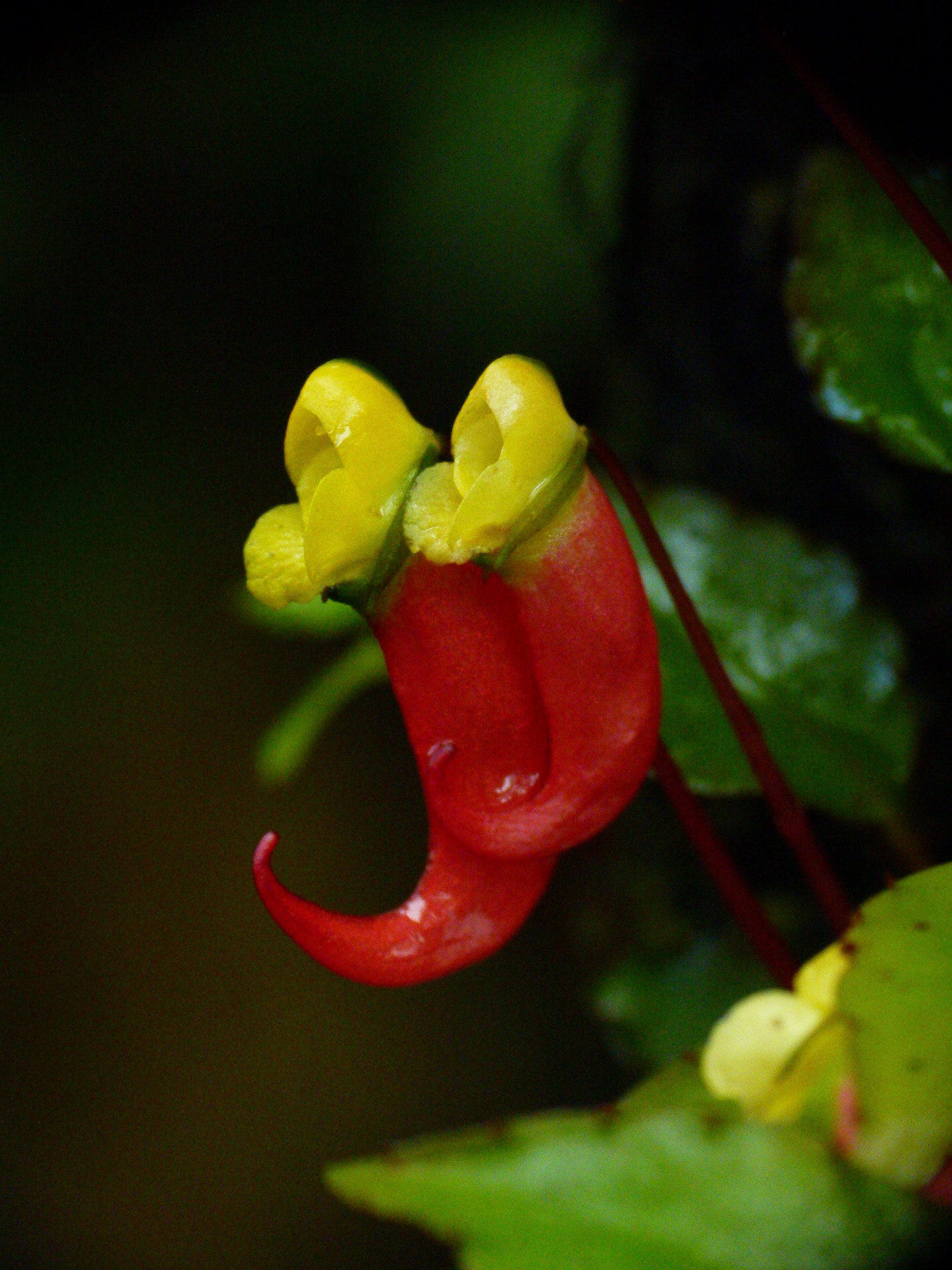

Scientific classification
- Kingdom: Plantae
- Clade: Tracheophytes
- Clade: Angiosperms
- Clade: Eudicots
- Clade: Asterids
- Order: Ericales
- Family: Balsaminaceae
- Genus: Impatiens
- Species: I. jerdoniae

Binomial name
- Impatiens jerdoniae Wight

= Impatiens jerdoniae =

Species of flowering plant

Impatiens jerdoniae is a species of flowering plant in the family Balsaminaceae. It is native to the Western Ghats of India. It was described and named by Robert Wight and commemorates Flora Jerdon, wife of Thomas C. Jerdon. It grows on rocks and as an epiphyte on trees.
