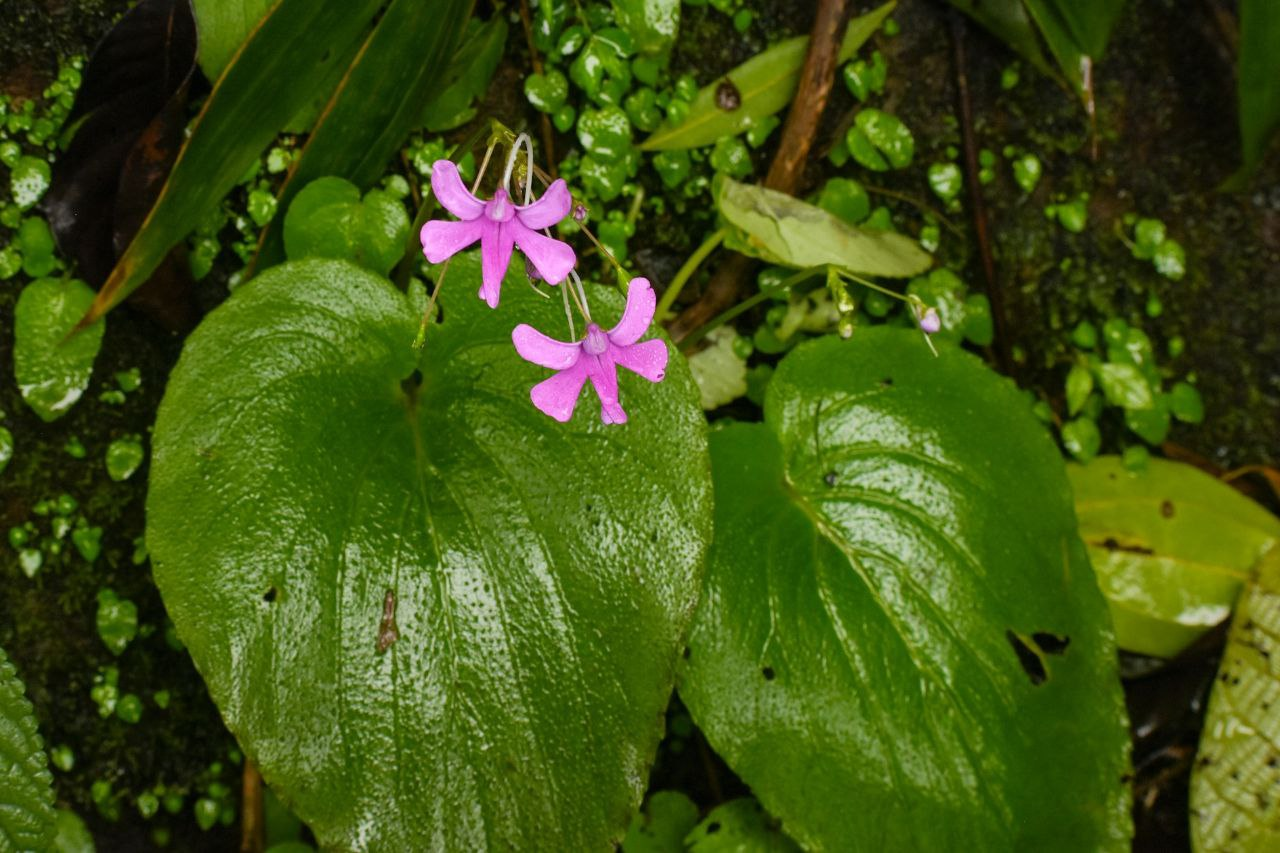

Scientific classification
- Kingdom: Plantae
- Clade: Tracheophytes
- Clade: Angiosperms
- Clade: Eudicots
- Clade: Asterids
- Order: Ericales
- Family: Balsaminaceae
- Genus: Impatiens
- Species: I. scapiflora

Binomial name
- Impatiens scapiflora B.Heyne ex Wall

= Impatiens scapiflora =

Species of plant

Impatiens scapiflora is a species of flowering plant in the family Balsaminaceae. Impatiens scapiflora or Leafless-Stem Balsam is a terrestrial or epiphytic or lithophytic herb endemic to Western Ghats.

== Description ==
It is a scapigerous, tuberous or rhizomatous herb, growing up to 35 cm high. There are 2-5 leaves per tuber. Ovate leaves are hairless, cordate at base with crenate or distantly serrate margins. Leaf -stalks are 10–20 cm long. Flowering stem or scape is up to 35 cm long. Flowers are 4 cm across and narrow towards apex. Ovate and acute bracts are 5–8 mm long. Flower stalks are 4–5 cm long. Lip is ovate and obtuse and spur 4–5 cm long. Sepals are 4 x 3 mm, ovate and acute. Lobes of wings are subequal and oblong. Ellipsoid fruit capsule is 1.2 cm long. Seeds are glandular and hairy.

== Gallery ==
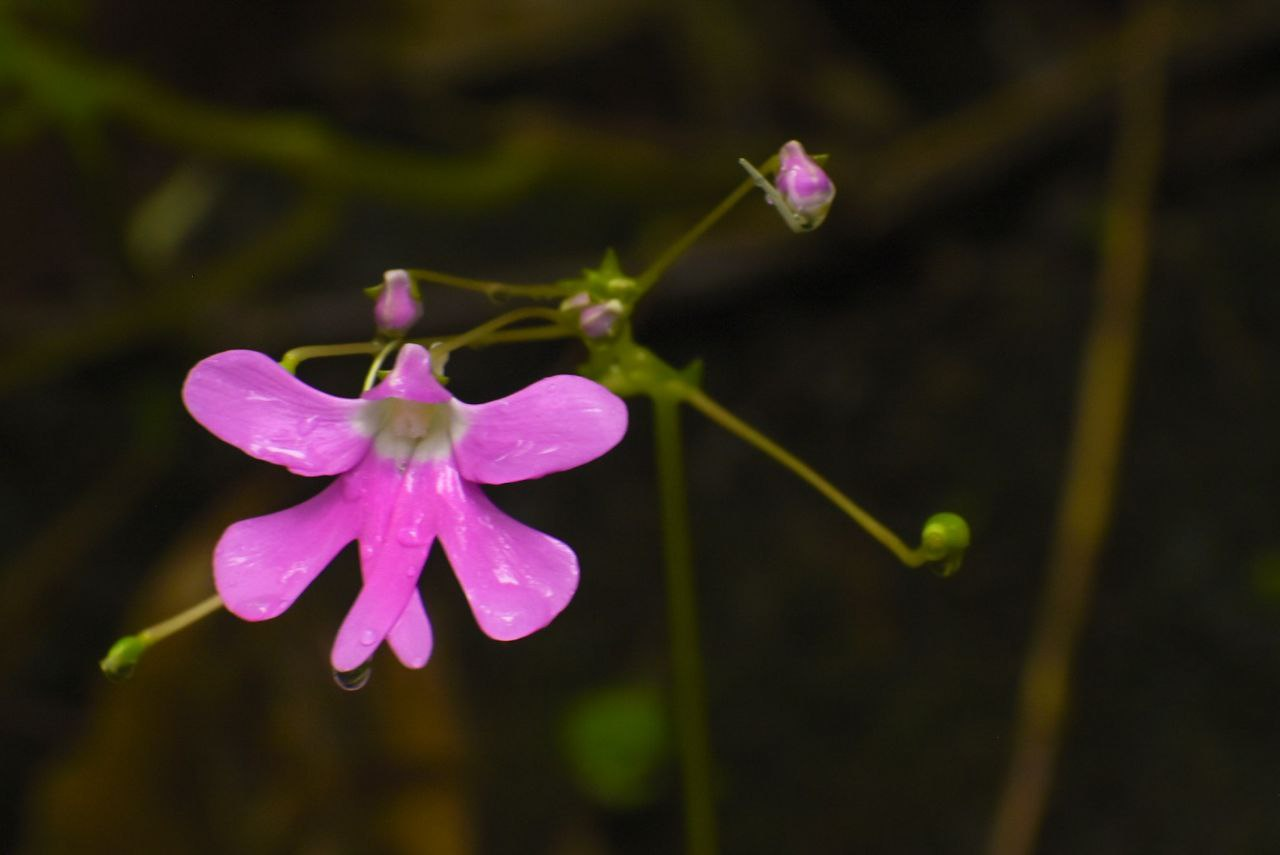

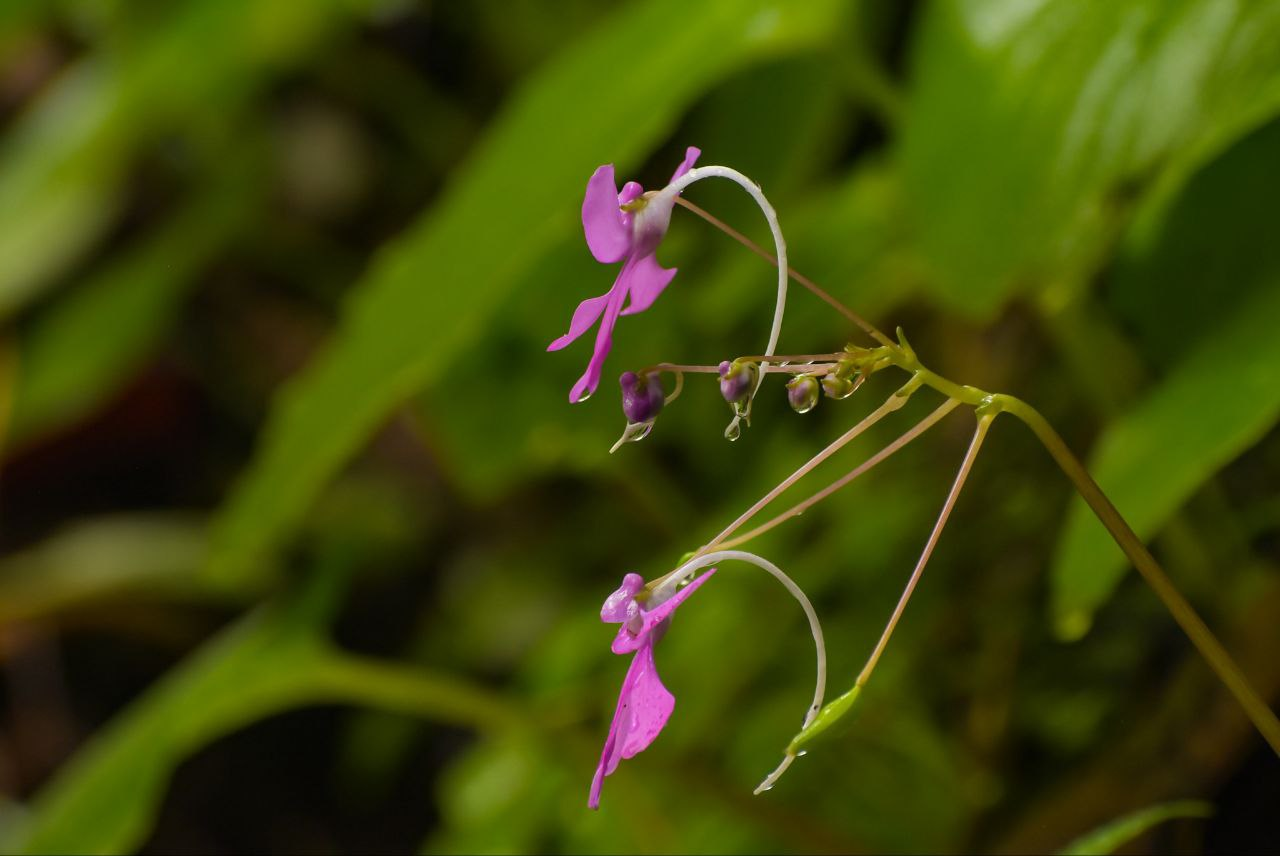
