= Impatiens letouzeyi =

Conservation status
- Endangered (IUCN 3.1)

Scientific classification
- Kingdom: Plantae
- Clade: Tracheophytes
- Clade: Angiosperms
- Clade: Eudicots
- Clade: Asterids
- Order: Ericales
- Family: Balsaminaceae
- Genus: Impatiens
- Species: I. letouzeyi

Binomial name
- Impatiens letouzeyi Grey-Wilson

Species of flowering plant

Impatiens letouzeyi is a species of flowering plant in the family Balsaminaceae. It is endemic to Cameroon, where it occurs in the Bakossi Mountains. It grows as an epiphyte in trees and shrubs, as well as a terrestrial herb. It is threatened by plans for the construction of a reservoir in the area.
