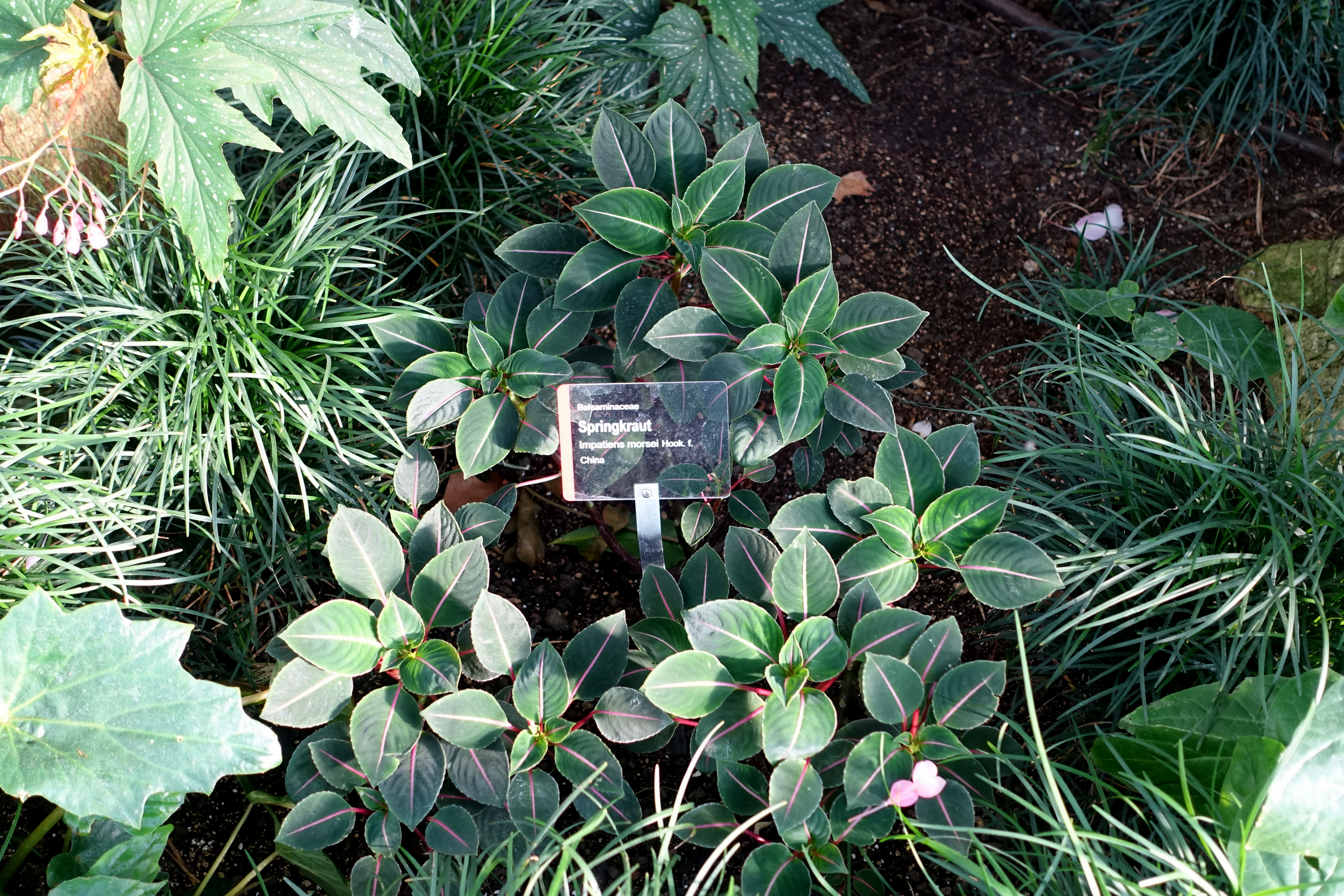

Conservation status
- Vulnerable (IUCN 3.1)

Scientific classification
- Kingdom: Plantae
- Clade: Embryophytes
- Clade: Tracheophytes
- Clade: Spermatophytes
- Clade: Angiosperms
- Clade: Eudicots
- Clade: Asterids
- Order: Ericales
- Family: Balsaminaceae
- Genus: Impatiens
- Species: I. morsei

Binomial name
- Impatiens morsei Hook.f.

= Impatiens morsei =

Species of flowering plant

Impatiens morsei is a species of flowering plant in the family Balsaminaceae. It is endemic to China, where it only occurs in Guangxi.

It is a perennial plant with a succulent, purplish stem growing up to a meter tall. It produces white, pink, or purple flowers with orange throats. It grows in moist, shady habitat such as forest understory.

It grows specifically in forest margins, along streamsides, and in damp places at elevations between 300 and 1,000 meters.
