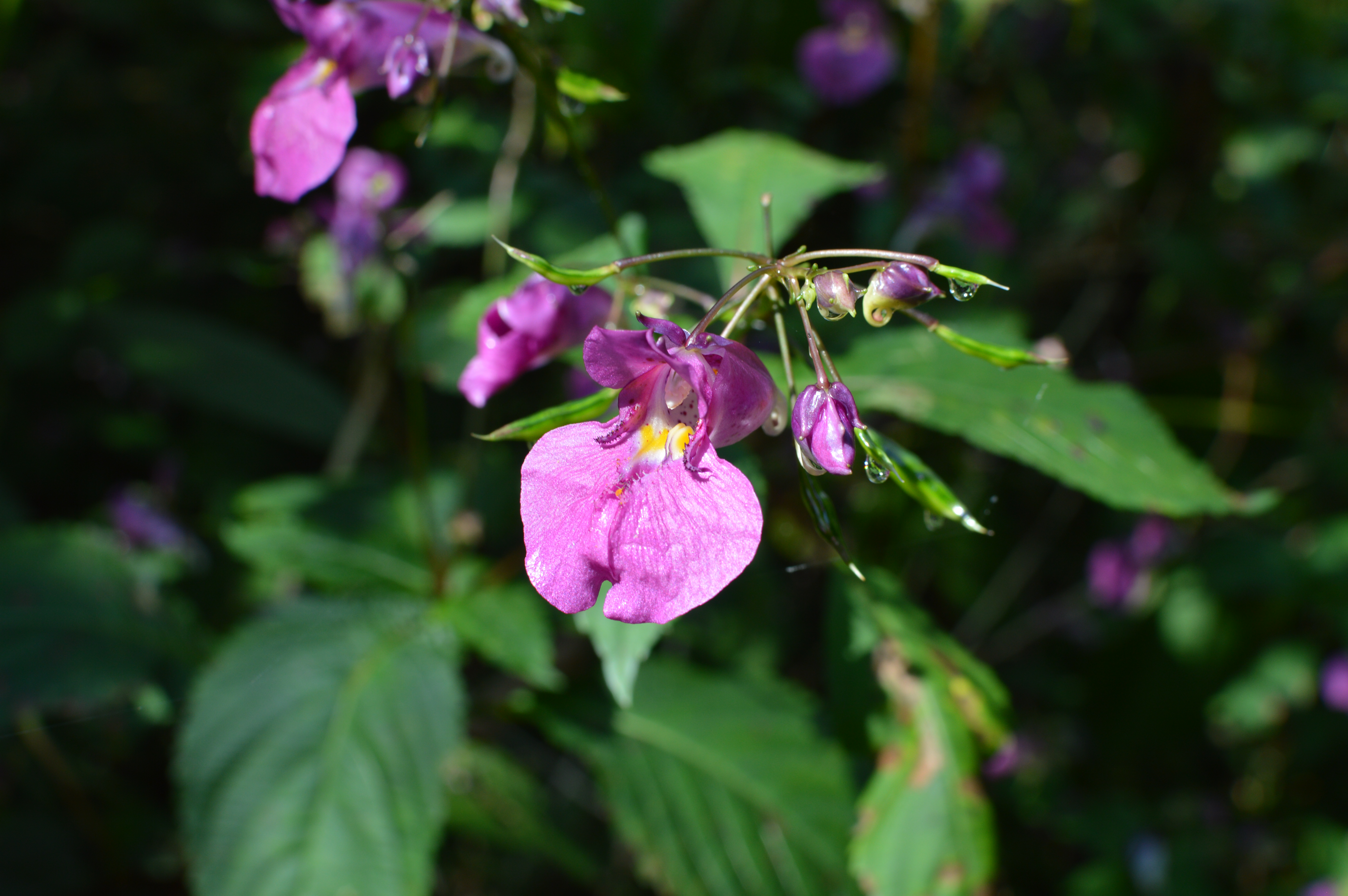
- Flower, Mudeungsan National Park, South Korea

Scientific classification
- Kingdom: Plantae
- Clade: Embryophytes
- Clade: Tracheophytes
- Clade: Angiosperms
- Clade: Eudicots
- Clade: Asterids
- Order: Ericales
- Family: Balsaminaceae
- Genus: Impatiens
- Species: I. textorii

Binomial name
- Impatiens textorii Miq.

Synonyms
- 11 synonyms: Impatiens atrosanguinea (Nakai) B.U.Oh & W.P.Hong; Impatiens hypophylla var. koreana (Nakai) Nakai; Impatiens japonica Franch. & Sav.; Impatiens kojeensis Y.N.Lee; Impatiens koreana Nakai; Impatiens textorii var. atrosanguinea Nakai; Impatiens textorii var. koreana (Nakai) Nakai; Impatiens textorii f. minuscula Hayashi; Impatiens textorii var. pallescens Honda; Impatiens textorii f. pallescens (Honda) H.Hara; Impatiens textorii f. sordida Hayashi

= Impatiens textorii =

Species of flowering plant

Impatiens textorii is a species of flowering plant in the family Balsaminaceae. It is native to East Asia, including China, Japan, the Korean Peninsula, Mongolia and eastern Siberia. It is an introduced species in New Zealand. It was first described in 1865 by Dutch botanist Friedrich Anton Wilhelm Miquel as Impatiens textori, i.e. with one 'i'.

== Description ==
Impatiens textorii is a succulent annual herb that typically grows to a height of 40 to 80 cm. The stems are green, often tinted with purple at the nodes, and are notably fragile and brittle. Its leaves are arranged alternately along the stem, displaying a broadly lanceolate to ovate-lanceolate shape with sharply serrated margins.

The flowers are approximately 3 cm long and are predominantly reddish-purple. The lower sepal is highly enlarged and deeply saccate, taking on a distinct boat-shaped appearance. A defining characteristic of I. textorii is its slender nectar spur, which loops or tightly coils spirally at its apex; this distinct trait morphologically separates it from the co-occurring Impatiens noli-tangere, which features a straight or uncoiled spur. A rare, naturally occurring white-flowered color mutation is recognized as the form Impatiens textorii f. pallescens.

== Ecology ==
The species is entomophilous, relying heavily on insect pollinators. The unique curvature of its spiral nectar spur is evolutionary tailored to accommodate the long proboscis of local bumblebees. To prevent self-pollination, the flowers exhibit protandry, a reproductive strategy where the male stamens mature, shed pollen, and drop away before the female pistil becomes receptive to cross-pollination.

== Vernacular names ==
In Japan, the plant is commonly referred to as Tsuri-fune-so (ツリフネソウ), meaning "hanging boat weed," in reference to the way the flowers hang from their stalks like small boats.
