= Impatiens obesa =

Conservation status
- Endangered (IUCN 3.1)

Scientific classification
- Kingdom: Plantae
- Clade: Tracheophytes
- Clade: Angiosperms
- Clade: Eudicots
- Clade: Asterids
- Order: Ericales
- Family: Balsaminaceae
- Genus: Impatiens
- Species: I. obesa

Binomial name
- Impatiens obesa Hook.f.

Species of flowering plant

Impatiens obesa is a species of flowering plant in the family Balsaminaceae. It is an annual endemic to northern Guangdong and Jiangxi provinces of southern China.
