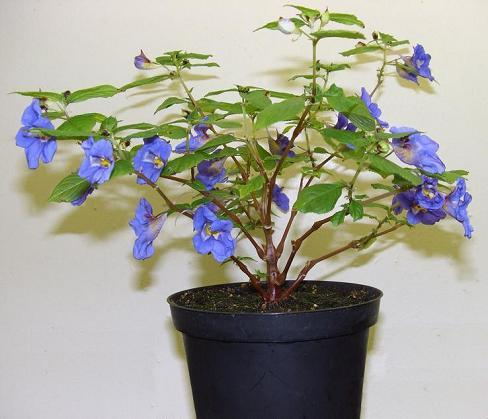

Scientific classification
- Kingdom: Plantae
- Clade: Tracheophytes
- Clade: Angiosperms
- Clade: Eudicots
- Clade: Asterids
- Order: Ericales
- Family: Balsaminaceae
- Genus: Impatiens
- Species: I. namchabarwensis

Binomial name
- Impatiens namchabarwensis R.Morgan, Yuan Yong-Ming & Ge Xue-Jun

= Impatiens namchabarwensis =

Species of flowering plant

Impatiens namchabarwensis (blue diamond impatiens) is a 40–50 cm tall plant, native to the Himalaya. It is an annual plant, although it may live for several years in mild climates that do not freeze in winter.

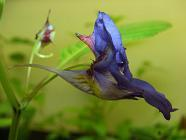
Impatiens namchabarwensis

This new species was discovered in the Namcha Barwa canyon in Tibet in the summer of 2003 by Yuan Yong-Ming and Ge Xue-Jun.

It was growing at an elevation of 930 m in a very limited area.

Stems are much branched, slightly woody at base; lower stems decumbent, often rooting at nodes.

Flowers are bright ultramarine blue, with small white markings at center and yellow in throat.

It has explosive seedpods, like the other species of the family Balsaminaceae. Seeds are brown when ripe, ca. 1 mm.

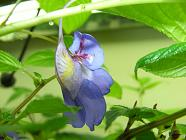
Impatiens namchabarwensis

The scientific name is sometimes misspelled as "Impatiens namchabawensis".
