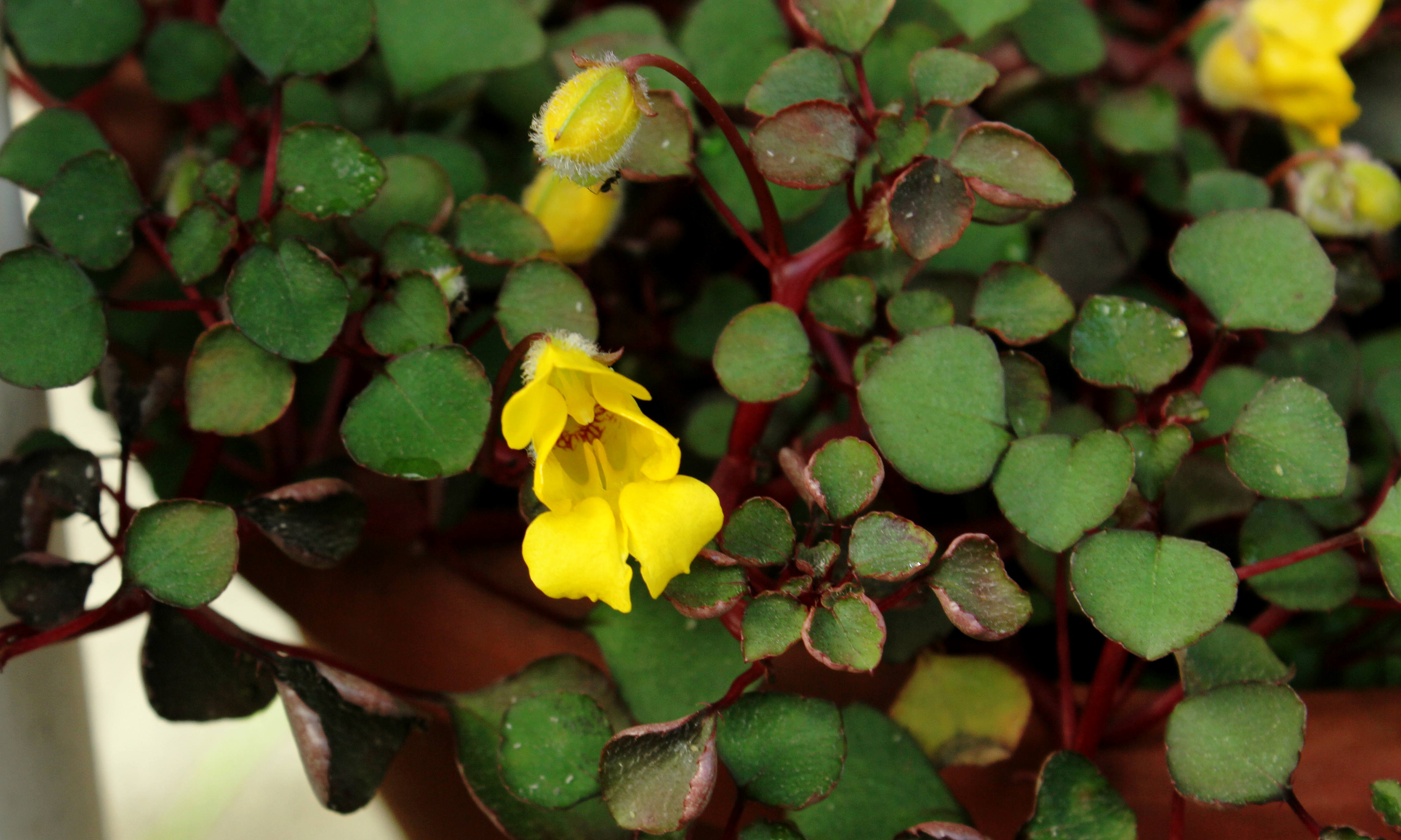

Scientific classification
- Kingdom: Plantae
- Clade: Tracheophytes
- Clade: Angiosperms
- Clade: Eudicots
- Clade: Asterids
- Order: Ericales
- Family: Balsaminaceae
- Genus: Impatiens
- Species: I. repens

Binomial name
- Impatiens repens Moon

= Impatiens repens =

Species of flowering plant

Impatiens repens, the Ceylon balsam, yellow impatiens, or creeping balsam, is a species of flowering plant in the family Balsaminaceae, from Sri Lanka. As the Latin name repens indicates, it is a low-growing plant with a creeping habit. This evergreen perennial can be found in wet-zone rain forests. Growing to 50 cm (20 in) tall and broad, it has small kidney-shaped leaves borne on red stems, and hooded yellow flowers in summer and autumn. It can be seen cultivated in gardens as an ornamental plant. In temperate zones it must be protected from temperatures below 10 °C (50 °F), so must be grown under glass during the winter months, It requires a sheltered position in partial shade.

Impatiens repens has won the Royal Horticultural Society's Award of Garden Merit.

Parts of this plant are used in Sri Lankan traditional medicine for treating epilepsy.

== Description ==
Impatiens repens is a herbaceous plant with a sprawling or creeping habit. The small, light green leaves are approximately triangular with rounded edges. The round, fleshy stems are shiny purplish red. The bright yellow flowers resemble those of snapdragon (Antirrhinum majus). They are bilaterally symmetrical and composed of triangular petals with frilly edges. The outer surface of the flower tube is densely covered with short, white hairs.
