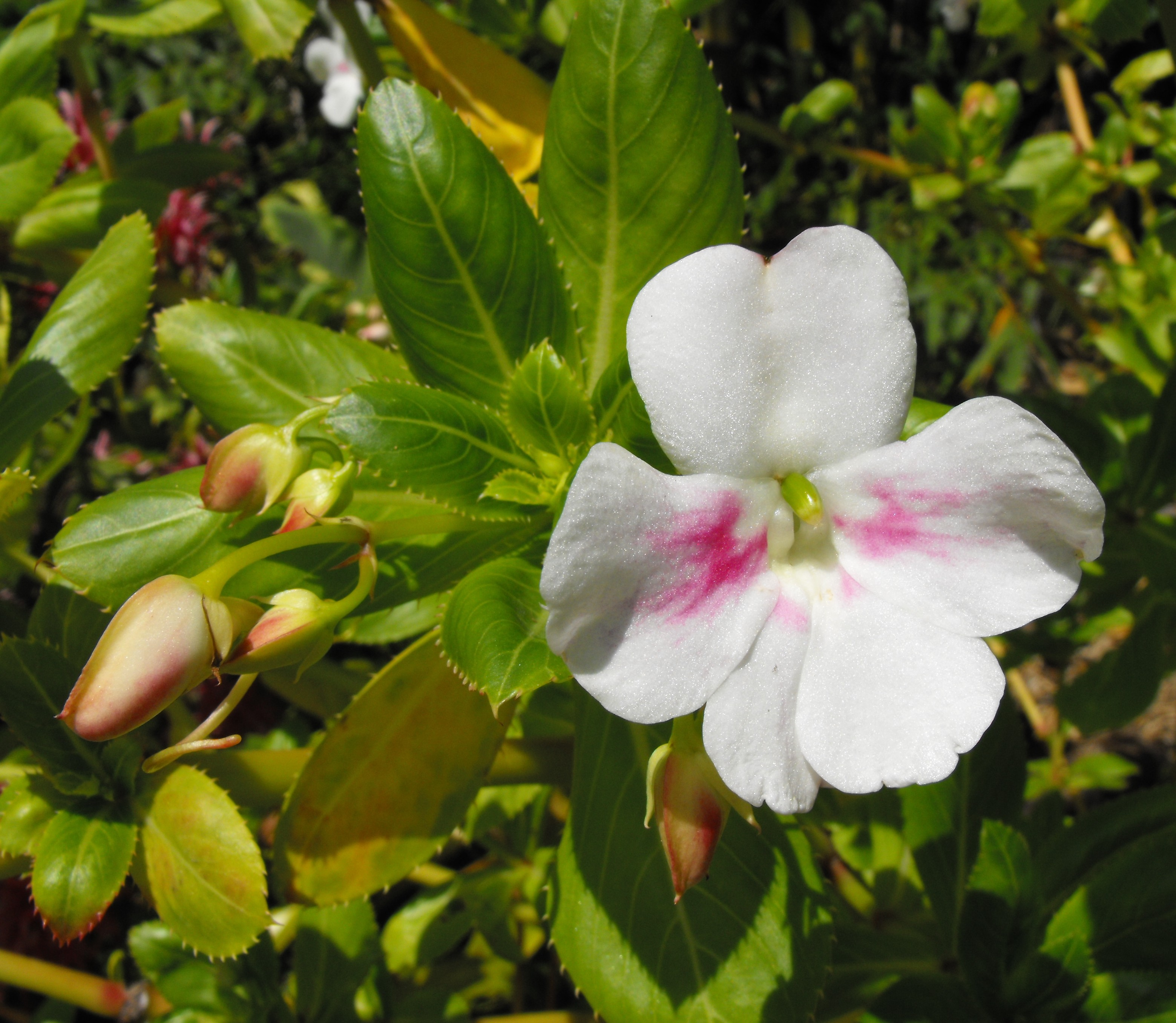

Scientific classification
- Kingdom: Plantae
- Clade: Tracheophytes
- Clade: Angiosperms
- Clade: Eudicots
- Clade: Asterids
- Order: Ericales
- Family: Balsaminaceae
- Genus: Impatiens
- Species: I. sodenii

Binomial name
- Impatiens sodenii Engl. & Warb.

Synonyms
- Impatiens elgonensis T.C.E.Fr.; Impatiens magnifica G.M.Schulze; Impatiens oliveri C.H.Wright ex W.Watson; Impatiens thomsonii Oliv.; Impatiens uguenensis Warb.

= Impatiens sodenii =

Species of flowering plant

Impatiens sodenii is a species of flowering plant in the family Balsaminaceae known by the common names poor man's rhododendron, Oliver's touch-me-not, and shrub balsam. It is native to Kenya and Tanzania, and widely cultivated as an ornamental plant.

== Description ==
This plant is a subshrub growing up to 2.5 meters tall. The stems are succulent, and woody toward the bases. It is hairless, with leaves in whorls of up to 12, especially near the ends of the branches. The leaves are widely lance-shaped, or occasionally more oblong, with toothed edges. They are up to 18 centimeters long.

Flowers occur year-round, singly or in pairs. They are pink, but white forms, sometimes with darker markings are found. Petals measure 5-6 centimeters (2 to 2.4 inches), but horticultural forms may be as large as 14 cm. (5.5 inches) in width. The lowest sepal behind the corolla tapers into a long, thin spur up to 8 centimeters long. The greenish fruit capsule is up to 2.4 centimeters long and undergoes explosive dehiscence when mature.

== Cultivation ==
This plant is used as an ornamental garden shrub, and is of easy cultivation in moderate climates. Once established it is moderately drought tolerant, but will flower more freely if watered consistently. It is tolerant of light frost. Propagation may be from cuttings, or from seed, if the seed can be caught.

It is a recipient of the Royal Horticultural Society's Award of Garden Merit.

Several cultivars have been selected or bred, including the very large white-flowered 'Madonna', 'Flash' with white flowers with pink markings, and 'La Vida Rosa' which has flowers marked with a deeper pink.

=== Weed ===
This is the most commonly grown impatiens in New Zealand, where it has escaped cultivation and become a weed. It is cultivated in Australia, where it has naturalized in a few areas in Western Australia and New South Wales. It is documented as an introduced species in the Canary Islands, Hawaii, and Colombia.
