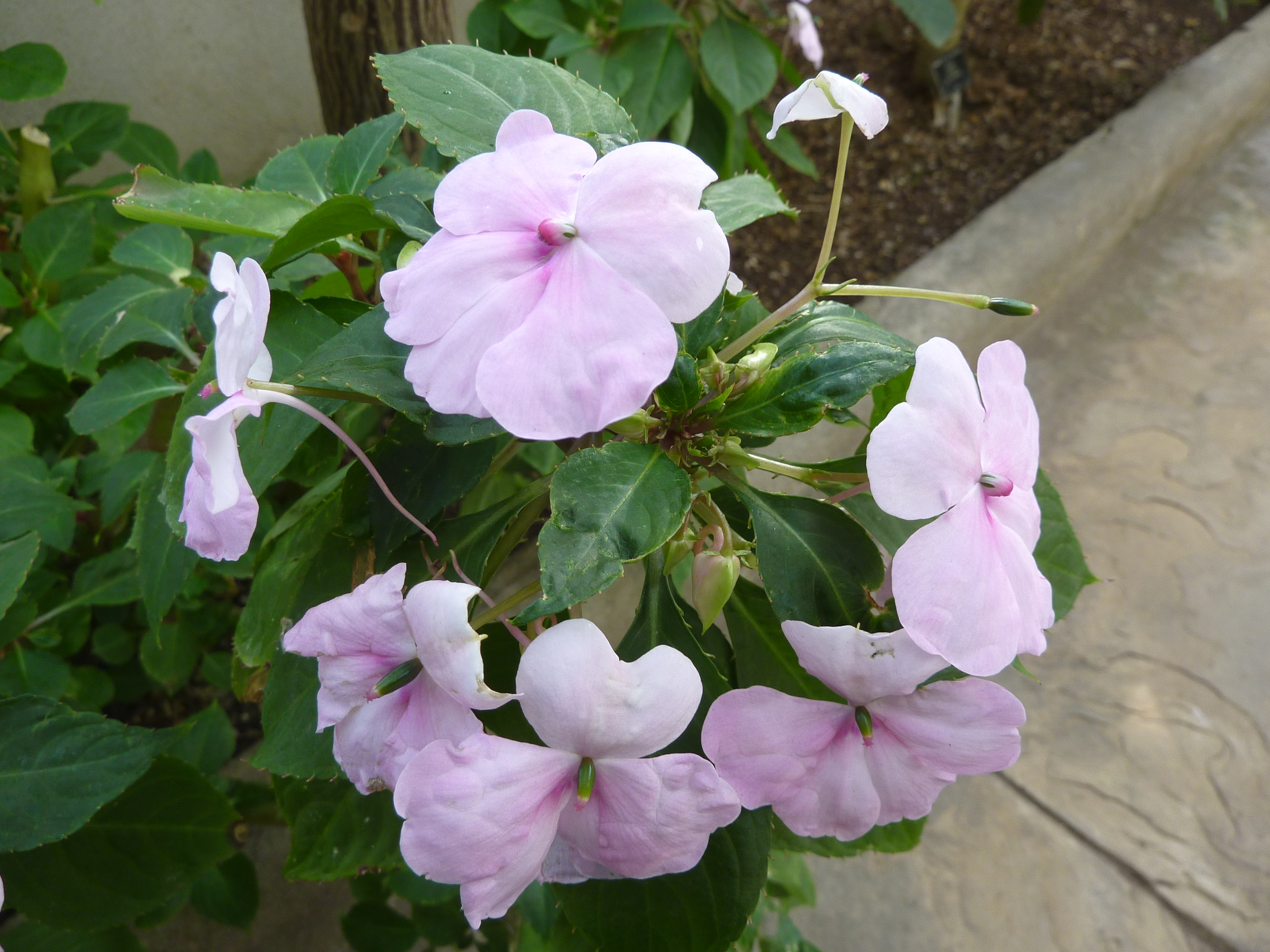

Conservation status
- Critically Endangered (IUCN 3.1)

Scientific classification
- Kingdom: Plantae
- Clade: Tracheophytes
- Clade: Angiosperms
- Clade: Eudicots
- Clade: Asterids
- Order: Ericales
- Family: Balsaminaceae
- Genus: Impatiens
- Species: I. gordonii

Binomial name
- Impatiens gordonii John Horne ex John Gilbert Baker

= Impatiens gordonii =

Species of plant

Impatiens gordonii also known as the Seychelles bizzie lizzie is a species of flowering plant in the family Balsaminaceae. It is critically endangered.

There is a species action plan.

== Distribution ==
It is endemic to the Seychelles.

== Taxonomy ==
It was named by John Horne ex John Gilbert Baker, in Fl. Mauritius: 38 in 1877.
