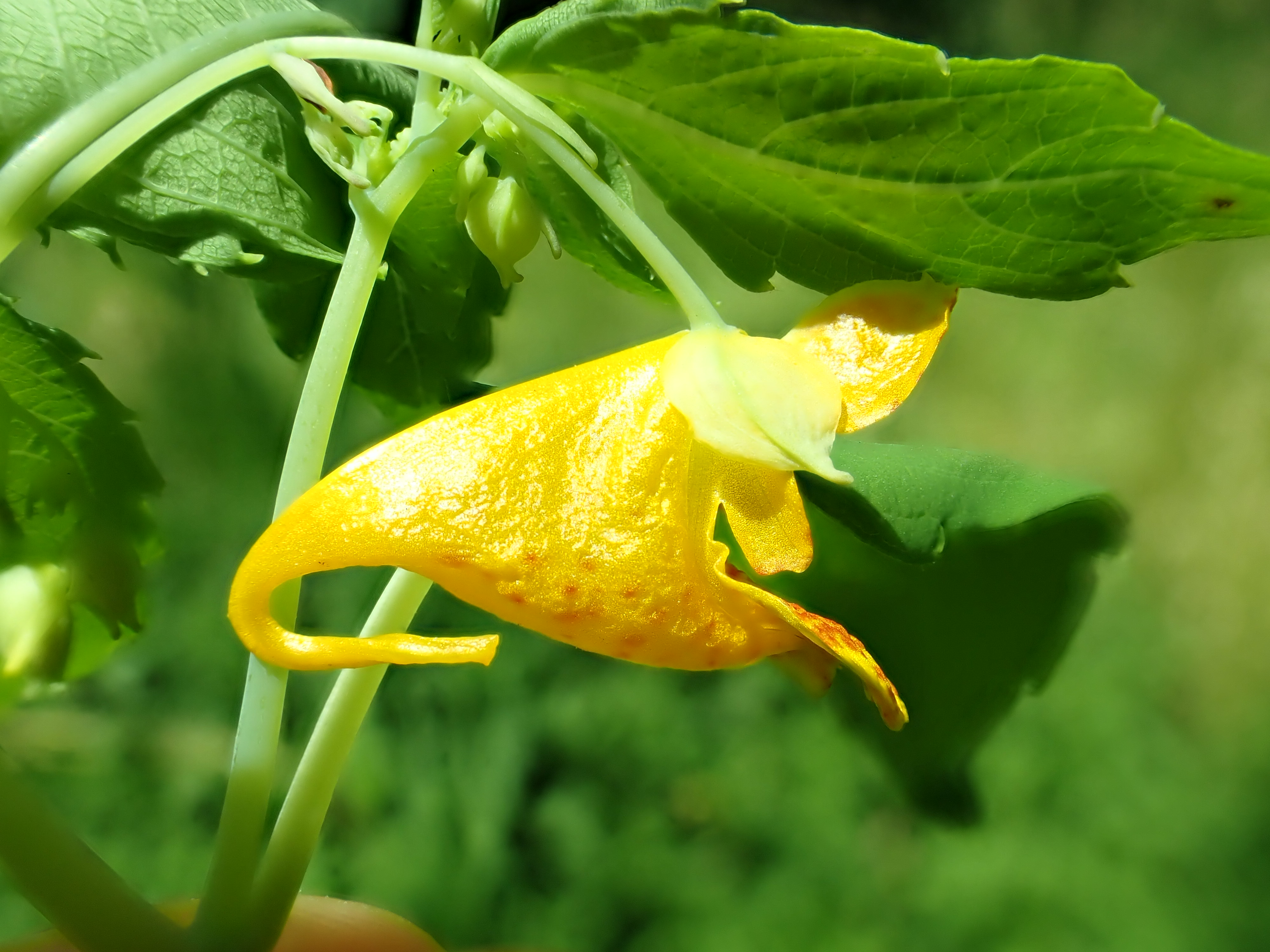
- Impatiens aurella, also known as the pale yellow touch-me-not

Scientific classification
- Kingdom: Plantae
- Clade: Tracheophytes
- Clade: Angiosperms
- Clade: Eudicots
- Clade: Asterids
- Order: Ericales
- Family: Balsaminaceae
- Genus: Impatiens
- Species: I. aurella

Binomial name
- Impatiens aurella Rydb. (1901)

= Impatiens aurella =

Species of flowering plant

Impatiens aurella, also known as the Idaho jewelweed, mountain jewelweed, varied jewelweed, or pale yellow touch-me-not, is a species of flowering plant in the family Balsaminaceae. It is found in northwest North America up through British Columbia, Canada. It produces a yellow-orange flower during the blooming months of late June/early July through September. The plant is an annual herb that grows to just over 1 m (3 ft 3 in) tall. As a member of the genus Impatiens it is also a touch-me-not, a herbaceous plant that has a ripe seed capsule that will explode. The flowers are considered toxic, and should not be ingested. Once cultivated, the plant has medicinal properties to help in the treatment of warts, ringworm, nettle stings, and poison ivy rash. Additional research suggests yellow dye and shampoo for itchy scalps may be possible from this species.

== Description ==
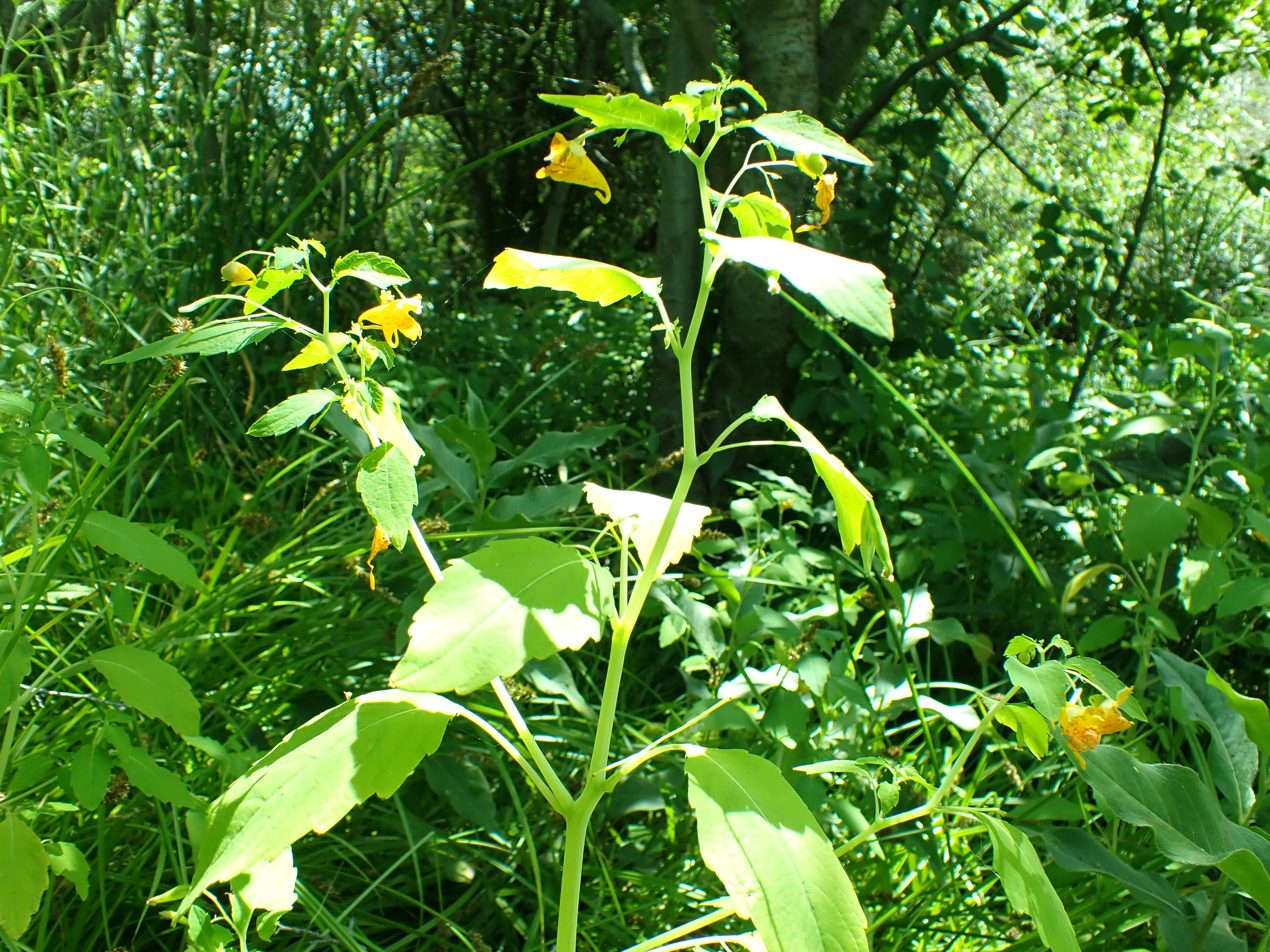
Impatiens aurella plant

Impatiens aurella grows up to approximately 460 mm (18 in) tall. The leaves grow to be 3–12 cm (1.2–4.7 in) long and the petioles are 2–4 cm (0.79–1.57 in) long. The yellow blooms (often have orange spots) are saccate sepal and approximately 1 cm (0.39 in) in length. The lateral sepals are smaller and bloom with five petals that are approximately 5–8 mm (0.20–0.31 in) in length. The flowers bloom in sets of two.

Typical of all impatiens, I. aurella has a small fruit capsule that contains up to six seeds. This fruit capsule will explode and disperse seeds around the plant, which is where the genus Impatiens gets its name.

== Habitat ==
This species of Impatiens is found in North America in the northwest United States from central Alaska to Washington, Idaho, Montana, and British Columbia, Canada.

Impatiens aurella is known to grow in tall vegetation and cattails. It is typically surrounded by wetland habitats such as marshes, drainage ditches, and lakeshores in the interior cedar hemlock. It prefers organic soil, and will grow in both disturbed and undisturbed locations. Interestingly, the species rarely appears in abundance.

== Conservation ==
The conservation status of I. aurella is listed as least concern. Despite not growing in large bunches, the annual flower shoots seeds that can allow new plants to grow in future years.

In order to conserve the habitat for I. aurella, avoid development in areas with known growth and protect wetland habitats to create optimal growth conditions.
