= Impatiens halongensis =

Scientific classification
- Kingdom: Plantae
- Clade: Tracheophytes
- Clade: Angiosperms
- Clade: Eudicots
- Clade: Asterids
- Order: Ericales
- Family: Balsaminaceae
- Genus: Impatiens
- Species: I. halongensis

Binomial name
- Impatiens halongensis Kiew & T.H.Nguyên

Species of flowering plant

Impatiens halongensis is a species in the family Balsaminaceae, native to Vietnam. It was collected in Hạ Long Bay in 1999, which is how the species got its name.

== Description ==
Impatiens halongensis grows as a perennial plant. Its lanceolate leaves are dark green above and measure up to 10.5 centimetres (4 in) long. The flowers are white, with yellow edges that are sometimes tinged with green.

== Distribution and habitat ==
Impatiens halongensis is endemic to Vietnam, where it is confined to the islands of Hạ Long Bay, a UNESCO World Heritage Site. Its habitat is in limestone soil.
