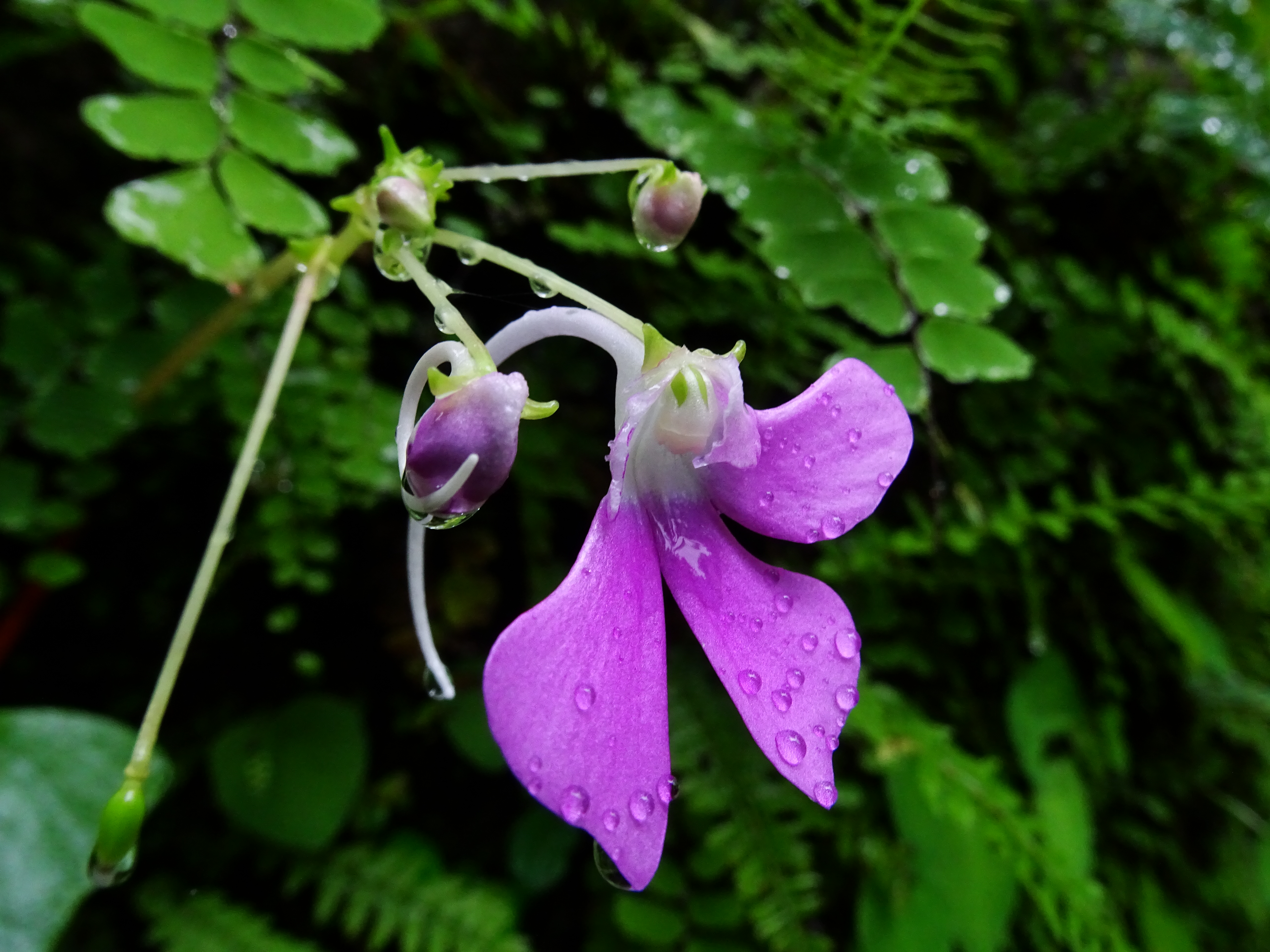

Scientific classification
- Kingdom: Plantae
- Clade: Tracheophytes
- Clade: Angiosperms
- Clade: Eudicots
- Clade: Asterids
- Order: Ericales
- Family: Balsaminaceae
- Genus: Impatiens
- Species: I. acaulis

Binomial name
- Impatiens acaulis Arn.

= Impatiens acaulis =

Species of flowering plant

Impatiens acaulis is a species of flowering plant in the family Balsaminaceae. The species is endemic to most of India and Sri Lanka.

Two varieties are accepted:

- Impatiens acaulis var. acaulis Arn.
- Impatiens acaulis var. granulata Bhaskar, Razi & Yogan.
