= Impatiens wilsoni =

Conservation status
- Endangered (IUCN 3.1)

Scientific classification
- Kingdom: Plantae
- Clade: Tracheophytes
- Clade: Angiosperms
- Clade: Eudicots
- Clade: Asterids
- Order: Ericales
- Family: Balsaminaceae
- Genus: Impatiens
- Species: I. wilsoni

Binomial name
- Impatiens wilsoni Hook.f.

Species of flowering plant

Impatiens wilsoni is an endangered species of flowering plant in the family Balsaminaceae. It is endemic to China, where it is known only from Sichuan.

This species grows up to half a meter tall. The inflorescence is a raceme of 4 to 10 large, white flowers.

The plant grows in moist, shady habitat, such as forest understory.
