= Impatiens frithii =

Conservation status
- Endangered (IUCN 3.1)

Scientific classification
- Kingdom: Plantae
- Clade: Tracheophytes
- Clade: Angiosperms
- Clade: Eudicots
- Clade: Asterids
- Order: Ericales
- Family: Balsaminaceae
- Genus: Impatiens
- Species: I. frithii

Binomial name
- Impatiens frithii Cheek

Species of flowering plant

Impatiens frithii is a species of flowering plant in the family Balsaminaceae. It is endemic to Cameroon, where it has been found in the Bakossi Mountains and on Etinde, part of Mount Cameroon. It is an epiphyte growing on small trees and shrubs in elfin forest habitat. It is small and inconspicuous when not bearing its bright red flowers.
