= Little Mount Cameroon =

Small mountain in southwest Cameroon

Coordinates: 4.0731°N 9.1158°E

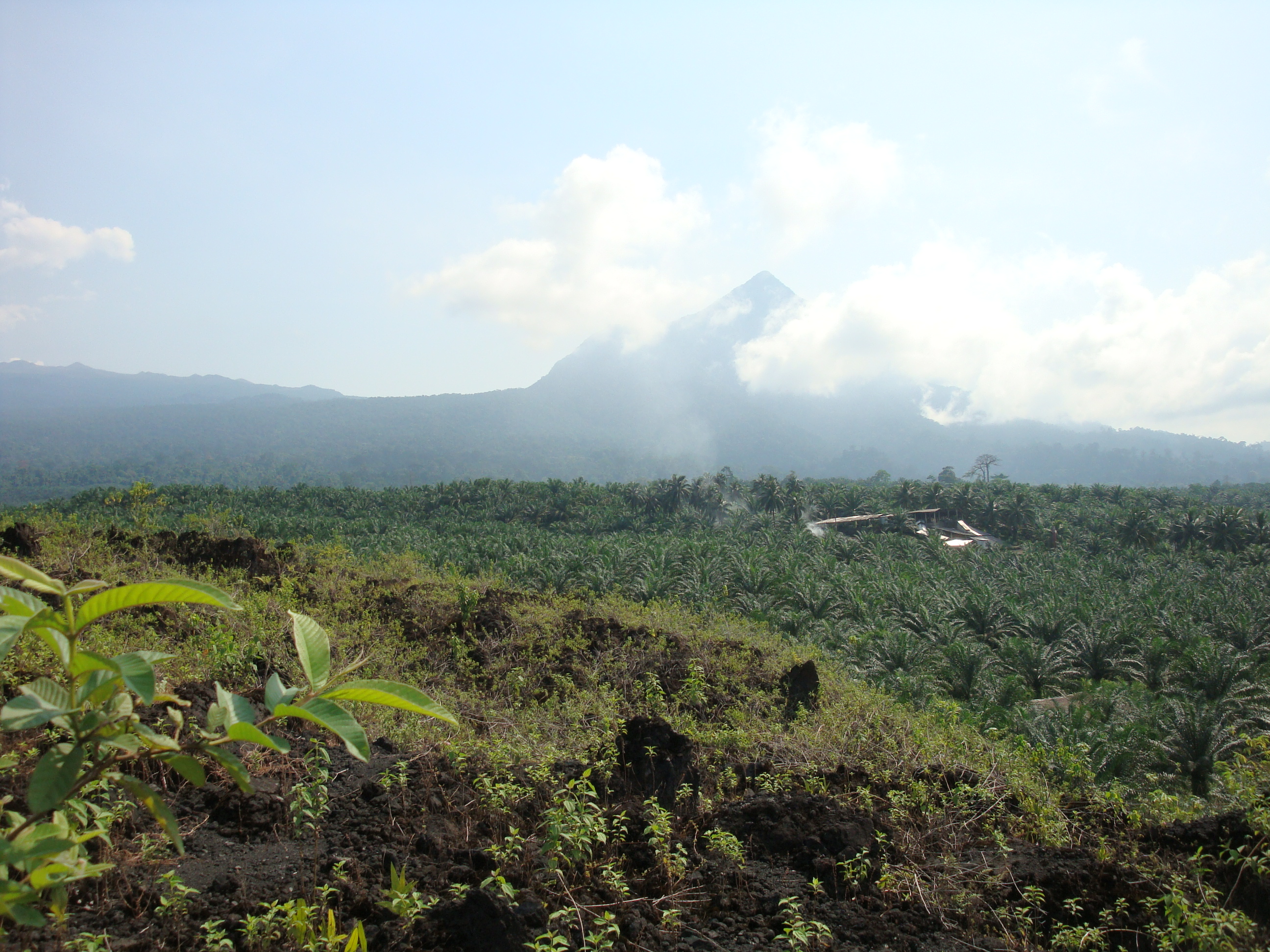
Little Mount Cameroon (Etinde) from lava flow, Idenau Road, near Limbe, Cameroon

Little Mount Cameroon, also known as Etinde, is a 1,713 m (5,620 ft) peak on the southern flank of Mount Cameroon. It is a subvent stratovolcano of the larger volcano nearby.
