= Mount Cameroon Race of Hope =

Annual footrace in Cameroon

The Mount Cameroon Race of Hope (in French, "La Course de l'Espoir") is an annual, televised footrace held at Mount Cameroon in the Southwest Region of Cameroon in January or February. The 20th edition of the Guinness Mount Cameroon race of hope was scheduled for 14 February 2015. The information was made public in a joint press conference granted by the president of the Cameroon Athletics Federation, Emmanuel Motomby Mbome, and the General manager of Guinness Cameroun, Baker Magunda.

During the Press Conference it was made known that the mode of registration and price (10 million FCFA) remain the same but there will be several innovations this year notably the Olympic flame that would go round the country prior to the race.

The flame of hope will visit every qualifier race notably in Ngaoundere, then move to Batie, Bamenda, Yaounde, Douala, and finally Buea. On each lap of the tour, Guinness Cameroon will carry out some activities of general interest such as constructing water catchments, schools, and hospitals. The event begins at Molyko Sports Complex in Buea and follows a path up Mount Cameroon and back; The course runs a distance of 38 kilometers (24 mi). Participants are divided into men's and women's divisions and further subdivided into professionals, youth, and casual runners. Each winner in the men's and women's professional divisions will receive 10,000,000 francs CFA in 2011. Teams may enter the race and compete in the relay division. The first Race of Hope was in 1995. Since then, participation has steadily increased; there were 214 participants in 2005, 390 in 2006, and 643 from nine countries in 2007. As of 2010, the winners since the race's inception had all been Cameroonians. Sarah Etonge has won the women's division for four straight years.

The first race took place in 1973. For many years, the race was organised and sponsored by Guinness under the name Guinness Mount Cameroon Race. In 2005, control of the event was taken by 12 local committees in Buea and representatives of the national Cameroon Athletics Federation (CAF) and the Ministry of Sports and Physical Education. The budget in 2007 was 130 million francs CFA, the bulk of which was provided by the Ministry of Sports and Physical Education. The change to public control was controversial: In 2005, Mayor Charles Mbella Moki of the Buea Rural Council accused the organizers of mismanagement and proposed that Guinness to be given back full control. In 2006, the CAF cut the prize money to the winners by 25% without warning, reportedly to cover their membership fees in the organisation.

About 5,000 visitors come to Buea each year to view the race. Cultural and sporting events take place in Buea. These include artists, choral groups, and dancers; and basketball, handball, and volleyball tournaments. Local authorities sanction the event through the paramount chief of Buea, who climbs Mount Cameroon to petition the gods for their blessing.

The 2007 documentary film Volcanic Sprint is about the race.

The 2019 race saw marginal attendance due to the ongoing Anglophone Crisis.

During the 2023 edition, nineteen athletes were injured when small bombs exploded during the race.

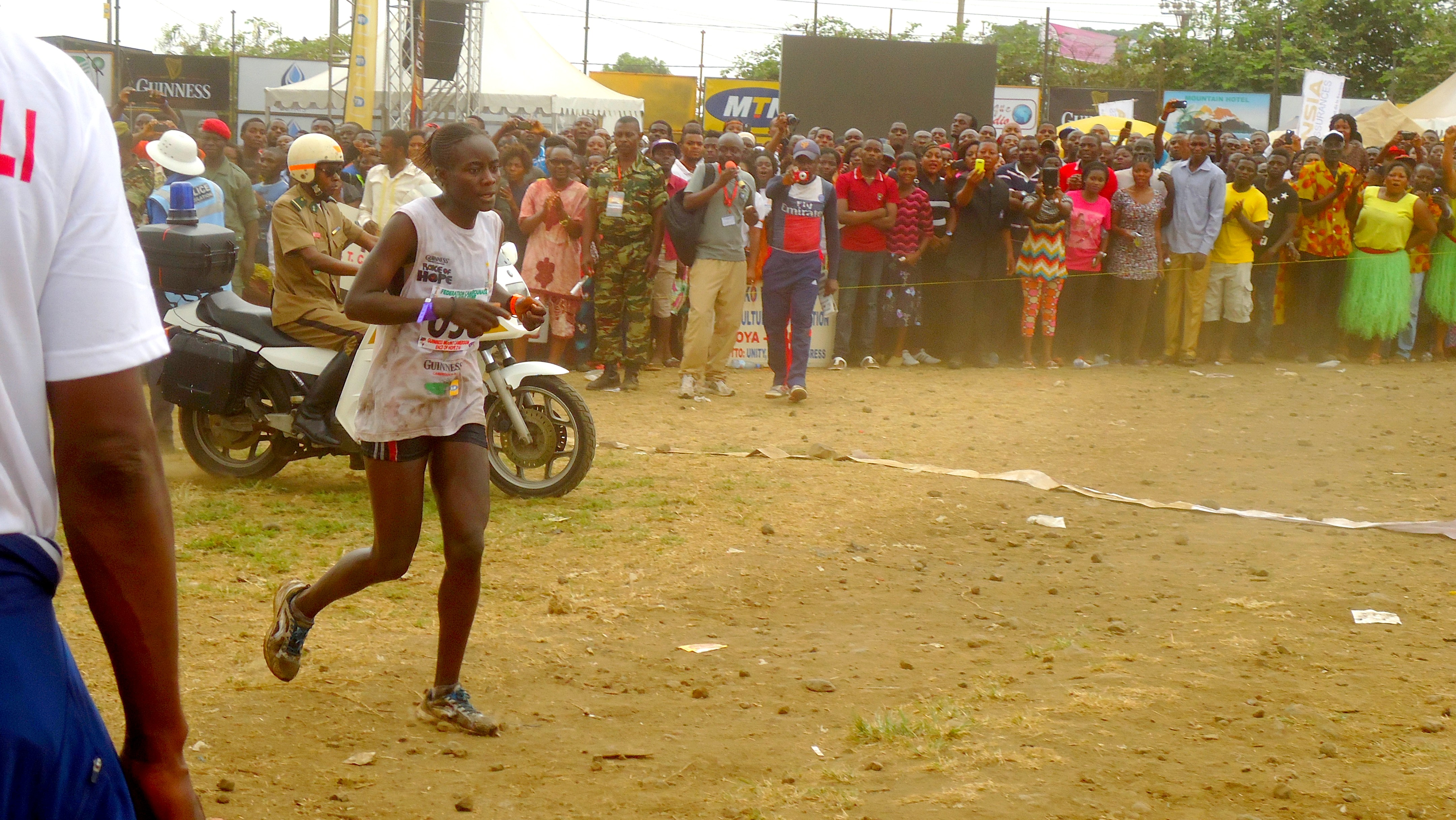
Female athlete during mt Cameroon race of hope at few meter to the finish line

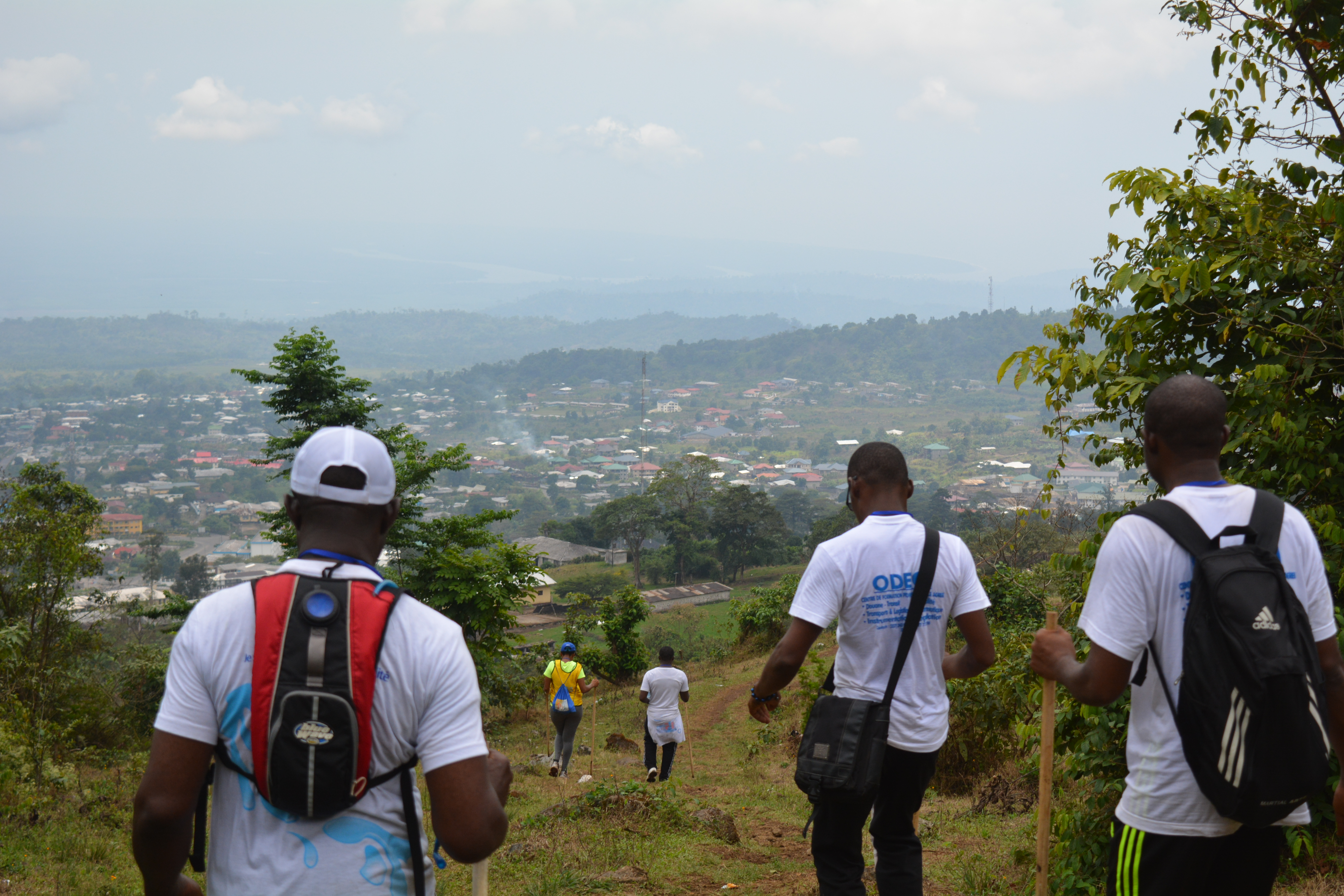
