= Volcanic Sprint =

- Produced by: Steve Dorst and Dan Evans
- Release date: 2007

Volcanic Sprint is a 2007 documentary film produced by Steve Dorst and Dan Evans about a grueling mountain race in Africa and the mostly local competitors who compete against tough odds to overcome dire poverty.

== Synopsis ==
Volcanic Sprint is a documentary film about the Mount Cameroon Race of Hope, which is located in the Southwest Province of Cameroon, in the city of Buea. The film focuses on five main competitors: Sarah Etonge, Catherine Ngwang, Max Mwambo, Dominique Tedjojem, and Bart van Doorne. During the first half of the film, it cuts between footage of the athletes with their families, at work, and training. The second half of the film covers the race itself, starting at the Molyko Sport Complex, going up to the summit of Mount Cameroon, and back down again. Volcanic Sprint debuted at the 2007 Globians Film Festival in Berlin, Germany.

== See also ==
- Mount Cameroon Race of Hope
- Sarah Etonge
