= Sarah Etonge =

Cameroonian fell runner

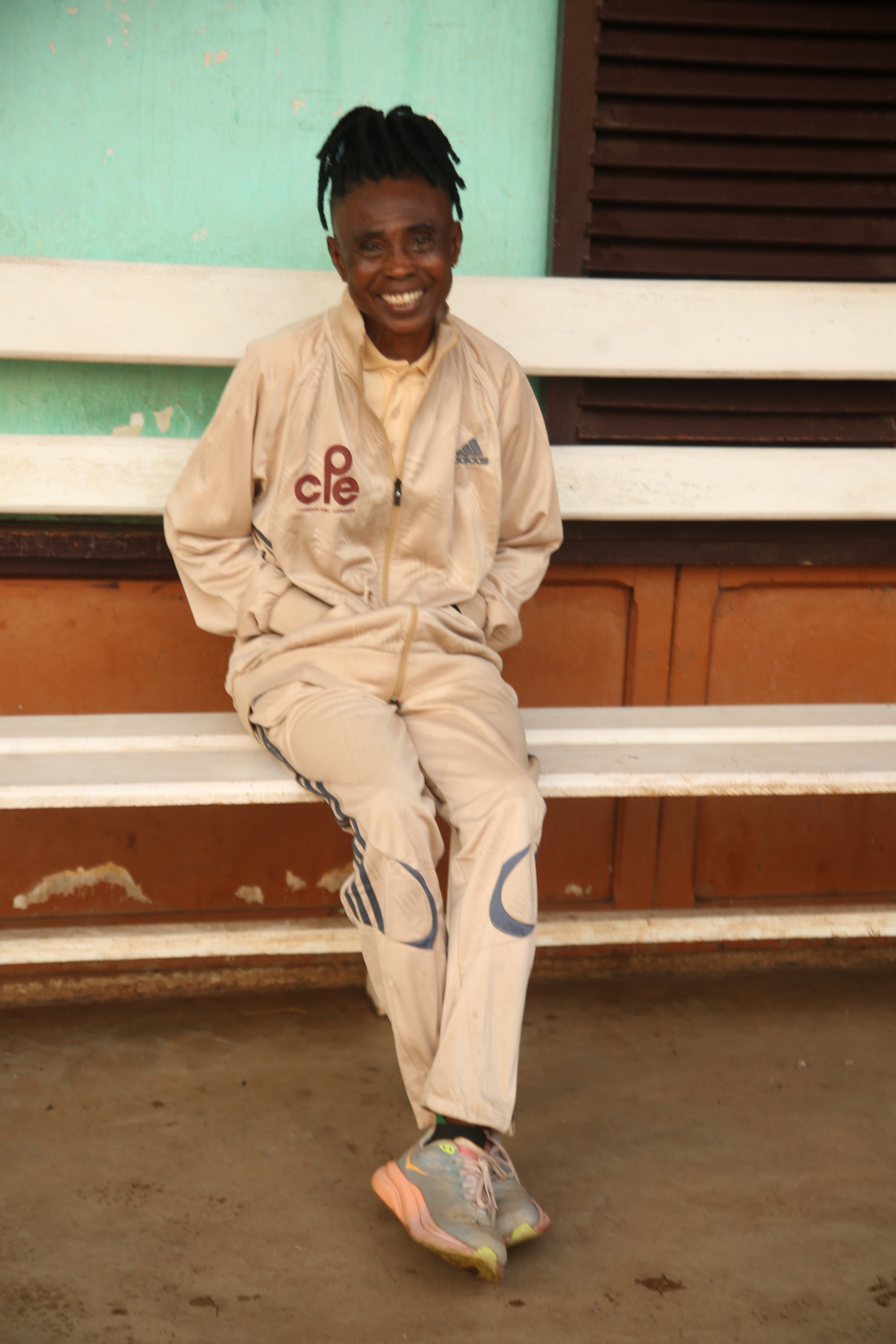

Personal information
- Full name: Sarah Liengu Etonge
- Nickname: Queen of the Mountain
- Nationality: Cameroonian
- Born: February 19, 1967 (age 59) Buea, Cameroon

Sport
- Sport: Long-distance running
- Events: Mountain running, Marathon

Sarah Liengu Etonge (born 19 February 1967) in Buea, Southwest Province, Cameroon is a Cameroonian fell runner and marathon athlete, widely celebrated as the “Queen of the Mountain.” She is best known for her dominant performances in the annual Mount Cameroon Race of Hope, which she won seven times, making her the only woman ever to secure the title to date. Her 2005 championship came in February, finishing with a time of 5 hours 38 minutes 06 seconds.

On 12 March 2005, Etonge was awarded an honorary doctorate degree in mountaineering by Professor Emeritus Lydia Luma of the Cameroon Education Corporation.

In 2006, the city of Buea unveiled a statue in her honour. It was the second municipal statue ever constructed in the city, and the first since that of Otto von Bismarck.

== Early life ==
Etonge was born and raised in Buea, Etonge left school early because of financial hardship and married at a young age, becoming a mother by age 14. Widowed while still struggling to raise seven children, she turned to athletics in her late twenties to provide for her family.

== Career and achievements ==
Etonge began competing in the Mount Cameroon Race of Hope around age 27, securing her first win in 1996 over the 38 km course around Mount Cameroon. She went on to win four consecutive races from 1996 to 1999, earning the unique title “Queen of the Mountain,” a distinction never awarded to any other competitor, male or female. She has won the women’s professional division a total of seven times, with her most recent victory in 2005, recorded at 5:38:06.

The race, held annually in Buea, spans about 38 km, starting at Molyko Sports Complex, climbing to Mount Cameroon’s summit (~4,040 m), and returning. It is considered one of Africa’s toughest mountain races, attracting both local and international participants.

== Honours and legacy ==
On March 12, 2005, Professor Emeritus Lydia Luma of the Cameroon Education Corporation awarded Etonge an honorary doctorate in mountaineering. In 2006, the city of Buea unveiled a statue in her honor the second municipal statue erected there, and the first since that of Otto von Bismarck.

Beyond her racing success, Etonge’s achievements helped lift her family out of poverty. Prize money, once around 1.5 million CFA francs (~US $3,000) for first place, supported her seven children, improving their education and stability. She was later recognized by Cameroon’s First Lady Chantal Biya for her contributions among notable Cameroonian women. Organizers also pledged to build her a home in Buea, with the cornerstone laid by national sports officials.

In February 2013, after a multi-year break due to personal tragedy, Etonge returned to the Race of Hope and finished second at age 46, earning prizes and symbolic acknowledgment.

== Cultural impact ==
Etonge has been acknowledged as a notable figure in Cameroon’s sporting history. Her career was highlighted in the 2007 documentary film Volcanic Sprint, which follows athletes competing in the Mount Cameroon Race of Hope.
