= Impatiens etindensis =

Conservation status
- Endangered (IUCN 3.1)

Scientific classification
- Kingdom: Plantae
- Clade: Tracheophytes
- Clade: Angiosperms
- Clade: Eudicots
- Clade: Asterids
- Order: Ericales
- Family: Balsaminaceae
- Genus: Impatiens
- Species: I. etindensis

Binomial name
- Impatiens etindensis Cheek & Eb.Fisch.

Species of flowering plant

Impatiens etindensis is a species of flowering plant in the family Balsaminaceae. It is endemic to Cameroon, where it is known only from Mount Cameroon. It grows as an epiphyte on trees in mountain forest habitat.
