= Impatiens grandisepala =

Conservation status
- Critically Endangered (IUCN 3.1)

Scientific classification
- Kingdom: Plantae
- Clade: Tracheophytes
- Clade: Angiosperms
- Clade: Eudicots
- Clade: Asterids
- Order: Ericales
- Family: Balsaminaceae
- Genus: Impatiens
- Species: I. grandisepala

Binomial name
- Impatiens grandisepala Grey-Wilson

Species of flowering plant

Impatiens grandisepala is a species of flowering plant in the family Balsaminaceae. It is endemic to Cameroon, where it is known only from Mount Cameroon. It has been collected only once, in 1979. It is an epiphyte that grows in shady mountain forest habitat.
