= Mount Cameroon =

Active volcano in Cameroon near the Gulf of Guinea

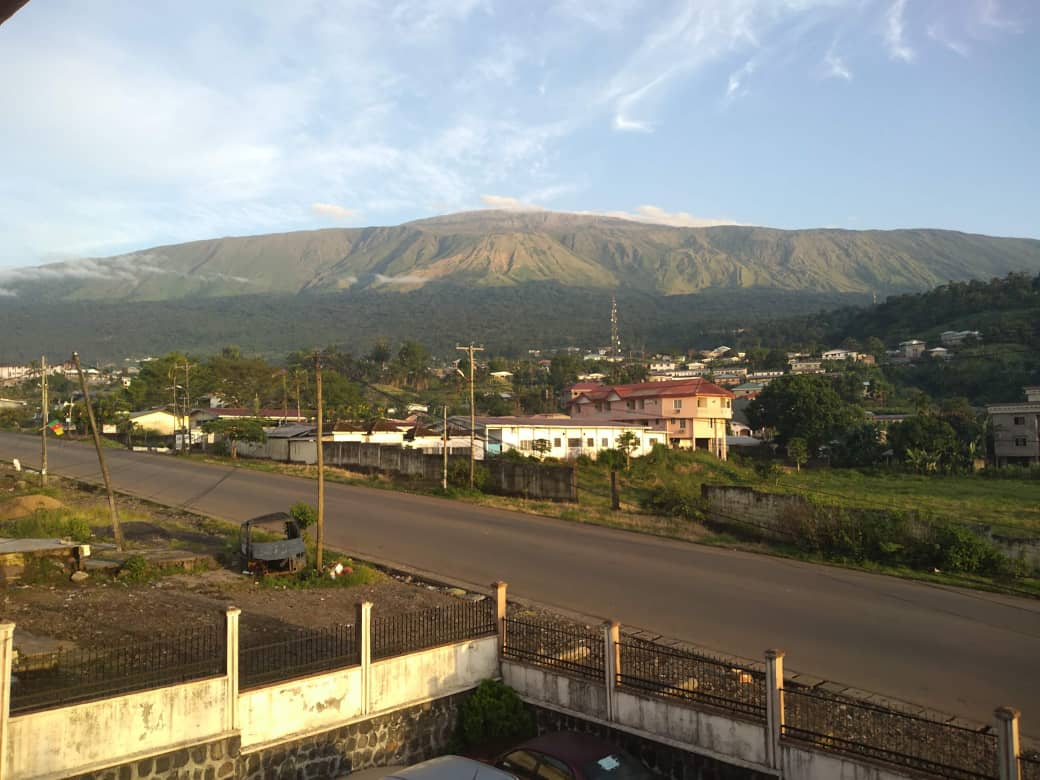
- Mount Cameroon from Buea

Highest point
- Elevation: 4,040 m (13,250 ft)
- Prominence: 3,901 m (12,799 ft); Ranked 31st
- Isolation: 2,338 km (1,453 mi)
- Listing: Country high point Ultra, Ribu
- Coordinates: 4°13′00″N 9°10′21″E

Naming
- Native name: Mongo ma Ndemi (Duala)

Geography
- Location within Cameroon
- Location: Southwest Region, Cameroon

Geology
- Mountain type: Stratovolcano
- Last eruption: February 2012

Climbing
- First ascent: Joseph Merrick, 1840s
- Easiest route: Scramble

Mount Cameroon is an active stratovolcano in the Southwest Region of Cameroon next to the city of Buea near the Gulf of Guinea. Mount Cameroon is also known as Cameroon Mountain or Fako (the name of the higher of its two peaks) or by its indigenous name Mongo ma Ndemi ("Mountain of Greatness"). Mount Cameroon is ranked 22nd by topographic isolation.

It is the highest point in sub-Saharan western and central Africa, the fourth-most prominent peak in Africa, and 31st-most prominent in the world. The mountain is part of the area of volcanic activity known as the Cameroon Volcanic Line, which also includes Lake Nyos, the site of a disaster in 1986. The eruption of 28 April-June 1909 caused the German colonial government of Kamerun to temporarily move from Buea to Douala. The most recent eruption occurred on February 3, 2012.

== Geology ==
=== Formation ===
Mount Cameroon lies on the Cameroon Volcanic Line, a 1,600 km (990 mi) NE–SW belt of oceanic and continental volcanoes stretching from Pagalu Island in the Gulf of Guinea to northern Cameroon. The volcano forms an elliptical stratovolcano about 50 km × 35 km with a volume of roughly 1,200 km^{3}. It sits on a horst of Precambrian granite and gneiss overlain by Cretaceous to Quaternary sediments. The summit is cut by several tectonic axes, notably the Debundscha axis (N60–70°), Limbe axis (N140–150°) and Batoke axis (N30–40°), inherited from basement shear zones. Gravity and wavelet-analysis studies reveal dense mantle intrusions rising into the crust and suggest that the Tiko and Ekona faults focus magma ascent to depths of at least 25 km. Differences in mantle signature between the eastern and western flanks of the volcano support a mantle origin for the Cameroon Volcanic Line.

=== Age ===
Radiometric dating of volcanoes along the Cameroon Volcanic Line shows ages ranging from about 51.8 million years to the present. Mount Cameroon is the youngest and only presently active volcano on the line. Historical records document major eruptions in 1909, 1922, 1925, 1954, 1959, 1982, 1999, 2000 and 2012. A 1922 flank eruption sent lava to the Atlantic coast and the 1999 eruption came within 200 m (660 ft) of the sea.

=== Lava chemistry ===
Mount Cameroon erupts predominantly basanite and alkali basalt, with small amounts of hawaiite, mugearite and camptonite. Xenoliths of dunite, wehrlite and clinopyroxenite in some strombolian cones indicate additions from the mantle and lower crust. Petrographic studies of the 1999 and 2000 eruptions show that the lavas are basanites containing roughly 20–25 % phenocrysts of euhedral to sub‑hedral olivine, clinopyroxene and plagioclase. Olivine phenocrysts make up around 10 % of these lavas; clinopyroxenes classify as diopside, and plagioclase crystals range from bytownite to andesine. Compared with older Mount Cameroon lavas, the 1999 and 2000 basanites have elevated Nb and K_{2}O contents and plot on a mixing trend with the 1959 and 1982 lavas.

The February–March 1959 eruption produced basanite–hawaiite lava with a mean effusion rate of 13–18 m^{3} s^{−1} and a volume of about 3.4×10^{7} m^{3}. Geochemical analyses show early fractionation of olivine and diopside followed by Fe–Ti oxides and plagioclase, making the 1959 lavas the most fractionated of all 20th‑century Mount Cameroon lavas. Two distinct magma types were erupted from two different magma chambers. More evolved magma was erupted from vents at roughly 1,960 m elevation while more mafaic magma drained from lower vents around 1,500 m, so that the magmas did not mix.

=== Eruptive history ===
Mount Cameroon is among Africa’s most active volcanoes, with eight major eruptions during the twentieth century. The volcano has more than 100 cones and vents arranged along NE–SW fractures and experiences both sustained eruptions and brief eruptions. During in-active times, seismicity rarely exceeds magnitude 3 with depths around surface level to about 60 km (37 mi). Seismic activity intensifies before eruptions and can involve deep swarms between 20 and 55 km (12 and 34 mi).

- 1959 eruption – The February–March 1959 eruption was centered at a NW–SE fissure on the north‑eastern flank and produced a compound lava flow about 7.75 km (4.8 mi) long. Two main channels and several smaller lava flows covered roughly 4.5×10^{6} m^{2} with thicknesses of 5–12 m (16.4-40 ft). The eruption lasted about 22–30 days. The eruption produced explosive cinder cones at higher elevations and quieter spatter cones at lower elevations.
- 1982 eruption – Although not described in detail, the 1982 eruption produced basanite similar to earlier lavas; geochemical data show that early more evolved lava gave way to less evolved lava over the course of the eruption.
- 1999 and 2000 eruptions – These flank eruptions were the most recent substantial events. The 1999 eruption (28 March–22 April) and the 2000 eruption (28 May–19 June) produced basanite lavas following the NE–SW fracture system and created more than 100 cones and vents. Thermobarometry suggests that magma was stored mainly between 20 and 39 km depth, corresponding to the crust–mantle boundary, with transient shallow pockets (3–12 km) during the 1999 eruption. Short‑lived explosive outbursts occurred in 1989 and 2012 without lava emission, illustrating the complex behaviour of the magma plumbing system.
- 2012 eruption – On 3 February 2012 a brief eruption occurred at Mount Cameroon. Tourists on the mountain reported strong explosions followed by visible "flames" and ash from a vent. Cameroon state radio and television later reported that the blast lasted only a couple of seconds and lightly injured two porters and guides. The event did not produce significant lava flows. Independent petrological and geophysical work indicates magma storage mainly near the crust–mantle boundary along the Cameroon Volcanic Line, consistent with deep-sourced gas release during brief explosive episodes.

== Flora ==
The mountain's natural vegetation varies with elevation. The main plant communities on the mountain include:

- Lowland rain forest predominates on the lower slopes, from sea level to 800 metres (2,600 ft) elevation. The lowland forests are part of the Cross-Sanaga-Bioko coastal forests ecoregion. They are composed of evergreen trees with a dense canopy 25 to 30 metres (80 to 100 ft) high, with taller emergent trees rising above the canopy. Many trees have buttress roots. The forests are diverse and species-rich, with numerous lianas. Much of the lowland forest has been converted to agriculture and agroforestry, including oil palm plantations.
- Lower montane forest, also known as submontane forest or cloud forest, grows between 800 and 1,600 metres (2,600 and 5,200 ft) elevation. The lower montane forests are composed of evergreen trees, which form a 20–25-metre-high (65–80 ft) canopy that is either closed or discontinuous. There are scattered areas of meadow and scrubland, with grasses, herbs, tall herbaceous plants (including Acanthaceae), tree ferns, woody shrubs, and low trees. Frequent clouds and mists sustain profuse epiphytes, including mosses, ferns, and orchids. The lower montane forests are diverse and species-rich, with characteristic Afromontane plants and endemic species. Impatiens etindensis and I. grandisepala are herbaceous epiphytes endemic to the montane forests of Mount Cameroon. The lower montane forests, together with the higher-elevation forests, scrub, and grasslands, are part of the Mount Cameroon and Bioko montane forests ecoregion.
- Upper montane forest grows from 1,600–1,800 metres (5,200–5,900 ft) elevation. Trees up to 20 metres (65 ft) high form an open-canopied forest with numerous epiphytes. The upper montane forests are less species-rich than the lower-elevation forests, and fires are more frequent.
- Montane scrub grows between 1,800 and 2,400 metres (5,900 and 7,900 ft) elevation. Low trees of 1 to 15 metres (3 to 50 ft) form open-canopied forests, woodlands, and shrublands, with an understory of small shrubs, herbs, ferns, and climbers.
- Montane grassland occurs between 2,000 and 3,000 metres (6,600 and 9,800 ft) elevation. The dominant vegetation is tussock grasses, with scattered fire-tolerant shrubs and low trees.
- Sub-alpine grassland is found at the highest elevations, from 3,000 metres (9,800 ft) to over 4,000 metres (13,000 ft). Frost-tolerant tussock grasses, dwarf trees and shrubs, and crustose, foliose, and fruticose lichens predominate.
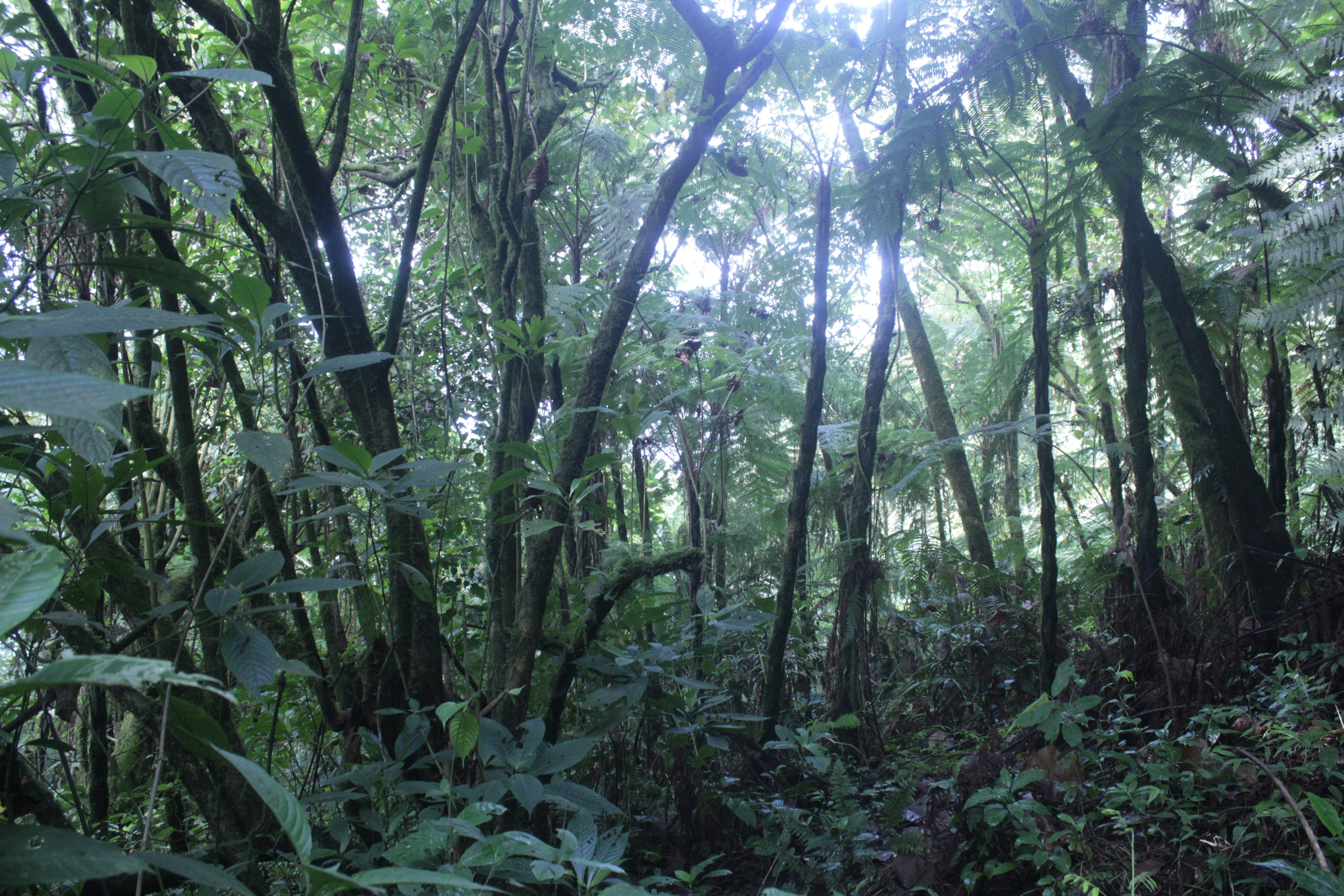
A view of the tropical rain forest on the mountain

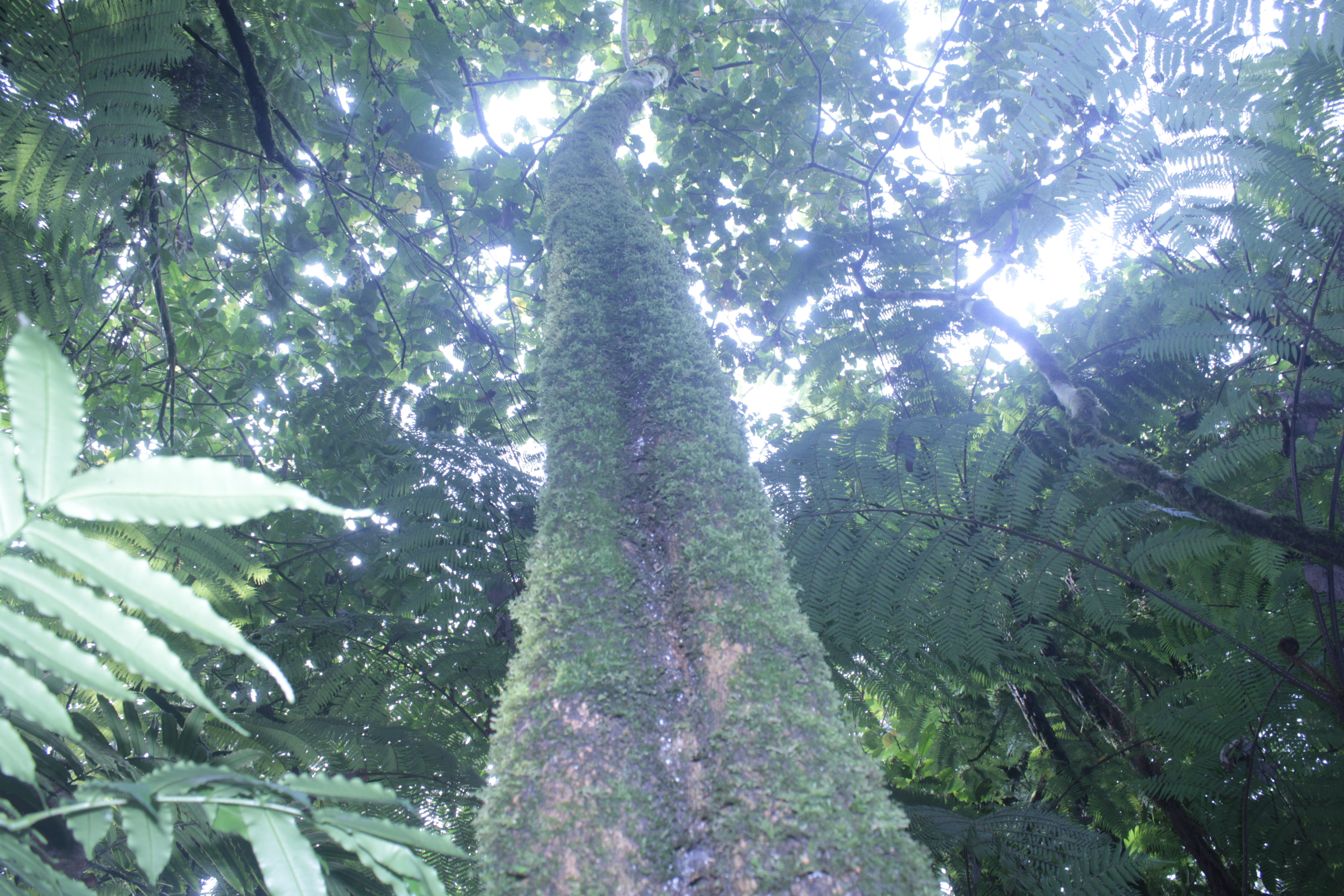
Mahogany

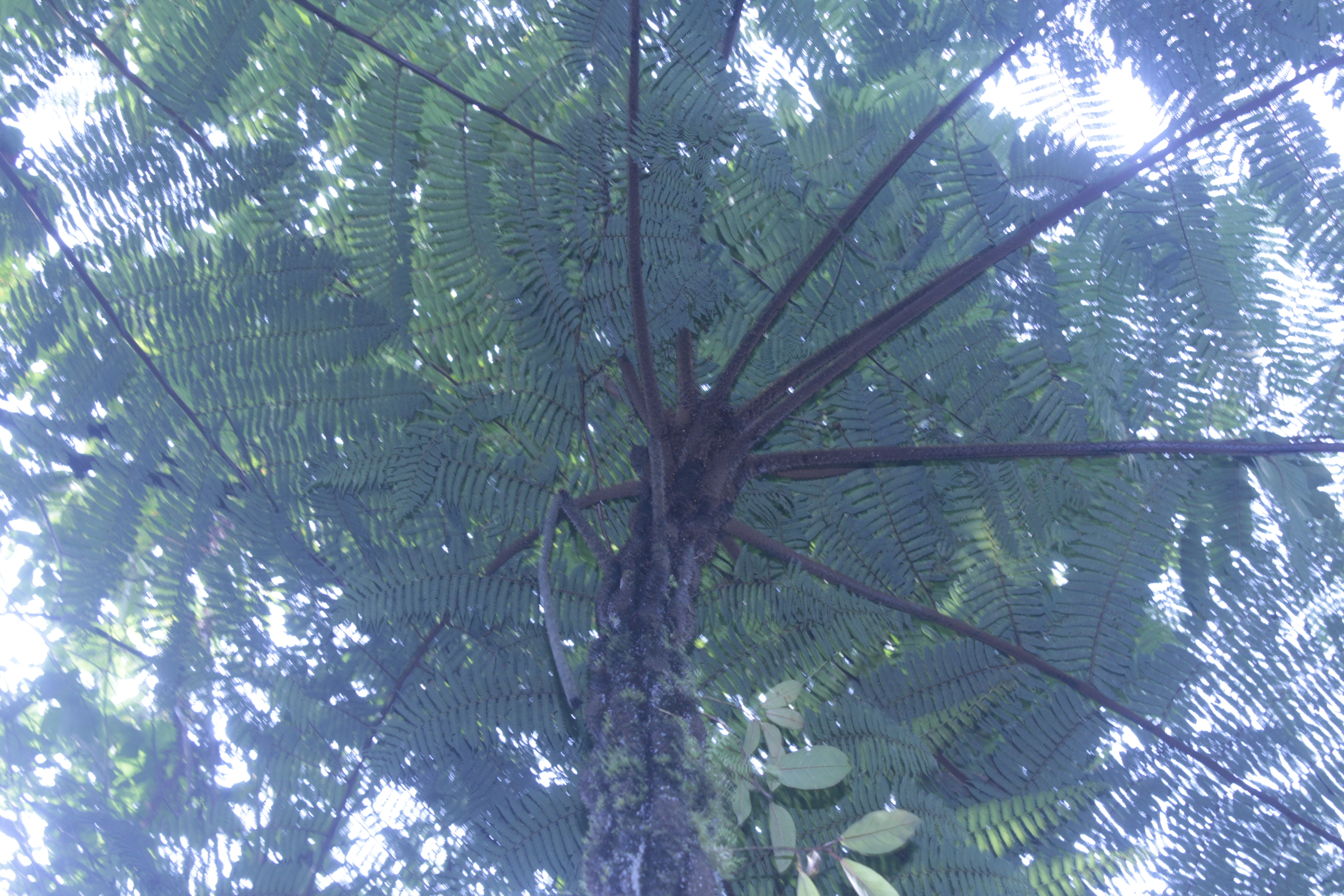
Disamara tree

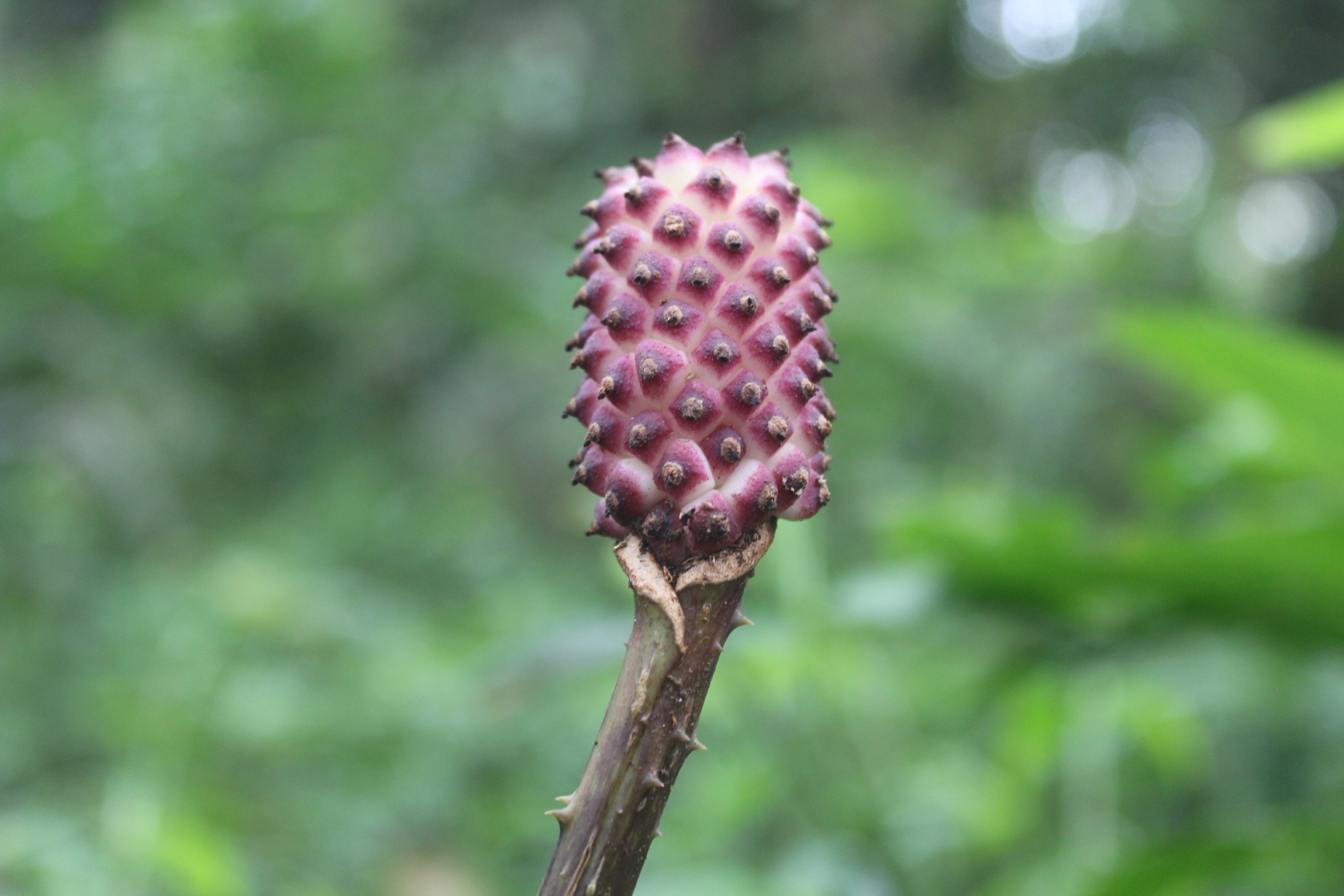
Arum plant

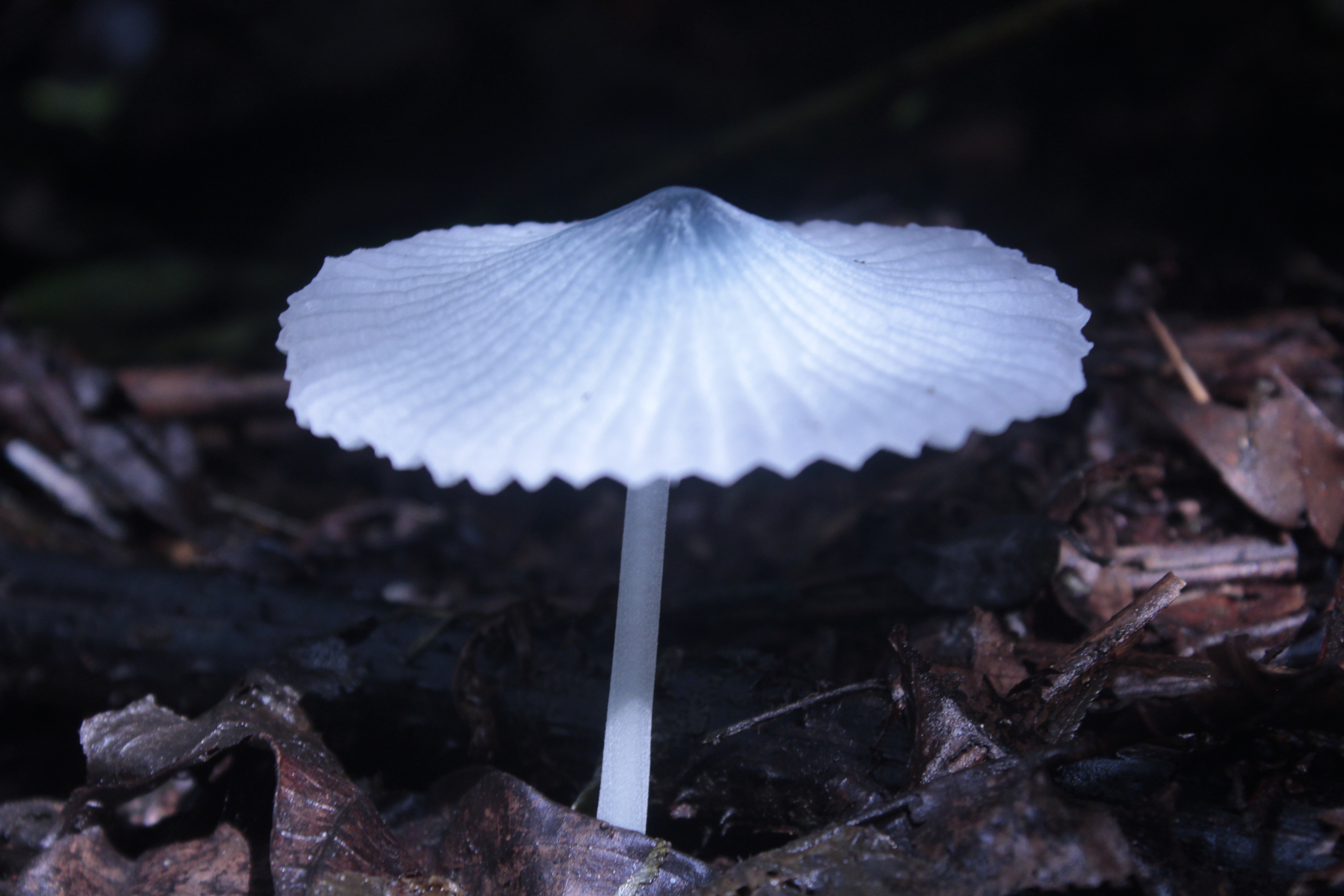
Agaricus mushroom

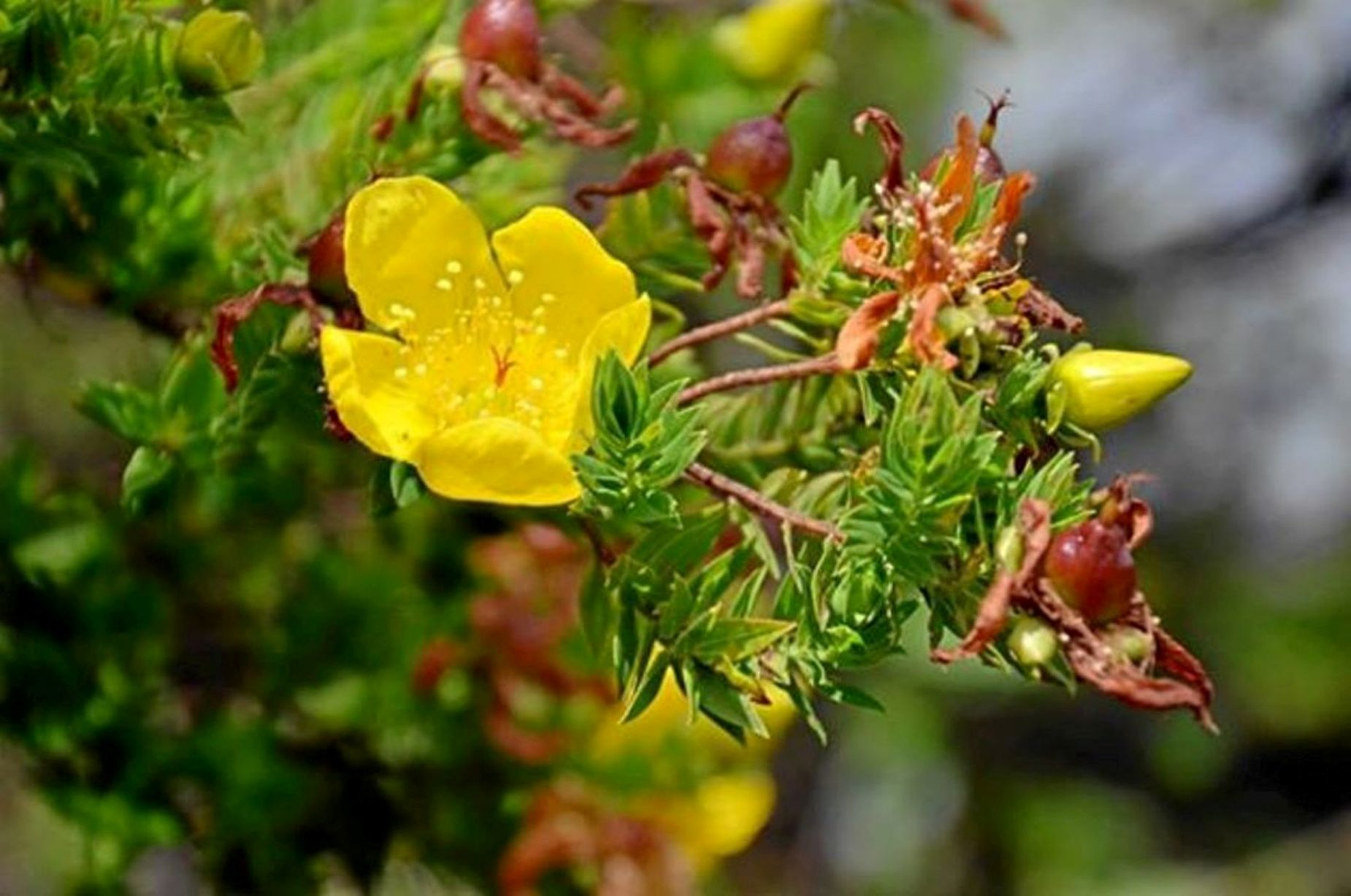
Wild flower

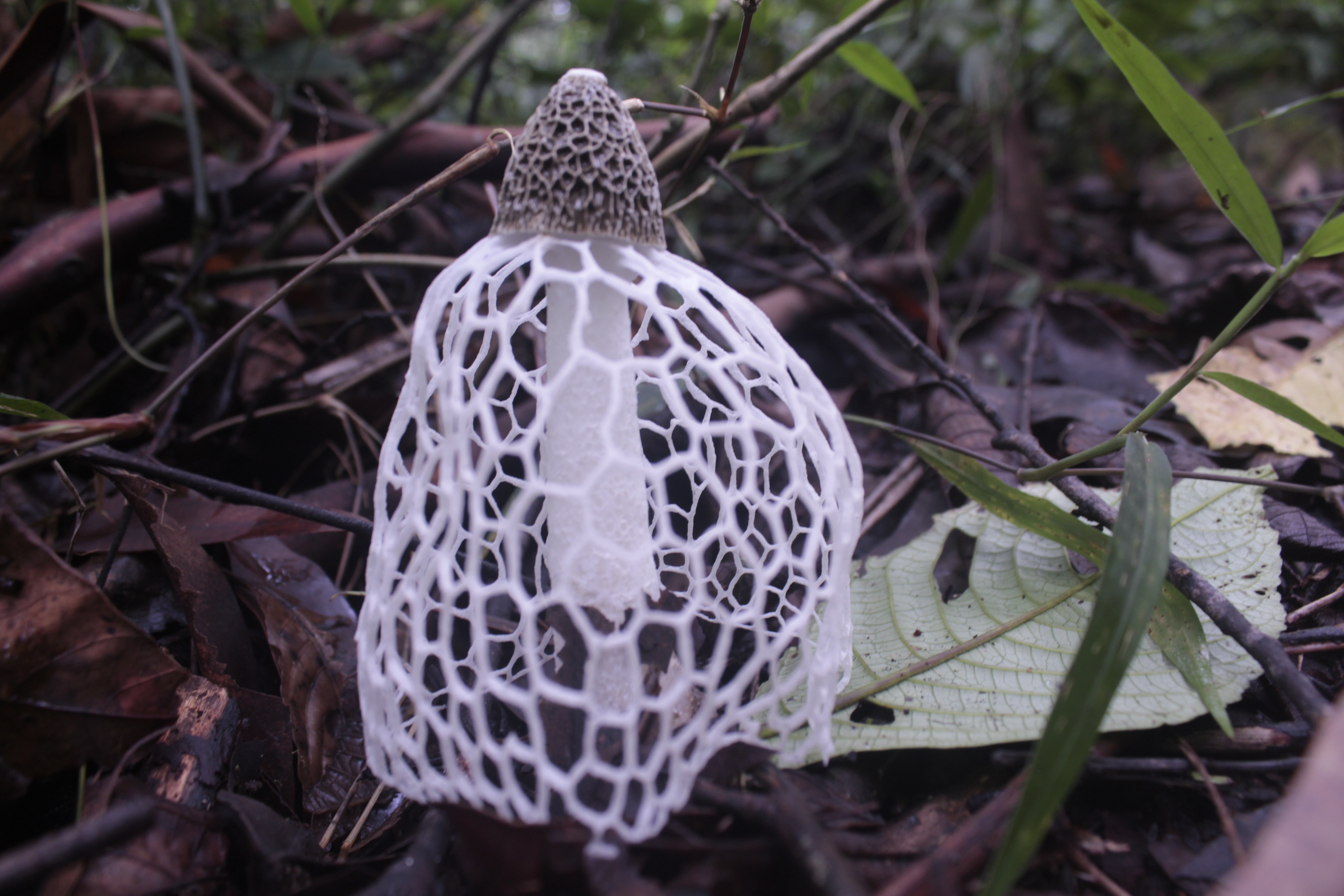
Stinkhorn mushroom

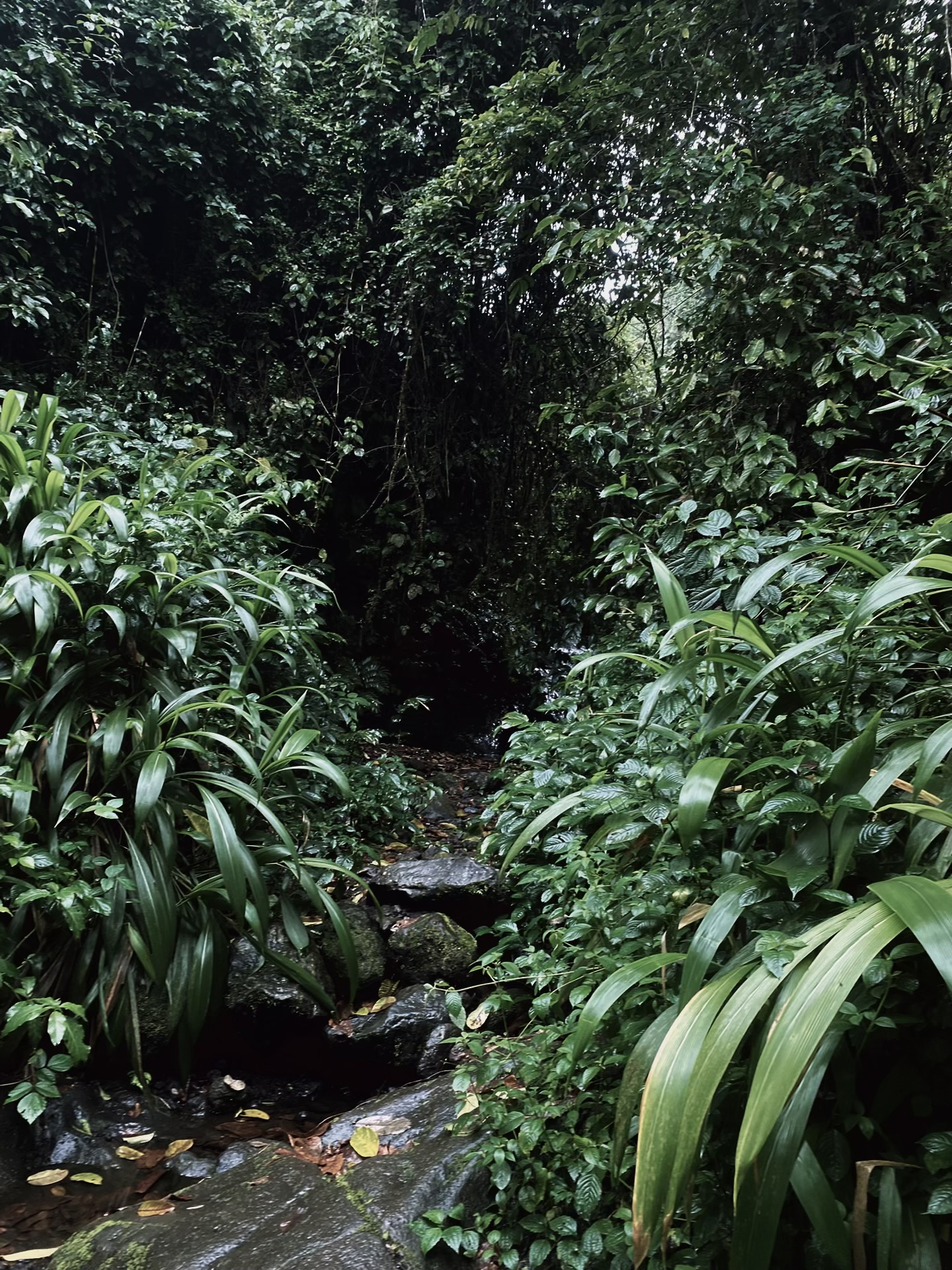
Dense vegetation

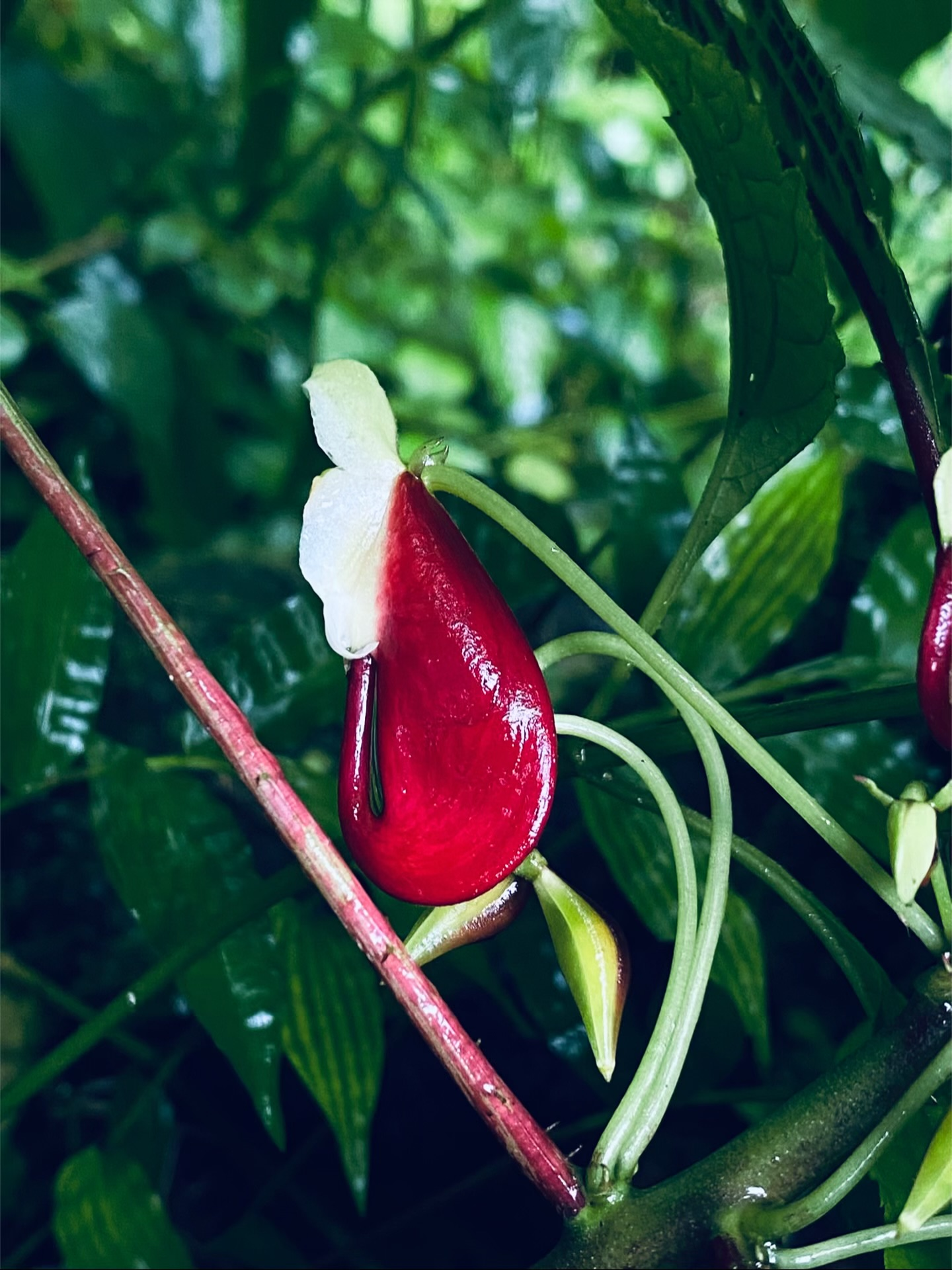
Impatiens niamniamensis

== Fauna ==
Large mammals on the mountain include the African forest elephant (Loxodonta cyclotis), with a population of over 100 individuals. Other herbivores include red river hog (Potamochoerus porcus), bushbuck (Tragelaphus scriptus), bay duiker (Cephalophus dorsalis), blue duiker (Philantomba monticola), and yellow-backed duiker (Cephalophus sylvicultor). The mountain is home to several species of primates, including chimpanzee (Pan troglodytes), drill (Mandrillus leucophaeus), red-capped mangabey (Cercocebos torquatus), putty-nosed monkey (Cercopithecus nictitans), mona monkey (Cercopithecus mona), red-eared monkey (Cercopithecus erythrotis), Preuss' guenon (Cercopithecus preussii), and crowned guenon (Cercopithecus pogonias).

Two species of birds are endemic to Mount Cameroon, Mount Cameroon spurfowl (Pternistis camerunensis) and Mount Cameroon speirops (Zosterops melanocephalus).

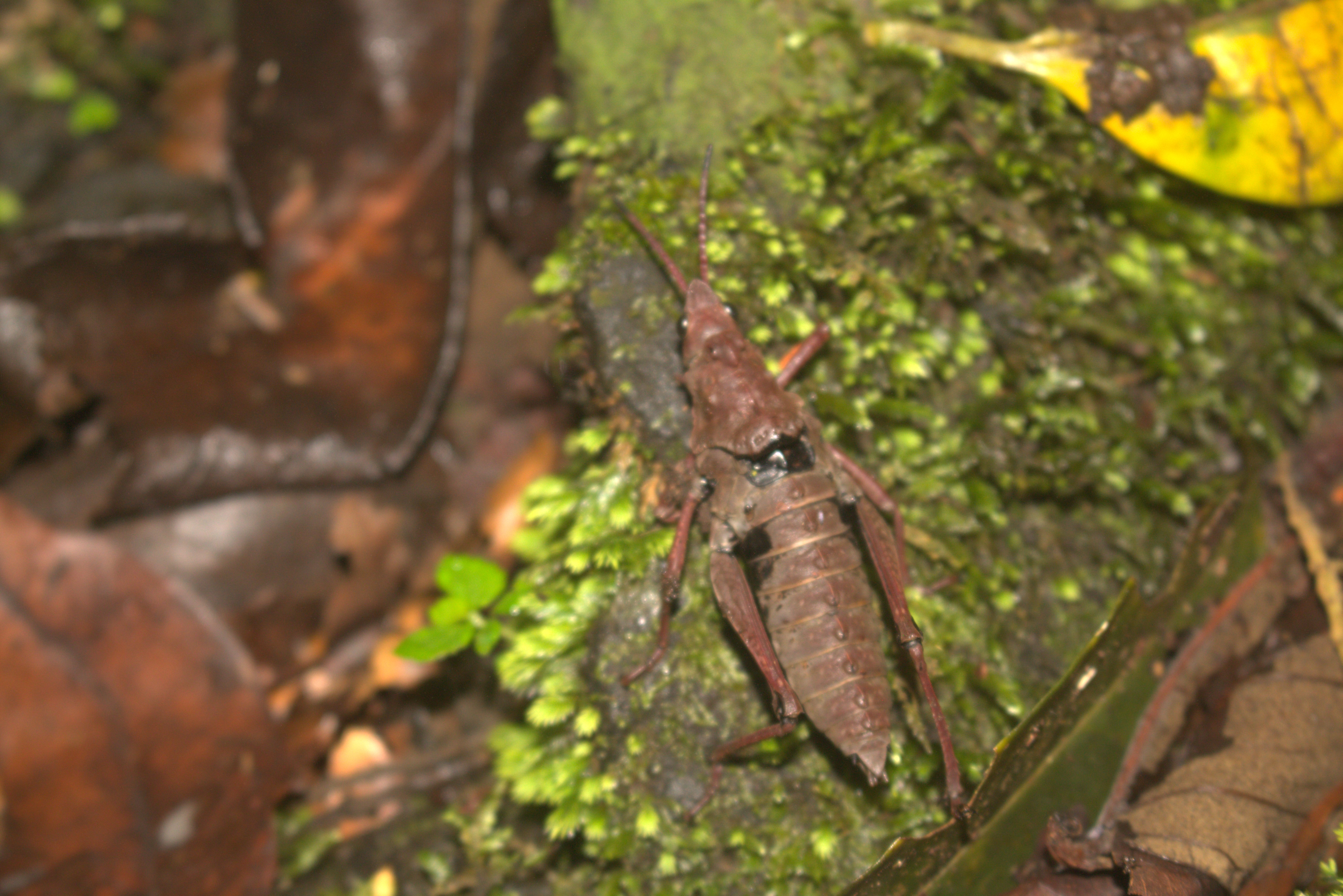
African armored ground cricket

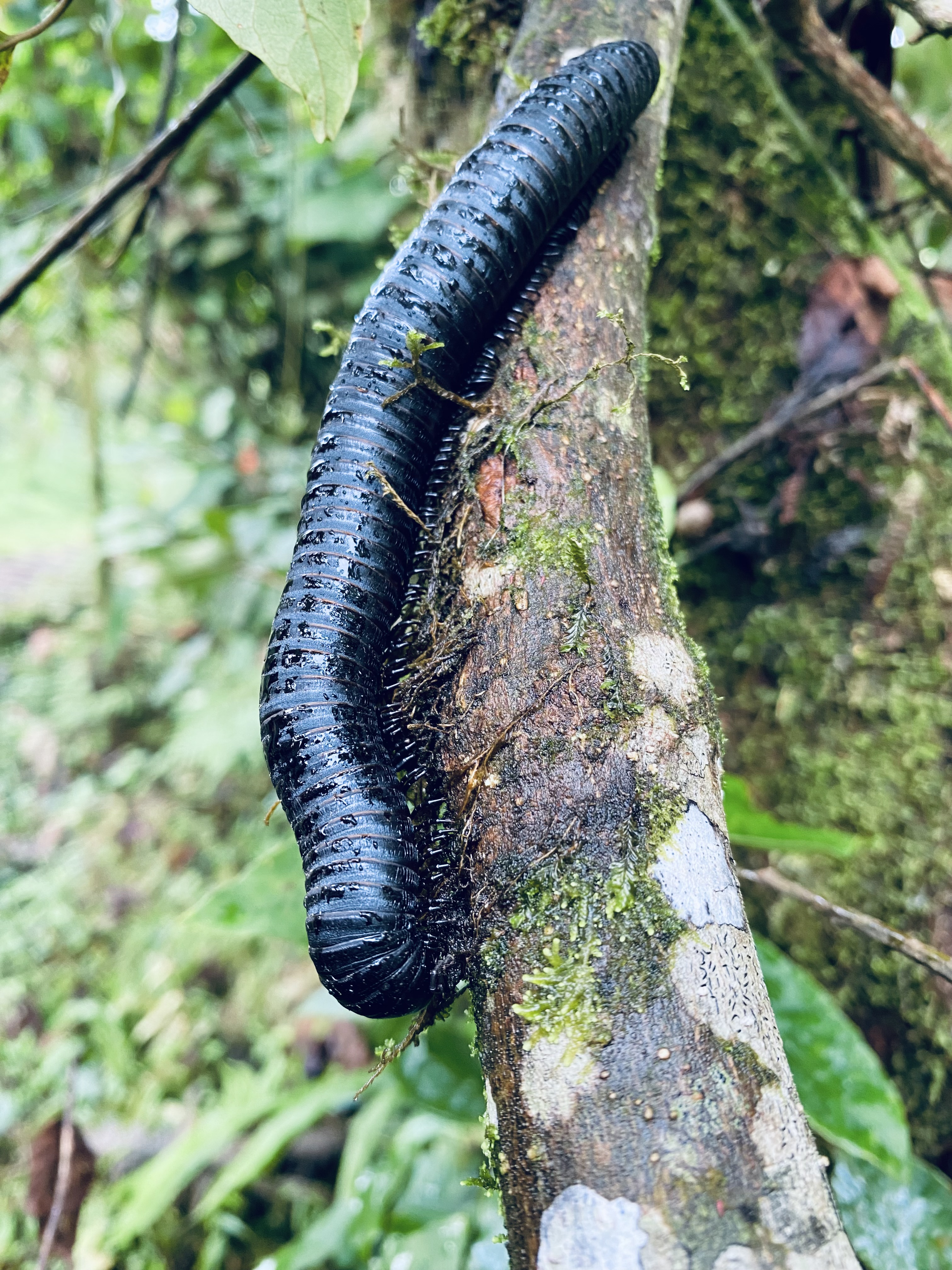
Giant African millipede, Archispirostreptus gigas

== Mount Cameroon National Park ==
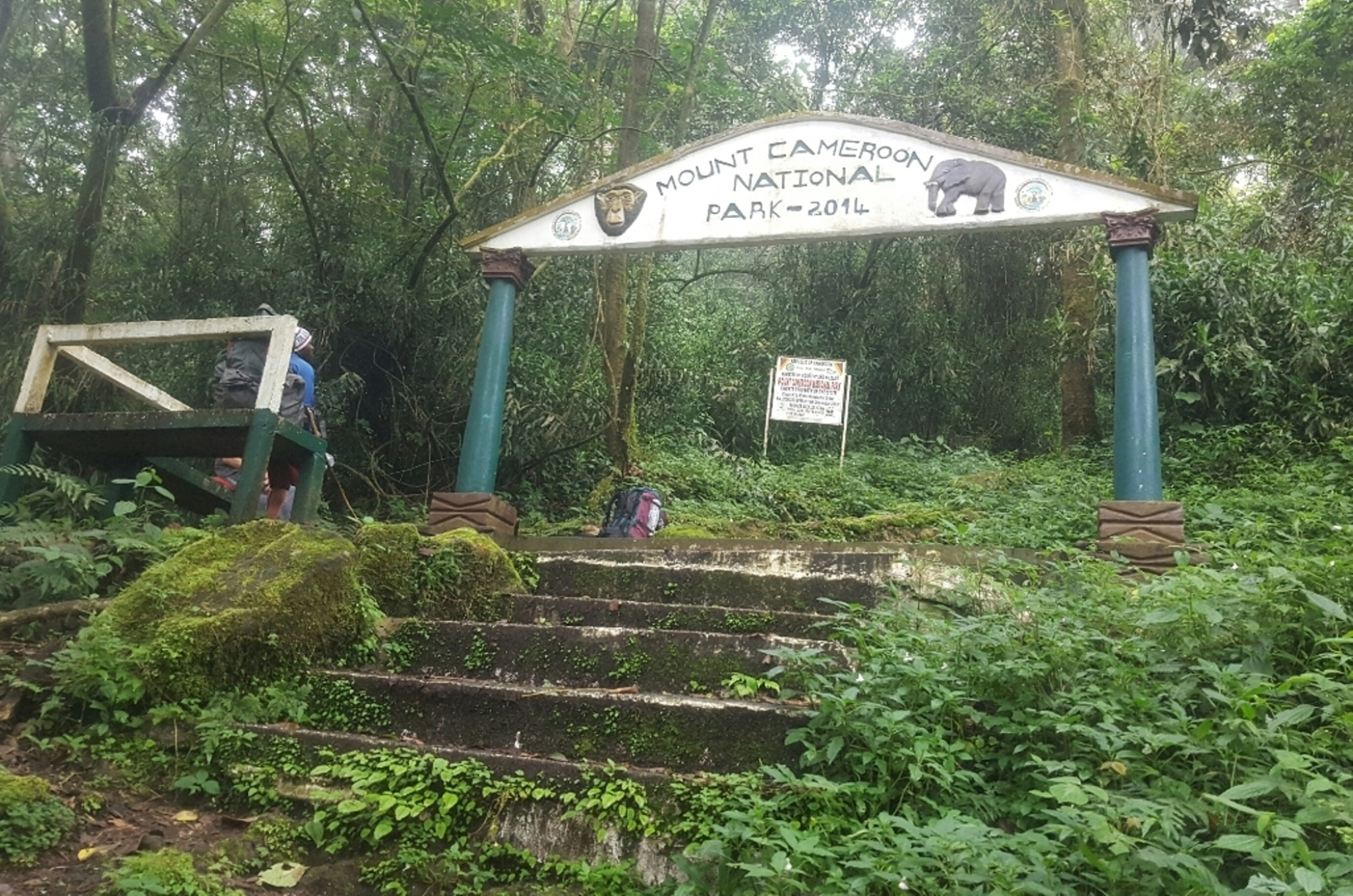
Entrance to the Mt Cameroon National park situated in Buea, south west region

Mount Cameroon National Park (Parc National du Mont Cameroun) was created in 2009. It covers an area of 581.23 km^{2} (224.41 sq mi). The park includes the former Etinde Forest Reserve and most of the Bomboko Forest Reserve. A portion of the Bomboko Forest Reserve remains outside the park, on the lower northern slopes of the mountain.

== IUGS geological heritage site ==
In respect of it being 'one of the few volcanoes in the world located at the ocean-continent boundary in a passive tectonic margin', the International Union of Geological Sciences (IUGS) included 'The Quaternary Cameroon Volcano' in its assemblage of 100 'geological heritage sites' around the world in a listing published in October 2022. The organisation defines an IUGS Geological Heritage Site as 'a key place with geological elements and/or processes of international scientific relevance, used as a reference, and/or with a substantial contribution to the development of geological sciences through history.'

== Access ==
The peak is frequently ascended by hikers. The annual Mount Cameroon Race of Hope scales the peak in around 4 1/2 hours. Sarah Etonge has won the race seven times and is also a tour operator. English explorer Mary Kingsley, one of the first Europeans to scale the mountain, recounts her expedition in her 1897 memoir Travels in West Africa.

== Gallery ==
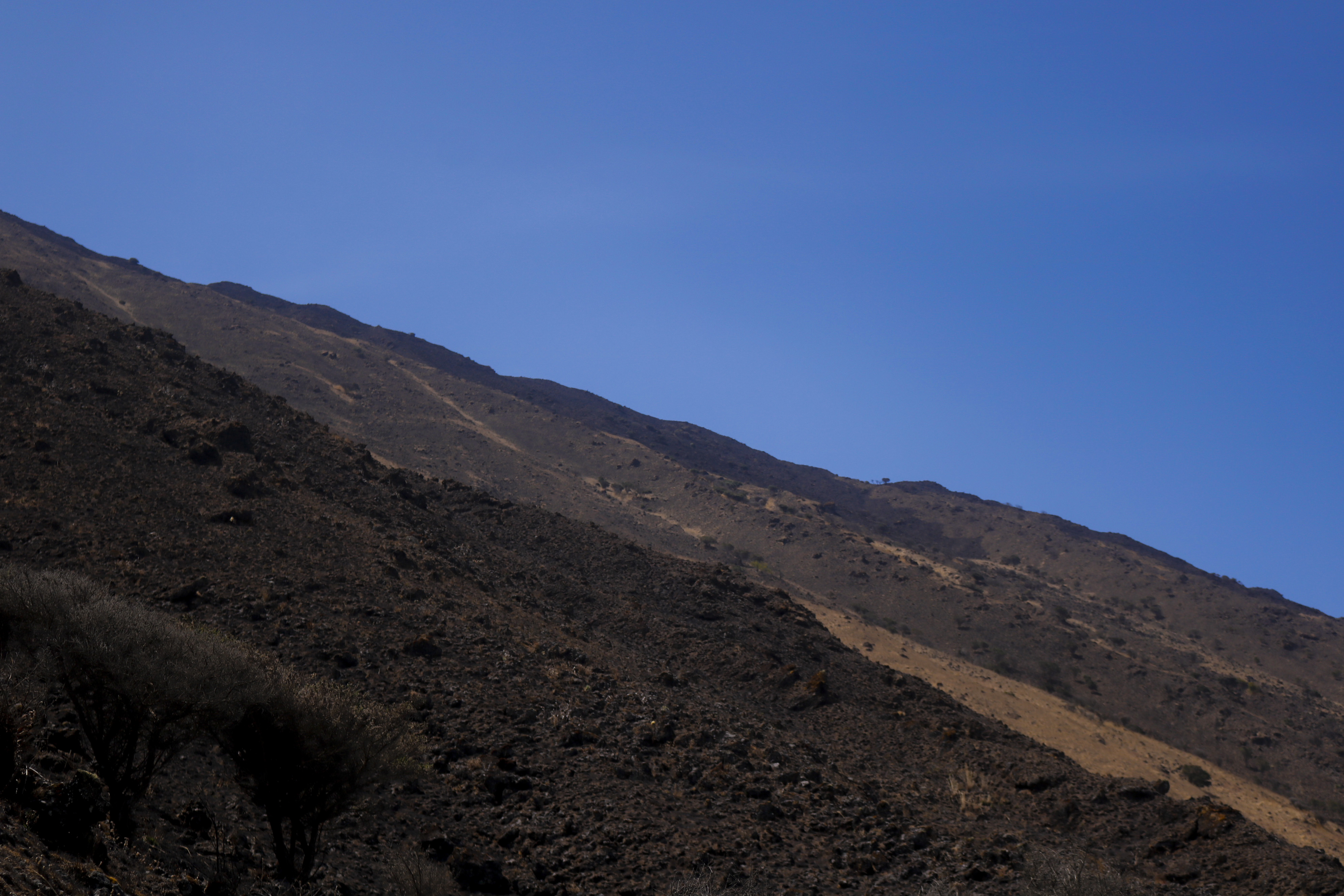
Mount Fako, left view

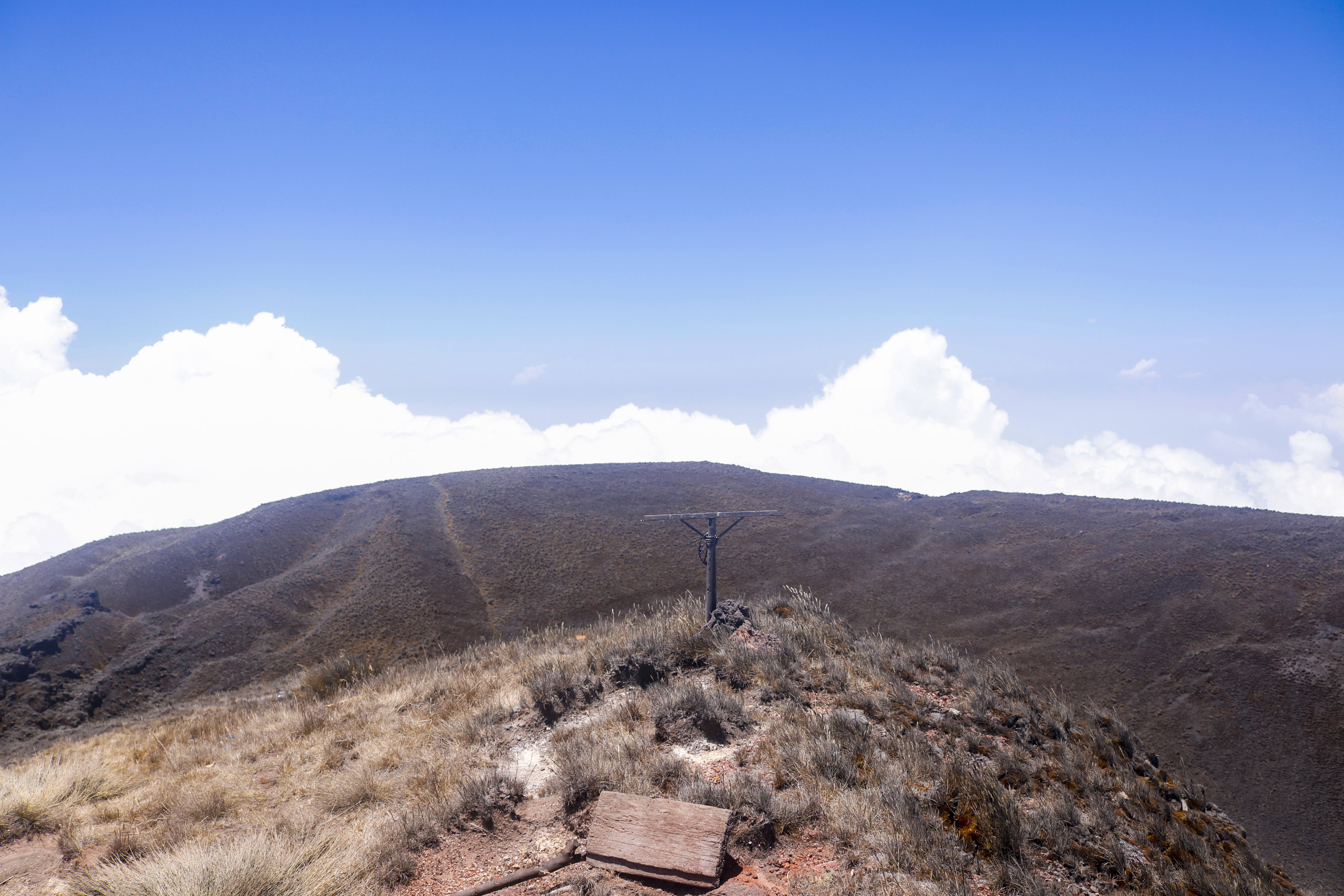
Top view at Mount Fako

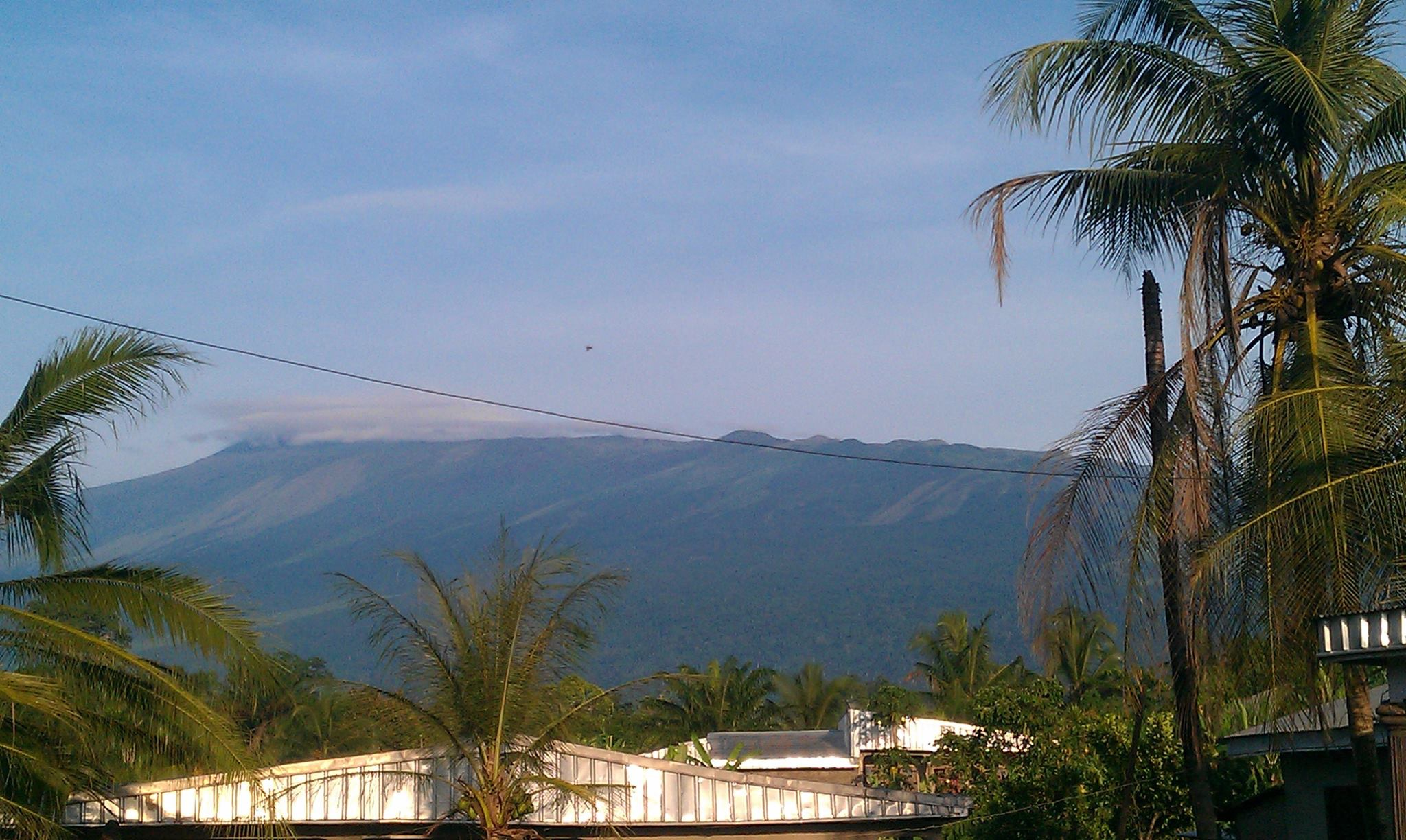
Mount Fako

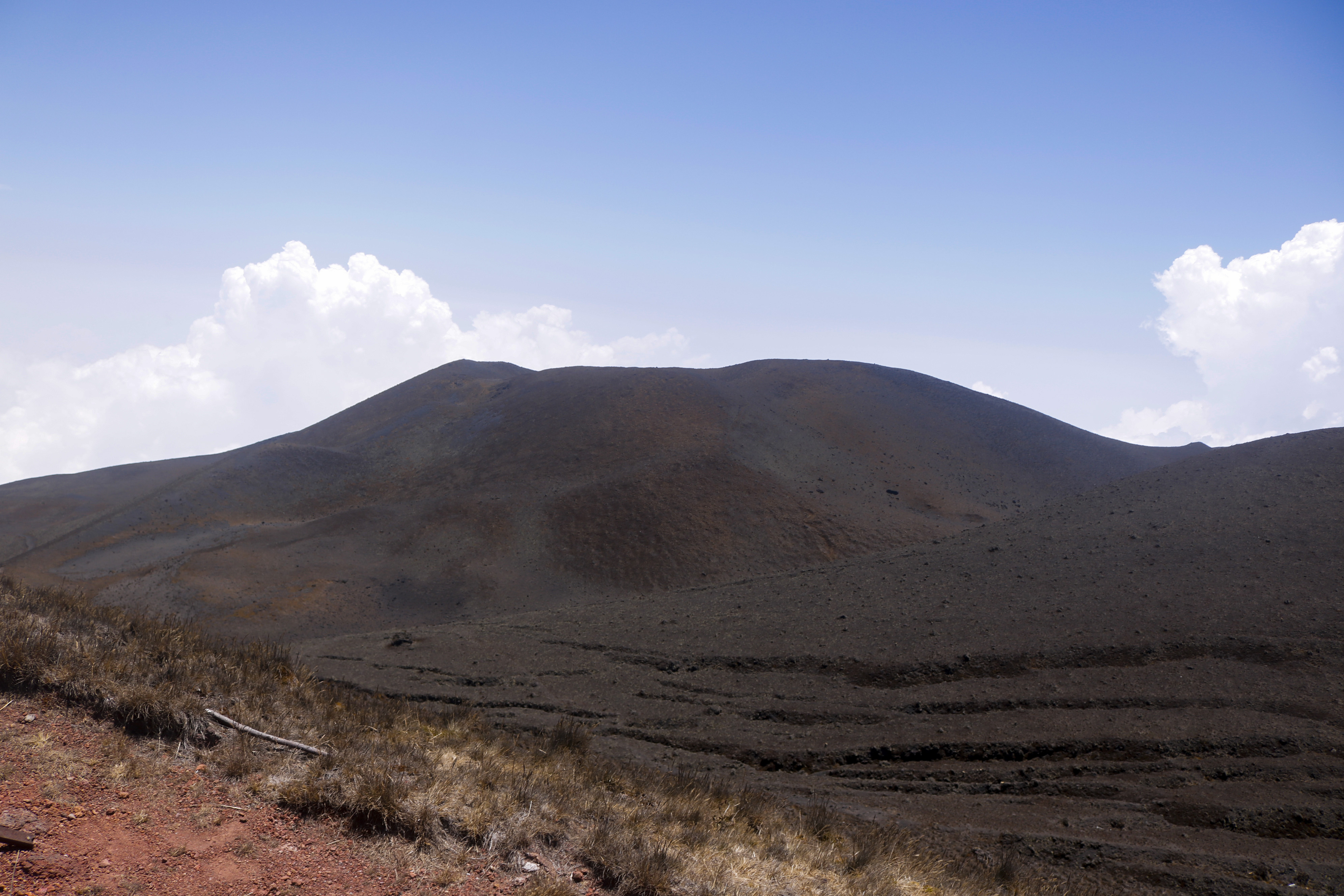
Summit at mount Cameroon

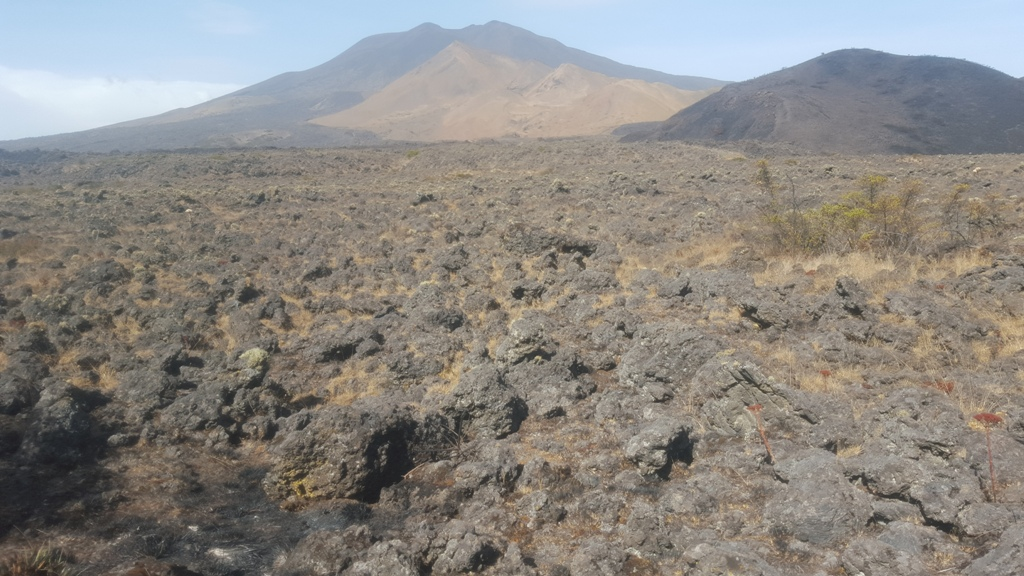
Landscape of Mount Cameroon

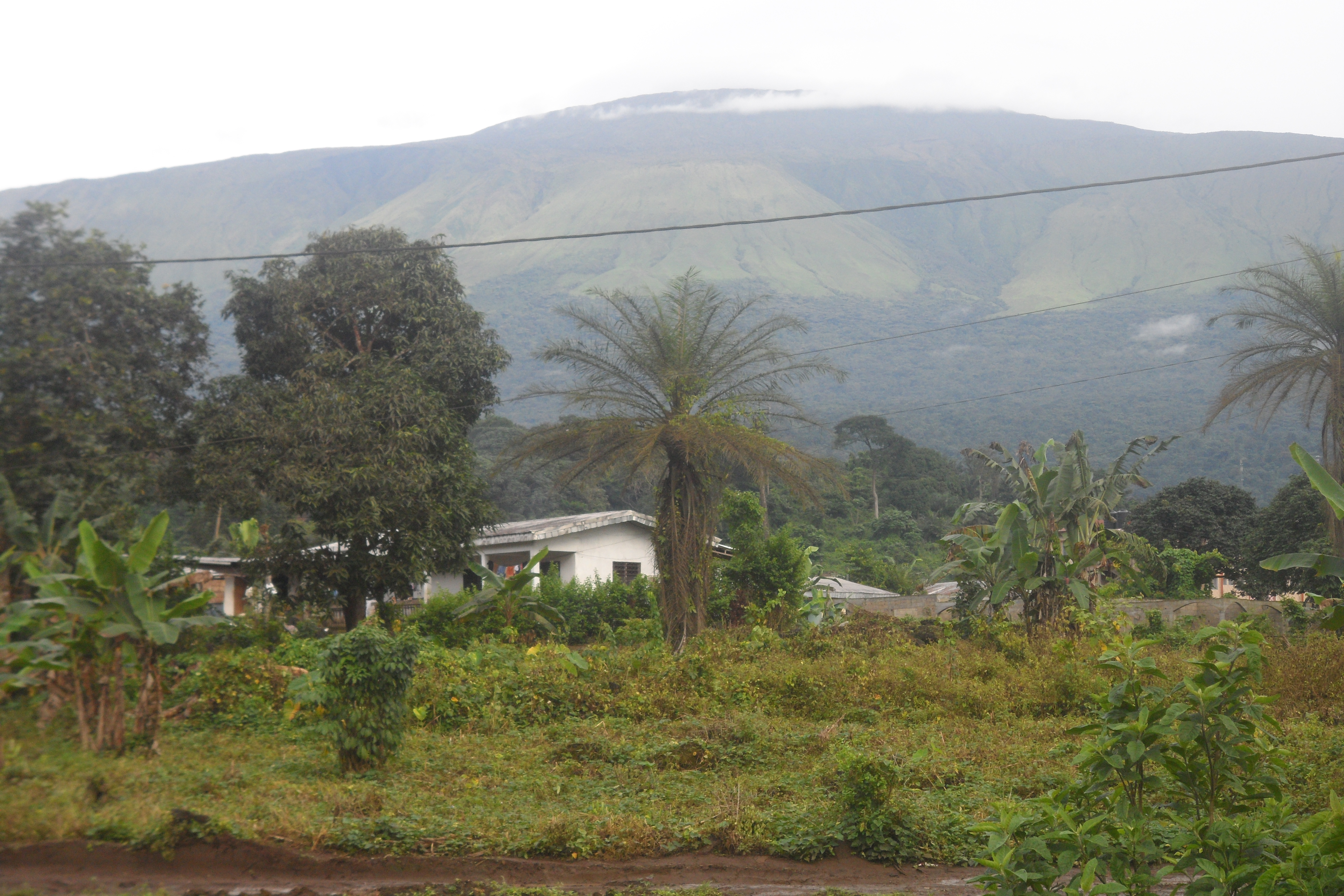
View of the mountain from the base

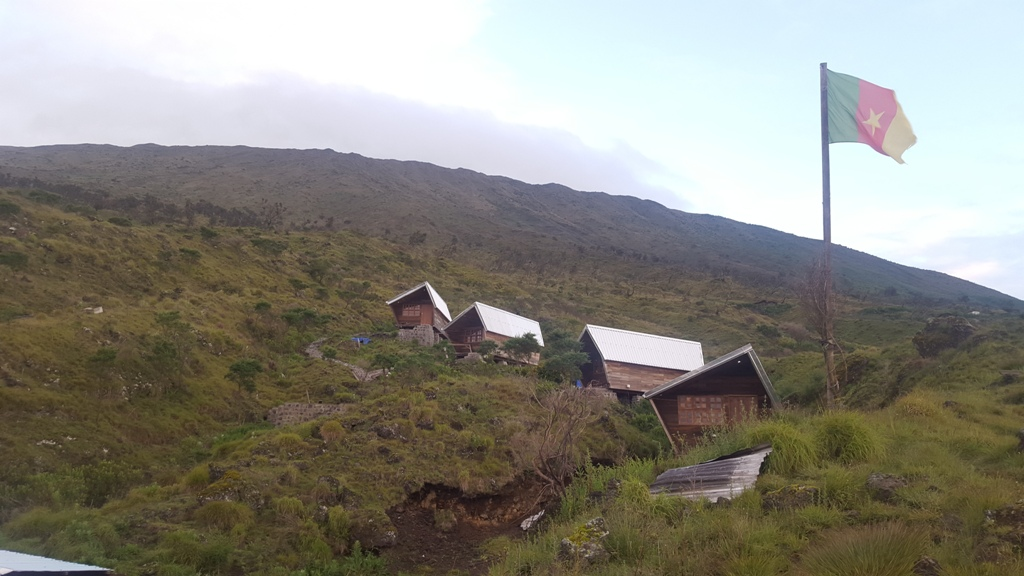
Accommodation facilities on Mount Fako

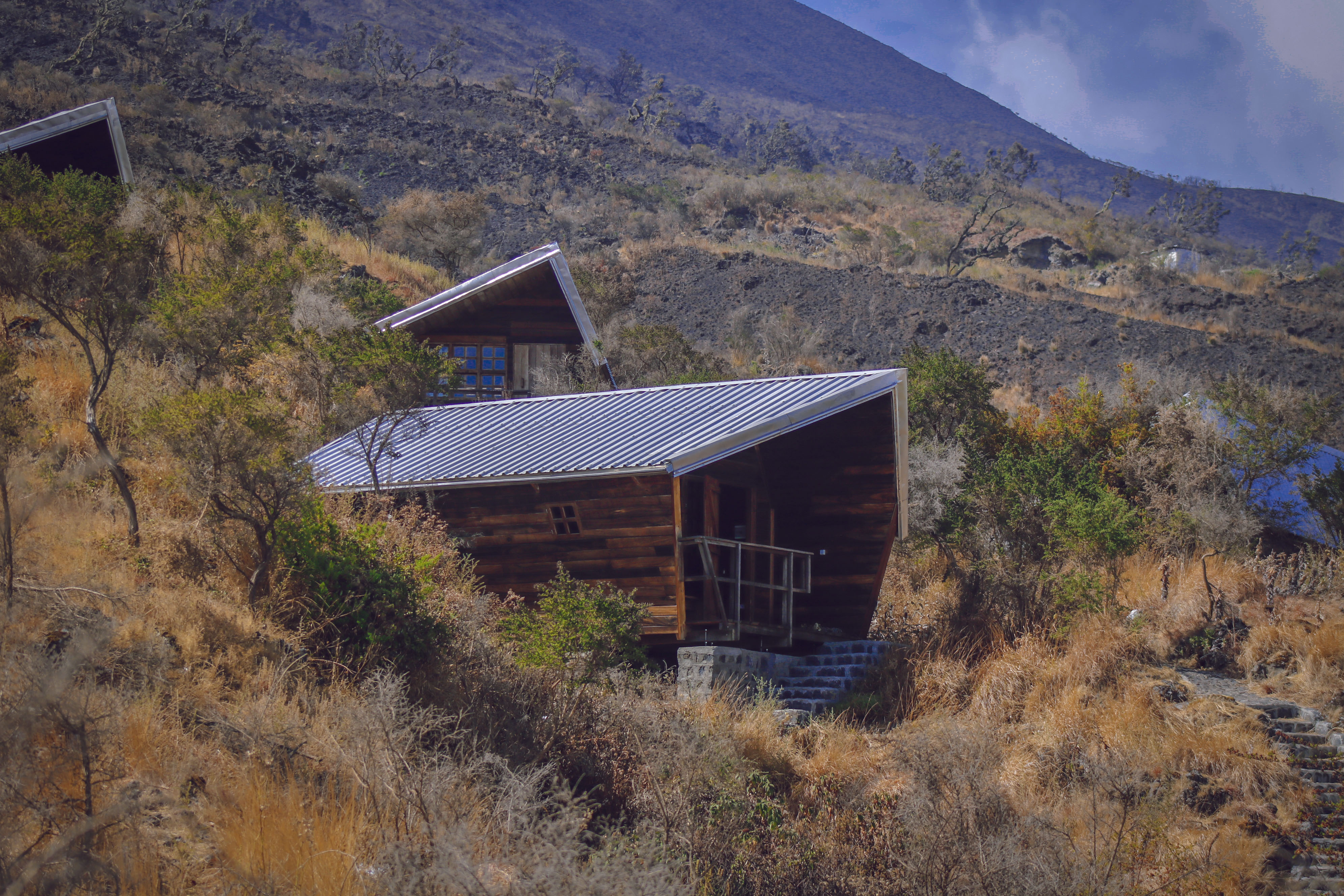
Accommodations at hut 2

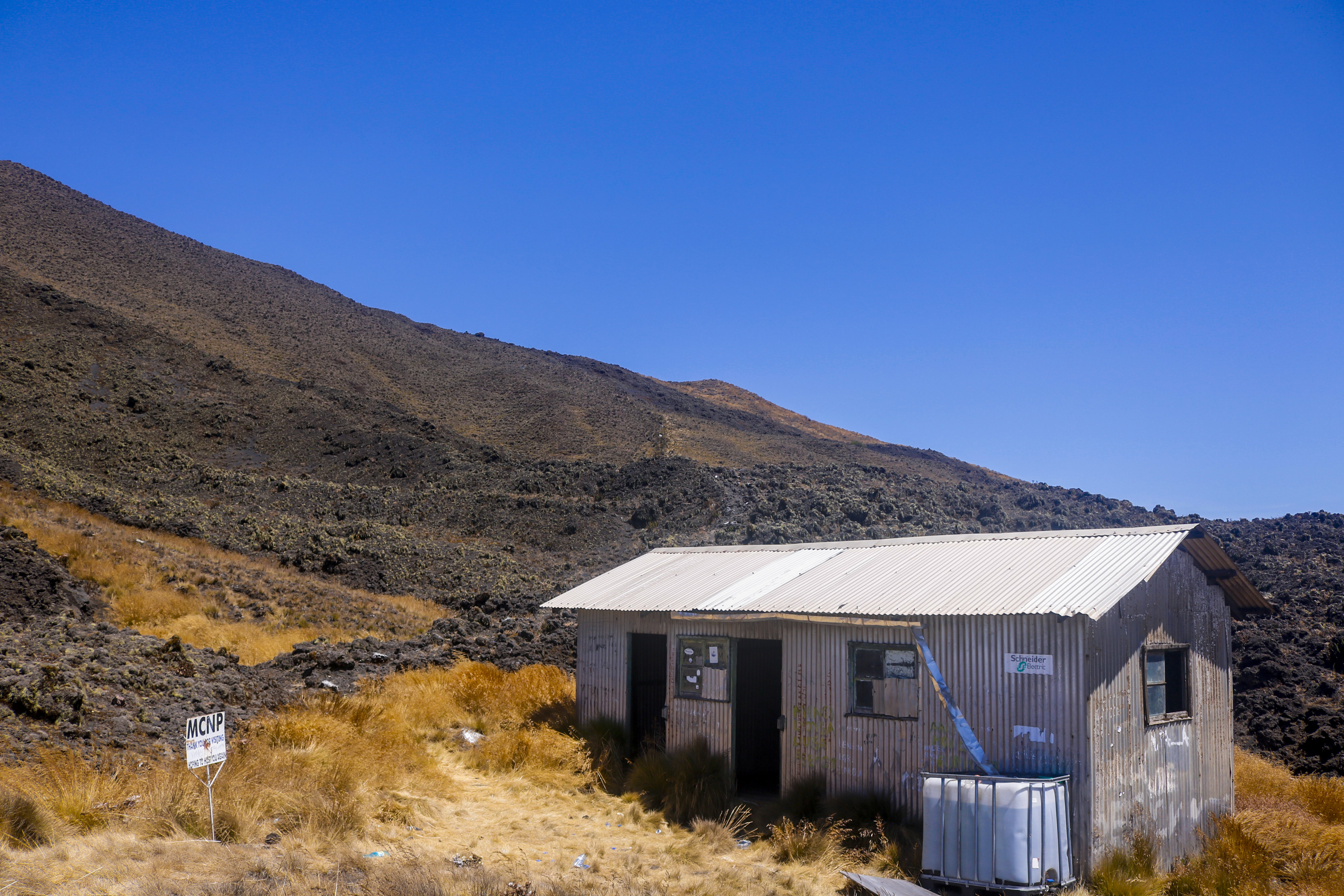
Ditto
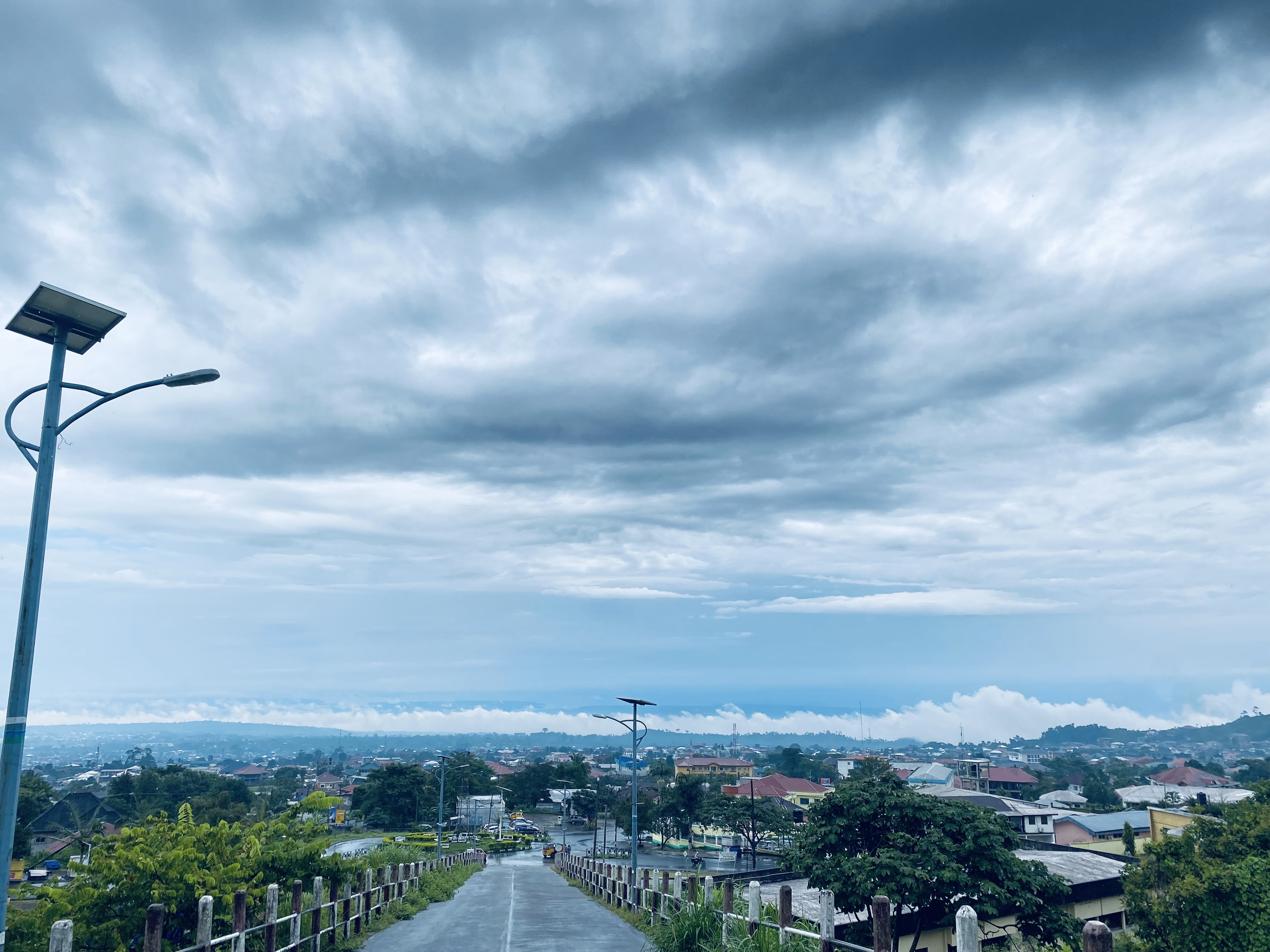
Entrance to Mount Cameroon National Park

Cameroon Mountain Race

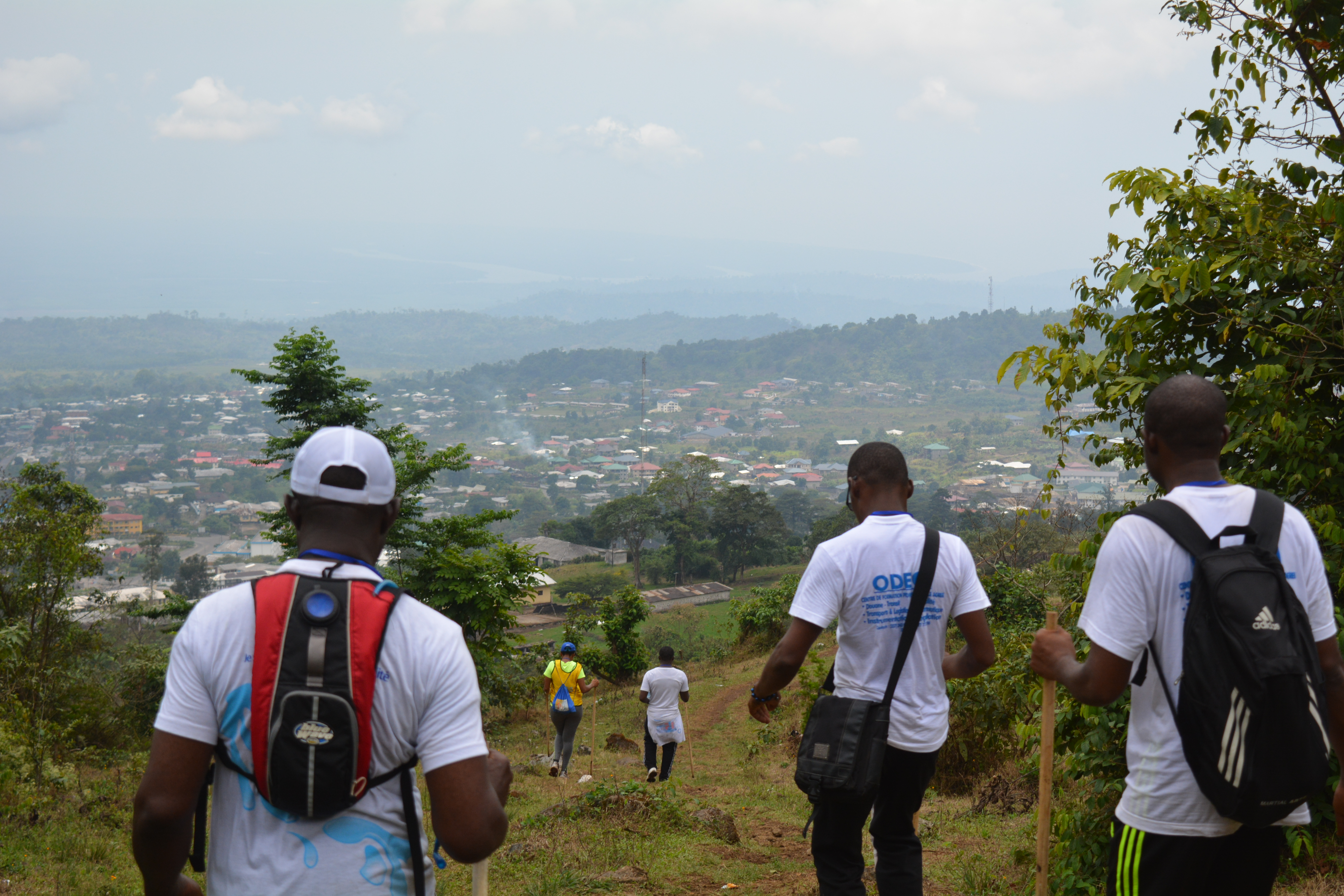
Hikers climbing down

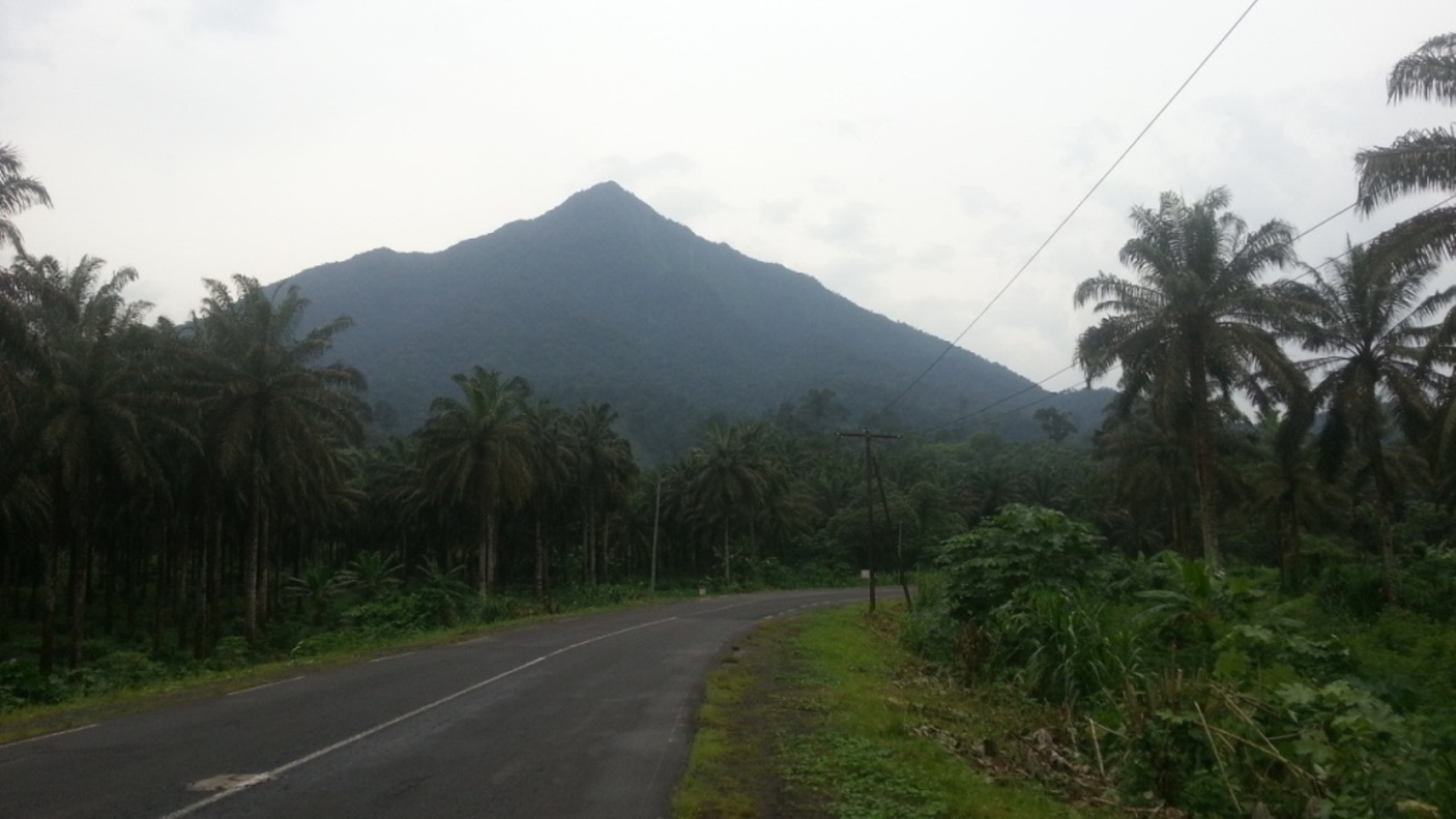
View of Mount Etinde

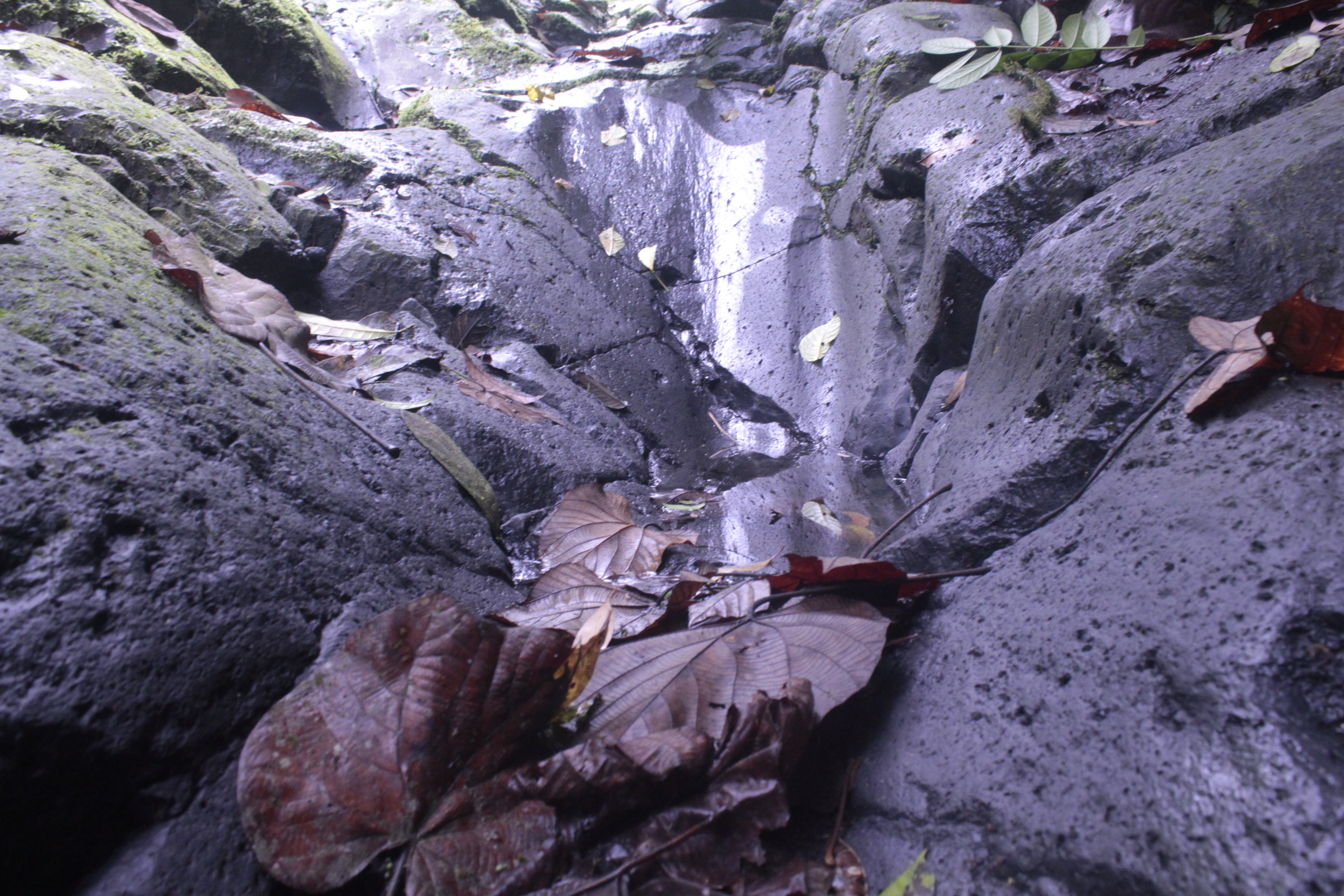
Mount Cameroon tropical rocks
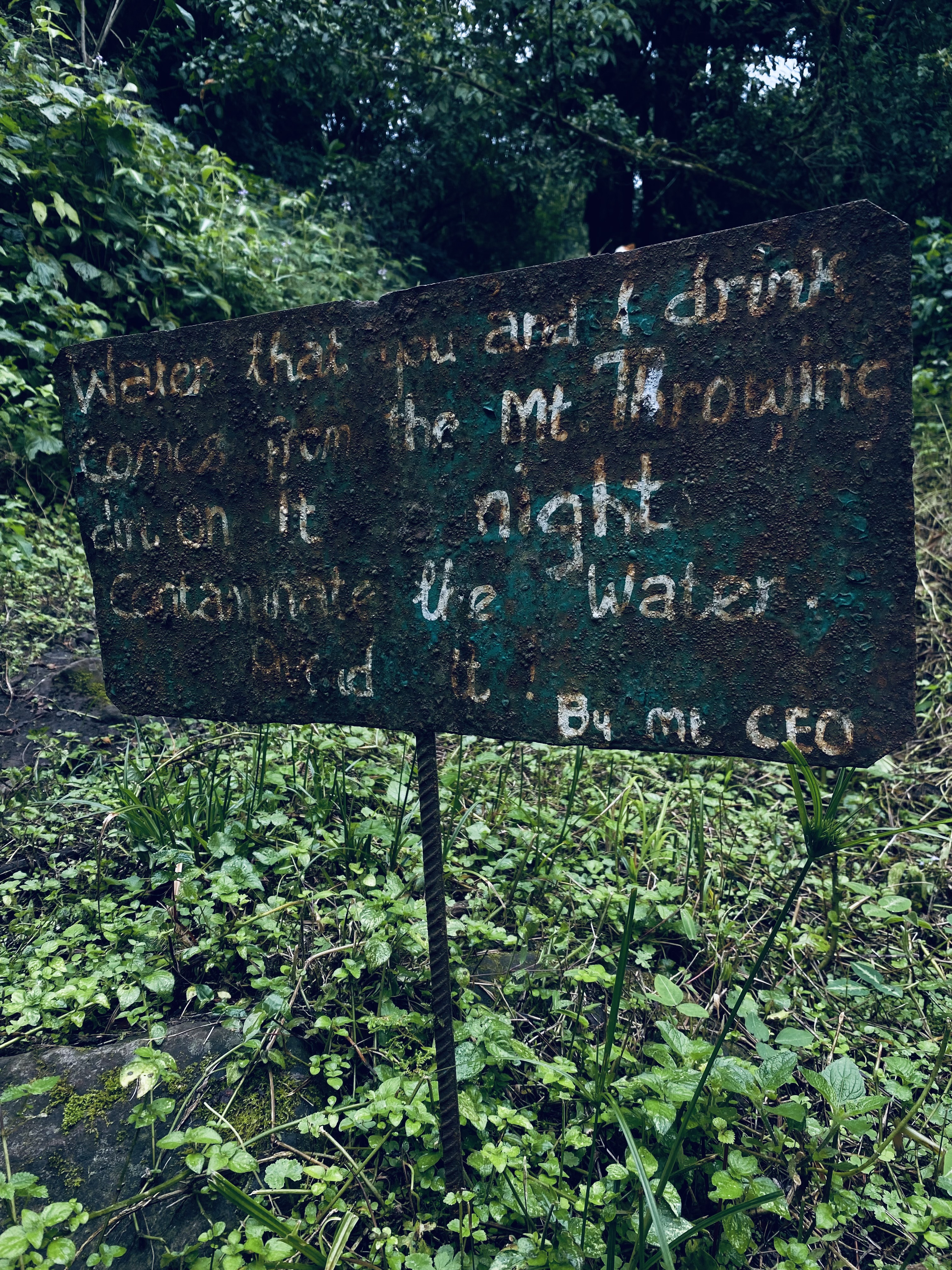
Mount Cameroon National Park
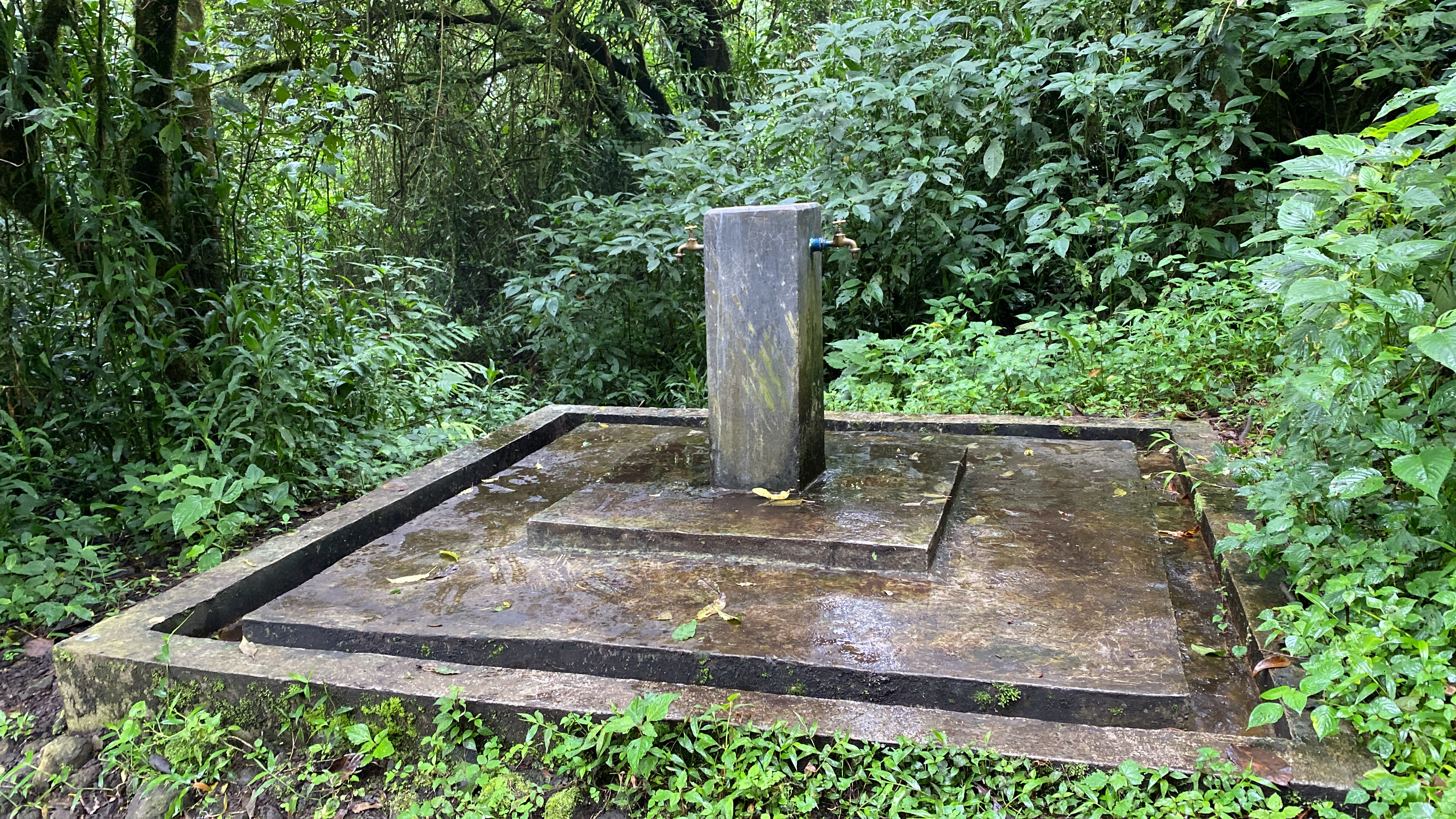
Water point on Mount Cameroon National Park

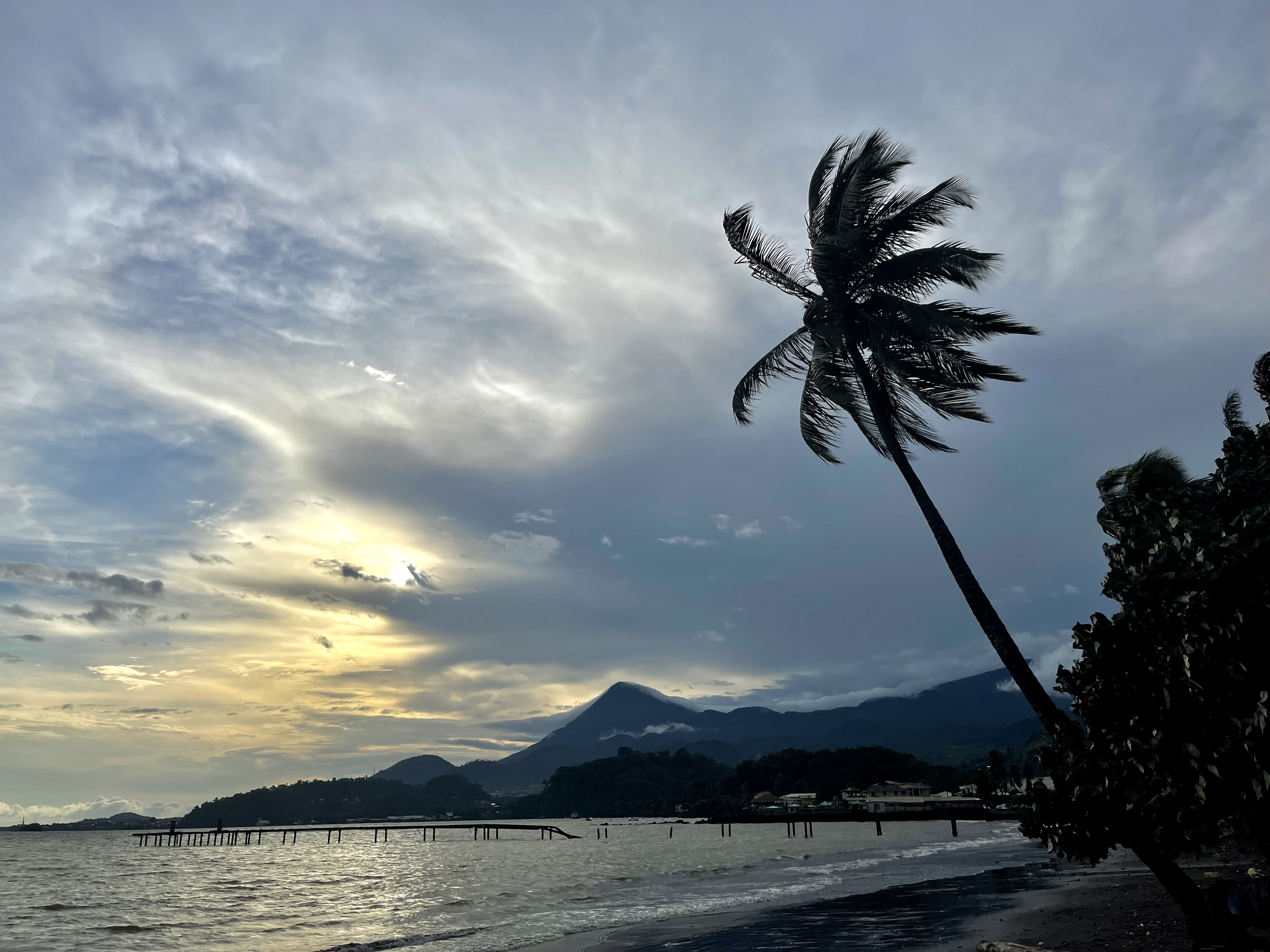
Limbe Beach

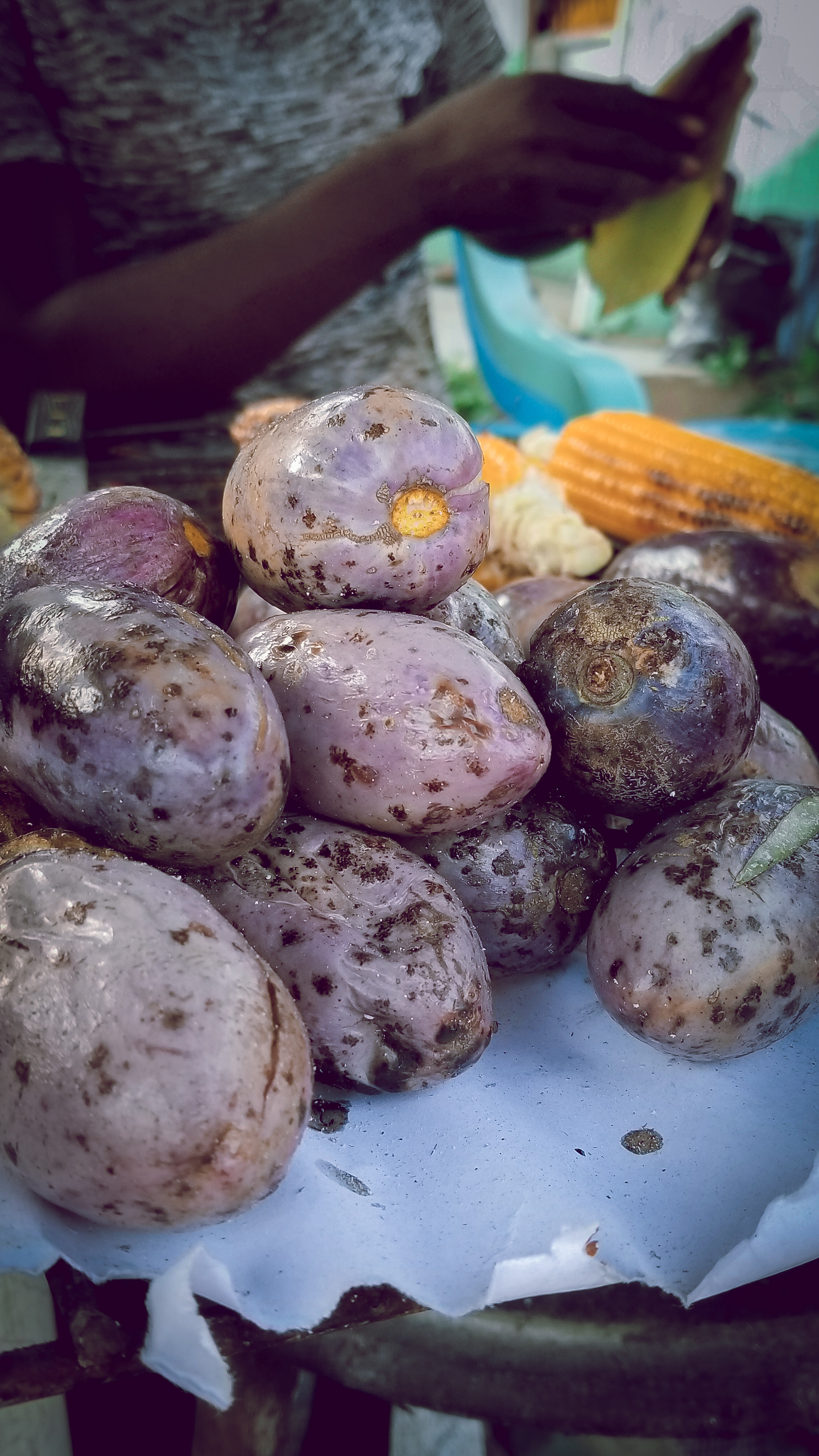
Grilled plums

== See also ==
- Debundscha
- List of volcanoes in Cameroon
