= Impatiens dorjeekhandui =

Scientific classification
- Kingdom: Plantae
- Clade: Embryophytes
- Clade: Tracheophytes
- Clade: Spermatophytes
- Clade: Angiosperms
- Clade: Eudicots
- Clade: Asterids
- Order: Ericales
- Family: Balsaminaceae
- Genus: Impatiens
- Species: I. dorjeekhandui

Binomial name
- Impatiens dorjeekhandui Chowlu, S.S.Dash & Gogoi

Species of flowering plant

Impatiens dorjeekhandui is a species of flowering plant in the family Balsaminaceae. It is an annual herb with pink and purple flowers. The species is native to Arunachal Pradesh, and was named after Dorjee Khandu.

It was first described in 2017.

== Distribution ==
Impatiens dorjeekhandui is native to the subtropical biome of the eastern Himalayas, in the Indian state of Arunachal Pradesh. It grows in shady areas, at the edges of moist temperate forests.

== Description ==
Impatiens dorjeekhandui is an annual herb, which grows 10–50 centimetres (0.33–1.64 ft) tall. The leaves are elliptical, hairy, and measure 1.5–7 centimetres (0.59–2.76 in) by 1–3.7 centimetres (0.39–1.46 in) in size. The leaf stems are 0.1–2.5 centimetres (0.039–0.984 in) long.

The flowers are whitish, pink and purple. The inflorescences have one to five flowers each. The flower stalks are around 1.7 centimetres (0.67 in) long. The fruits are rod-shaped. The species flowers and fruits in September.

Impatiens dorjeekhandui appears similar to Impatiens nagorum and Impatiens balfourii.

== Etymology ==
Impatiens dorjeekhandui is named after Dorjee Khandu, former Chief Minister of Arunachal Pradesh, for his contributions to development in the area.
