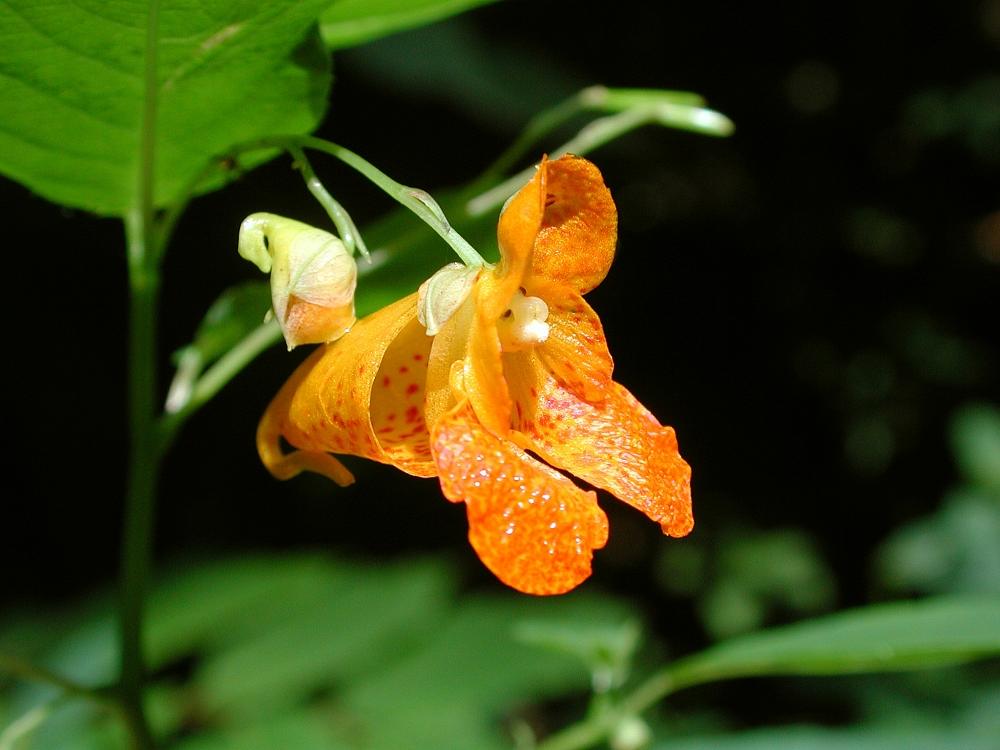

Conservation status
- Least Concern (IUCN 3.1)

- Secure (NatureServe)

Scientific classification
- Kingdom: Plantae
- Clade: Tracheophytes
- Clade: Angiosperms
- Clade: Eudicots
- Clade: Asterids
- Order: Ericales
- Family: Balsaminaceae
- Genus: Impatiens
- Species: I. capensis

Binomial name
- Impatiens capensis Meerb.

Synonyms
- Impatiens biflora Walter; Impatiens fulva Nutt.

= Impatiens capensis =

Orange jewelweed

Species of flowering plant

Impatiens capensis, the orange jewelweed, common jewelweed, spotted jewelweed, jewelweed, spotted touch-me-not, or orange balsam, is an annual plant in the family Balsaminaceae that is native to North America. It is common in bottomland soils, ditches, and along creeks, often growing side by side with its less common relative, yellow jewelweed (I. pallida).

== Description ==
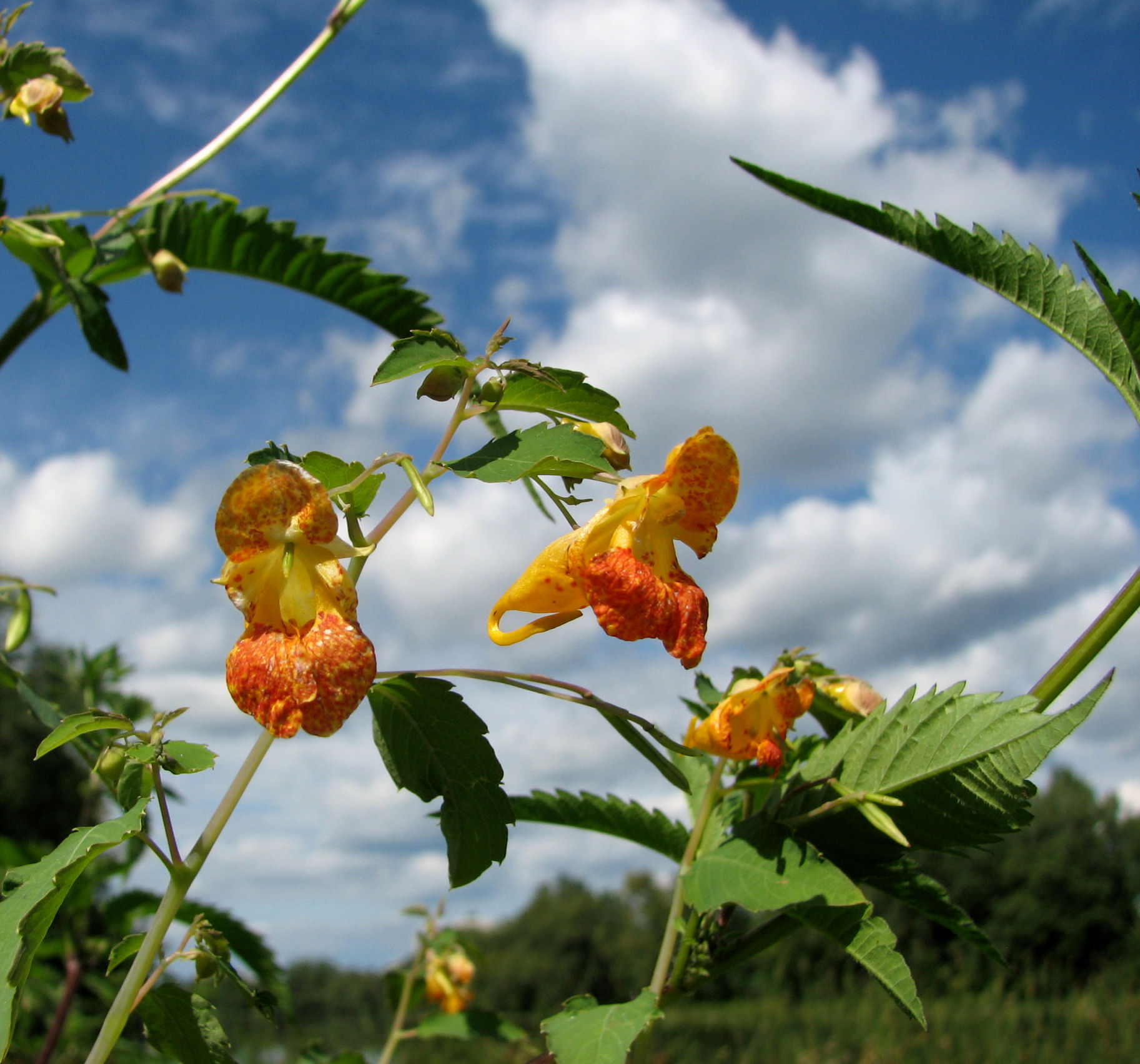
Flowers and leaves

Jewelweed is a herbaceous plant that grows 0.9–1.5 m (3–5 ft) tall. It often branches extensively. The round stems are glabrous (smooth) and succulent, and semi-translucent, with swollen or darkened nodes on some plants. The leaves, which measure up to 13 cm (5 in) long and 6 cm (2 1/2 in) across, are alternate on the upper stems and opposite on the lower stems (when present). The leaves are ovate to elliptic, simple, and have shallow, rounded teeth on the margins. The seed pods have five valves which coil back rapidly to eject the seeds in a process called explosive dehiscence or ballistochory. This reaction is where the name 'touch-me-not' comes from; in mature seed pods, dehiscence can easily be triggered with a light touch.

The plant blooms from late spring to early fall. The flowers are 2–3 cm (3/4–1 1/4 in) long, orange (sometimes blood orange or rarely yellow) with a three-lobed corolla; one of the calyx lobes is colored similarly to the corolla and forms a hooked conical spur at the back of the flower. Plants may also produce non-showy cleistogamous flowers, which do not require cross-pollination.

=== Pollination ===
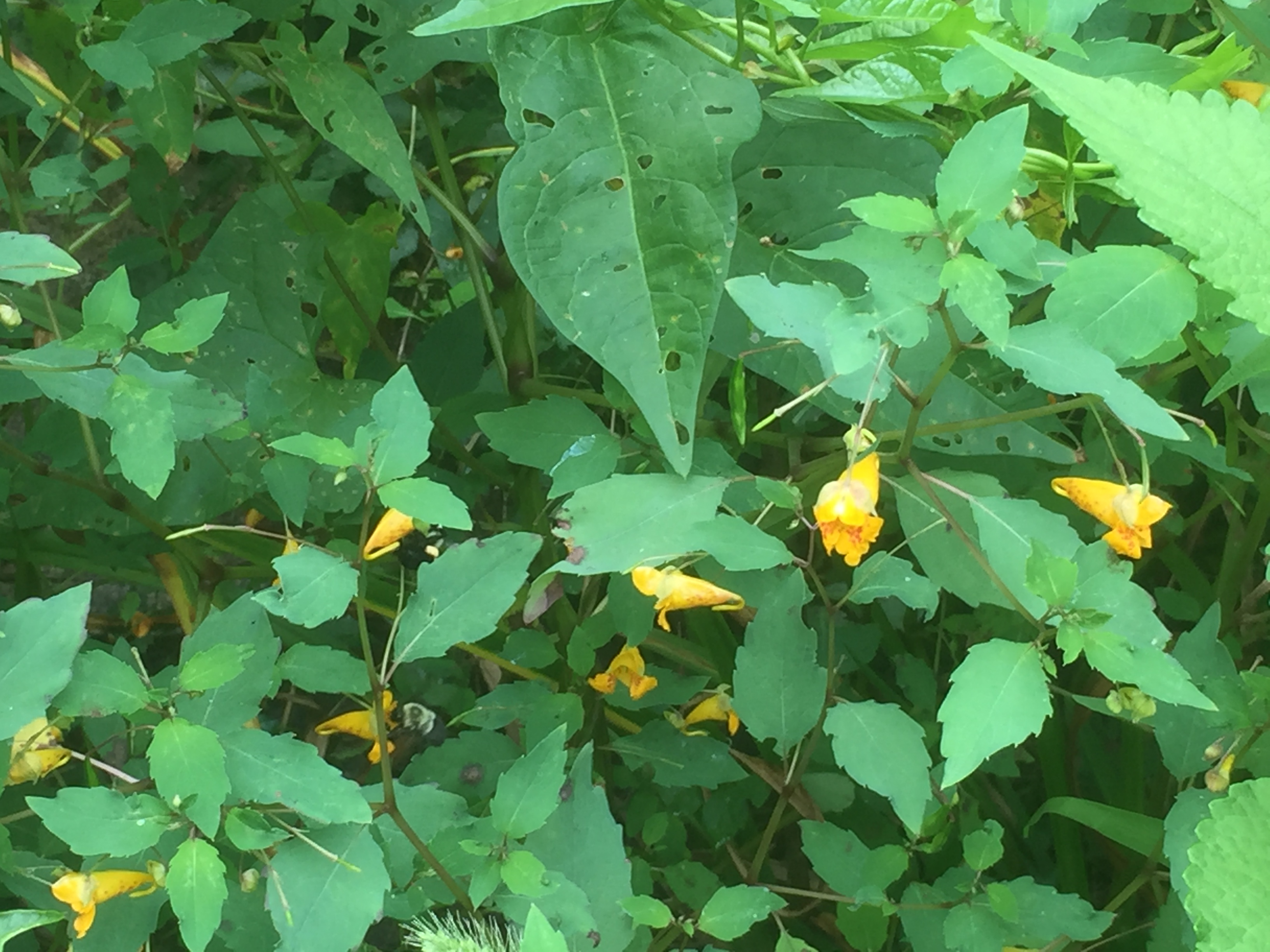
A carpenter bee feeding on jewelweed

Nectar spurs are tubular elongations of petals and sepals of certain flowers that usually contain nectar. Flowers of I. capensis have these nectar spurs. Nectar spurs are thought to have played a role in plant-pollinator coevolution. Curvature angles of nectar spurs of I. capensis are variable. This angle varies from 0 degrees to 270 degrees.

The angle of the nectar spur is very important in the pollination of the flower and in determining the most efficient pollinator. Hummingbirds are major pollinators. They remove more pollen per visit from flowers with curved nectar spurs than with perpendicular nectar spurs. But hummingbirds are not the only pollinators of I. capensis. Bees, especially bumblebees play an important role in pollination as well. Due to hummingbirds and bees, the pollination of I. capensis is very high.

== Distribution ==
Impatiens capensis was transported in the 19th and 20th centuries to England, France, the Netherlands, Poland, Sweden, Finland, and potentially other areas of northern and central Europe. These naturalized populations persist in the absence of any common cultivation by people. This jewelweed species is quite similar to Impatiens noli-tangere, an Impatiens species native to Europe and Asia, as well as the other North American Impatiens. No evidence exists of natural hybrids, although the habitats occupied by the two species are very similar.

In the State of Washington, I. capensis is considered a class-C noxious weed due to its rapid spread and tendency to outcompete native jewelweeds. It has also formed a hybrid species with the native jewelweed Impatiens ecornuta.

== Uses ==
=== As food ===
The young shoots can be boiled (with two changes of water) as a potherb; eating too much is not recommended as the plant contains calcium oxalate crystals. The seeds are also edible, and probably best before exploding.

=== Medicinal ===
Along with other species of jewelweed, the juice of the leaves and stems is a traditional Native American remedy for skin rashes due to poison ivy, stinging nettle, and insect bites. The effectiveness of its use to prevent the development of a rash after short-term exposure to poison ivy has been supported by peer-reviewed study, and is likely due to the plant containing saponins. These studies also found that some individuals have a sensitivity to jewelweed which can cause a more severe rash.

The stem juice has also been used to treat athlete's foot; its fungicidal qualities have been scientifically verified.

== Etymology ==
The leaves appear to be silver or 'jeweled' when held underwater, which is possibly where the jewelweed name comes from. Another possible source of the name is the color and shape of the bright robin's egg-blue kernels of the green projectile seeds. Both the genus name Impatiens ("impatience" in Latin) and common name spotted touch-me-not refer to how its seeds when ripe pop open on touch.

The species name capensis, meaning "of the cape", is actually a misnomer, as Nicolaas Meerburgh was under the mistaken impression that it was native to the Cape of Good Hope, in southern Africa.

== Gallery ==
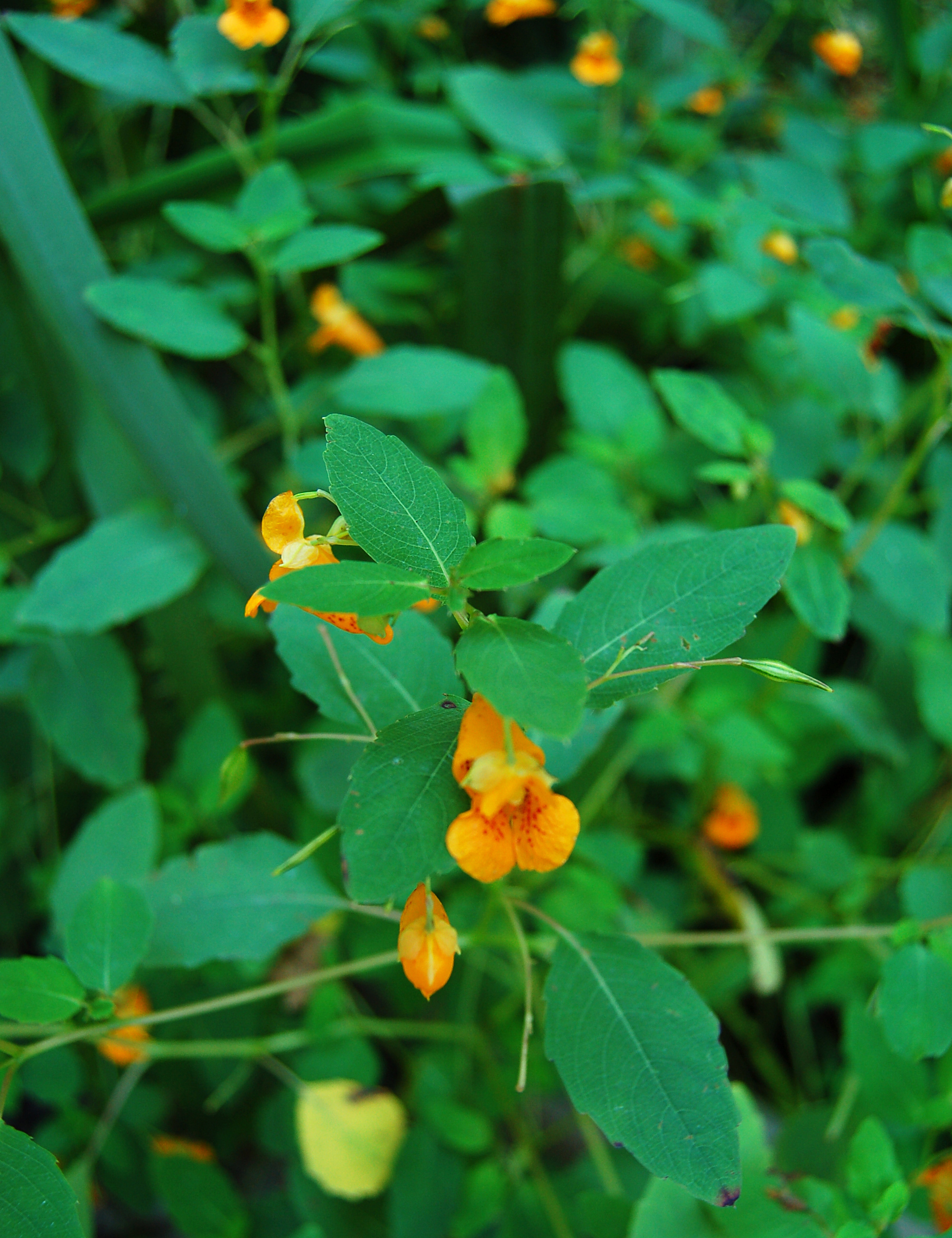
Leaves and flowers

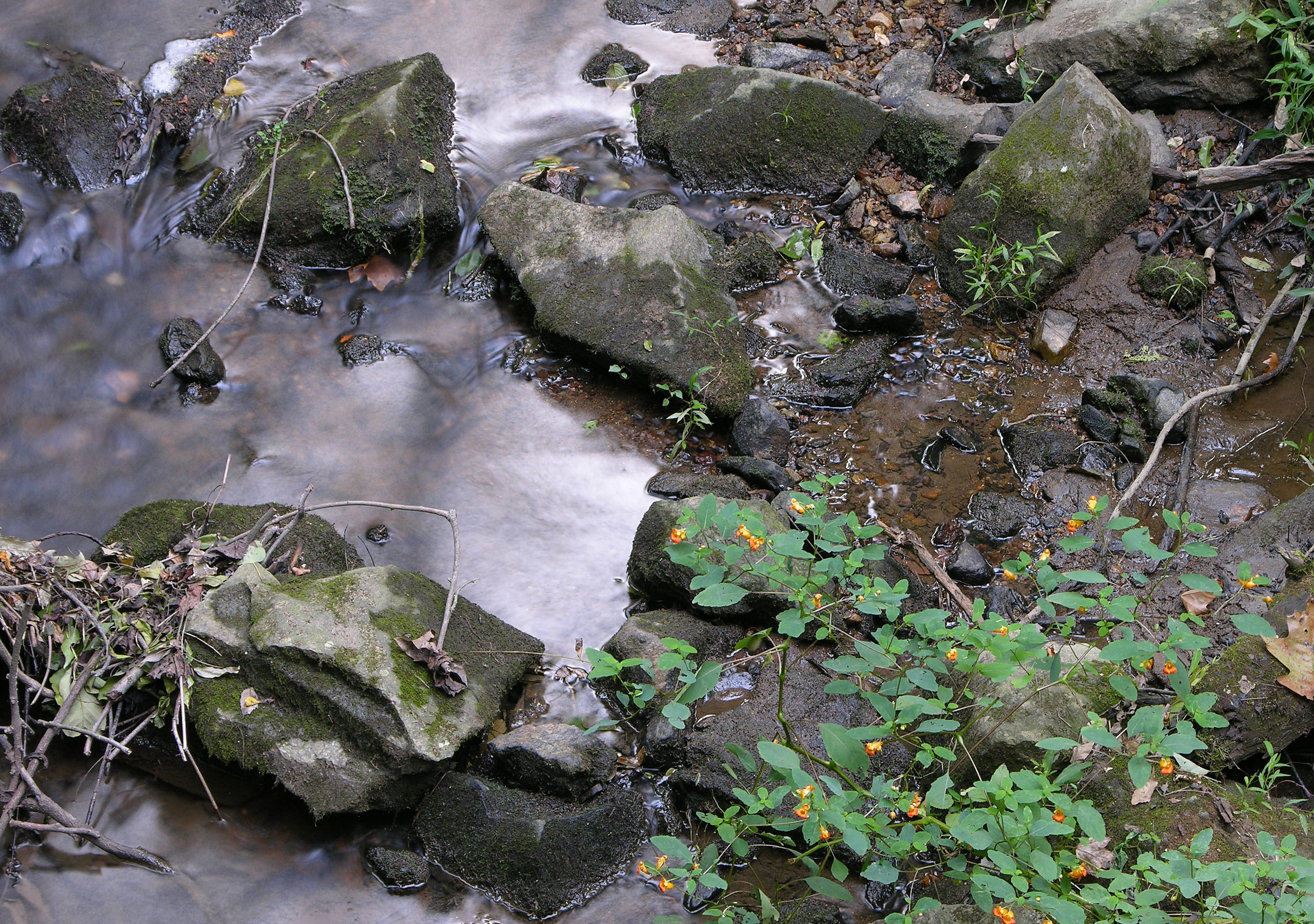
Jewelweed growing on a creek side

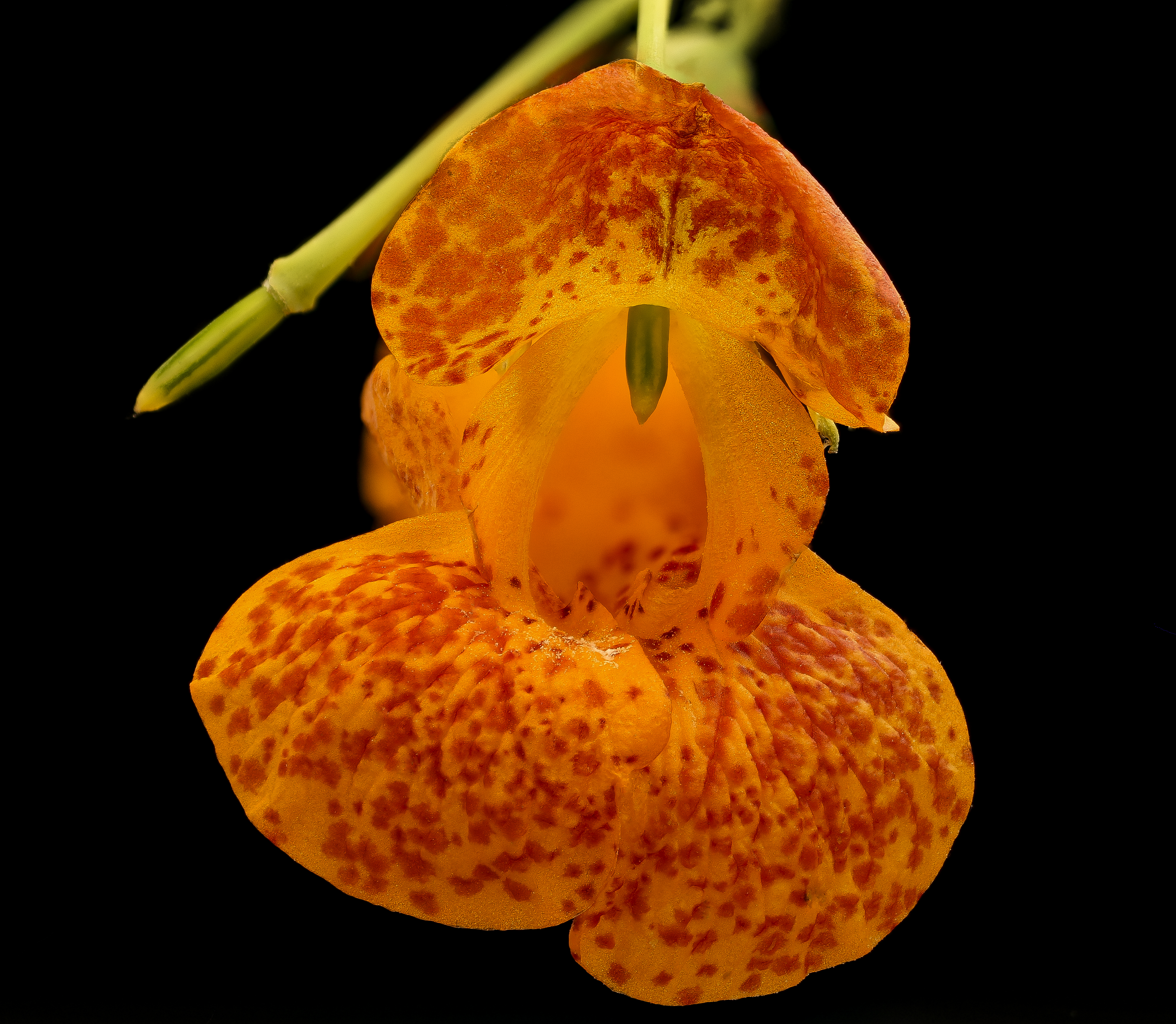
Flower closeup

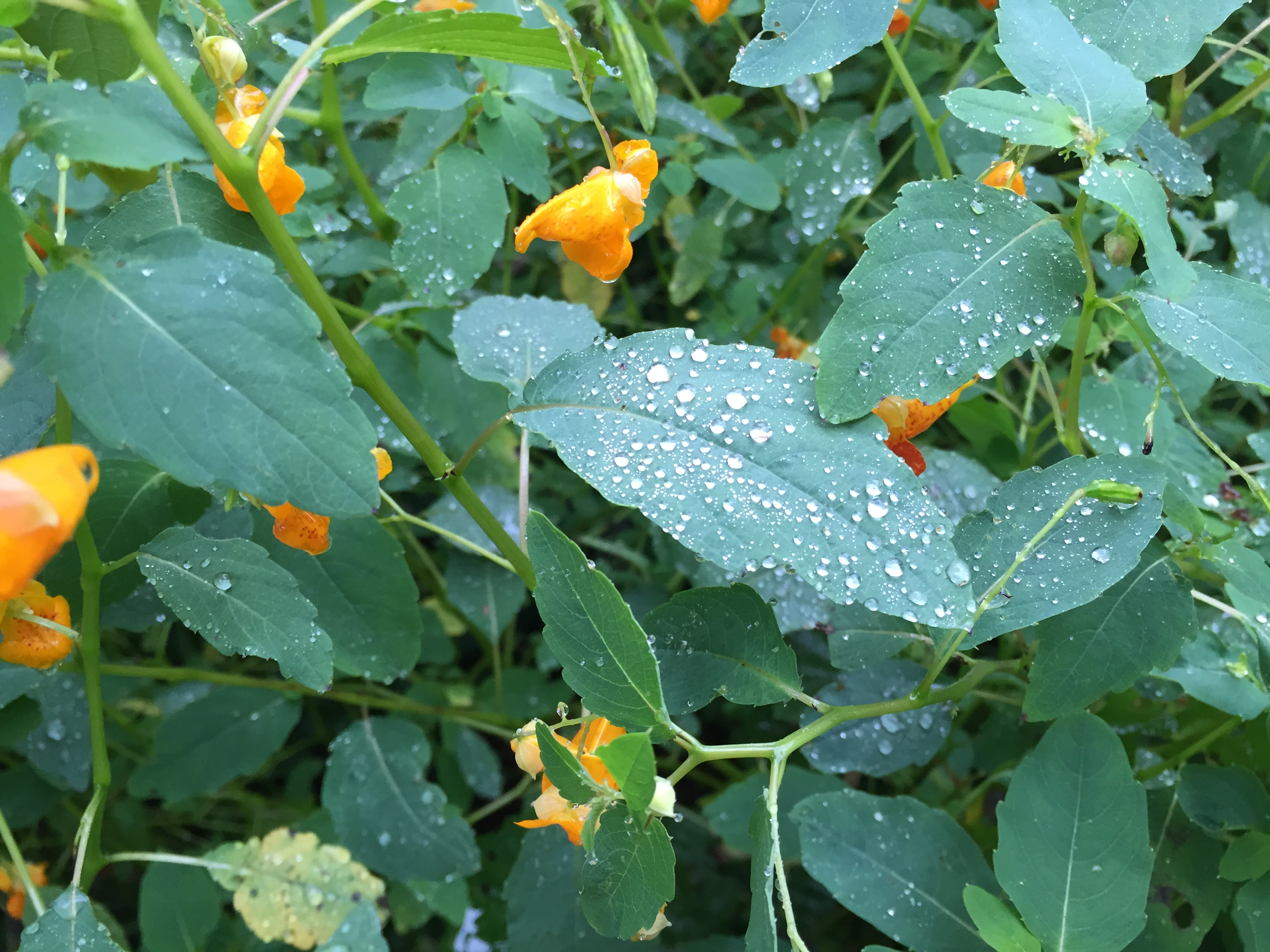
Leaf showing beads (jewels) just after rain
