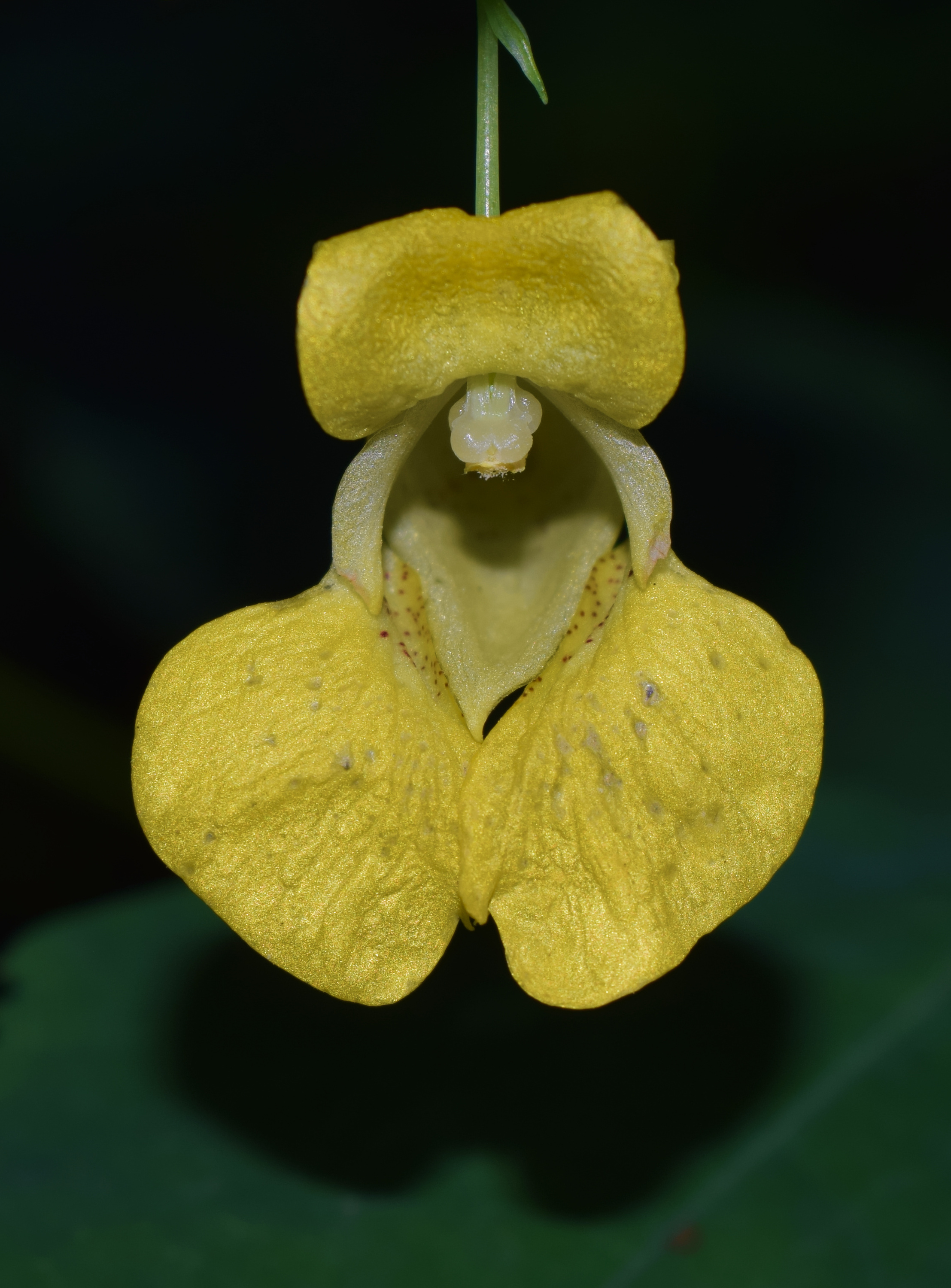
- Pale jewelweed blooming in the rare Charitable Research Reserve (Ontario, Canada)

Conservation status
- Secure (NatureServe)

Scientific classification
- Kingdom: Plantae
- Clade: Tracheophytes
- Clade: Angiosperms
- Clade: Eudicots
- Clade: Asterids
- Order: Ericales
- Family: Balsaminaceae
- Genus: Impatiens
- Species: I. pallida

Binomial name
- Impatiens pallida Nutt.

= Impatiens pallida =

Pale jewelweed

Species of flowering plant

Impatiens pallida, with the common names pale jewelweed, or yellow jewelweed, is a flowering annual plant in the family Balsaminaceae native to Canada and the United States. It grows in moist to wet soils, generally alongside the closely related Impatiens capensis, producing flowers from midsummer through fall.

== Description ==
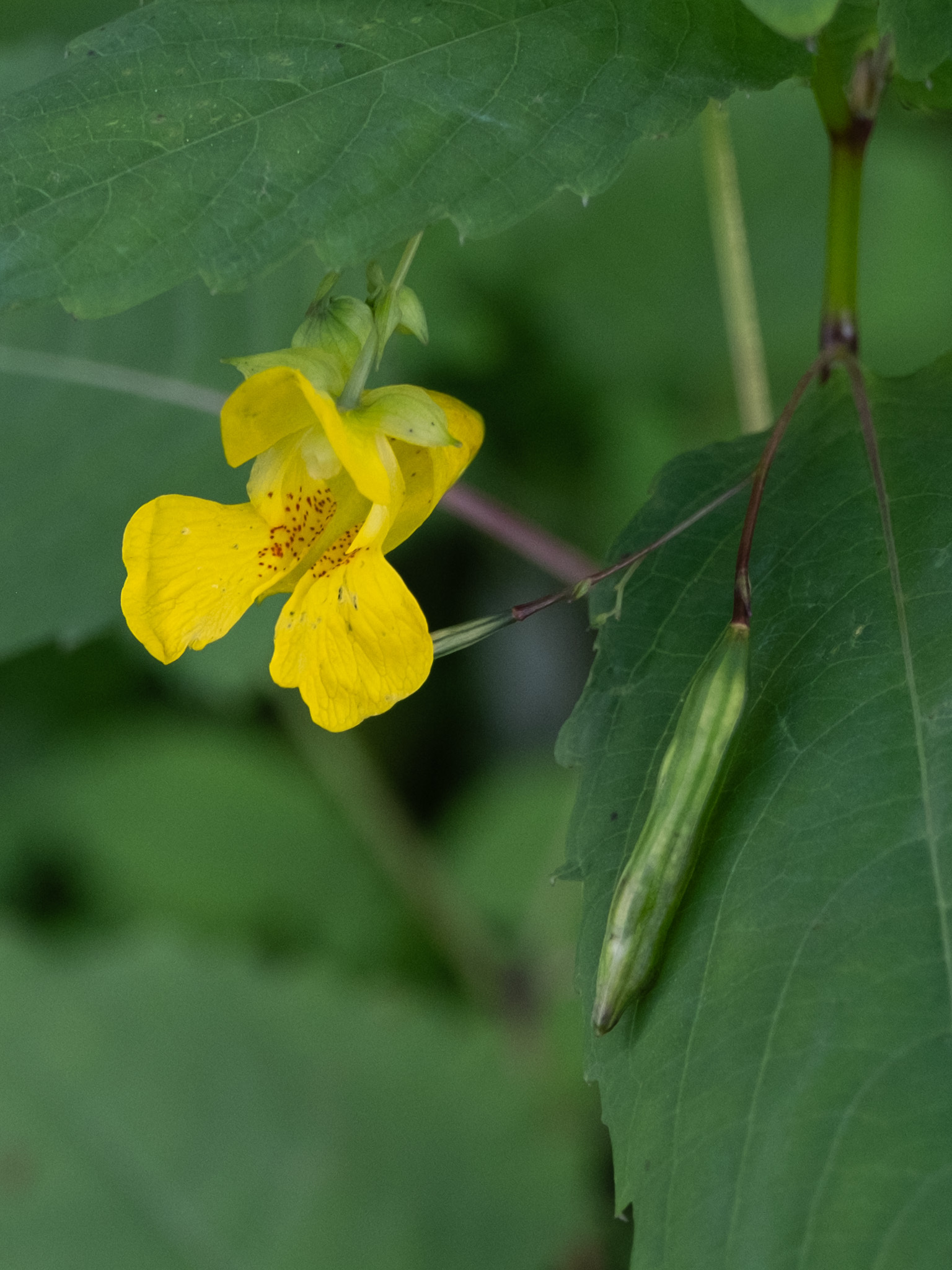
Flower and fruit

The plant can grow up to 2 metres (6 ft 7 in) in height. The light green stems branch frequently and are smooth and slightly succulent. Leaves measure up to 10 centimetres (4 in) long and 5 cm (2 in) across and are alternate. They are simple, hairless, ovate, and have teeth on the margins.

The flowers are yellow, with reddish-spots on their faces, differentiating the plant from the similar Impatiens capensis, which has orange flowers. They are tube or funnel shaped and 3–4 cm (1–1.5 in) long, with nectar stored at a narrow spur at the back of the flower. The flowers cluster in small quantities among the upper leaves. After blooming, the flowers are replaced by a narrow seed pod up to 3 cm (1 in) long. When the seeds are ripe, they explode from the pod when touched, giving the plant its common name, touch-me-not.

=== Pollination ===
Nectar spurs are tubular elongations of petals and sepals of certain flowers that usually contain nectar. Flowers of I. pallida have nectar spurs which are thought to have played a role in plant-pollinator coevolution. Most of the nectar spurs of I. pallida are perpendicular but some of them are curved.

These nectar spur flowers are either partially or completely pollinated by insects. The specific pollinator is determined by the curvature of the nectar spur. Since I. pallida have perpendicular nectar spurs, bees are the main pollinators.

== Distribution and habitat ==
I. pallida is native in the United States from North Dakota to the north and west, Georgia to the south, and Maine to the east. In Canada, it is native in Ontario, Quebec, New Brunswick, Newfoundland, and Nova Scotia. It can be found in wet, soggy soils, such as along ponds and streams, in swamps, in moist deciduous woodlands, and in wet thickets.

== Uses ==
Like I. capensis, the young shoots can be boiled (with two changes of water) as a potherb, and the seeds are also edible.

Along with other species of jewelweed or "touch-me-not", it is a traditional remedy for skin rashes.
