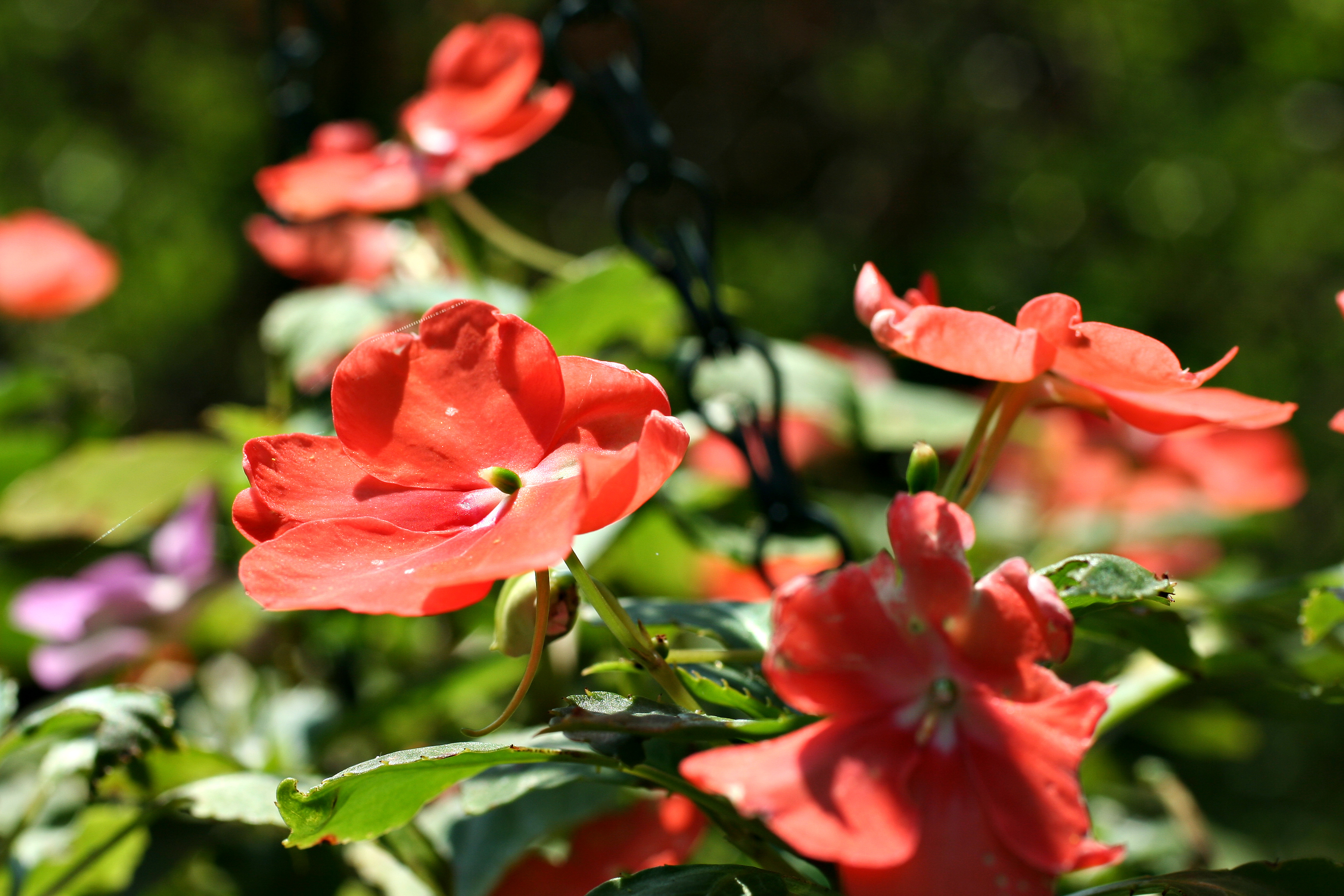

Scientific classification
- Kingdom: Plantae
- Clade: Tracheophytes
- Clade: Angiosperms
- Clade: Eudicots
- Clade: Asterids
- Order: Ericales
- Family: Balsaminaceae
- Genus: Impatiens
- Species: I. walleriana

Binomial name
- Impatiens walleriana Hook.f.

Synonyms
- Impatiens giorgii De Wild.; Impatiens holstii Engl. & Warb.; Impatiens lujai De Wild.; Impatiens sultani Hook.f.

= Impatiens walleriana =

Busy Lizzy

Species of flowering plant

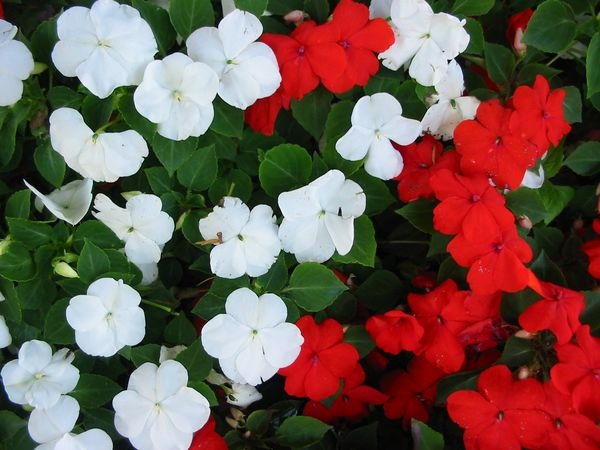
Impatiens walleriana

Impatiens walleriana (syn. Impatiens sultanii), also known as busy Lizzie (British Isles), balsam, sultana, or simply impatiens, is a species of the genus Impatiens, native to eastern Africa from Kenya to Mozambique. The Latin specific epithet walleriana honours a British missionary, Horace Waller (1833–1896).

== Description ==
It is a flowering herbaceous perennial plant growing to 15–60 cm (6–24 in) tall, with broad lanceolate leaves 3–12 cm long and 2–5 cm broad. Leaves are mostly alternate, although they may be opposite near the top of the plant. The changeable, simple leaves are stalked 1.5 to 6 cm long. The leaf blade is ovate to broadly elliptic, sometimes obovate, 2.5 to 13 inches long and 2 to 5.5 inches wide, green and sometimes spotted or pink or reddish on the underside. Leaflets are missing.

The hermaphroditic, zygomorphic flowers are profusely borne, 2–5 cm diameter, with five petals and a 1 cm spur. The seedpod explodes when ripe in the same manner as other Impatiens species, an evolutionary adaptation for seed dispersal. The lower sepals are slightly boat-shaped and narrow suddenly in the 2.8 to 4.5 inches long, thread-like curved, but not curved back spur. The stems are semi-succulent, and all parts of the plant (leaves, stems, flowers, roots) are soft and easily damaged.

== Cultivation ==
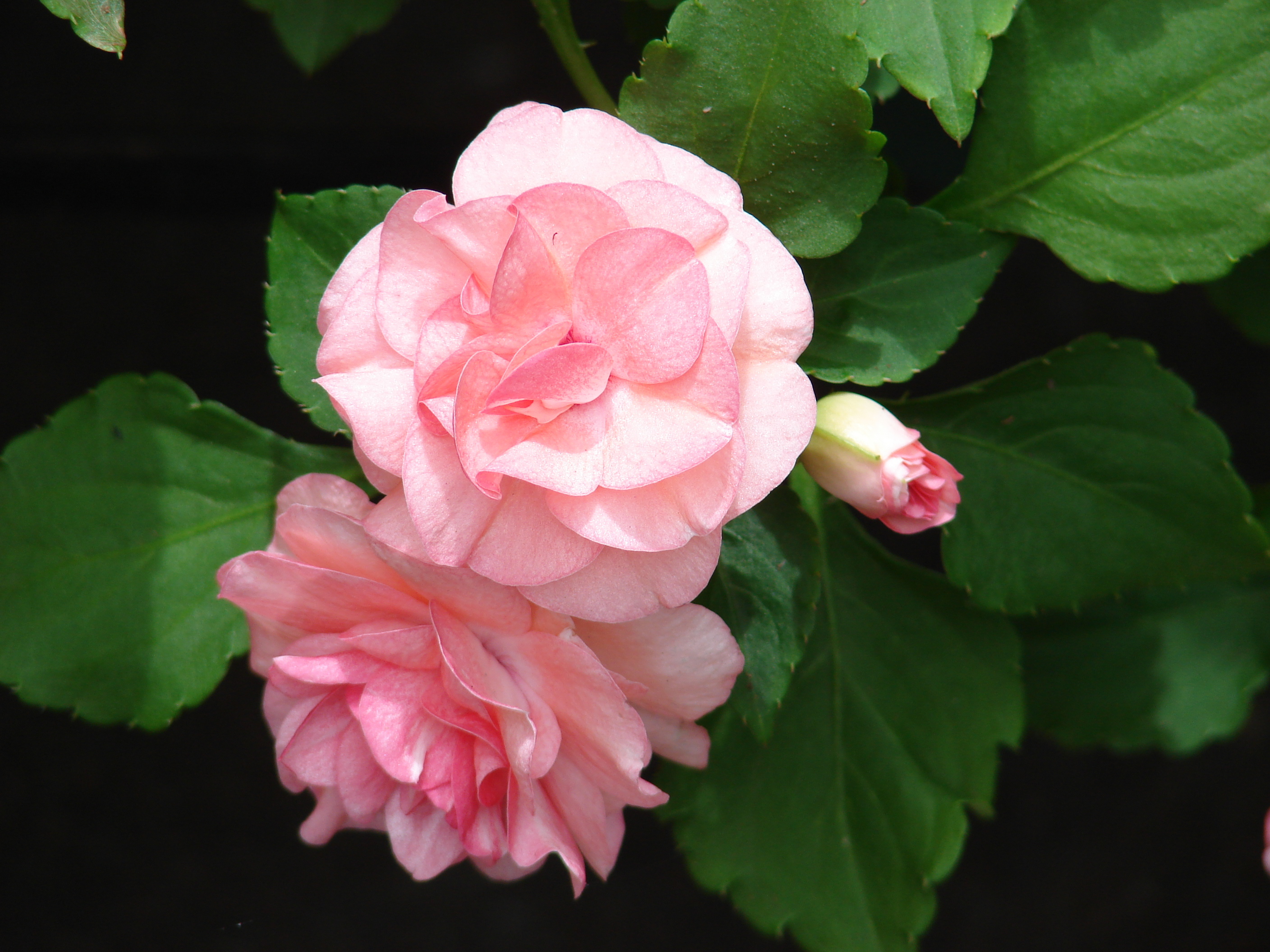
Double impatiens

Impatiens is one of the most popular of all bedding plants for parks and gardens worldwide, typically grown in containers but also in bedding schemes. Propagation is by seed or stem cuttings (which often root readily in water).

Impatiens is perennial in frost-free growing conditions, but not hardy in temperate regions, where it is grown from seed indoors in winter before being moved outdoors as an annual. (Potted outdoor plants may be successfully overwintered indoors).

=== Cultivars ===
Numerous cultivars in a range of colours from white to purple, are widely available commercially, either as seeds or young plants. They include the following:

- Accent series
- 'Blackberry Ice'
- 'Confection'
- 'Eclipse'
- 'Elfin White'
- 'Extra Dwarf'
- 'Fiesta Ole' (double variety)
- 'Lipstick'
- 'Red Star'
- Super Elfin series
- Tempo Series
- 'Wink and Blink'

The Super Elfin series was bred by Claude Hope in Costa Rica, developed from its native wild form into one of the most popular bedding plants in the world.

=== AGM cultivars ===
The following cultivars have gained the Royal Horticultural Society's Award of Garden Merit:-

Divine Series

- Divine Violet

Magnum Series

- Magnum Wild Salmon

SunHarmony Series

- Sun Harmony Deep Orange = 'Dhar328'

SunPatiens Series

- Compact Blush Pink = 'Sakimp013'
- Compact Electric Orange = 'Sakimp025'
- Compact Orange = 'Sakimp011’
- Spreading Variegated Salmon = 'Sakimp005’
- Spreading Variegated White = 'Sakimp018’

== See also ==
- Impatiens hawkeri - "New Guinea impatiens"
