= I. tinctoria =

I. tinctoria may refer to:

- Impatiens tinctoria, the dyers busy lizzie, a species of flowering plant in the balsam family Balsaminaceae
- Indigofera tinctoria, the true indigo, a plant species
- Isatis tinctoria, woad, a flowering plant species

== See also ==
- Tinctoria
