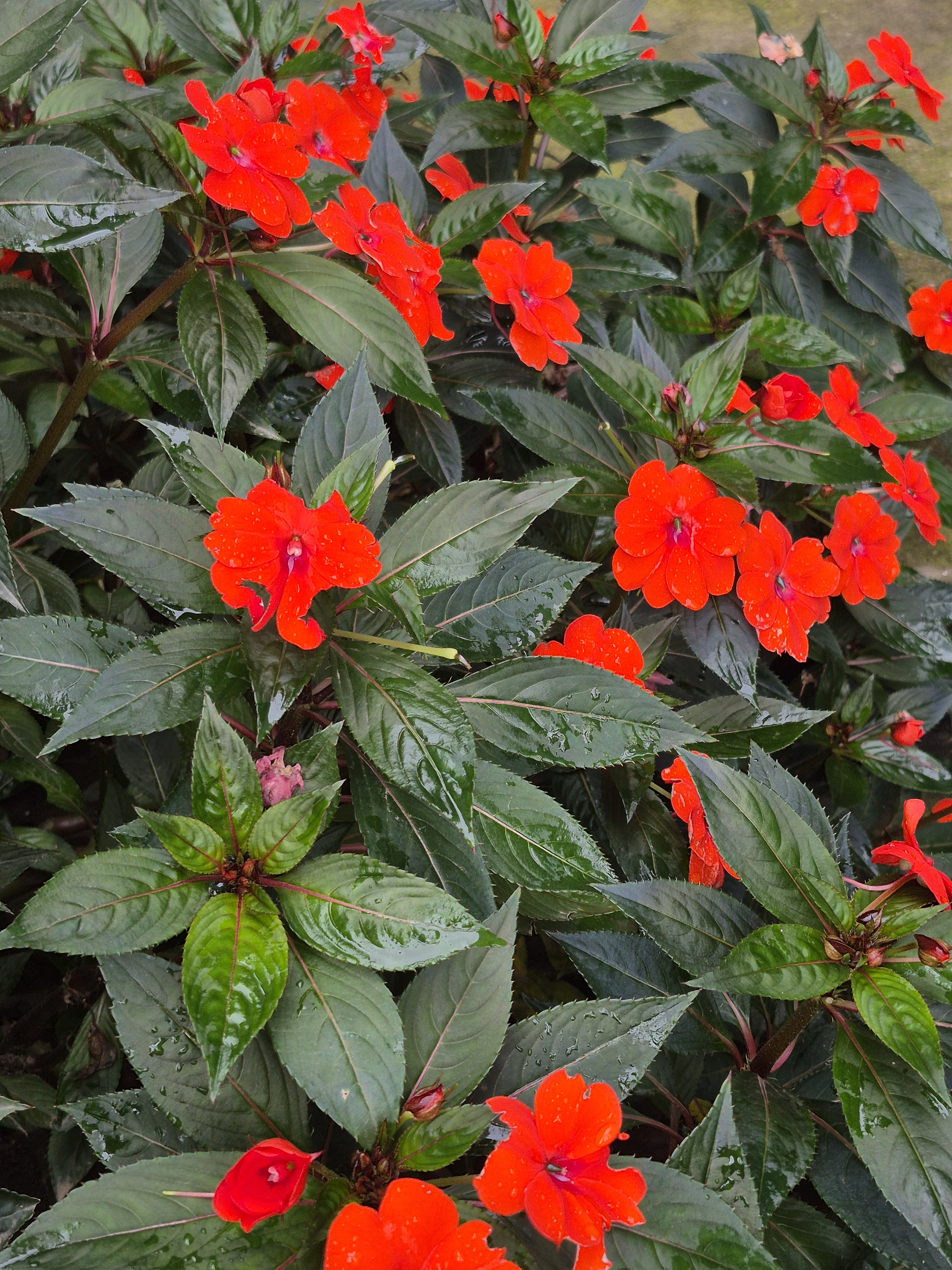
- Specimen with red flowers located in Brazil

Scientific classification
- Kingdom: Plantae
- Clade: Tracheophytes
- Clade: Angiosperms
- Clade: Eudicots
- Clade: Asterids
- Order: Ericales
- Family: Balsaminaceae
- Genus: Impatiens
- Species: I. hawkeri

Binomial name
- Impatiens hawkeri W.Bull

= Impatiens hawkeri =

Species of flowering plant

Impatiens hawkeri, the New Guinea impatiens, is a species of flowering plant in the family Balsaminaceae. It is native to Papua New Guinea and the Solomon Islands. It has been bred and hybridized in cultivation to produce a line of garden plants.

== Cultivation ==
It was first collected in the Territory of Papua in 1884 and soon became popular as a greenhouse plant. After its discovery, fifteen other similar New Guinea taxa were collected, all of which were later determined to be forms of I. hawkeri.

Plants with a great variety of flower and leaf colours are sold in nurseries. The species has been crossed with Impatiens aurantiaca and I. platypetala to improve characteristics such as drought resistance.

== Gallery ==
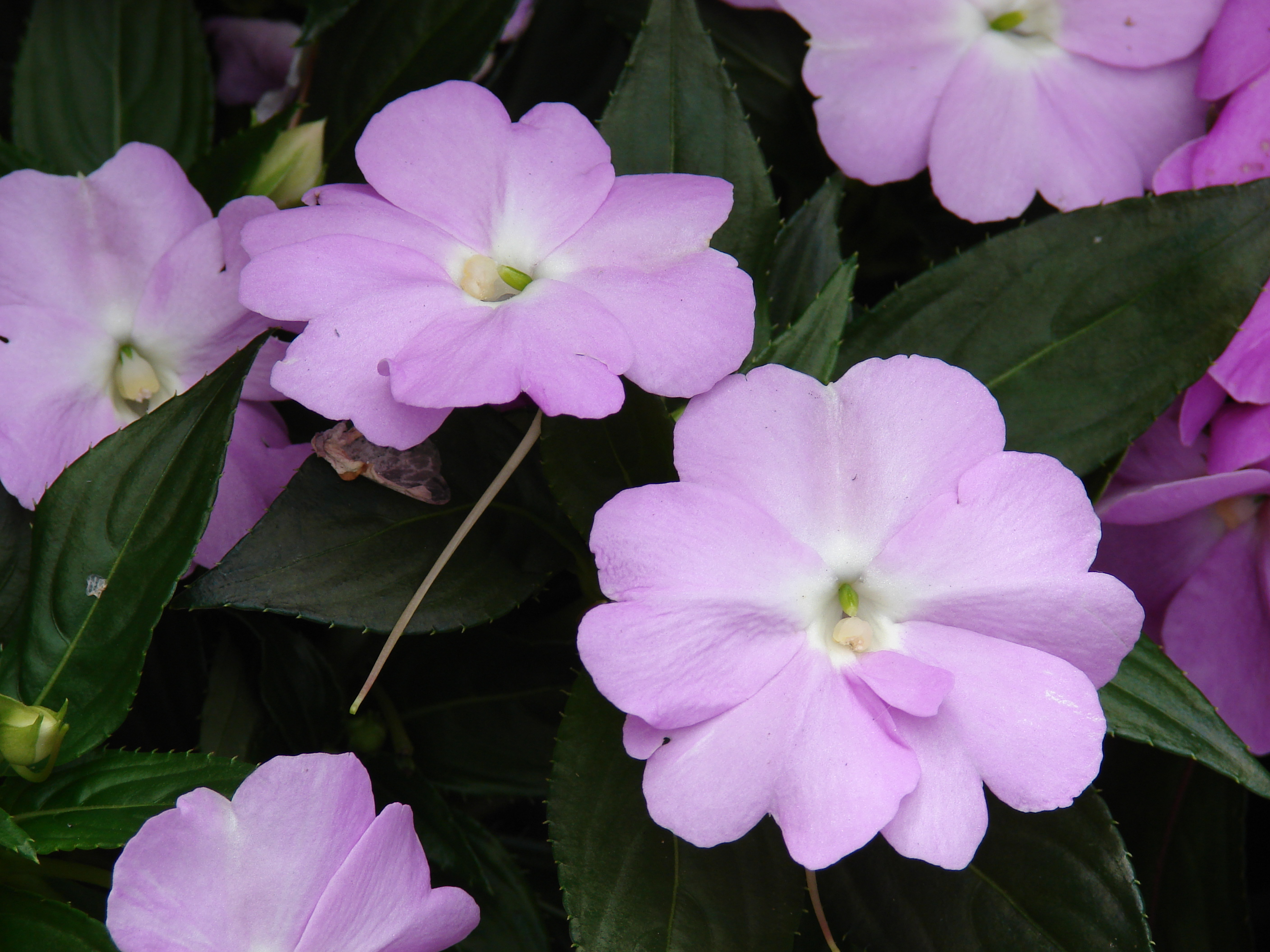
Cultivated specimen

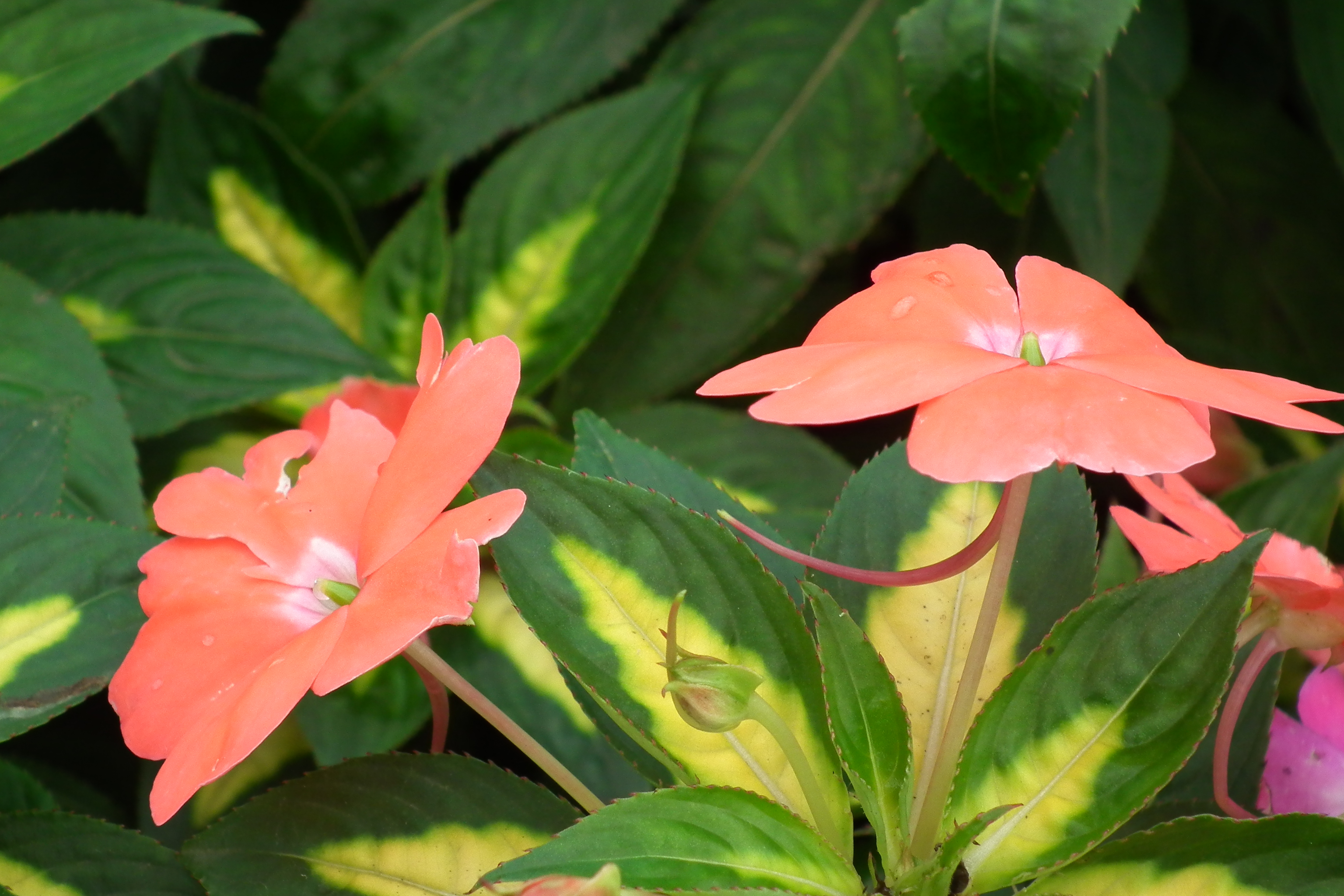
Orange flower
