= Poor-man's-orchid =

Poor-man's-orchid or poor man's orchid may refer to the following plants:

- Members of the genus Bauhinia
- Impatiens balfourii, a species of the genus Impatiens
- Members of the genus Schizanthus
