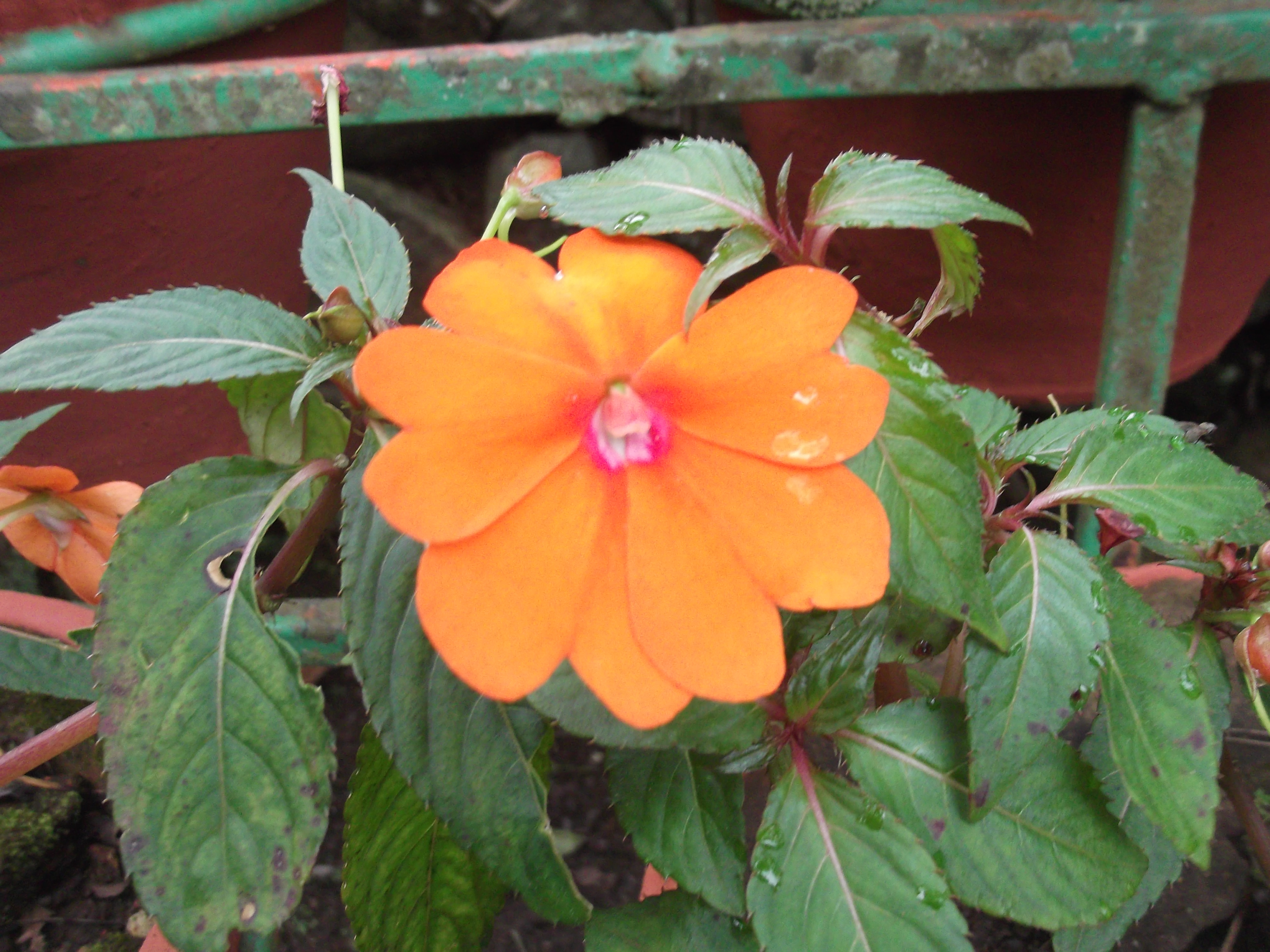

Scientific classification
- Kingdom: Plantae
- Clade: Tracheophytes
- Clade: Angiosperms
- Clade: Eudicots
- Clade: Asterids
- Order: Ericales
- Family: Balsaminaceae
- Genus: Impatiens
- Species: I. platypetala

Binomial name
- Impatiens platypetala Lindl.

Subspecies
- Impatiens platypetala Lindl. subsp. aurantiaca (Teijsm. ex Koord.) Steenis (Impatiens aurantiaca); Impatiens platypetala Lindl. subsp. platypetala

= Impatiens platypetala =

Species of flowering plant

Impatiens platypetala is variable species of perennial Impatiens discovered on the island of Java and widespread throughout Indonesia. It reaches 1 m (3.3 ft) high, with bright orange flowers that have a white eye in the center. The ovate to lanceolate-ovate leaves are 5 to 12 cm (2.0 to 4.7 in) long. It produces the anthocyanin aurantinidin.
