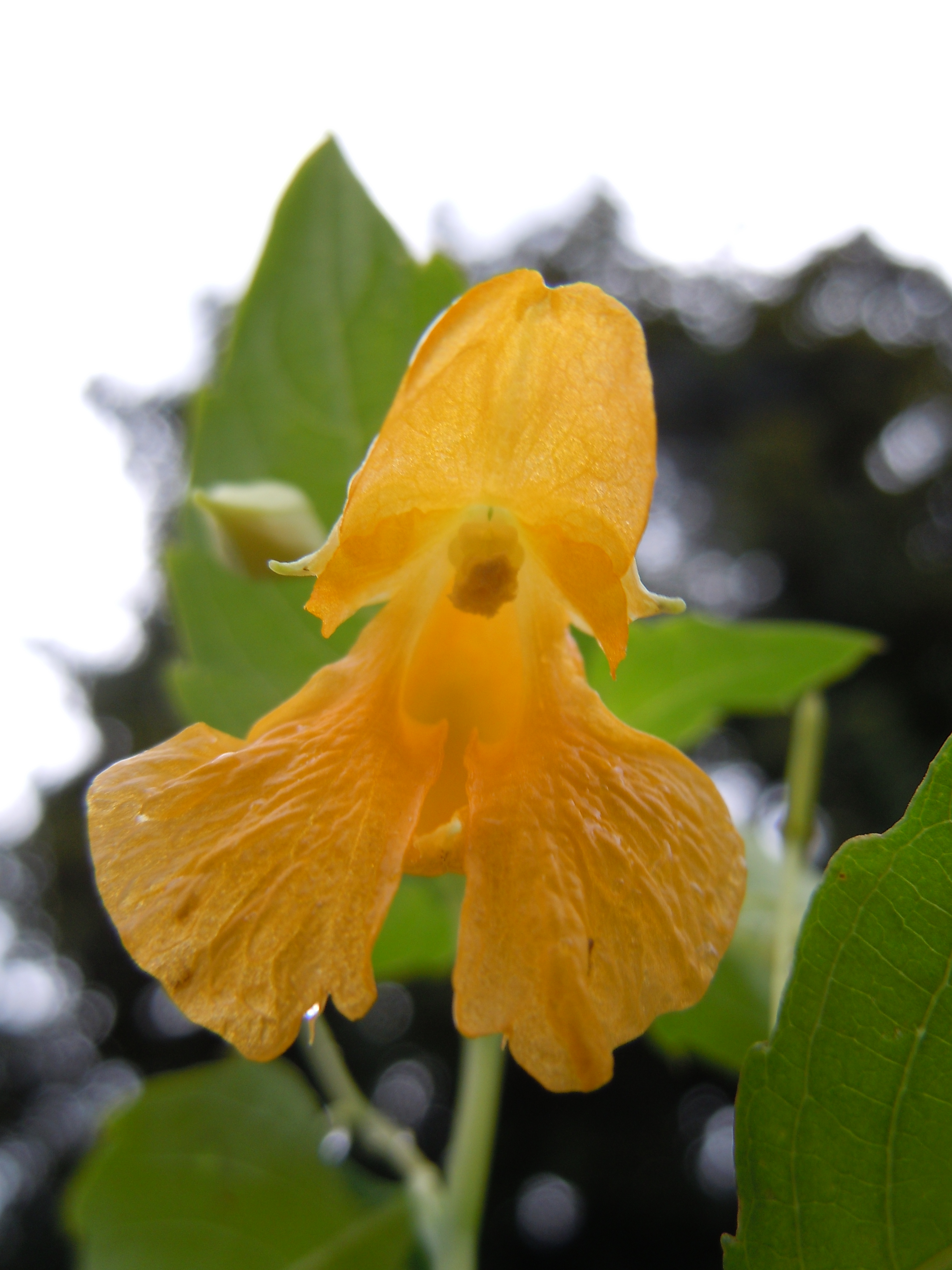

Conservation status
- Vulnerable (NatureServe)

Scientific classification
- Kingdom: Plantae
- Clade: Tracheophytes
- Clade: Angiosperms
- Clade: Eudicots
- Clade: Asterids
- Order: Ericales
- Family: Balsaminaceae
- Genus: Impatiens
- Species: I. ecornuta

Binomial name
- Impatiens ecornuta Moore, Zika & Rushworth

Synonyms
- Impatiens ecalcarata

= Impatiens ecornuta =

Species of flowering plant

Impatiens ecornuta, the spurless touch-me-not or western touch-me-not, is an annual flowering plant native to the northwestern United States and British Columbia in Canada.

The name of the species was changed in 2012 as Impatiens ecalcarata was found to be nomen illegitimum.

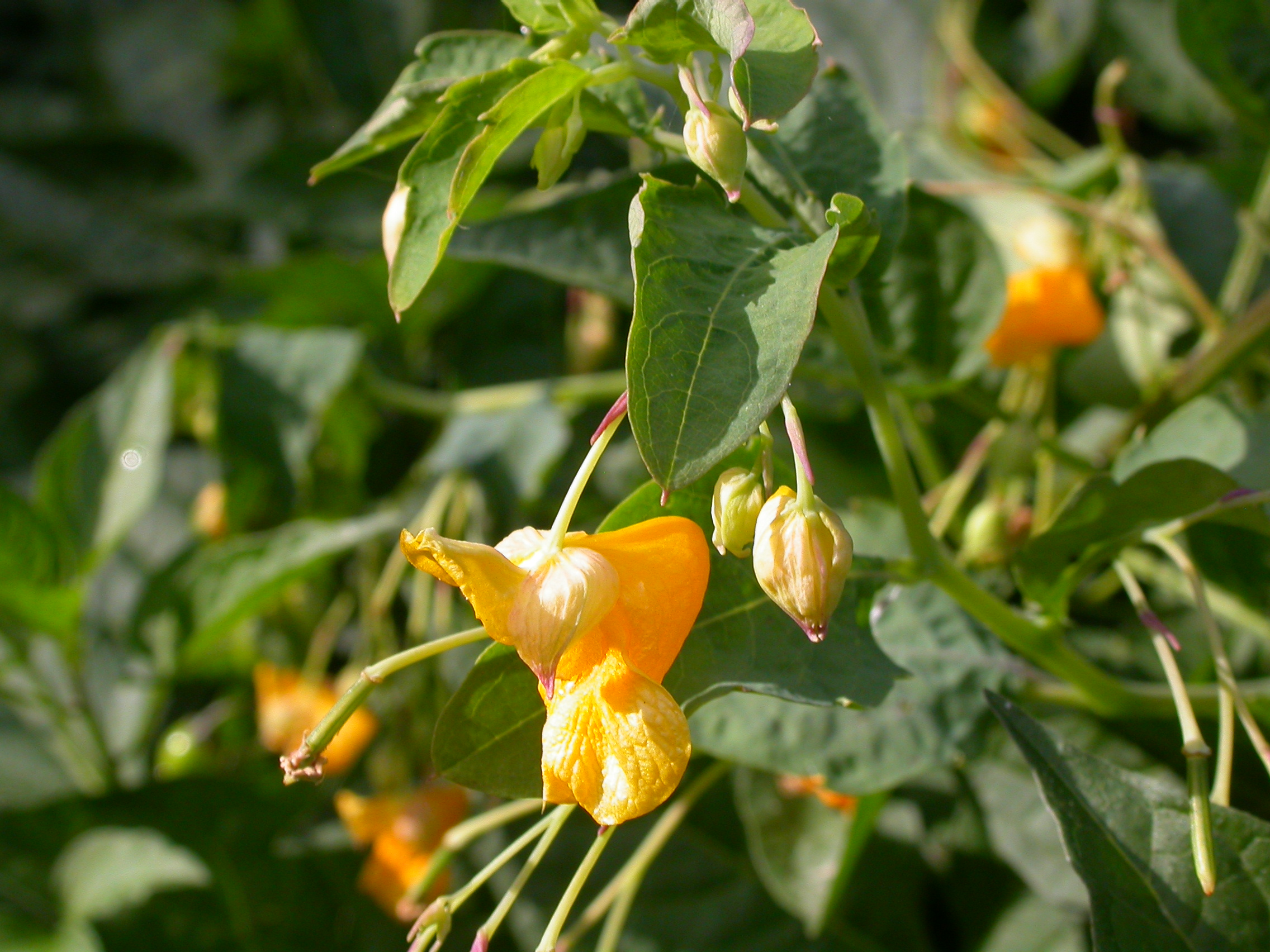
Spurless Jewelweed in Montana, USA
