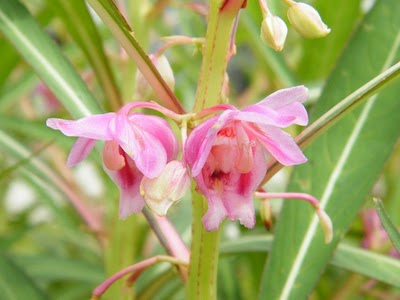
- Hydrocera triflora

Conservation status
- Least Concern (IUCN 3.1)

Scientific classification
- Kingdom: Plantae
- Clade: Tracheophytes
- Clade: Angiosperms
- Clade: Eudicots
- Clade: Asterids
- Order: Ericales
- Family: Balsaminaceae
- Genus: Hydrocera; Blume
- Species: H. triflora

Binomial name
- Hydrocera triflora Blume

= Hydrocera =

Genus of flowering plants

Hydrocera is a genus of flowering plants in the family Balsaminaceae (balsams). It contains a single species, Hydrocera triflora, from Southeast Asia. It is the only other genus in the family Balsaminaceae besides Impatiens.
