= Nicolaas Meerburgh =

Dutch botanist (1734–1814)

Nicolaas Meerburgh (1734 in Leiden – 20 March 1814 in Leiden) was a Netherlands gardener, botanist and botanical illustrator.

His date of birth is unknown, but he was baptized on February 3, 1734. He was possibly trained by the gardener Adriaan Steckhoven.

In 1752 he became a subservient in the Hortus Botanicus Leiden, where he remained for the rest of his life. He worked under three directors: Adriaan van Royen, David van Royen and Sebald Justinus Brugmans. In 1774, he became the curator there, and he remained there until his death in 1814. In 1775 he published the first volume of his "Portraits of Rare Plants" (Dutch: Afbeeldingen van zeldzame gewassen), which was followed by four other volumes, of which in 1780 the latter was published. The volumes contain 50 engravings, which he made of plants from the Hortus botanicus Leiden and butterflies. In 1789 he published Plantae rariores vivis coloribus depictae, a full Latin version of his earlier work with 55 color plates and four extra pages of text and also published Plantarum selectarum icones pictae with 28 color images.

The standard abbreviation Meerb. is used to denote botanical names that he has published. An example of a botanical name he published is Impatiens capensis Meerb. (1775).

The Missouri Botanical Garden owns original copies of Pictures of Rare Crops and Plantarum selectarum icones pictae and has put them Digitized and put them on the Internet.

Macrolepidoptera

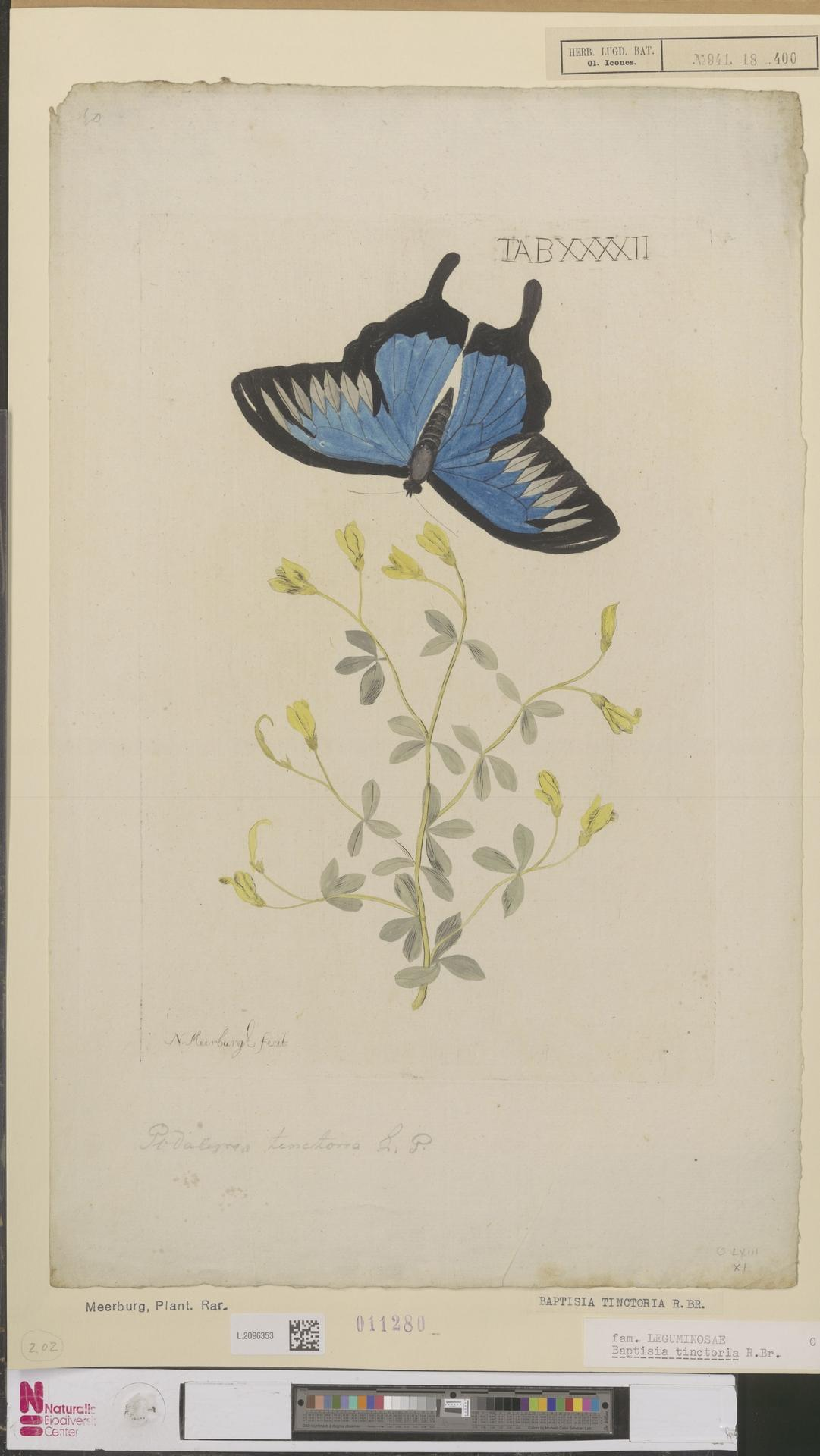
Baptisia tinctoria Robert Brown with butterfly

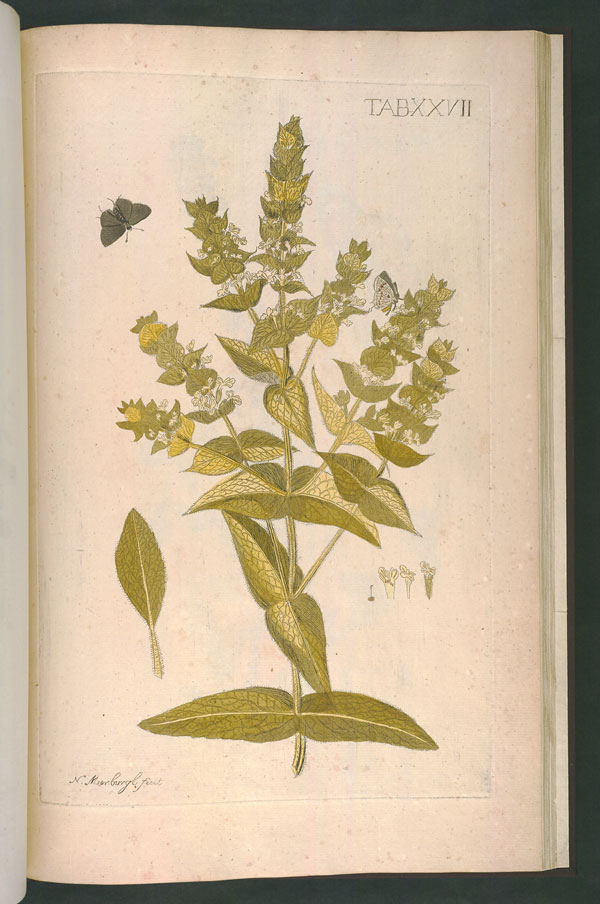
Sideritis perfoliata with Papilio echion

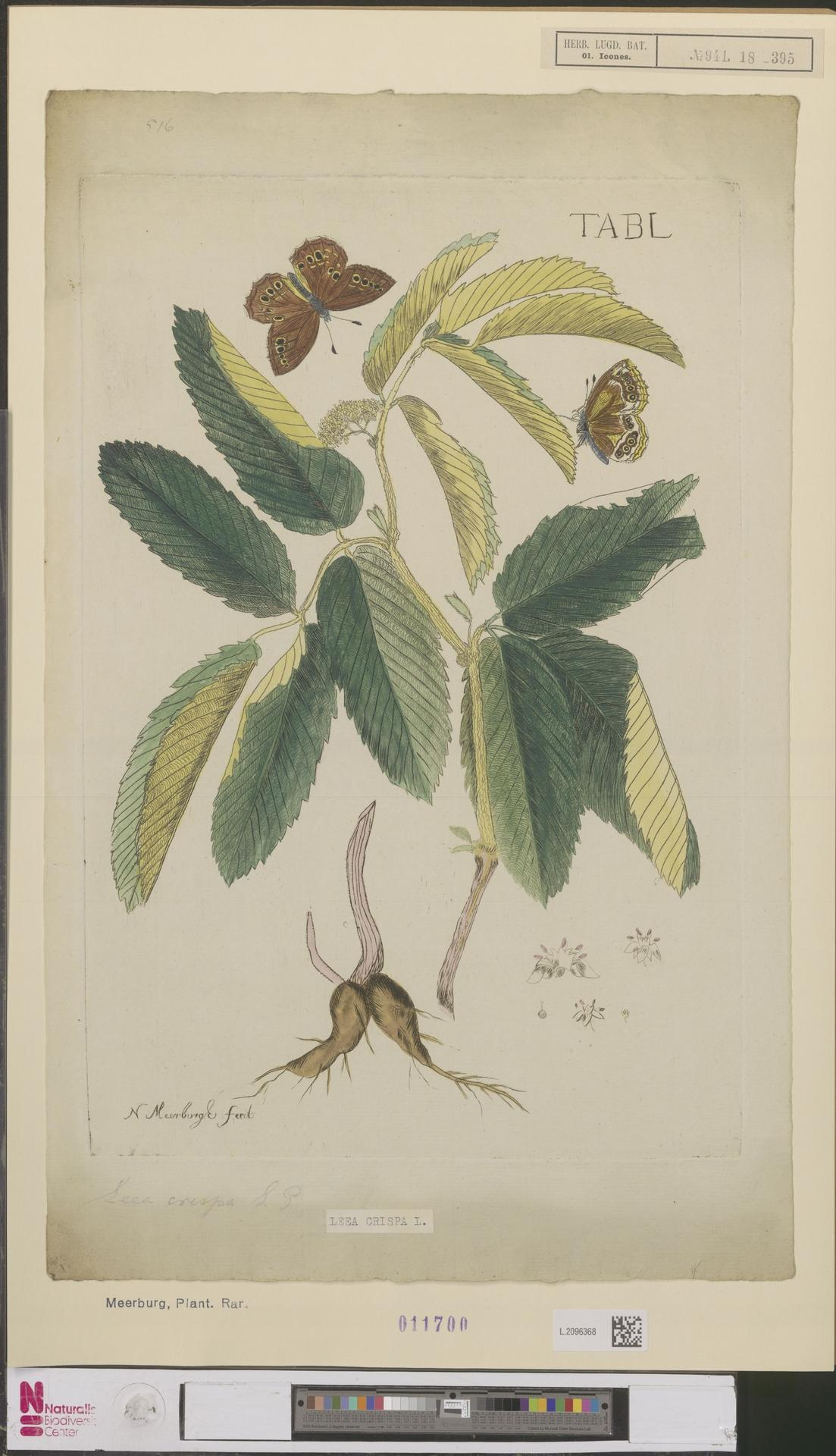
Leea crispa Linnaeus

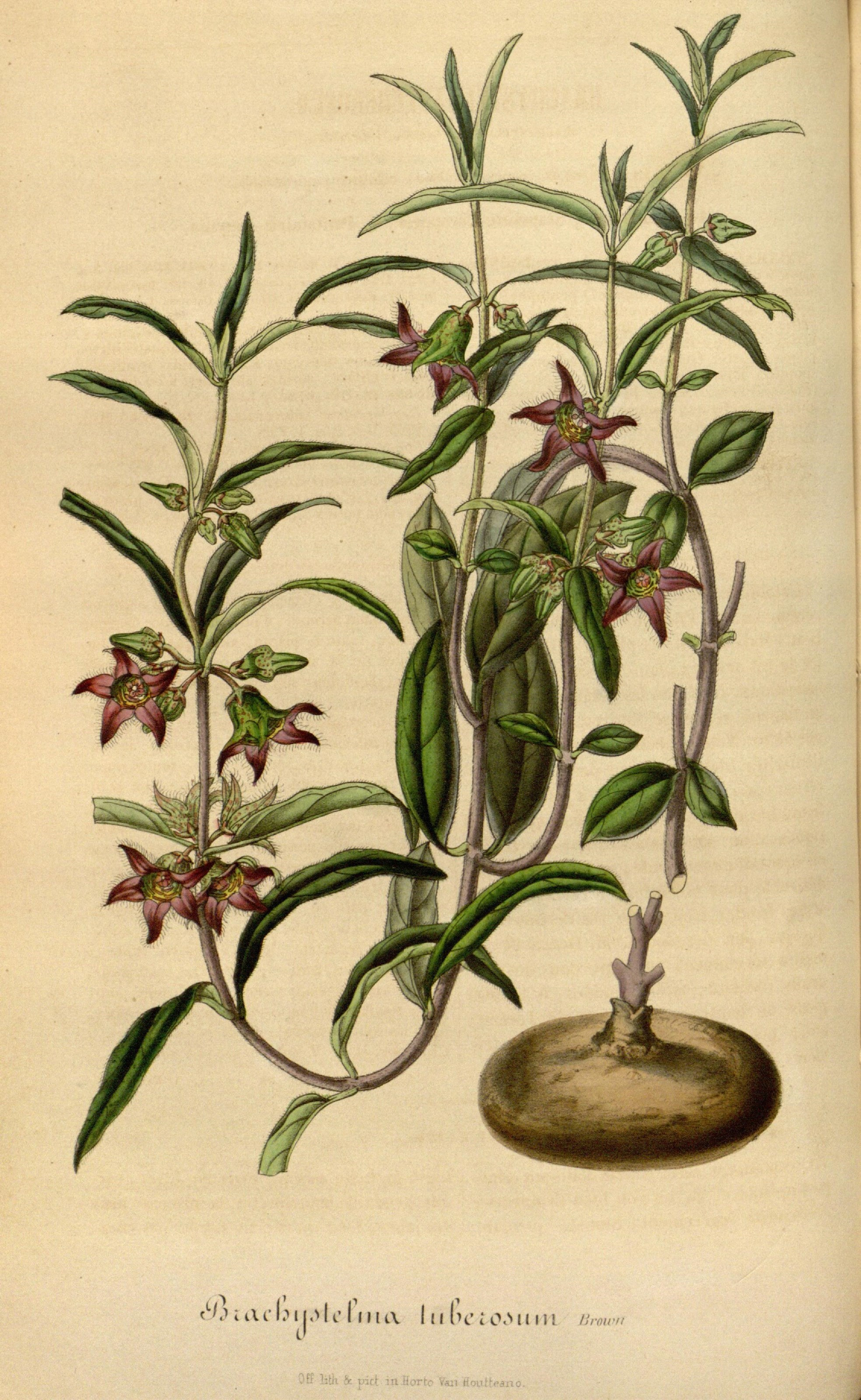
Flore des serres et des jardins de l'Europe

== Bibliography ==
- The Leiden Hortus, a botanical heritage, W.K.H. Karstens & H. Kleibrink, Waanders, 1982, ISBN 9070072920
- Hortus Academicus Lugduno-Batavus, 1587-1937, H. Veendorp & L.G.M. Baas Becking, first edition in 1938, reissue in 1990 with an added introduction by C. Kalkman, ISBN 90-71236-05-6
