= Impatiens nagorum =

Scientific classification
- Kingdom: Plantae
- Clade: Tracheophytes
- Clade: Angiosperms
- Clade: Eudicots
- Clade: Asterids
- Order: Ericales
- Family: Balsaminaceae
- Genus: Impatiens
- Species: I. nagorum

Binomial name
- Impatiens nagorum Gogoi, Moaakum & S.Dey

Species of flowering plant

Impatiens nagorum is a species of flowering plant in the family Balsaminaceae. It is native to parts of northeastern India, in the Naga Hills region.

== Description ==
The species grows in moist forest habitats and shaded mountainous areas. Like other members of the genus Impatiens, it produces delicate flowers and succulent stems. The plant is typically found in humid environments with rich soil and high rainfall. It is one of many endemic or regionally distributed species within the diverse genus Impatiens.
