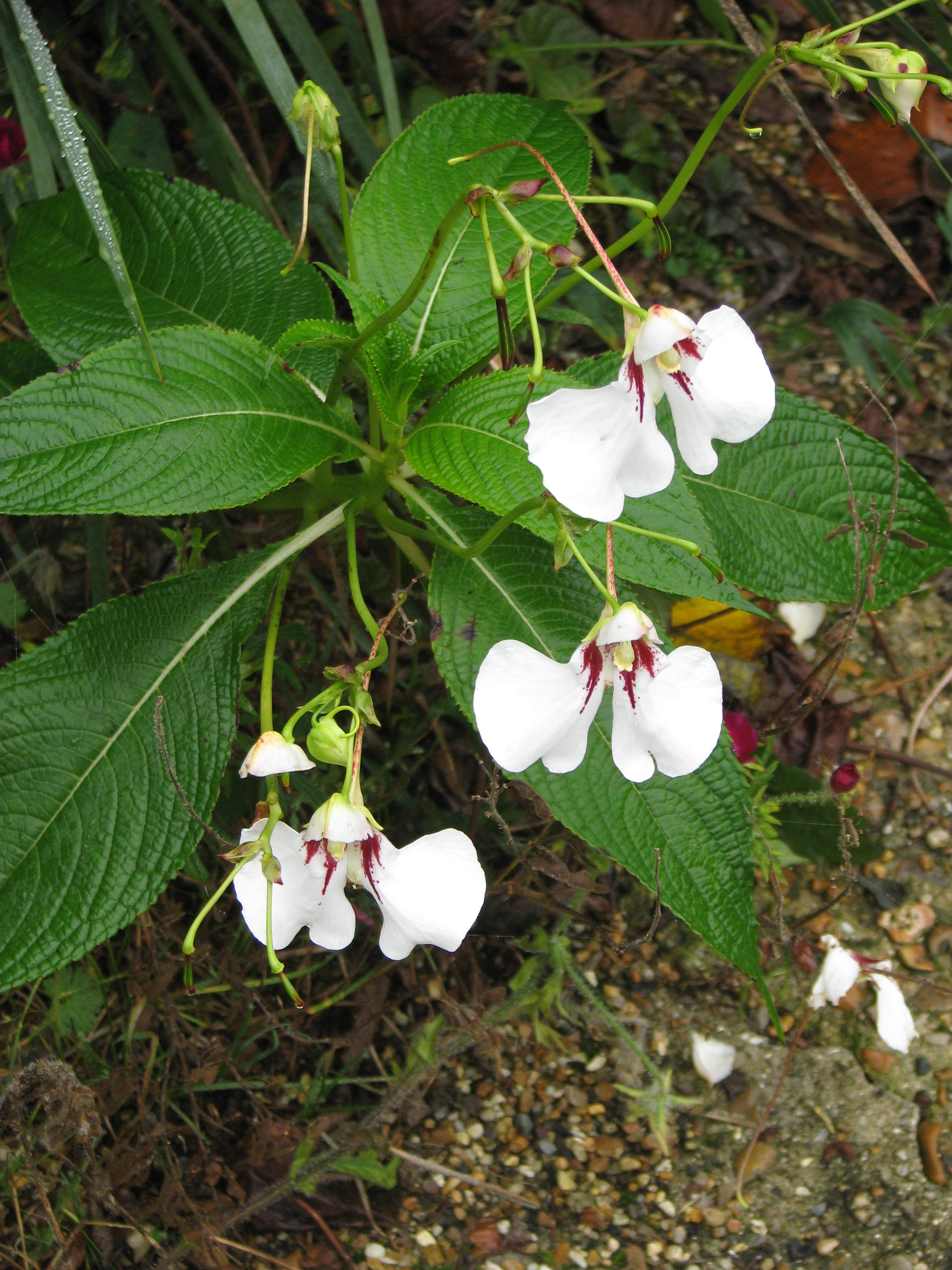

Scientific classification
- Kingdom: Plantae
- Clade: Embryophytes
- Clade: Tracheophytes
- Clade: Angiosperms
- Clade: Eudicots
- Clade: Asterids
- Order: Ericales
- Family: Balsaminaceae
- Genus: Impatiens
- Species: I. tinctoria

Binomial name
- Impatiens tinctoria A.Rich.

= Impatiens tinctoria =

Species of flowering plant

Impatiens tinctoria, the dyers busy lizzie, is a species of flowering plant in the balsam family Balsaminaceae, native to tropical Africa.

== Description ==
This erect perennial grows from large underground tubers, to a height of 2 m (6.6 ft) or more. It has deeply-veined, elliptic, slightly toothed leaves. Large 6 cm (2.4 in) hooded white flowers, with deep crimson splashes in the centres, hang from short stems in summer and autumn. Each flower bears a curved red spur at the back, up to 5 in (13 cm) long. The flowers are scented like gardenias. The stems and leaves are succulent and fleshy.

Impatiens tinctoria is listed by the Plant List as "Unresolved", meaning that it has not yet been established as an accepted name or a synonym.

== Cultivation ==
This tropical plant tolerates short periods down to −5 °C (23 °F) (RHS H3), as long as it is kept in a sheltered, partially shaded spot with a protective mulch in winter. It prefers humid conditions which replicate its native habitat.

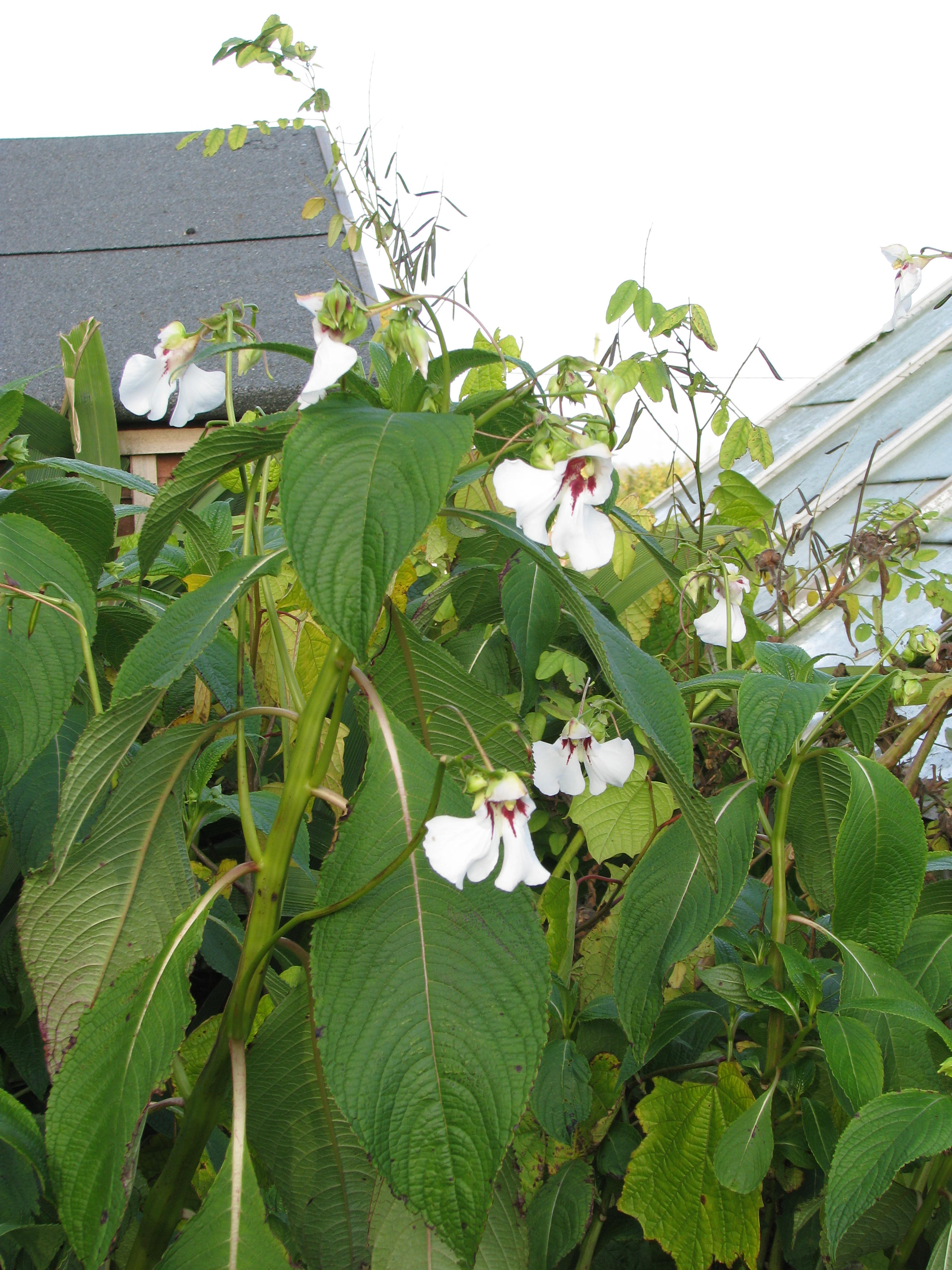

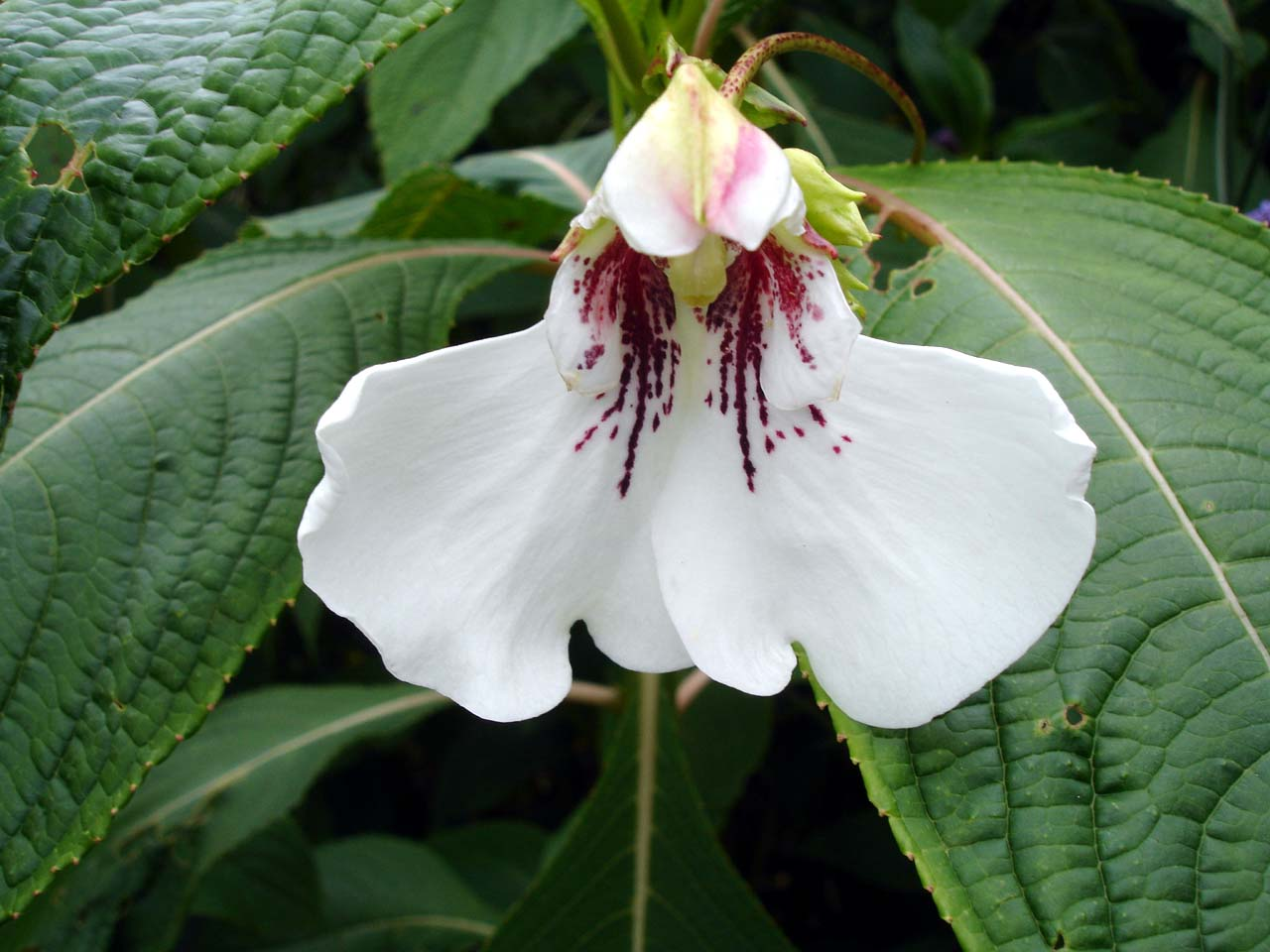

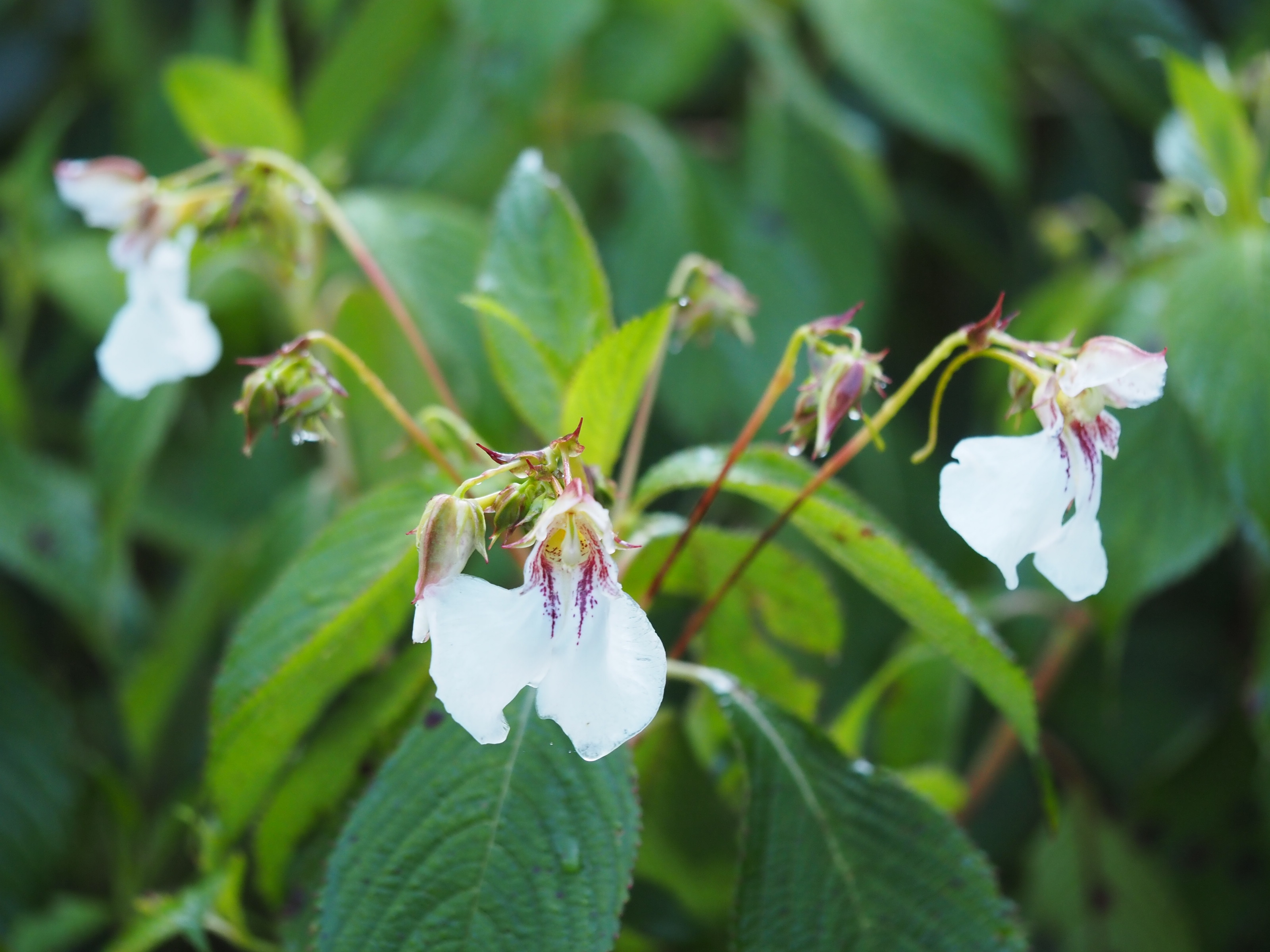
