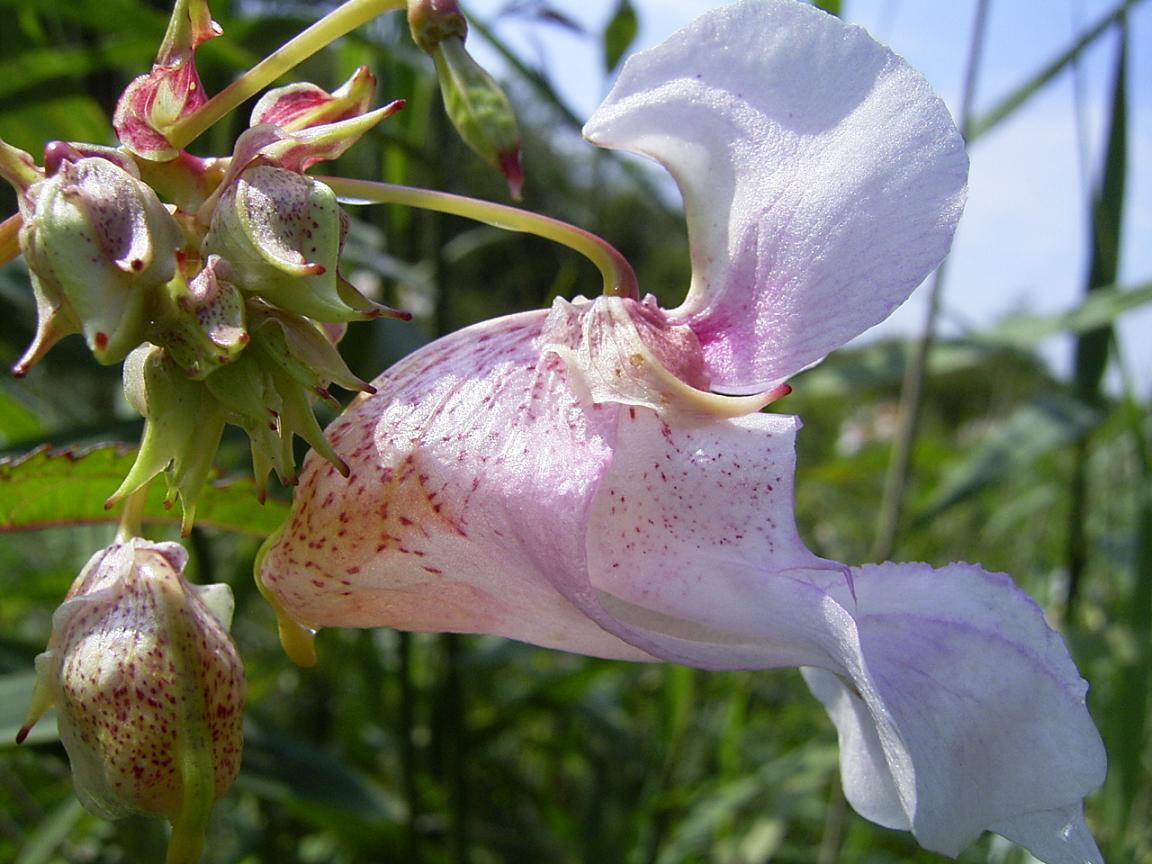
- Impatiens glandulifera

Scientific classification
- Kingdom: Plantae
- Clade: Tracheophytes
- Clade: Angiosperms
- Clade: Eudicots
- Clade: Asterids
- Order: Ericales
- Family: Balsaminaceae; A.Rich.

Genera
- Hydrocera; Impatiens

= Balsaminaceae =

Family of flowering plants

The Balsaminaceae (commonly known as the balsam family) are a family of dicotyledonous plants, comprising two genera: Impatiens, which consists of over 1000 species, and Hydrocera, consisting of 1 species. The flowering plants may be annual or perennial. They are found throughout temperate and tropical regions, primarily in Asia and Africa, but also North America and Europe.

Notable members of the family include jewelweed and busy Lizzie.

== Genera ==
- Impatiens
- Hydrocera
